= Sara Bareilles discography =

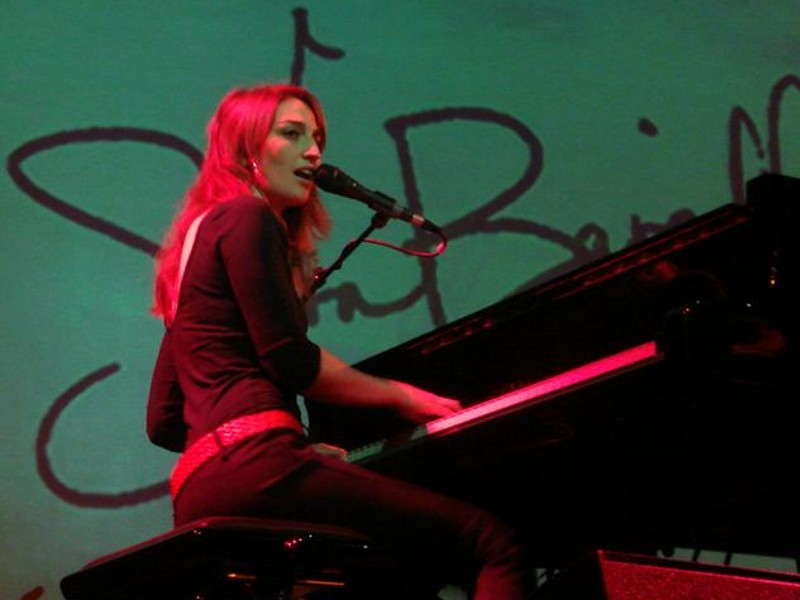
- Bareilles performing at Amsterdam in 2008
- Studio albums: 7
- Extended plays: 5
- Soundtrack albums: 2
- Live albums: 3
- Singles: 25
- Music videos: 14
- Other appearances: 10

American singer-songwriter Sara Bareilles has released seven studio albums, two demo albums, four live albums, two soundtrack albums, six extended plays, twenty-one singles and thirteen music videos. After graduating from University of California, Los Angeles, Bareilles independently released her debut album Careful Confessions in January 2004. In 2005, music executive Charlie Walk signed her to a record deal with Epic Records. A year after, she began to work with Eric Rosse on her second studio album, Little Voice, which featured six re-recorded songs of the twelve that were originally on Careful Confessions, plus six additional songs. Little Voice was released in July 2007 and entered the Billboard 200 chart in the United States at number 45, which marked as her chart debut. The album became a commercial success, it peaked on the chart at number 7 and was certified platinum by the Recording Industry Association of America (RIAA) for shipments of one million copies in the United States, subsequently becoming her most successful studio album to date. Its lead single, "Love Song", became a worldwide hit, charting at the top-ten in many regions. Epic released two additional singles, "Bottle It Up" and "Gravity", from Little Voice.

After experiencing a writer's block, she began to work for her third studio album with Neal Avron in 2009. The album, Kaleidoscope Heart, was released in September 2010 and debuted at the top of the Billboard 200 chart. Its lead single, "King of Anything", became a top-forty hit on the Billboard Hot 100, and was succeeded by "Uncharted" and "Gonna Get Over You" as the album's subsequent single releases. In 2013, Bareilles began to work for her fourth studio album, The Blessed Unrest, after moving to New York City. The album was released in July 2013 and entered the Billboard 200 chart at number 2. Two singles, "Brave" and "I Choose You", were released from The Blessed Unrest, with "Brave" surpassing "Love Song" as her longest-staying song on the Billboard Hot 100. According to Epic Records, Bareilles has sold over 2.05 million albums and 9 million singles in the United States.

== Albums ==
=== Studio albums ===
List of albums, with selected chart positions, sales, and certifications
Title	Album details	Peak chart positions										Certifications
Title	Album details	US	AUS	AUT	CAN	GER	IRL	NLD	NZ	SWI	UK	Certifications
Careful Confessions	Release date: January 20, 2004; Label: Tiny Bear; Format: CD	—	—	—	—	—	—	—	—	—	—	
Little Voice	Release date: July 3, 2007; Label: Epic; Format: CD, LP, digital download	7	49	46	—	52	36	31	26	34	9	RIAA: 2× Platinum; BPI: Silver; RMNZ: Gold
Kaleidoscope Heart	Release date: September 7, 2010; Label: Epic; Format: CD, LP, digital download	1	—	—	13	—	—	—	—	97	138	RIAA: Gold
The Blessed Unrest	Release date: July 16, 2013; Label: Epic; Format: CD, LP, digital download	2	73	—	7	—	—	—	—	55	—	RIAA: Gold; RMNZ: Gold
What's Inside: Songs from Waitress	Release date: November 6, 2015; Label: Epic; Format: CD, LP, digital download	10	90	—	63	—	—	—	—	—	—	
Amidst the Chaos	Release date: April 5, 2019; Label: Epic; Format: CD, LP, digital download	6	25	—	35	—	—	—	—	—	82	
Good Grief	Released: August 28, 2026; Label: Epic; Format: CD, LP, digital download	35	75	—	—	—	—	—	—	—	—	
"—" denotes releases that did not chart.

=== Soundtrack and cast albums ===
List of soundtracks, with selected chart positions, sales, and certifications
Title	Album details	Peak chart positions	
Title	Album details	US Sales	US Cast
Waitress (Original Broadway Cast Recording)	Release date: July 1, 2016; Label: 90 Live, DMI Soundtracks; Format: CD, digital download	—	3
Jesus Christ Superstar Live in Concert (Original Soundtrack of the NBC Television Event)	Release date: April 6, 2018; Label: Sony Masterworks; Format: CD, digital download, LP	14	—
More Love: Songs from Little Voice Season One	Release date: September 5, 2020; Label: Epic; Format: CD, LP, digital download	32	—
Girls5eva: Music from the Peacock Original Series	Release date: May 6, 2021; Label: Epic; Format: CD, digital download	—	—
Girls5eva: Season 2 (Original Series Soundtrack)	Release date: June 13, 2022; Label: Epic; Format: CD, digital download	—	—
Into the Woods (2022 Broadway Cast Recording)	Release date: September 30, 2022; Label: Craft, Concord Theatricals; Format: CD, digital download, LP	42	1

=== Demo albums ===
List of albums, with relevant details
Title	Album details
The First One	Release date: April 2003; Format: CD
The Summer Sessions	Release date: October 2003; Format: CD

=== Live albums ===
List of albums, with selected chart positions
Title	Album details	Peak chart positions
Title	Album details	US
Between the Lines: Sara Bareilles Live at the Fillmore	Release date: October 28, 2008; Label: Epic; Format: CD+DVD, CD+BD	—
iTunes Live from SoHo	Release date: February 8, 2011; Label: Epic; Format: Digital download	107
Brave Enough: Live at the Variety Playhouse	Release date: October 22, 2013; Label: Epic; Format: CD+DVD	66
Amidst the Chaos: Live from the Hollywood Bowl	Release date: May 21, 2021; Label: Epic; Format: CD, LP, digital download	— (Note: Amidst the Chaos: Live from the Hollywood Bowl did not enter the Billboard 200 but did peak at number 20 on the Top Album Sales chart.)
"—" denotes releases that did not chart.

== Extended plays ==
List of extended plays, with selected chart positions
Title	EP details	Peak chart positions	
Title	EP details	US	CAN
Live Session	Release date: November 27, 2007; Label: Epic; Format: Digital download	— (Note: Live Session did not enter the main Billboard 200 chart, but peaked at number 15 on the Billboard Digital Albums chart.)	—
Unplugged on VH1	Release date: January 29, 2008; Label: Epic; Format: Digital download	—	—
Live from the Gravity Tour	Release date: November 27, 2009; Label: Epic; Format: Digital download	—	—
Kaleidoscope EP	Release date: September 7, 2010; Label: Epic; Format: Digital download	—	—
Once Upon Another Time	Release date: May 22, 2012; Label: Epic; Format: CD, digital download	8	33
What's Not Inside: The Lost Songs from Waitress (Outtakes and Demos Recorded for the Broadway Musical)	Release date: August 16, 2019; Label: 90 Live; Format: Digital download	—	—
"—" denotes releases that did not chart.

== Singles ==
List of singles, with selected chart positions and certifications, showing year released and album name
Title	Year	Peak chart positions										Certifications	Album
Title	Year	US	AUS	AUT	CAN	GER	IRL	NLD	NZ	SWI	UK	Certifications	Album
"Love Song"	2007	4	4	18	1	13	5	5	7	16	4	RIAA: 6× Platinum; ARIA: Platinum; BPI: Platinum; MC: Gold; RMNZ: 2× Platinum	Little Voice
"Bottle It Up"	2008	— (Note: "Bottle It Up" did not enter the Billboard Hot 100, but did peak at number seven on the Billboard Bubbling Under Hot 100 Singles chart.)	—	—	—	—	—	33	—	—	—	RIAA: Gold	Little Voice
"Gravity"	2009	— (Note: "Gravity" did not enter the Billboard Hot 100, but did peak at number 48 on the Billboard Pop Digital Songs chart.)	—	—	—	—	—	—	27	—	—	RIAA: 2× Platinum; BPI: Silver; RMNZ: Gold	Little Voice
"King of Anything"	2010	32	—	—	94	—	—	21	38	—	—	RIAA: Platinum	Kaleidoscope Heart
"Uncharted"	2011	— (Note: "Uncharted" did not enter the Billboard Hot 100, but did peak at number 16 on the Billboard Bubbling Under Hot 100 Singles chart.)	—	—	—	—	—	44	—	—	—		Kaleidoscope Heart
"Gonna Get Over You"	2011	—	—	—	—	—	—	—	—	—	—		Kaleidoscope Heart
"Love Is Christmas"	2011	—	—	—	—	—	—	83	—	—	—		Non-album single
"Stay"	2012	—	—	—	—	—	—	—	—	—	—		Once Upon Another Time
"Beautiful Girl"	2012	—	—	—	—	—	—	—	—	—	—		Non-album single
"Brave"	2013	23	3	—	58	—	30	—	4	67	48	RIAA: 3× Platinum; ARIA: 2× Platinum; BPI: Silver; RMNZ: 2× Platinum	The Blessed Unrest
"I Choose You"	2014	81	—	—	—	—	—	—	—	—	—	RIAA: Gold; RMNZ: Gold	The Blessed Unrest
"She Used to Be Mine"	2015	— (Note: She Used to Be Mine did not enter the Billboard Hot 100 chart, but peaked at number 49 on the Billboard Digital Song Sales chart.)	— (Note: "She Used to Be Mine" did not enter the ARIA Singles Chart, but peaked at number 40 on the ARIA Digital Track Chart.)	—	—	—	—	—	—	—	—	BPI: Silver; RMNZ: Gold	What's Inside: Songs from Waitress
"If I Dare"	2017	—	—	—	—	—	—	—	—	—	—		Battle of the Sexes (Original Motion Picture Soundtrack)
"Theodosia Reprise"	2018	—	—	—	—	—	—	—	—	—	—		Non-album single
"Armor"	2018	— (Note: "Armor" did not enter the Billboard Hot 100, but did peak at number 22 on the Billboard Pop Digital Song Sales chart.)	—	—	—	—	—	—	—	—	—		Amidst the Chaos
"Fire"	2019	—	—	—	—	—	—	—	—	—	—		Amidst the Chaos
"Shiny"	2019	—	—	—	—	—	—	—	—	—	—		Amidst the Chaos (bonus version)
"No Such Thing" (with Dave Audé) (Note: The solo version of the song appears on Amidst the Chaos.)	2020	—	—	—	—	—	—	—	—	—	—		Non-album single
"Free to Be... You and Me"	2020	—	—	—	—	—	—	—	—	—	—		Non-album single
"Little Voice"	2020	—	—	—	—	—	—	—	—	—	—		More Love: Songs from Little Voice Season One
"Orpheus / Fire"	2021	—	—	—	—	—	—	—	—	—	—		Amidst the Chaos: Live at the Hollywood Bowl
"Wonder" (with Morgxn)	2021	—	—	—	—	—	—	—	—	—	—		Non-album single
"Salt Then Sour Then Sweet" (featuring Brandi Carlile)	2025	—	—	—	—	—	—	—	—	—	—		Come See Me in the Good Light
"Home”	2026	—	—	—	—	—	—	—	—	—	—		Good Grief
"Still Crying"	2026	—	—	—	—	—	—	—	—	—	—		Good Grief
"—" denotes releases that did not chart.

=== Featured singles ===
List of featured singles, with selected chart positions, showing year released and album name
Title	Year	Peak chart positions					Album
Title	Year	US	US AC	CAN	CAN AC	IRL	Album
"Winter Song" (Ingrid Michaelson featuring Sara Bareilles)	2008	— (Note: "Winter Song" did not enter the Billboard Hot 100, but did peak at number 18 on the Billboard Bubbling Under Hot 100 Singles chart.)	—	97	—	2	The Hotel Café Presents Winter Songs
"Barcelona" (Jay Nash featuring Sara Bareilles)	2008	—	—	—	—	—	The Things You Think You Need
"Come Home" (OneRepublic featuring Sara Bareilles)	2009	80	—	—	—	—	Dreaming Out Loud
"Summer Is Over" (Jon McLaughlin featuring Sara Bareilles)	2012	—	—	—	—	—	Promising Promises
"Come Back Down" (Greg Laswell featuring Sara Bareilles)	2012	—	—	—	—	—	Landline
"I Want You Back" (Straight No Chaser featuring Sara Bareilles)	2013	—	—	—	—	—	Under the Influence
"Baby, It's Cold Outside" (Seth MacFarlane featuring Sara Bareilles)	2014	—	10	—	10	—	Holiday for Swing
"Christmas Tree" (Zac Brown Band featuring Sara Bareilles)	2016	—	—	—	—	—	Non-album single
"Miss America" (Ingrid Michaelson featuring Sara Bareilles)	2017	—	—	—	—	—	Alter Egos
"—" denotes releases that did not chart.

== Other appearances ==
List of non-single appearances, showing year released, with other performing artists, and album name
Title	Year	Artist	Album
"Teresa"	2006	Peter Bradley Adams	Gather Up
"Smile"	2007	Todd Carey	Watching Waiting
"Why Should She Wait"	2008	Marc Broussard	Keep Coming Back
"Barcelona"	2008	Jay Nash	The Things You Think You Need
"You In the End"	2009	Matt Hires	Take Us to the Start
"Remember Us" and "New Friend"	2010	Aqualung	Magnetic North
"(If You're Wondering If I Want You To) I Want You To"	2010	Weezer	Raditude... Happy Record Store Day!
"Back to Me"	2010	Tony Lucca	Rendezvous with the Angels
"Always Remember Me"	2010	Ry Cuming	Ry Cuming
"Broken Headlights"	2010	Joey Ryan	Kenter Canyon EP
"Love Won't Let You Get Away"	2011	Seth MacFarlane	Music Is Better Than Words
"If You Go"	2013	Javier Dunn	Trails
"I Can Let Go Now"	2014	Nathan East	Nathan East
"Disappearing"	2014	Dan Wilson	Love Without Fear
"What's Going On"	2014	Clarence Bekker (PFC Band) and Titi Tsira (PFC Band)	Playing for Change 3: Songs Around the World
"Mango Tree"	2014	Zac Brown Band	Jekyll + Hyde
"Wild Heart"	2015	Bleachers	Terrible Thrills, Vol. 2
"Christmas Tree"	2015	Zac Brown Band	—N/a
"This Is on Me"	2016	Ben Abraham	Sirens
"Miss America"	2017	Ingrid Michaelson	Alter Egos
"If I Dare"	2017	—N/a	Battle of the Sexes
"Tightrope"	2018	—N/a	The Greatest Showman: Reimagined

== Music videos ==
List of music videos, showing year released, and directors
Title	Year	Director
"Love Song"	2007	Josh Forbes
"Bottle It Up"	2008	Marcos Siega
"Winter Song" (Ingrid Michaelson and Sara Bareilles)	2008	Crush Creative
"Gravity"	2009	Mathew Cullen
"King of Anything"	2010	Laurent Brie
"Uncharted"	2011	Travis Schneider and Javier Dunn
"Gonna Get Over You"	2011	Jonah Hill
"Summer Is Over" (Jon McLaughlin featuring Sara Bareilles)	2012	Robby Starbuck
"Brave"	2013	Rashida Jones
"I Choose You"	2014	Dennis Liu
"She Used to Be Mine"	2015	
Armor	2019	Bryan Mir
Fire	2019	Nicholas Lam
