= Kaleidoscope Heart Tour =

2010–11 concert tour by Sara Bareilles

- Tour by Sara Bareilles
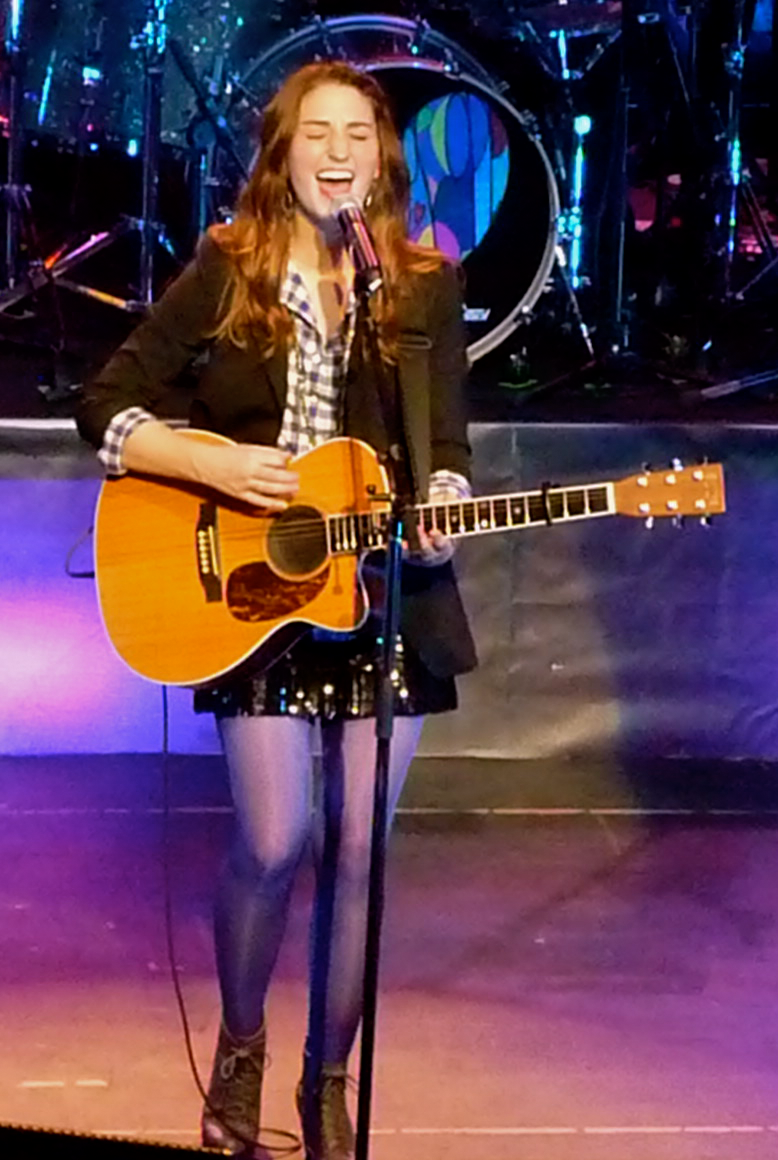
- Bareilles during the tour at the Warfield on December 16, 2010
- Associated album: Kaleidoscope Heart
- Start date: September 25, 2010
- End date: December 10, 2011
- Legs: 3
- No. of shows: 62 in North America; 5 in Asia; 67 total

Sara Bareilles concert chronology
- Gravity Tour (2009); Kaleidoscope Heart Tour (2010–11); Brave Enough Tour (2013)

Kaleidoscope Heart Tour was a concert tour by American singer-songwriter Sara Bareilles, in support of her second studio album, Kaleidoscope Heart.

There were three legs of the tour: the first was from September to December 2010, the second was in April and May 2011, and the third was from July to December 2011. Though the tour was predominantly in the United States, Bareilles also performed in Canada, Singapore, South Korea, Japan, and Indonesia.

== Support acts ==
Leg 1

- Greg Laswell (9/25 – 10/18)
- Javier Dunn (9/25 – 10/4)
- Cary Brothers (11/2 – 11/24)
- Holly Conlan (10/7 – 11/24)
- Augustana (11/13)
- Raining Jane (12/16)
- Joey Ryan (12/17 – 12/18)
- Kenneth Pattengale (12/17 – 12/18)

Leg 2

- Elizabeth & the Catapult
- Ximena Sariñana
- Javier Dunn

Leg 3

- Joshua Radin (7/19)
- Raining Jane (7/19)
- Javier Dunn
- Ben Lee (10/11 – 10/17)
- Elizabeth & the Catapult(10/10 – 10/17)
- Joshua Radin

== Setlist ==
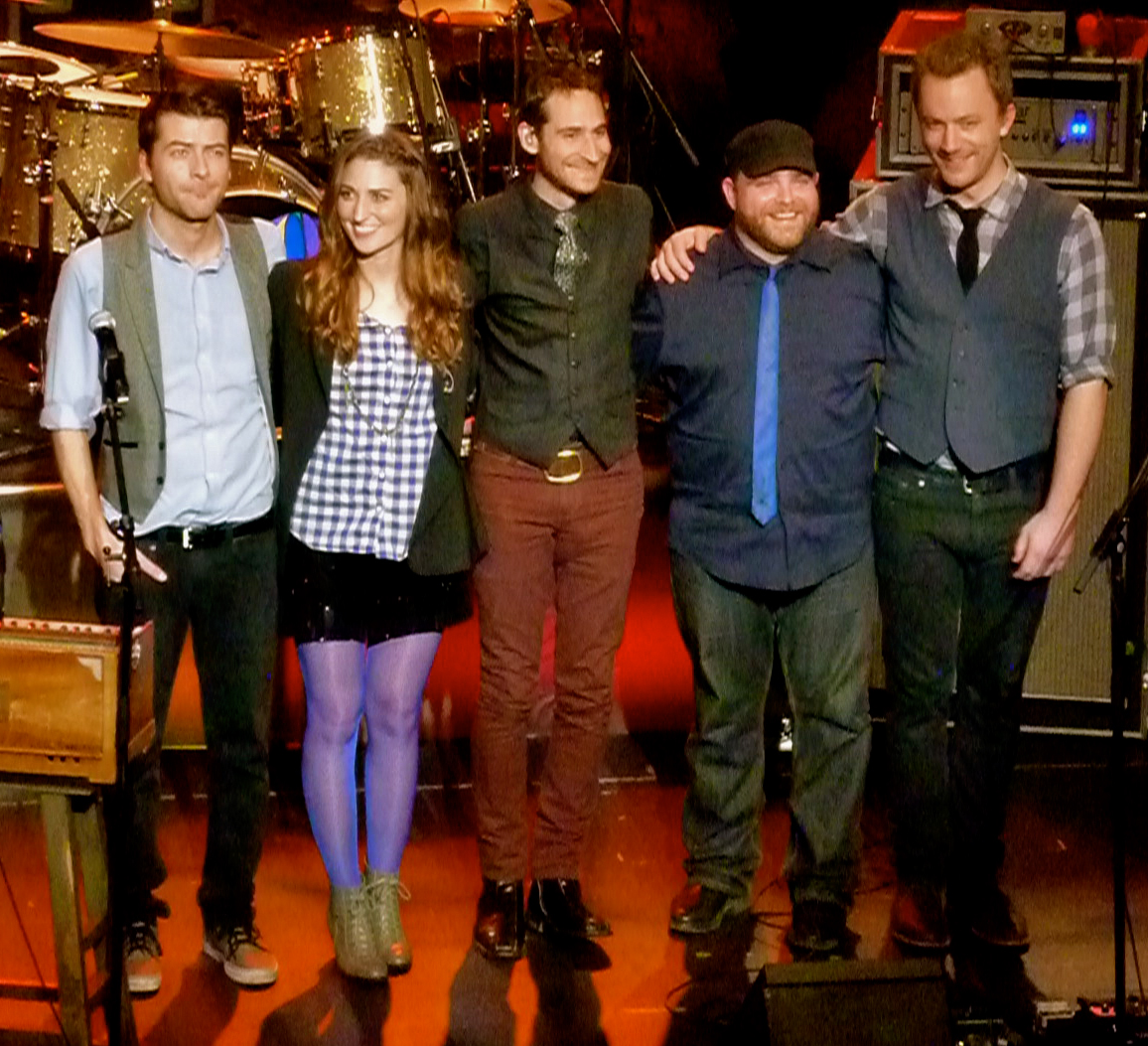
Bareilles and band the tour at the Warfield on December 16, 2010.

Setlist (Round 1)
1. Vegas
2. Uncharted
3. Gonna Get Over You
4. Love Song
5. Hold My Heart
6. Basket Case
7. Nice Dream (Radiohead cover)
8. Let the Rain
9. Bottle it up
10. King of Anything
11. Fairytale
12. Gravity
13. Kaleidoscope Heart
14. Many the Miles

=== Additional notes ===
- Since the show on October 18, Bareilles performed "Machine Gun" after "Gonna Get Over You".
- At certain concerts, Bareilles performed Cee Lo Green's "Fuck You" before "Gonna Get Over You".
- At certain concerts, Bareilles performed Beyoncé's "Single Ladies (Put a Ring on It)" before "Gonna Get Over You".

== Tour dates ==
Date	City	Country	Venue
Leg 1
September 25, 2010	Portland	United States	Roseland Theater
September 28, 2010	Los Angeles	United States	Orpheum Theatre
September 29, 2010	San Diego	United States	House of Blues
September 30, 2010	Tempe	United States	Marquee Theatre
October 2, 2010	Dallas	United States	Palladium Ballroom
October 3, 2010	Austin	United States	La Zona Rosa
October 4, 2010	Houston	United States	House of Blues
October 7, 2010	Atlanta	United States	Variety Playhouse
October 8, 2010	Nashville	United States	Ryman Auditorium
October 11, 2010	Fort Lauderdale	United States	Revolution
October 12, 2010	Orlando	United States	House of Blues
October 14, 2010	Charlotte	United States	The Neighborhood Theatre
October 15, 2010	Carrboro	United States	Cat's Cradle
October 16, 2010	Philadelphia	United States	Trocadero Theatre
October 18, 2010	Washington, D.C.	United States	9:30 Club
November 2, 2010	Minneapolis	United States	Pantages Theatre
November 3, 2010	Chicago	United States	House of Blues
November 5, 2010	Milwaukee	United States	Pabst Theater
November 6, 2010	Louisville	United States	Brown Theatre
November 8, 2010	Toronto	Canada	Phoenix Concert Theatre
November 9, 2010	Boston	United States	House of Blues
November 10, 2010	New York City	United States	Webster Hall
November 13, 2010	St. Louis	United States	Touhill Performing Arts Center
November 14, 2010	Lawrence	United States	Liberty Hall
November 15, 2010	Denver	United States	Ogden Theatre
November 17, 2010	Salt Lake City	United States	In the Venue
November 19, 2010	Boise	United States	Knitting Factory Concert House
November 20, 2010	Spokane	United States	Knitting Factory Concert House
November 22, 2010	Vancouver	Canada	Commodore Ballroom
November 24, 2010	Reno	United States	Knitting Factory Concert House
December 16, 2010	San Francisco	United States	Warfield Theatre
December 17, 2010	Arcata	United States	Van Duzer Theatre
December 18, 2010	Arcata	United States	Van Duzer Theatre
Leg 2
April 1, 2011	Portland	United States	State Theatre
April 2, 2011	Providence	United States	Lupo's
April 3, 2011	Baltimore	United States	Rams Head Live!
April 6, 2011	Interlochen	United States	Corson Auditorium
April 9, 2011	Duluth	United States	The College of St. Scholastica
April 11, 2011	Pittsburgh	United States	Carnegie Music Hall
April 12, 2011	Winston-Salem	United States	Wake Forest University
April 13, 2011	Columbus	United States	Newport Music Hall
April 16, 2011	Covington	United States	Madison Theatre
April 17, 2011	Buffalo	United States	Canisius College
April 19, 2011	Asheville	United States	Orange Peel
April 21, 2011	Biloxi	United States	Hard Rock Casino
April 22, 2011	Birmingham	United States	Workplay Soundstage
April 23, 2011	Memphis	United States	Minglewood Hall
May 11, 2011	Singapore		Esplanade Concert Hall
May 12, 2011	Jakarta	Indonesia	Tennis Indoor Senayan
May 14, 2011	Seoul	South Korea	V-Hall
May 16, 2011	Osaka	Japan	Music Club Janus
May 17, 2011	Tokyo	Japan	Mt. Rainier Hall Shibuya Pleasure Pleasure
Leg 3
July 12, 2011	Apple Valley	United States	Subway Music in the Zoo Concert
July 13, 2011	Fargo	United States	Fargo Theatre
July 15, 2011	Missoula	United States	Wilma Theatre
July 19, 2011	Portland	United States	Arlene Schnitzer Concert Hall
July 20, 2011	Jacksonville	United States	Britt Festival
August 9, 2011	Cleveland	United States	House of Blues
August 11, 2011	Grand Rapids Charter Township	United States	Frederik Meijer Gardens
August 16, 2011	Tulsa	United States	Cain's Ballroom
August 30, 2011	Boston	United States	Bank of America Pavilion
August 31, 2011	New York City	United States	Rumsey Playfield
September 16, 2011	Austin	United States	Austin City Limits Music Festival
September 17, 2011	Boston	United States	MixFest
October 10, 2011	Urbana	United States	The Canopy Club
October 11, 2011	Chicago	United States	Riviera Theatre
October 17, 2011	Philadelphia	United States	Electric Factory
October 19, 2011	Newport News	United States	The Concert Hall
December 9, 2011	Los Angeles	United States	Hollywood Palladium
December 10, 2011	San Francisco	United States	Bill Graham Civic Auditorium

Cancellations and rescheduled shows

November 6, 2010	Louisville	Bomhard Theater	This performance was moved to the Brown Theatre.
November 17, 2010	Salt Lake City	Avalon Theater	This performance was moved to the in the Venue.
