= What's Inside: Songs from Waitress =

Studio album by Sara Bareilles
- Released: November 6, 2015
- Recorded: 2015
- Studio: Electric Lady Studios (New York City, NY)
- Genre: Pop
- Length: 36:45
- Label: Epic
- Producer: Neal Avron; Sara Bareilles

Sara Bareilles chronology
Brave Enough: Live at the Variety Playhouse (2013)	What's Inside: Songs from Waitress (2015)	Amidst the Chaos (2019)

Singles from What's Inside: Songs from Waitress
- 1. "She Used to Be Mine" Released: September 25, 2015

What's Inside: Songs from Waitress is the fifth studio album by American singer-songwriter Sara Bareilles, released on November 6, 2015, through Epic Records. The lead single from the album, "She Used to Be Mine", was released digitally on September 25, 2015. It features songs from the musical Waitress, for which Bareilles wrote the music and lyrics.

== Background ==
In June 2013, it was reported that Bareilles was to score Waitress, a musical adaptation of the 2007 film of the same name. The musical opened on August 20, 2015, at the American Repertory Theater in Cambridge, Massachusetts. The production was directed by Diane Paulus and starred Jessie Mueller in the leading role. Bareilles debuted one song from the musical called "She Used to be Mine" during some shows on her Little Black Dress Tour. The show closed on September 27, 2015, and after the successful run at A.R.T., it moved to the Brooks Atkinson Theatre on Broadway in April 2016. Previews began in March 2016 with Mueller retaining the lead. Bareilles took over the lead from Mueller for a 10-week limited run, which began on March 31, 2017, and returned from January 16 to March 11, 2018, with an overlap with Jason Mraz.

While writing the musical, Bareilles "fell more deeply in love with the writing of the musical Waitress than I had ever imagined." Her decision to record an album of the songs came because it "proved impossible for me to imagine handing over the songs to the show before selfishly finding a way to sing them myself." She confirmed during a Google Hangout Q & A session in June 2015 that the musical's songs would be reworked "to sound like Sara Bareilles songs."

== Recording ==
Bareilles began work on the album in April 2015 at New York City's Electric Lady Studios with producer Neal Avron, who previously worked with Bareilles on Kaleidoscope Heart.

== Promotion ==
On June 27, 2015, Bareilles and Nadia DiGiallonardo performed "She Used to Be Mine" with Rich Dworsky and The Berkshire Boys on A Prairie Home Companion. The album's title was revealed in September 2015.

== Critical reception ==
Professional ratings
Review scores
Source	Rating
AllMusic	4/5 stars
The Boston Globe	Positive

Stephen Thomas Erlewine of AllMusic rated the album four out of five stars and writes that the songs are "lively, clever, and bold, and further evidence of Bareilles' versatility, elegance, and wit." Additionally, The Boston Globe's Sarah Rodman calls it "a great pop album."

== Commercial performance ==
What's Inside: Songs from Waitress debuted at number ten on the US Billboard 200 chart, earning 30,000 album-equivalent units, (including pure album sales of 27,000 copies) in its first week. This became Barellies' fifth US top-ten album.

== Track listing ==
All tracks are written by Sara Bareilles.

No.	Title	Length
1.	"What's Inside"	1:16
2.	"Opening Up"	3:19
3.	"Door Number Three"	2:54
4.	"When He Sees Me"	3:51
5.	"Soft Place to Land"	2:58
6.	"Never Ever Getting Rid of Me"	2:26
7.	"I Didn't Plan It"	3:25
8.	"Bad Idea" (featuring Jason Mraz)	3:26
9.	"You Matter to Me" (featuring Jason Mraz)	4:11
10.	"She Used to Be Mine"	4:10
11.	"Everything Changes"	3:38
12.	"Lulu's Pie Song"	1:11
Total length:		36:45

== Personnel ==
Credits adapted from AllMusic.

Musicians

- Sara Bareilles – piano, vocals
- Neal Avron – cello
- Kallie Ciechomski – violin
- Jack Daley – bass
- Christine DiGiallonardo – background vocals
- Daniela DiGiallonardo – background vocals
- Nadia DiGiallonardo – piano, background vocals
- Yair Evnine – viola
- Rich Mercurio – drums
- Blake Mills – guitar
- Jason Mraz – vocals
- Lee Nadel – bass
- Jared Scharff – guitar
- Aaron Sterling – drums
- Zachary Rae – keyboards

Technical

- Neal Avron – engineer, mixing, production
- Vira Byramji – assistant engineer
- Yair Evnine – string arrangements
- Ted Jensen – mastering
- Phil Joly – assistant engineer
- Shervin Lainey – photography
- Scott Skrzynski – assistant engineer, mixing assistant
- Erich Talaba – engineer
- Elizabeth Ziman – string arrangements

== Charts ==
Chart (2015)	Peak position
Australian Albums (ARIA)	90
Belgian Albums (Ultratop Flanders)	156
Canadian Albums (Billboard)	63
US Billboard 200	10
