= Grief (disambiguation) =

Grief is a multi-faceted response to loss.

Grief may also refer to:

- Grief (band), an American sludge metal band
- "Grief" (Gargoyles), an episode of the animated TV series Gargoyles
- Grief (novel), by Andrew Holleran
- Grief (film), a 1993 film by Richard Glatzer
- Grief (photograph), a World War II photograph of civilians shot by the Germans
- "Grief", the colloquial name for the Adams Memorial statue in Washington, D.C.
- Grief, an alternate title of Lover's Grief over the Yellow River, a 1999 Chinese film
- "Grief" (Shifting Gears), an episode of the American TV series Shifting Gears

== People with the surname ==
- Howard Grief (1940–2013), Israeli lawyer
- Glenn Grief (born 1973), Australian rugby league player

== See also ==
- Good Grief (disambiguation)
- Griefer, a video gaming slang term
- Gene Greif (1954–2004), American graphic designer and cover artist
