= Brave Enough (disambiguation) =

Brave Enough is a 2016 album by Lindsey Stirling.

Brave Enough may also refer to:

- Brave Enough: Live at the Variety Playhouse, a 2013 album by Sara Bareilles
- Brave Enough, a 2016 album by Surinamese singer/songwriter Jeangu Macrooy
- Brave Enough, a 2015 book by Cheryl Strayed
- Brave Enough, a 2020 book by Jessie Diggins and Todd Smith
