= Amidst the Chaos: Live from the Hollywood Bowl =

Live album by Sara Bareilles
- Released: May 21, 2021
- Recorded: November 2, 2019
- Venue: Hollywood Bowl, Hollywood, California, United States
- Genre: Pop
- Length: 109:28
- Language: English
- Label: Epic
- Producer: Andrew Hewitt

Sara Bareilles chronology
Girls5eva: Music from the Peacock Original Series (2021)	Amidst the Chaos: Live from the Hollywood Bowl (2021)	Girls5eva: Season 2 (Original Series Soundtrack) (2022)

Amidst the Chaos: Live from the Hollywood Bowl is a 2021 live album by American singer-songwriter Sara Bareilles, released on Epic Records. The album has received positive reviews from critics.

== Recording and release ==
This album was recorded in November 2019, during Bareilles' first performance at the Hollywood Bowl and was released to coincide with a livestream concert event where she performed there again without an audience, due to the COVID-19 pandemic. The album was originally slated to be released in 2020, but was delayed due to the pandemic.

== Reception ==
The editorial staff of AllMusic Guide scored this album 4.5 out of five stars, with reviewer Stephen Thomas Erlewine praising her use of guest musicians and the mood to the music, calling this release "a testament to the breadth and accomplishment of Bareilles' songbook".

== Track listing ==
All songs written by Sara Bareilles, except where noted.

1. "Orpheus"/"Fire" – 6:13
2. "Poetry by Dead Men" (Bareilles and Justin Tranter) – 5:32
3. "Eyes On You" – 4:04
4. "I Choose You" (Bareilles, Jason Blynn, and Pete Harper) – 6:06
5. "Love Song" – 6:54
6. "Armor" – 5:24
7. "If I Can't Have You" (Bareilles, Emily King, and Aaron Sterling) – 6:01
8. "Miss Simone" (Bareilles and Lori McKenna) – 5:31
9. "Someone Who Loves Me" – 3:57
10. "Soft Place to Land" – 3:47
11. "You Matter to Me" – 3:06
12. "Bad Idea" – 3:17
13. "She Used to Be Mine" – 5:15
14. "Uncharted" – 3:55
15. "No Such Thing"/"Satellite Call" ("No Such Thing": Bareilles and Tranter) – 7:15
16. "Let the Rain" – 3:41
17. "King of Anything" – 7:46
18. "Brave" – 4:20
19. "Orpheus" – 4:50
20. "Gravity" – 7:09
21. "Saint Honesty" (Bareilles and McKenna) – 5:29
- "Soft Place to Land," which was performed as part of the Waitress medley, was erroneously titled "A Safe Place to Land" (a similarly-titled song off of Amidst the Chaos) on the physical album's track listing. This was corrected on streaming platforms.

== Personnel ==
- Sara Bareilles – piano, vocals

Additional musicians

- Amidst the Chaos Band: Butterfly Boucher, Misty Boyce, Solomon Dorsey, Charley Drayton, Melody Giron, Rich Hinman, Maria Im
- T Bone Burnett – on "Brave"/"Orpheus"
- Emily King – on "If I Can't Have You"
- The Milk Carton Kids – on "Someone Who Loves Me"
- Rob Moose – guest on "Gravity", music direction, string arrangement

Technical personnel

- Pete Giberga – executive production
- Andrew Hewitt – production
- Jeff Schulz – art direction and design

== Chart performance ==
Amidst the Chaos: Live from the Hollywood Bowl spent one week at number 20 on the Top Album Sales chart on July 5, 2021.

== See also ==
- List of 2021 albums
