= Brave Enough: Live at the Variety Playhouse =

Live album by Sara Bareilles
- Released: October 22, 2013
- Recorded: May 20, 2013
- Venue: Variety Playhouse (Atlanta)
- Length: 90:00
- Label: Epic
- Producer: Bryan Mir; Josh Adams

Sara Bareilles chronology
The Blessed Unrest (2013)	Brave Enough: Live at the Variety Playhouse (2013)	What's Inside: Songs from Waitress (2015)

Brave Enough: Live at the Variety Playhouse is singer-songwriter Sara Bareilles' second official concert recording released on CD and DVD. The recording was made at the Variety Playhouse in Atlanta, Georgia on May 20, 2013, at one of the stops of Bareilles' Brave Enough tour. On this tour, Bareilles performed solo, facing "what had up until that point been a pretty large fear", but ending up feeling that it was "one of [her] favorite experiences of [her] whole life".

== Singles ==
"Goodbye Yellow Brick Road" was sent to Hot/Modern/AC radio in the United States on December 2, 2013.

== Track listing ==
1. "Love on the Rocks / Bennie and the Jets"
2. "Uncharted"
3. "Love Song"
4. "(Sittin' On) The Dock of the Bay"
5. "Manhattan"
6. "Let the Rain"
7. "I Just Want You"
8. "Come Round Soon"
9. "Once Upon Another Time"
10. "Brave"
11. "King of Anything"
12. "Gravity"
13. "Goodbye Yellow Brick Road"

== Personnel ==
- Sara Bareilles – vocals, piano, guitar, harmonium
