= God Is Good =

God Is Good may refer to

- "God is good to Israel", Psalm 73:1

== Music ==
- God Is Good (Om album)
- God Is Good (Don Moen album)
- God Is Good!, album by Cody Carnes
- God Is Good, album by The Gaither Vocal Band

=== Songs ===
- "Yes, God is Good", hymn written by John Hampden Gurney
- "God Is Good", song by Paul McCartney and Carl Davis from Paul McCartney's Liverpool Oratorio
- "God Is Good", song by the Stranglers from Lies and Deception 2002, and compilation Gold
- "God Is Good", single by Deitrick Haddon 2005
- "God Is Good", single by Regina Belle from Love Forever Shines 2008
- "God is Good", single by Carl Carlton 2010
- "God Is Good", single by IShowSpeed, 2022

== Other ==
- God Is Good, Indian evangelical TV show by Sam P. Chelladurai

== See also ==
- "Allah Akbar", or "God is the greatest", similar phrase in Islam
- Good God (disambiguation)
