= Good God =

Good God may refer to:

- "Good God" (Korn song), a 1996 song by Korn
- "Good God" (Anouk song), a 2007 song by Anouk
- Good God (TV series), a Canadian television series which premiered in 2012
- Good God!, a 2022 EP by Rio Romeo

== See also ==
- Good Grief (disambiguation)
- God Is Good (disambiguation)
