= Gonna Get Over You =

Single by Sara Bareilles

from the album Kaleidoscope Heart
- Released: September 16, 2011
- Recorded: 2009–2010
- Studio: The Village Recorder (Los Angeles, CA)
- Genre: Pop rock; doo-wop
- Length: 4:16
- Label: Epic
- Songwriters: Sara Bareilles; Sam Farrar
- Producer: Neal Avron

Sara Bareilles singles chronology
"Uncharted" (2011)	"Gonna Get Over You" (2011)	"Love Is Christmas" (2011)

Ryan Tedder singles chronology
"Rocketeer" (2010)	"Gonna Get Over You" (2011)	"The Fighter" (2011)

Music video
- "Sara Bareilles - Gonna Get Over You (Official Video)" on YouTube

"Gonna Get Over You" is a song written and recorded by American singer Sara Bareilles. It was released as the third and final single from her second studio album Kaleidoscope Heart (2010). On September 20, a new version featuring Ryan Tedder was released exclusively on iTunes. Lyrically, the song speaks about getting over an ex-lover and is a "doo-wop pop song." It received a positive reception from most music critics, who noted it as one of the album's highlights and a "harmony post-breakup track." A music video, directed by actor Jonah Hill, was released on September 20, 2010. The video features Bareilles, wearing a leather jacket and a thick layer of black eyeliner, dancing through a supermarket aisle. Later in the video, Bareilles is joined by a group of identical leather jacket-wearing dancers who dance with her as she moves through the produce section.

== Background and reception ==
"Gonna Get Over You" was written by Bareilles and Sam Farrar, who is the bass guitar player for rock band Phantom Planet. Bareilles recorded a new version featuring additional vocals from OneRepublic's Ryan Tedder. The new version was released as a single on September 20, 2011 exclusively on iTunes. Jon Pareles wrote for The New York Times that "the "post-breakup ballad" is a "finger-snapping, modernized doo-wop concoction" and has "swooping harmonized lines, nonsense-syllable backups, antiphonal choirs and a chorus that revolves around a nugget of self-reliance: 'I’ll be all right, just not tonight/But someday'." Jim Farber of New York Daily News perceived that the track "strikes a marching beat, making a heartbreak song sound like a victory lap." Will Hermes of Rolling Stone considered it the best track on the album, writing that the song is "a playfully sexy bit of doo-wop pop." Allison Stewart of Washington Post called it a "rollicking, harmony-heavy pop song." Megan Vick wrote for Billboard that the song is a "mid-century piano parlor ditty." BBC Music's Mark Beaumont believed that the "hooks that intensify on Gonna Get Over You, which might as well be called Man, I Feel Like Shania."

== Music video ==
A music video for the song was released on September 20, 2011 and was directed by comedian Jonah Hill. Driving up to a Latino supermarket, Sara sports a pompadour and a rad jacket, bent upon converting daily shoppers into a gang of leather-clad dancers.

=== Background ===
Bareilles told AOL Music that the clip is, "a mash-up of Grease meets West Side Story meets a little market in East LA." She added: "Jonah and I both wanted it to be a combination of fantasy and reality. Silly, over the top moments that are anchored with authenticity."

=== Storyline ===
Rocking a leather jacket and wearing her hair in a ponytail and pompadour, Bareilles is romping around a grocery store. She's dancing from one aisle to another, creating a flash mob with some customers. The surreal scene, however, exists only in her daydream. Instead of being a cool girl who spreads toe-tapping fever to people around her, she's just a nerd who sings and dances awkwardly by herself. None of the customers and the patrons give any indication that they enjoy her impromptu performance. In fact, a security informs her that she makes the other people uncomfortable and tells her to leave the store.

=== Reception ===
MTV Buzzworthly Blog's Jenna Hally Rubenstein praised the video, writing that "Sara is rocking out HARD on the dance front and unsurprisingly, girlfriend can move." Hally also said that "her dance moves are amazing."

== Chart performance ==
The song's first appearance was on the Billboard's Adult Pop Songs chart at number thirty-nine. It fell out to number thirty-nine, the next week and it climbed to number thirty-five, so far.

== Live performances ==
Sara has performed the song at Walmart Soundcheck, on September 12, 2010. She also performed it alongside Cee Lo Green's hit "Forget You" on VEVO at The Warfield in San Francisco, on February 17, 2011.

== Charts ==
Chart (2011–12)	Peak position
South Korea International Singles (Gaon)	181
US Adult Pop Airplay (Billboard)	27
