= Good Grief =

Good grief is a minced oath of "good God". It can also refer to:

== Literature ==
- Good Grief (novel), a novel by Lolly Winston
- Good Grief, a book by Keith Waterhouse
- "Good grief", a catchphrase of the Peanuts character Charlie Brown

== Music ==
- Good Grief (Lucius album), 2016
- Good Grief, a 2024 album by Bernard Butler
- Good Grief (Sara Bareilles album), 2026
- "Good Grief" (song), a 2016 song by Bastille
- "Good Grief", a song by Spacey Jane from the album Sunlight
- "Good Grief", a song by Hayley Williams from the album Flowers for Vases / Descansos
- "Good Grief", song by Foo Fighters from the album Foo Fighters, 1995

== Television ==
- "Good Grief" (Arrested Development)
- "Good Grief" (Doctors)
- "Good Grief" (Frasier)
- "Good Grief" (Modern Family)
- Good Grief (TV series), an American TV series that aired on Fox for one season in 1990
- Good Grief, Charlie Brown: A Tribute to Charles Schulz, a 2000 television special
- Good Grief Moncrieff!, an Irish TV series that aired on RTĖ during summer 1996

== Other uses ==
- Good Grief, Idaho, an unincorporated community in the United States
- Good Grief (film), a film written and directed by Dan Levy

== See also ==
- Oh Good Grief!, a 1968 album by Vince Guaraldi
- Good God (disambiguation)
