= Once Upon Another Time =

EP by Sara Bareilles
- Released: May 22, 2012
- Length: 24:23
- Label: Epic
- Producer: Ben Folds

Sara Bareilles chronology
Kaleidoscope Heart (2010)	Once Upon Another Time (2012)	The Blessed Unrest (2013)

Singles from Once Upon Another Time
- 1. "Stay" Released: 21 April 2012

Once Upon Another Time is the fifth EP by American singer-songwriter Sara Bareilles, released on 22 May 2012.

The first single, "Stay", was released on Record Store Day 2012 only on 7" vinyl, accompanied by the vinyl-only B-side "Beautiful Girl".

== Commercial performance ==
Once Upon Another Time debuted at number eight on the US Billboard 200, selling 31,000 copies in its first week. This became Bareilles' third US top-ten debut. In its second week, the album dropped to number 66, its final week in the top 100.

== Track listing ==
All tracks are written by Sara Bareilles.

No.	Title	Length
1.	"Once Upon Another Time"	5:25
2.	"Stay"	4:24
3.	"Lie to Me"	4:00
4.	"Sweet as Whole"	4:39
5.	"Bright Lights and Cityscapes"	5:55
Total length:		24:23

== Personnel ==
=== Musicians ===
- Sara Bareilles – piano, acoustic and electric guitar, ukulele, synthesizer, harmonium (1), vocals
- Ruby Amanfu – harmony vocals (track 2)
- David Angell – violin (2)
- The Collective – backing vocals (track 2)
  - David Jennings
  - Daniel Ellsworth
  - Rachael Lampa
  - Kaleb Jones
  - Jonathan Lister
- Apple Mac
- Scott Attrill
- DB7
- Jim Sullivan
- David Davidson – violin (2)
- Sam Farrar – synthesizer, bass guitar, percussion
- Ben Folds – drums, bass guitar, piano, chimes
- Sari Reist – cello (2)
- Leslie Richter – harmony vocals (4)
- Kristin Wilkinson – viola (2)

=== Production ===
- Production, arrangement – Ben Folds
- Engineering, mixing – Joe Costa
- Assistant engineering – Leslie Richter
- Mastering – Bob Ludwig

== Charts ==
=== Weekly charts ===
Chart (2010)	Peak position
US Billboard 200	8
