= Good Grief (Sara Bareilles album) =

Studio album by Sara Bareilles
- Released: August 28, 2026
- Studios: Dreamland (Woodstock, New York); Long Pond (Hudson Valley)
- Length: 58:12
- Label: Epic
- Producers: Sara Bareilles; Aaron Dessner; Rob Moose

Sara Bareilles chronology
Into the Woods (2022 Broadway Cast Recording) (2022)	Good Grief (2026)

Singles from Good Grief
- 1. "Home" Released: June 3, 2026; 2. "Still Crying" Released: July 31, 2026; 3. "Just a Kid" Released: August 28, 2026

Good Grief is the seventh studio album by the American singer-songwriter Sara Bareilles. It was released on August 28, 2026, by Epic Records.

== Background ==
Good Grief is Bareilles' first studio album since Amidst the Chaos (2019). In a press release, Bareilles described Good Grief as a "collection of songs [that feel] like transmissions rather than a deliberate attempt to make sense of the world", adding that her goal with it was to "[provide] some kind of comfort or catharsis" to listeners who have navigated through grief, which is the central topic of this album.

The album was recorded at Dreamland Recording Studios in Woodstock, New York and album co-producer Aaron Dessner's Long Pond Studio in the Hudson Valley. The album was co-produced by Bareilles, Dessner, and Jonathan Low.

== Promotion ==
The album's lead single, "Home", was released on June 3, 2026 in tandem with the album's announcement. The song was inspired by a conversation Bareilles listened to between Stephen Colbert and Anderson Cooper on the latter's podcast in which the topics of grief and loss were discussed. The second single, "Still Crying", was released on July 31, 2026. On the album's release day, the music video for "Just a Kid" was released.

Bareilles will support the album with the release of a documentary film, titled Good Grief, and a headlining tour in the fall of 2026.

== Track listing ==
All tracks are written by Sara Bareilles, with additional writers noted.

Good Grief track listing
No.	Title	Writer(s)	Length
1.	"Home"		4:53
2.	"Just a Kid"		3:43
3.	"Still Crying"	Aaron Dessner	4:09
4.	"A Love Story"	Andrea Gibson	4:07
5.	"Hands Off My Body"		3:45
6.	"Ladies in a Line"		3:20
7.	"Heartland"		4:21
8.	"Capsize Me"		4:07
9.	"Nervous Breakdown"	Ingrid Michaelson	3:16
10.	"Idiot Heart"	Joe Tippett; Megan Falley; Dessner	3:16
11.	"Say Leave"		4:43
12.	"Salt Then Sour Then Sweet" (featuring Brandi Carlile)	Brandi Carlile; Gibson	3:27
13.	"Forever"		5:33
14.	"Wind Is the Weather"		5:32
Total length:			58:12

=== Note ===
- "A Love Story" contains a sample from "The Madness Vase" by Andrea Gibson.

== Personnel ==
Credits are adapted from the album's liner notes and Tidal.

=== Musicians ===
- Sara Bareilles – vocals (all tracks), dulcimer (track 1), piano (2–7, 10, 11, 13), shaker (3), drum programming (4, 5, 10), acoustic guitar (4, 12), synthesizer (5, 13), Wurlitzer (6, 8), keyboards (10), bass synthesizer (11, 13)
- Butterfly Boucher – electric guitar (1, 2, 8), piano (4, 5), vocals (5, 8), synthesizer (6); percussion, bass guitar (8); Mellotron (10)
- Charley Drayton – drum kit (1, 2, 4, 5, 8), percussion (1, 2, 5, 8, 10)
- Misty Boyce – synthesizer (1, 2, 5, 6, 8, 13), Hammond organ (1, 2, 8), piano (1, 2, 10); percussion, Clavinet, vocals (8)
- Solomon Dorsey – acoustic guitar (1, 8), upright bass (1, 10), bass guitar (2, 8), bass synthesizer (7, 13), vocals (8)
- Aaron Dessner – synthesizer (1, 4, 10, 14), resonator guitar (1, 6), bass guitar (3–5, 7, 10, 14), acoustic guitar (3, 4, 6, 10, 13), percussion (3, 4, 8), electric guitar (3, 4, 10), drums (3, 14); drum programming, piano (3); Mellotron (4, 8), drum kit (4), mandolin (6); high-string guitar, bass synthesizer, shaker, tambourine (10)
- Chris Thile – mandolin (1, 8)
- Rob Moose – electric guitar (2, 6, 8, 12), strings (3, 13), vocals (8), acoustic guitar (10, 12), string arrangement (12, 13); baritone guitar, bass guitar, piano, violin, viola (12)
- Rich Hinman – pedal steel (2, 6, 8, 13), acoustic guitar (4, 5, 13); electric guitar, piano (4)
- Madison Cunningham – electric guitar, 12-string acoustic guitar (2); acoustic guitar (5, 13), piano (5)
- Jonathan Low – bass guitar (2)
- JT Bates – drums (3, 14)
- Josh Dion – drum kit (4, 5, 10)
- Andrea Gibson – spoken word (4)
- Meshell Ndegeocello – bass synthesizer (5), bass guitar (8)
- Kurt Uenala – drum programming, synthesizer (5)
- Charity Dawson – vocals (8)
- Louis Cato – electric guitar (8)
- Jon Nellen – drums, percussion (12)
- Chris Morrissey – bass guitar (12)
- Brandi Carlile – vocals (12)
- Stuart Bogie – clarinet (14)

=== Technical and creative ===
- Sara Bareilles – production
- Aaron Dessner – production (3, 7, 10, 11, 14)
- Rob Moose – production, engineering (12); additional production (1, 2, 4–6, 8, 9, 11, 13), additional engineering (3, 13)
- Jonathan Low – co-production (1, 2, 4–6, 8–11, 13); engineering, mixing (1, 2, 4–6, 8–13)
- Butterfly Boucher – additional production (1, 2, 4–6, 8, 9, 11, 13)
- Misty Boyce – additional production (1, 2, 4–6, 8, 9, 11, 13)
- Solomon Dorsey – additional production (1, 2, 4–6, 8, 9, 11, 13)
- Charley Drayton – additional production (1, 2, 4–6, 8, 9, 11, 13)
- Bella Blasko – engineering, mixing (3, 7, 10, 14)
- Henri Bardot – engineering (12)
- JT Bates – additional engineering (14)
- Stuart Bogie – additional engineering (14)
- Alexander McKeon – engineering assistance (1, 2, 4–6, 8, 9, 13)
- John Miller – engineering assistance (1, 2)
- Beth Scott – engineering assistance (1, 2)
- Gillian Pelkonen – engineering assistance (3, 7, 10, 14)
- John Valesio – engineering assistance (4–6, 8, 11, 13)
- Lauren Marquez – engineering assistance (4–6, 8)
- Michael Deano – engineering assistance (4–6, 8)
- Ruairi O'Flaherty – mastering
- Thunderwing – creative direction, design
- Ian Allen – photography
- Jemma Muradian – hair
- Fiona Stiles – makeup
- Alicia Lombardini – styling

== Charts ==
Chart performance for Good Grief
Chart (2026)	Peak position
Australian Albums (ARIA)	75
UK Album Downloads (Official Charts)	18
US Billboard 200	35
