= Sara Bareilles =

American singer, songwriter, and actress (born 1979)

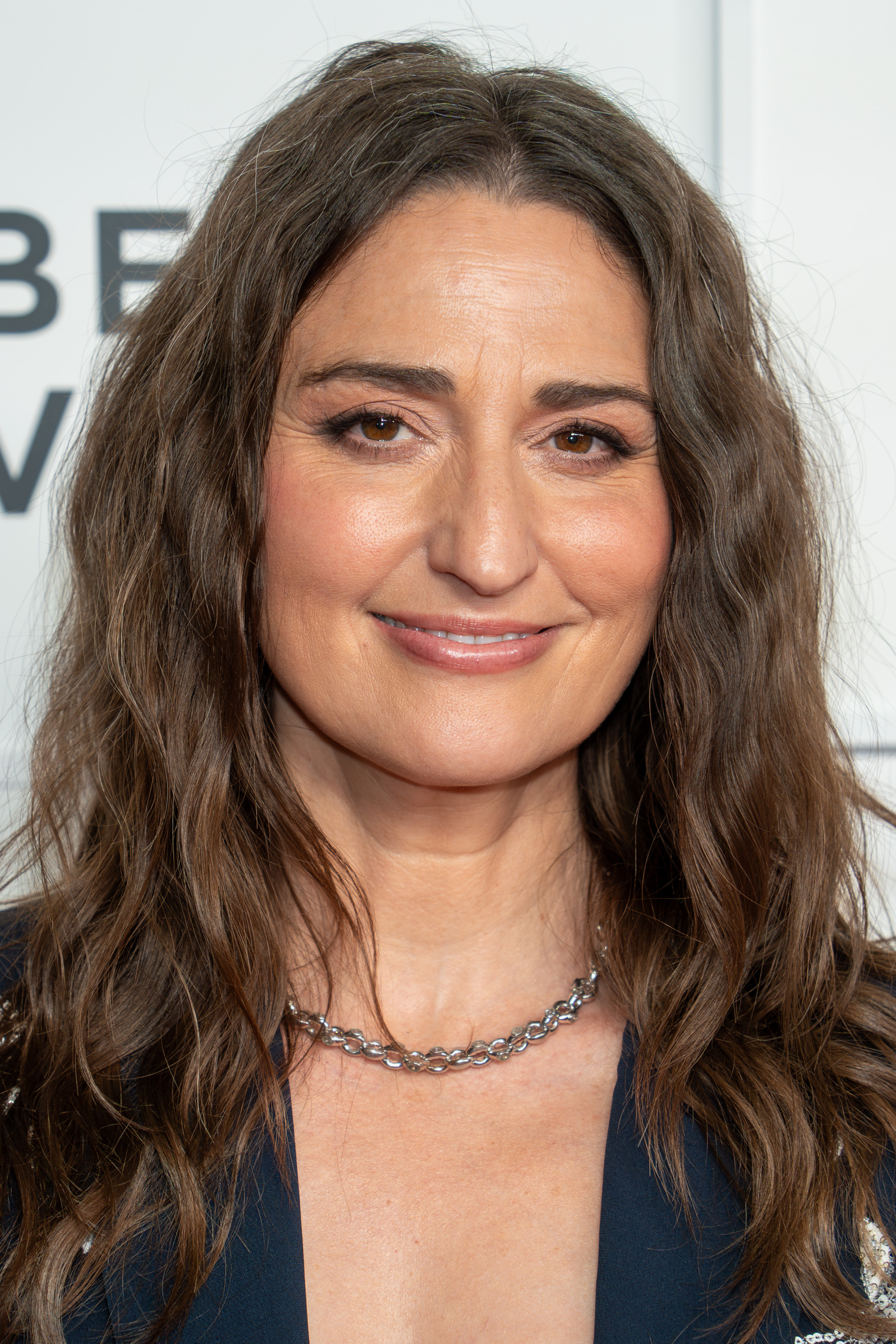
- Bareilles in 2025
- Born: Sara Beth Bareilles; December 7, 1979 (age 46); Eureka, California, U.S.
- Education: University of California, Los Angeles (BA)
- Occupations: Singer; songwriter; musician; actress
- Years active: 2002–present
- Spouse: Joe Tippett (m. 2025)
- Musical career
- Genres: Pop; soul
- Instruments: Vocals; piano; guitar
- Label: Epic
- Website: sarabmusic.com

Sara Beth Bareilles (/bəˈrɛlɪs/ bə-REL-iss; born December 7, 1979) is an American singer, songwriter, musician, and actress. She has sold over three million albums and over 15 million singles in the United States. Bareilles has earned various accolades, including two Grammy Awards, as well as nominations for four Primetime Emmy Awards and three Tony Awards. In 2012, VH1 named her one of the Top 100 Greatest Women in Music.

After signing with Epic Records, Bareilles rose to prominence with the release of her second studio album, Little Voice (2007). Its lead single, "Love Song", peaked at number four on the Billboard Hot 100 and earned nominations for Song of the Year and Best Female Pop Vocal Performance at the 51st Annual Grammy Awards. Her third studio album, Kaleidoscope Heart (2010), debuted atop the Billboard 200 while her fourth, The Blessed Unrest (2013), received a Grammy Award nomination for Album of the Year.

Bareilles made her Broadway debut when she composed music and wrote lyrics for the 2015 musical Waitress, for which she earned nominations for the Tony Award for Best Original Score and the Grammy Award for Best Musical Theater Album. She subsequently received Laurence Olivier Awards nominations for its 2019 West End transfer production. Her fifth studio album, What's Inside: Songs from Waitress (2015), includes several of the musical's songs, as well as some that were not included in the show. She has since worked on other Broadway productions, including the 2016 musical SpongeBob SquarePants and a revival of Stephen Sondheim's Into the Woods, both of which earned her Tony nominations.

Bareilles is also known for her work in television. In 2018, she received critical acclaim for her portrayal of Mary Magdalene in the NBC musical television special Jesus Christ Superstar Live in Concert, for which she was nominated for an Emmy. She played the lead role of Dawn Solano in Peacock and Netflix's musical comedy Girls5eva (2021–2024).

== Early life ==
Sara Beth Bareilles was born on December 7, 1979, in Eureka, California. Her father, Paul Bareilles, is an insurance adjuster, and her mother, Bonnie Jean (née Capellas), is a funeral home worker. Bareilles is the youngest of three daughters; she also has a younger half-sister. Bonnie has Portuguese ancestry through her father and maternal grandmother. Her maternal grandfather had German ancestry through his maternal grandfather. Paul has Swiss-Italian ancestry through his mother, Italian ancestry through his paternal grandmother, and French ancestry through his paternal grandfather. Bareilles speaks some Italian and lived in Bologna for a year during college. Her parents divorced when she was 12 years old, and Bonnie later married Ron Halvorsen.

Bareilles was raised Catholic and attended parochial school until junior high, when she transferred to public school. Although she does not identify as a Catholic anymore, she still attends Mass with her family when she visits Eureka. Bareilles participated in the high school choir, Limited Edition, and local community theater musical productions, including her high school's production of Little Shop of Horrors, in which she appeared as Audrey.

After graduating from Eureka High School in 1998, Bareilles studied communication studies at the University of California, Los Angeles (UCLA), where she was a member of the co-ed a cappella group Awaken a Cappella; she can be heard on their album Dysfunktional Family, singing her original selection "Gravity" and "I Want You Back" by the Jackson 5. The group's rendition of "Gravity" was featured on the Best of College a Cappella 2004 compilation CD. Bareilles and the pop rock band Maroon 5 have been acquainted since their college days at UCLA, when the latter was known as Kara's Flowers. Bareilles performed in the annual student concert UCLA Spring Sing, winning twice. She taught herself to play multiple instruments, including the piano.

== Career ==
=== 2002–2006: Career beginnings and Careful Confessions ===
After graduating from UCLA in 2002, Bareilles immediately wanted to pursue a career in the music industry, and started to perform at local bars and venues. She released two demos in 2003: The First One in April, and The Summer Sessions in October.

In January 2004, Bareilles self-published her first studio album, Careful Confessions. she supported Guster on their first UK tour, and co-headlined a tour with Jon McLaughlin. Also in 2004, she appeared as a singer in a bar in the award-winning indie film Girl Play, performing the song "Undertow"; her songs "Gravity" and "Fairy Tale" also appeared in the film.

She signed a contract with Epic Records on April 15, 2005, and spent the rest of the year and the early months of 2006 writing, composing and reworking songs for her upcoming album.

She was the opening act in 2006 for Marc Broussard's "Carencro" tour. Her song "Gravity" appeared briefly in the 2006 independent film Loving Annabelle.

In 2007, Bareilles toured with Rocco DeLuca and the Burden, Aqualung, and Mika, and later that year opened for several shows on both Maroon 5 and Paolo Nutini's U.S. tours. She opened for James Blunt on his U.S. tour in association with VH1 You Oughta Know.

=== 2007–2008: Breakthrough with Little Voice ===
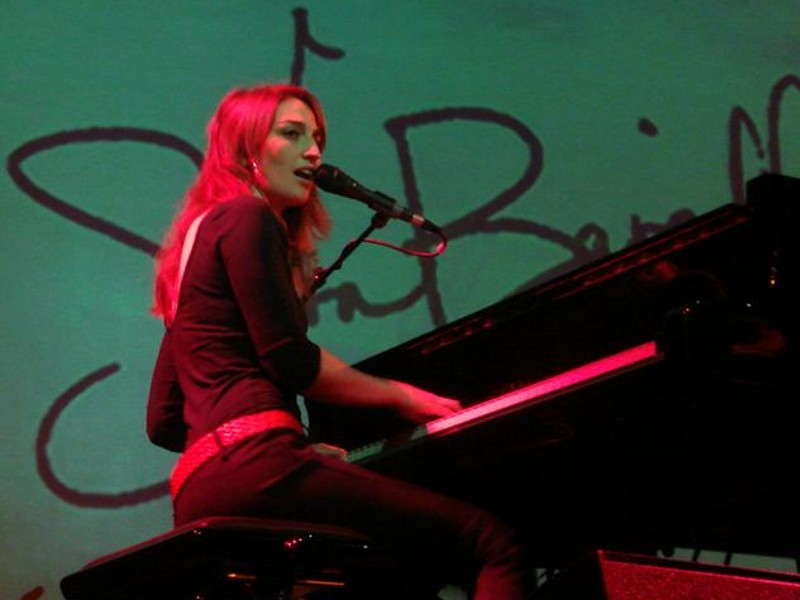
Bareilles's success with Little Voice led her to tour Europe; she is pictured here in her first tour of the Netherlands (2008).

In June 2007, iTunes featured Bareilles's single "Love Song" as the free single of the week. The song documents her frustration with the pressures of meeting the demands of Epic Records in creating her first album. On July 7, her label debut album, "Little Voice," was released. Six out of the twelve songs on the album were improved versions of songs from Careful Confessions.

In July 2007 Little Voice shot to No. 1 on the list of most downloaded albums of the music store in its first week of release, and debuted at No. 45 on the Billboard 200 chart. After being featured on a Rhapsody commercial in 2007, "Love Song" began climbing the pop charts, jumping from No. 73 to No. 16 in one week. It entered the top 10 on the Billboard Hot 100 on December 27, 2007, and peaked at No. 4. On other charts, such as the Pop 100 and Hot AC, "Love Song" hit No. 1. Bareilles performed the song on The Tonight Show with Jay Leno on Thursday, January 17, 2008, and on the Today show on Thursday, February 21, 2008. Soon after that, the song entered the UK singles chart, peaking at No. 4. The music video was directed by Josh Forbes, and it starred the British actor Adam Campbell.

As of 2010, Little Voice had been certified platinum by the RIAA. The album peaked in the Billboard 200 at No. 7, and the UK Top 40 at No. 9. Its breakthrough single, "Love Song", was later certified triple platinum.

On October 28, 2008, Bareilles released Between the Lines: Sara Bareilles Live at the Fillmore on DVD and CD. The package is a recording of her first headlining tour at The Fillmore in San Francisco. This package also included live recordings of her unreleased song "August Moon", as well as a cover of Otis Redding's "(Sittin' On) The Dock of the Bay". She concluded the tour in her home town of Eureka, California, on December 19, 2008, at the Arkley Center for the Performing Arts.

She toured with Counting Crows and Maroon 5 between July 25 and August 26, 2008. The first stop was Virginia Beach, Virginia, and the last stop Cuyahoga Falls, Ohio. Bareilles was selected as MTV artist of the week for July 7–11 and appeared again on The Tonight Show with Jay Leno on Wednesday, July 9, 2008; and on December 9, 2008 (with Ingrid Michaelson).

During the spring of 2009, Bareilles was on her second headlining tour, the Gravity Tour, to promote "Gravity", the third and final single from her album Little Voice. She made her third appearance in Charlottesville, Virginia, during the University of Virginia's annual Springfest on March 28, her first as the opener for Marc Broussard in 2005 and the second being an opening act for Maroon 5. Bareilles also played multiple college shows in April and May. Some were for college students only and others were open to the public.

She sent out a special holiday message to fans on her mailing list and gave out a free live acoustic EP recorded during her Gravity Tour. The EP contained seven acoustic songs, including a new song "Free Ride", "I'm on Fire" (a Bruce Springsteen cover duet with Tony Lucca), and two speaking segments.

In early 2010, Bareilles recorded video of what she called "An Ode to Jersey Shore" and posted it to her official website as a gag for fans.

=== 2009–2012: Kaleidoscope Heart and The Sing-Off ===
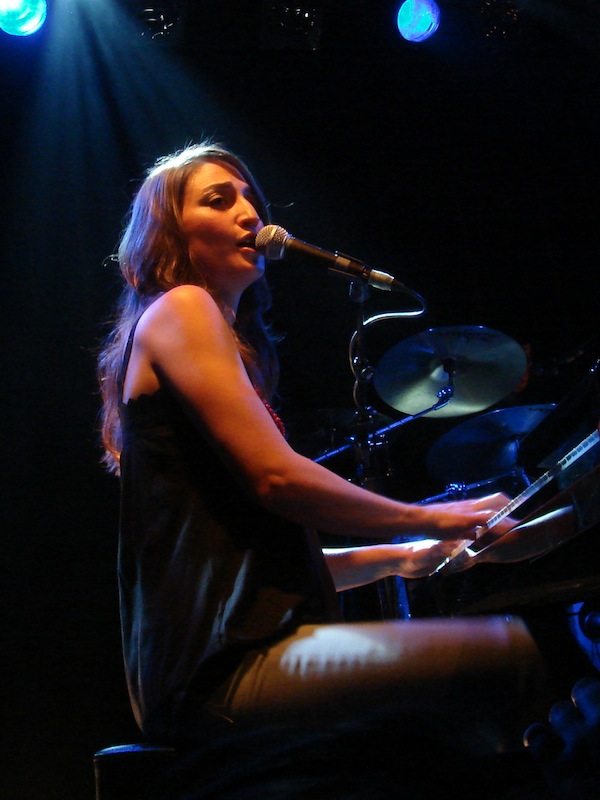
Bareilles at De Melkweg in Amsterdam in 2008

Exhausted by her rise to stardom and daunted at the prospect of writing another major hit—as documented in her song "Uncharted"—Bareilles experienced a period of writer's block, where she came to fear she would never write another song. She began work on the follow-up to her major label debut in the summer of 2009, collaborating with the likes of Ahmir "Questlove" Thompson, members of Weezer, and Pharrell Williams. As new songs began to take shape, Neal Avron was assigned to produce, record, and mix the entire album. Titled Kaleidoscope Heart, the album was recorded at The Village Recorder and Sunset Sound in Los Angeles.

The first single from Kaleidoscope Heart, "King of Anything", began receiving radio airplay in the United States in May 2010, and was released for sale in June. "King of Anything" had its first play on British radio airwaves on Paul Kay's Album Download show on Mid-Wales commercial radio station Radio Maldwyn – The Magic 756 in August 2010. "King of Anything" was later certified platinum by the RIAA.

In anticipation of the new album, Bareilles released a series of webisodes, featuring the making of select songs from Kaleidoscope Heart, including "King of Anything", "Uncharted", "Gonna Get Over You", "Bluebird", and a strings-only version of "King of Anything". The first webisode also contains Bareilles writing the chorus/refrain lyrics for "Hold My Heart". She was selected as VH1's Posted Artist of the Month for July 2010, chronicling her life leading up to the album's release.

Kaleidoscope Heart was released on September 7, 2010, and debuted at number 1 in the United States, selling 90,000 copies. Her previous album, Little Voice, re-entered the charts at number 200 in the same week, bookending the charts.

Bareilles toured in support of Kaleidoscope Heart from September to December 2010, with most of the shows being sold out. Bareilles toured Europe and parts of Asia and Australia with Maroon 5 throughout spring 2011. She embarked on a small headline tour in April 2011 with openers Elizabeth & the Catapult and Ximena Sariñana in support of the second single from Kaleidoscope Heart, "Uncharted", which concluded April 23, 2011, in Memphis, Tennessee. She also opened select shows for the country music duo Sugarland on their Summer 2011 Incredible Machine Tour. The third and final single released from Kaleidoscope Heart is "Gonna Get Over You", with a music video directed by Jonah Hill.

In May 2011, the song "Hold My Heart" from Kaleidoscope Heart was featured as the closing music in the seventh episode of the first season of Body of Proof, a made-for-TV medical crime drama starring Dana Delany.

Bareilles was added in the third season of the NBC television series The Sing-Off as a celebrity judge following the departure of Nicole Scherzinger, alongside Ben Folds and Shawn Stockman of Boyz II Men. Bareilles also guest-starred on Bucket & Skinner's Epic Adventures.

On August 13, 2011, the Hoosier Lottery Grandstand stage at the Indiana State Fair collapsed right after Bareilles finished performing as the opening act for Sugarland. She was uninjured, tweeting, "I'm speechless and feel so helpless; my heart aches for the lives lost." Seven people were killed, and more than 45 injured, in the collapse.

=== 2012–2014: Once Upon Another Time and The Blessed Unrest ===
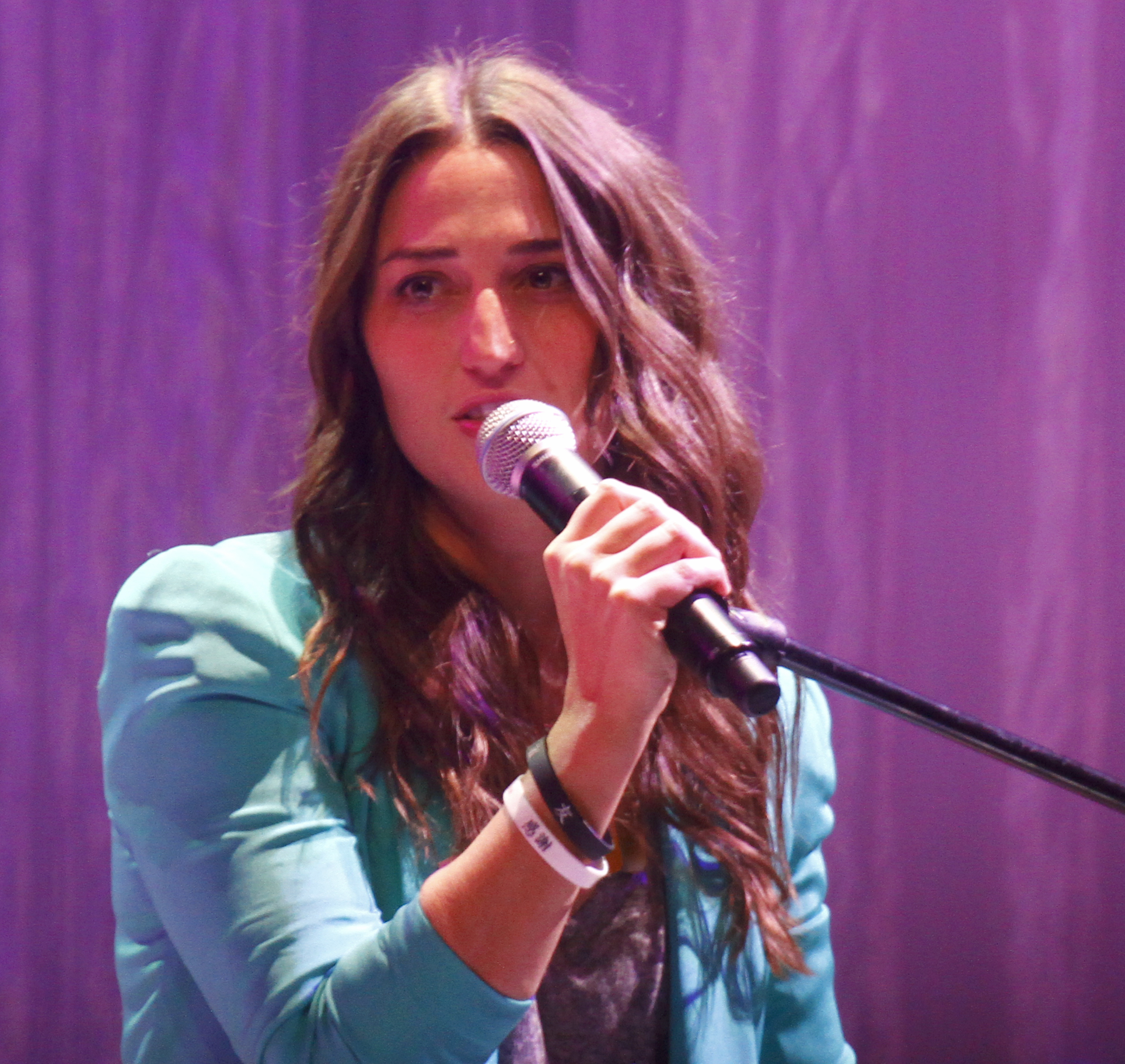
Sara Bareilles at the National Cherry Blossom Festival in 2012

Soon after joining The Sing-Off, Bareilles announced she was in the process of recording a new EP, with co-star Ben Folds producing it. She also collaborated with fellow singer songwriters Greg Laswell and Jon McLaughlin on their new singles in February. In March, she was slated to release A Trace of Sun, a documentary of the time she had spent volunteering in Japan after the 2011 Tohoku earthquake. Her EP, Once Upon Another Time, was released on May 22 and contained 5 new recordings. The first and only single from the EP, "Stay", was released on April 21, 2012, on 7" vinyl, exclusive to Record Store Day participants with a vinyl-only B-side, "Beautiful Girl".

During her Stageit show on September 10, 2012, Bareilles stated that she was working on a new record in New York. She also premiered a new song which might be appearing on the new album in question, which was titled "Only Shadows". In January 2013, she revealed the plans for what was to come later in the year. After moving to New York, Bareilles finished her record, and released the lead single from that album "soon" thereafter. In January, Bareilles was a featured artist of the a cappella group Straight No Chaser on the Jackson 5 song, "I Want You Back" which premiered on Billboard.

In February 2013, Bareilles began teasing her fans to her upcoming album through her Twitter and YouTube accounts. The first tease was a video she released on her website, titled "Sara is Making a Record...".

On March 27, 2013, Bareilles announced that she would conduct an 18-city tour to promote the new album. The first single, "Brave", was released digitally on April 23. On April 17, 2013, Bareilles released a lyric video for her single "Brave" on YouTube.

During the tour, she newly performed a unique cover, in haunting musical tones, of Elton John's "Goodbye Yellow Brick Road", which was filmed and recorded live at the Variety Playhouse in Atlanta, Georgia on May 20, 2013. (Though not on the immediately upcoming album, her performance of this cover song was ultimately included on her subsequent album/DVD Brave Enough: Live at the Variety Playhouse.)

The album she had been teasing, finally titled The Blessed Unrest, was eventually released on July 16, 2013.

Bareilles performed two songs for the feature film Bounty Killer, which was released in September 2013. The first, titled "The Kill", was written and composed by Will Collyer and Sujata Day. The second, titled "Gonna Getcha", was written and composed by Will Collyer and the film's director, Henry Saine.

Her live album, Brave Enough: Live at the Variety Playhouse, was released on October 22, 2013. The concert was recorded at the Variety Playhouse in Atlanta, Georgia.

In October 2013, two nurses from University of Minnesota Amplatz Children's Hospital Brittany Bloemke and Natalie Snyder, along with former patient Sarah Ewald, produced a YouTube video containing coworkers and young cancer patients dancing and singing to Bareilles's song "Brave". As of August 2019, it had over 1.6 million views. On October 31, 2013, while the trio were being interviewed by host Nischelle Turner on the HLN show Showbiz Tonight, Bareilles surprised them by Skyping into the interview. Of the video, she said: "I was sent this video by a friend of a friend who lives in Minnesota, and I watched it late at night and immediately my eyes welled up with tears. It's moments like this that remind me of the importance of music, and I can't think of a more perfect incarnation of this song. It's exactly the kind of thing that gives the life to this song that we were hoping for." On October 16, 2019, she visited the hospital before her show at the Xcel Energy Center to sing the song with them live.

On January 26, 2014, Bareilles performed a duet with Carole King at the 56th Annual Grammy Awards. The pair performed renditions of King's "Beautiful" and Bareilles's "Brave".

On April 28, 2014, Bareilles performed with Elton John at The Breast Cancer Research Foundation's Annual Hot Pink Party Fundraiser. As an intro prior to performing her song “Gravity” together as a duet, Elton John praised Bareilles’ recent cover of his famed song, “Goodbye Yellow Brick Road”. He expressed his thanks and amazement regarding her extraordinary cover:

I was so blown away by the version of Yellow Brick Road. I’ve never heard anyone sing one of my songs like that — ever. I can’t thank you enough for giving your time and blowing my mind with that version, because when someone sings your songs, they usually copy you, and she made it her own, you know. That’s brilliant. It’s a hard song!

In May of 2014, Bareilles recorded a cover of Jackie Wilson's song "(Your Love Keeps Lifting Me) Higher and Higher" for the Oprah Winfrey Network.

Bareilles toured 24 American cities between July 10, 2014, and August 14, 2014, in her The Little Black Dress Summer Tour. The tour supported her album The Blessed Unrest, and it featured opening performances by at least three "special guests": American singer Emily King, indie pop band Lucius, and Canadian singer Hannah Georgas.

Bareilles sang "Smile" during the In Memoriam" segment of the 66th Primetime Emmy Awards show on August 25, 2014.

=== 2015–2017: Waitress, Sounds Like Me, and What's Inside ===
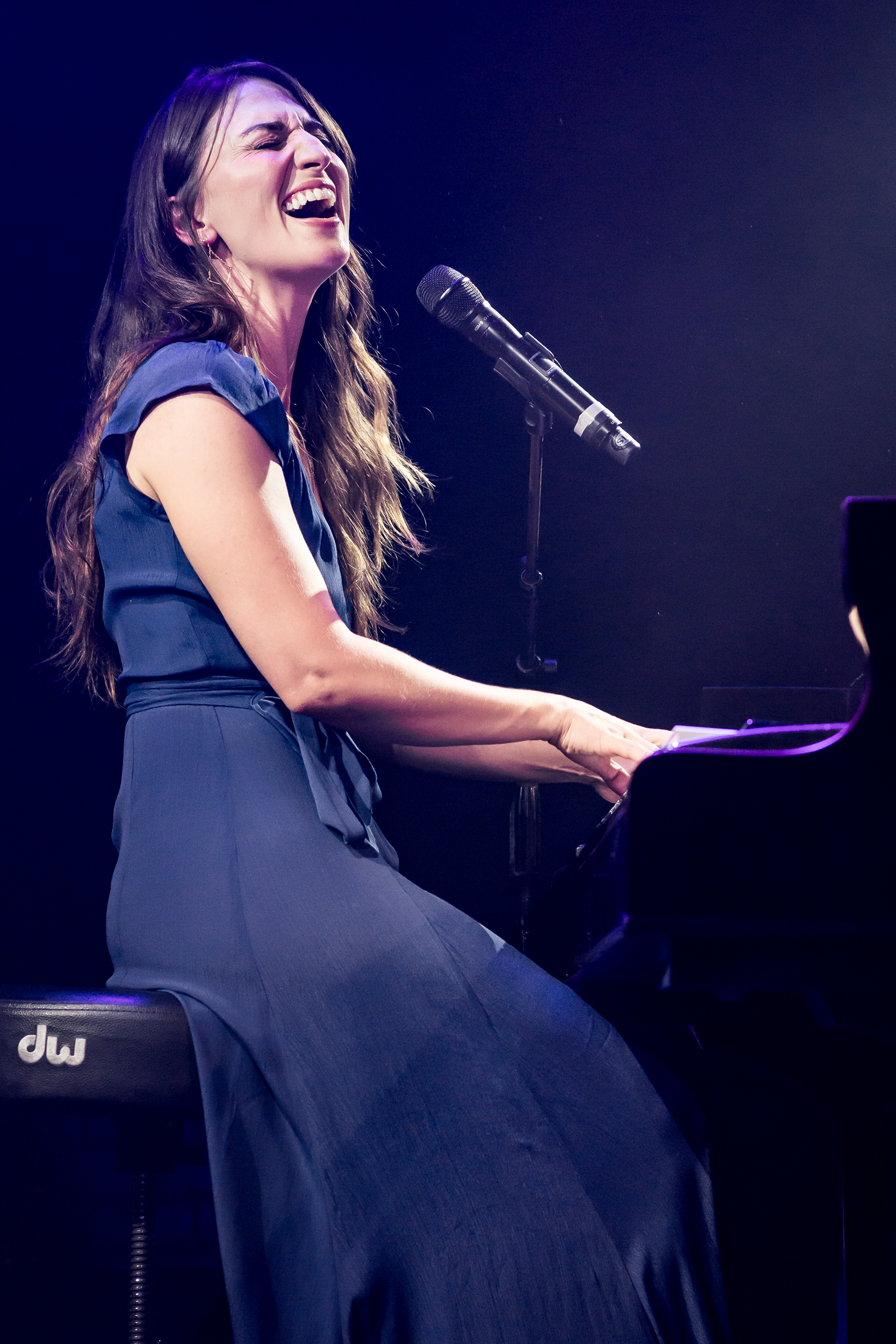
Bareilles in 2015

In June 2013, it was reported that Bareilles was to score Waitress, a musical adaptation of the 2007 film of the same title. The musical opened on August 20, 2015, produced by the American Repertory Theater. The production was directed by Diane Paulus, and it starred Jessie Mueller in the leading role. Bareilles debuted a song from the musical, "She Used to Be Mine", during some shows on her Little Black Dress Tour. On July 16, 2019, it was announced that Waitress would end its run on Broadway on January 5, 2020.

On October 25, 2012, Simon & Schuster announced it would publish a memoir written by Bareilles, containing essays and photos. The book was tentatively set for release in 2014; however, Bareilles finished it in March 2015. The title, Sounds Like Me: My Life (So Far) in Song, was announced in April 2015. The book was released on October 6, 2015. On October 25, 2015, it ranked 13th in The New York Times Best Seller list's hardcover nonfiction category.

Bareilles began work on her fifth studio album, What's Inside: Songs from Waitress, in April 2015 at New York City's Electric Lady Studios, in collaboration with producer Neal Avron, who had previously worked with Bareilles on Kaleidoscope Heart. In June 2015, Bareilles confirmed during a Google Hangouts Q & A session that the album would feature songs she had written and composed for Waitress, which would be reworked "to sound like Sara Bareilles songs." On June 27, 2015, Bareilles and Nadia DiGiallonardo performed "She Used to Be Mine", the album's lead single, with Rich Dworsky and The Berkshire Boys on humorist Garrison Keillor's National Public Radio show A Prairie Home Companion. The album was released on November 6, 2015, through Epic Records.

In June 2016, Bareilles performed the part of Ariel in a two-night live presentation of Disney's The Little Mermaid at the Hollywood Bowl. She performed the Joni Mitchell song "Both Sides, Now" during the In Memoriam homage at the 89th Academy Awards in February 2017.

On March 31, 2017, Bareilles took to the Broadway stage in the role of Jenna Hunterson in Waitress for a 10-week engagement. She would return to the role in January 2018 for a six-week run, including two weeks co-starring with friend and fellow musician Jason Mraz as Dr. Pomatter. Mraz had previously duetted with Bareilles on two songs featuring the Pomatter part on the What's Inside album. She returned to the role again in January 2019, for a four-week run opposite Gavin Creel as Dr. Pomatter.

Bareilles also co-wrote the original song "If I Dare" with Nicholas Britell and performed it for the 2017 movie Battle of the Sexes.

=== 2018–present: Amidst the Chaos, Into the Woods, television projects, and Good Grief ===
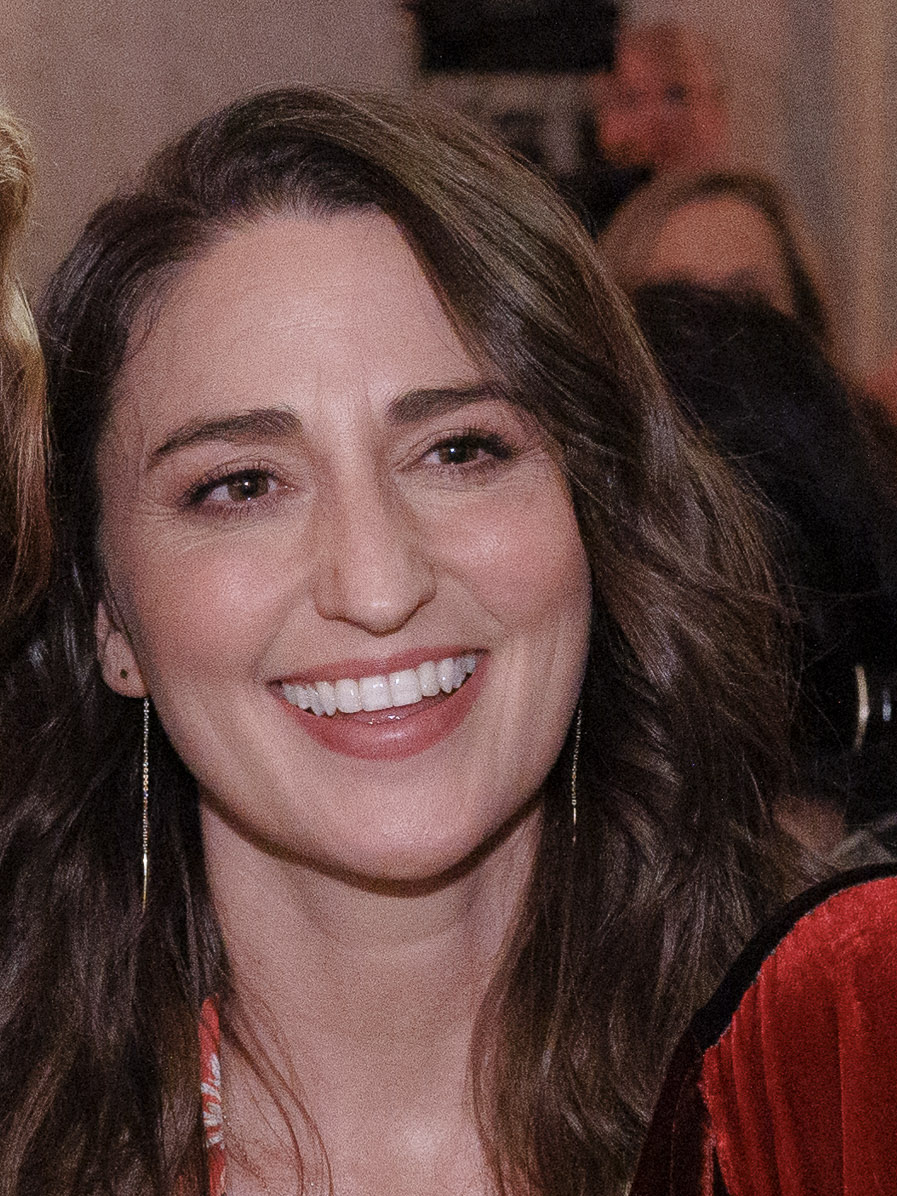
Bareilles in 2023

On April 1, 2018, Bareilles portrayed Mary Magdalene in Jesus Christ Superstar Live in Concert, NBC's stripped-down "concert" adaptation of Andrew Lloyd Webber and Tim Rice's first full stage musical. Bareilles was well received in the role by fans and critics and was nominated for the 2018 Primetime Emmy Award for Outstanding Supporting Actress in a Limited Series or Movie. and the 2019 Grammy Award for Best Musical Theatre Album.

On June 10, 2018, Bareilles hosted the 72nd Tony Awards with Josh Groban. She and Groban performed the opening number to the show, "This One's for You", which was an ode to those who would not win an award that night and referencing that neither had won a major award before, particularly noting the Grammy Awards. They also performed three other numbers, a medley tribute to Chita Rivera and Andrew Lloyd Webber, "8 Times a Week" (a parody of "Chandelier" by Sia), and "This One's for the Dreamers"). Bareilles was one of the composers who were nominated for the 2018 Tony Award for Best Original Score for SpongeBob SquarePants. She was nominated for two Primetime Emmy Awards for Outstanding Variety Special and Outstanding Original Music and Lyrics for her work at the 72nd Tony Awards.

In August 2018, it was announced that Waitress would premiere at the Adelphi Theatre in London's West End in February 2019.

In early 2017, Bareilles announced that she was working on a new album to be released by the end of 2018. The new album's first single, "Armor", was released on October 26, 2018. The same day, pre-orders for the new album were made available through the PledgeMusic direct-to-fan platform with an updated release target of Spring 2019. On February 13, 2019, Bareilles announced the title of her sixth album would be Amidst the Chaos. On April 6, 2019, the album debuted at number six on the Billboard 200 with 35,000 equivalent album sales, of which 29,000 were pure sales. She also released "Shiny", a song about "wanting moms to see how special they really are," on May 10, 2019, to coincide with Mother's Day.

On January 27, 2020, Bareilles made her West End debut, as Jenna Hunterson in Waitress at the Adelphi Theatre, opposite Gavin Creel as Dr. Pomatter. Bareilles was set to have a limited eight-week run to end on March 21, but performed her last show on March 14 and returned to the United States due to international travel restrictions related to the coronavirus outbreak. Bareilles also won the Grammy Award for Best American Roots Performance for the song "Saint Honesty" from her album Amidst the Chaos on January 27, 2020.

On March 25, 2019, Bareilles appeared on stage at an Apple event to announce that she, along with J. J. Abrams and Waitress collaborator Jessie Nelson, had developed a series for Apple TV+ entitled Little Voice, for which she had also recorded the theme song. Bareilles and Nelson collaborated on music for the series, which premiered on Apple TV+ on July 10, 2020. On September 4, 2020, Bareilles released an album titled More Love: Songs from Little Voice Season One with her own recordings of songs from the series.

On August 10, 2020, Bareilles was announced to star in Peacock's new musical comedy Girls5eva, created by Meredith Scardino and executive produced by Tina Fey and Robert Carlock. On May 6, 2021, all eight episodes of the first season of Girls5eva were released on Peacock.

On May 5, 2021, it was announced that Bareilles would reprise her role as Jenna in a limited revival production of Waitress following the reopening of Broadway theatres. The show opened at the Ethel Barrymore Theatre on September 2, 2021, with Bareilles playing the role through October 17. Amidst the Chaos: Live from the Hollywood Bowl was released in 2021.

In May 2022, Bareilles starred as the Baker's Wife in the Encores! production of Into the Woods at the New York City Center. She reprised the role in a Broadway revival at the St. James Theatre through September 4, 2022. She starred opposite Gavin Creel, Brian d'Arcy James, Joshua Henry, Phillipa Soo, Patina Miller, and Cheyenne Jackson. She received a Tony Award for Best Actress in a Musical nomination for the production.

In May 2023, to commemorate the centennial anniversary of The Walt Disney Company, Bareilles recorded a cover of "When You Wish Upon a Star" as part of the company's "100 Years of Wonder" campaign and was released as a single on May 14, 2023, after being performed live as part of Disney Night on season 21 of American Idol.

For the third season of Hulu series Only Murders in the Building, she co-wrote the song "Look for the Light" with Benj Pasek and Justin Paul which was performed by Meryl Streep and Ashley Park.

In late 2023, Bleecker Street, working with Fathom Events, released a live recorded version of Waitress: The Musical. Bareilles was a producer on the film which features her performance in the lead role of Jenna. In the first weekend, the movie made the top 10 of the box office. Even though the movie was only shown on 1,214 screens in the US and Canada, the movie made an estimated $3.2 million. The movie is now for sale on multiple streaming services, and on DVD and Blu-Ray.

On October 27, 2023, it was announced that Girls5eva, was renewed for a third season by Netflix.

On June 3, 2026, Bareilles announced her seventh studio album Good Grief, which was released on August 28, 2026.

== Artistry ==
=== Musical style and influences ===
In Sounds Like Me, Bareilles tells of the conflicting feedback she received on her way to winning a recording contract. Some prospective labels gave her the feedback that her voice was great, but she needed better songs; others told her that the songs were great, but her singing wasn't up to par. This experience was portrayed in the series Little Voice.

Bareilles is known for her strong mezzo-soprano vocal range. She is often compared to artists such as Regina Spektor, Fiona Apple and Billy Joel, due to her vocal ability and incorporation of piano into her music.

She has described her sound as "piano-based pop soul", with Bareilles finding inspiration from singers such as Etta James and Sam Cooke.

In an interview for The Huffington Post, Bareilles explained that writing and releasing one of her earliest singles, "Love Song", posed as a defining moment for her music career, since she was "fighting for the essence of some truth inside [of her], which to [her was] a beautiful love song."

She is often praised for her songwriting abilities, with critics stating she "conveys vulnerability and wisdom in lyrics that speak honestly about relationships from a woman's point of view", and that her "writing voice is uniquely her own".

=== Band members ===
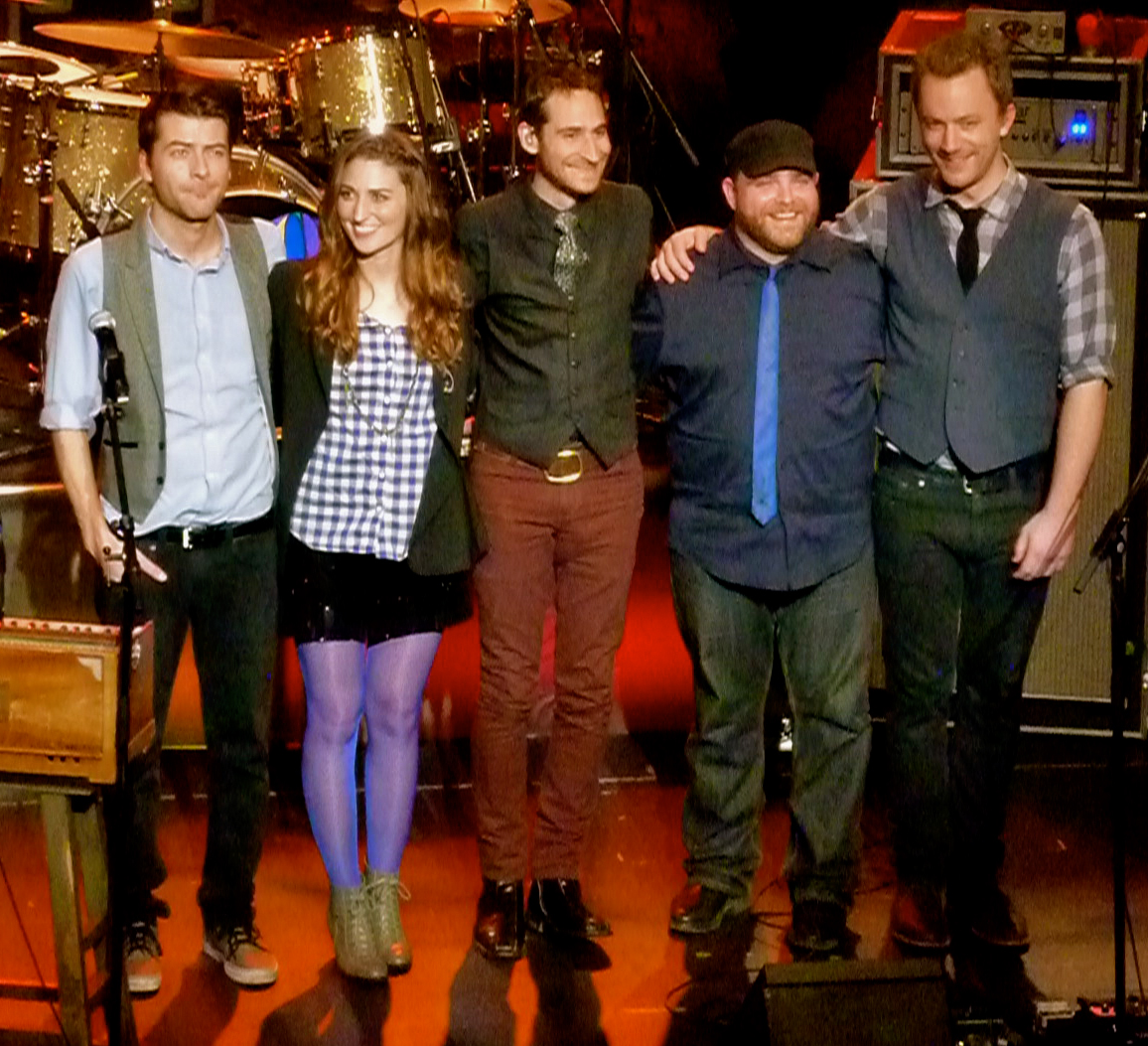
Bareilles and her former band during her Kaleidoscope Heart Tour at the Warfield on December 16, 2010. Left to right: Javier Dunn, Bareilles, Philip Krohnengold, Josh Day, and Daniel Rhine.

Bareilles's first band consisted of these members aside from Bareilles herself:

- Javier Dunn – guitar and vocals
- Daniel Rhine – bass guitar
- Josh Day – drums, percussion and backing vocals

Other musicians who have toured with her as part of her band include Eric Robinson (guitar and keys), Holly Conlan (backing vocals), Steve Goold (drums, percussion) and Philip Krohnengold (guitar and keyboards).

In 2013, Bareilles parted amicably with her longtime bandmates to "move in a new direction". She subsequently embarked on a short solo tour named Brave Enough, before forming a new band in anticipation of her fall co-headlining tour with OneRepublic. The new band consists of these personnel aside from Bareilles herself:

- Rich Hinman – guitar
- Steve Goold – drums, percussion
- Chris Morrissey – bass guitar
- Cara Fox and Christina Courtin – strings
- Misty Boyce – keyboards

=== Collaborations with other artists ===
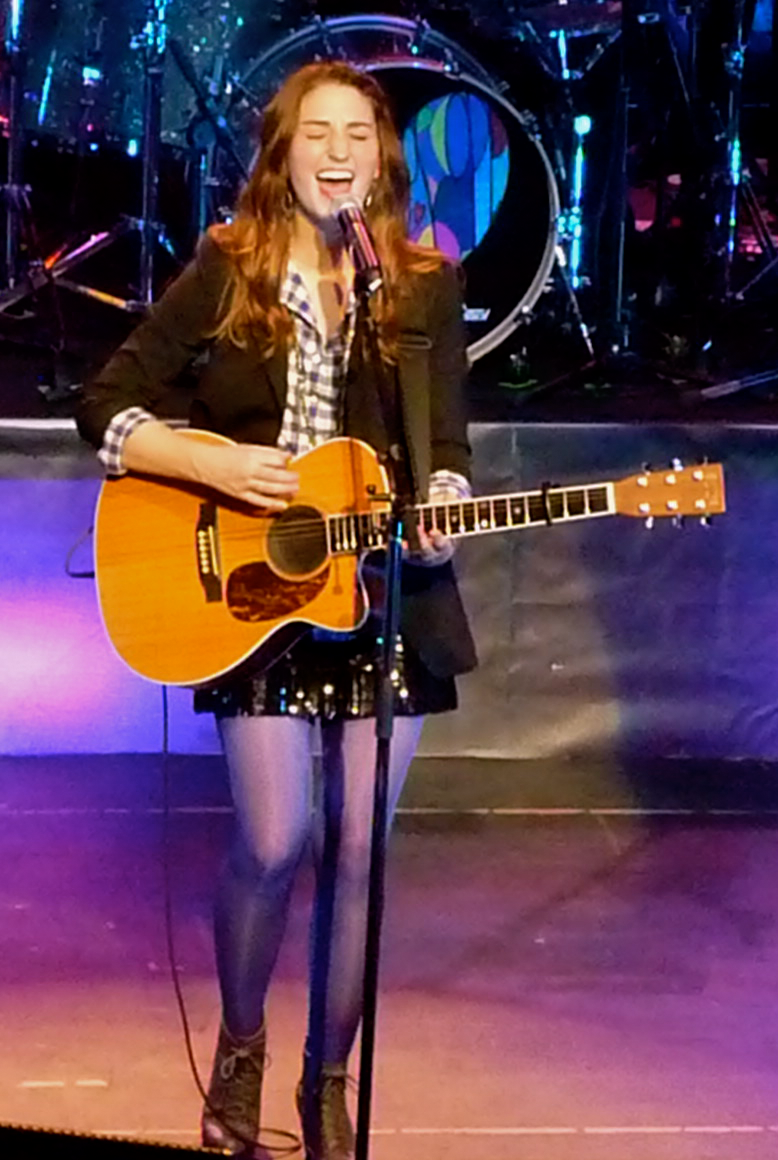
Bareilles at the Warfield in 2010

In December 2008, a single Bareilles had performed in collaboration with Ingrid Michaelson, titled "Winter Song", was released from the compilation The Hotel Cafe Presents Winter Songs. Bareilles and Michaelson performed it on The Tonight Show with Jay Leno, and an animated video was released. In December 2011, "Winter Song" reached number 2 on the Irish Singles Chart. She also recorded the song "Come Home", a duet with OneRepublic, which was released on iTunes on July 14, 2009.

Bareilles was one of many singers to appear in the season 3 finale of 30 Rock, including Mary J. Blige, Rachael Yamagata, Sheryl Crow, Norah Jones, and Elvis Costello. The episode was a parody of "We Are The World"-style rockstar fundraisers, with the group recording an impassioned plea for a kidney donation, specifically to help selfish character Jack Donaghy's newly discovered genetic father, played by Alan Alda.

Bareilles appeared with Weezer on Jimmy Kimmel Live and as an AOL Sessions guest, performing "(If You're Wondering If I Want You To) I Want You To", as well for a special performance on YouTube.

She has performed for the First Family numerous times:

- Bareilles was first invited by First Lady Michelle Obama to play at the G-20 Summit in Pittsburgh in September 2009. Here she performed songs for the First Ladies of 20 nations and afterward dined with Michelle Obama.
- The Obamas again invited her to perform at the Easter Egg Roll in 2010.
- On October 20, 2010, it was announced that Bareilles would open for President Obama at a Las Vegas rally for the Democratic midterm elections.
- In December 2010, Bareilles and fellow singer Ingrid Michaelson performed "Winter Song" for the Obamas and many spectators at the National Christmas Tree Lighting.

In 2011, as Maroon 5 was touring in promotion for their Hands All Over album, Bareilles contributed to the female vocals (originally belonging to Lady Antebellum) for the song "Out of Goodbyes".

She appeared with the band Sugarland for a cover of Dexys (Midnight Runners)'s "Come on Eileen" in a YouTube exclusive.

In December 2010, Bareilles appeared on the second-season finale of The Sing-Off to sing "King of Anything" with The Backbeats. She joined The Sing-Off as a judge in its third season alongside musicians Ben Folds and Shawn Stockman (of Boyz II Men). She and Folds sang the Frank Loesser classic "Baby, It's Cold Outside" on a Christmas-themed episode of the show in December 2011. Folds later produced, played on, and provided backing vocals on Bareilles's 2012 EP Once Upon Another Time. He provided the foreword to Sounds Like Me.

She performed the duet "Love Won't Let You Get Away" with Seth MacFarlane on his debut studio album, Music Is Better Than Words, and reunited to perform the song with him at Club Nokia on March 26, 2011.

Bareilles was featured on the track titled "Mango Tree", from the Zac Brown Band album titled Jekyll + Hyde, which was released on April 28, 2015. The song title was originally released under the title "Christmas Tree".

Bareilles was featured on "Summer is Over", the first single from Jon McLaughlin's third studio album, Promising Promises, a re-issue of his self-released album Forever If Ever. McLaughlin released the selection in January 2012.

MacFarlane's Christmas album Holiday for Swing, released on September 30, 2014, would also feature Bareilles. She joined him on another rendition of "Baby, It's Cold Outside". The album, which also featured collaborations with Norah Jones and Frank Sinatra's bassist Chuck Berghoffer as well as a 65-piece orchestra, was recorded at Abbey Road Studios in London.

Bareilles collaborated with Folds again in January 2018 at The Kennedy Center for his DECLASSIFIED: Ben Folds Presents concert series with the National Symphony Orchestra. Joined by violinist, singer, and Pulitzer Prize-winning composer Caroline Shaw, the orchestra performed classical music, modern compositions by Shaw, and five of Bareilles's songs, including "She Used to Be Mine" from Waitress. Shaw and Dominic Mekky would arrange the orchestral parts for a performance of "Love Song". Shaw and Folds joined the orchestra, on vocals and percussion respectively, to back Bareilles on "Brave". She, Folds, and Shaw harmonized together on "Once Upon Another Time".

== Personal life ==
Bareilles was in a relationship with former band member and guitarist Javier Dunn until 2013. In August 2015, she met actor Joe Tippett during an out-of-town tryout for Waitress at the American Repertory Theater, and they later began a relationship. The couple made their first public appearance at the Tony Awards two years later. They announced their engagement on New Year's Day in 2023 and married on October 4, 2025. Having lived in the West Village, Manhattan, New York City, Bareilles currently lives in Brooklyn and has a property in the Hudson Valley, New York. In 2026, she revealed that she had experienced a miscarriage and had undergone in vitro fertilization.

Bareilles considers herself "definitely sort of a feminist", saying, "I don't think that being a feminist has anything to do with hating anything. It's about celebrating women and being productive for females. I'm not one for seeing amazing, intelligent women being reduced to sex symbols." She has been a longtime ally of the LGBTQ+ community and cites her song "Brave" as being inspired by her friend's struggle with coming out.

== Discography ==
Studio albums

- Careful Confessions (2004)
- Little Voice (2007)
- Kaleidoscope Heart (2010)
- The Blessed Unrest (2013)
- What's Inside: Songs from Waitress (2015)
- Amidst the Chaos (2019)
- Good Grief (2026)

Soundtrack albums

- Jesus Christ Superstar Live in Concert (Original Soundtrack of the NBC Television Event) (2018)
- More Love: Songs from Little Voice Season One (2020)
- Girls5eva: Music from the Peacock Original Series (2021)
- Girls5eva: Season 2 (Original Series Soundtrack) (2022)
- Into the Woods (2022 Broadway Cast Recording) (2022)

== Acting credits ==
=== Film ===
Year	Title	Role	Notes
2004	Girl Play	Singer in Bar	
2012	A Trace of the Sun: Volunteering in Japan	Herself	Documentary
2023	Waitress	Jenna Hunterson	Live stage recording of musical
2025	Come See Me in the Good Light	None	Documentary; executive producer
TBA	The Delicate Medium	None	Short film; executive producer

=== Television ===
Year	Title	Role	Notes
2008	Lipstick Jungle	Herself	Episode: "Chapter Nine: Help!"
2009	30 Rock	Herself	Episode: "Kidney Now!"
2011	Bucket & Skinner's Epic Adventures	Herself	Episode: "Epic Rockstar"
2011	The Sing-Off	Herself / Judge	11 episodes
2011	No Ordinary Family	Herself	Episode: "No Ordinary Animal"
2013	Community	Balloon Guide	Episode: "Intro to Felt Surrogacy"
2016	Sesame Street	Herself	Episode: "Music Magic"
2017	Julie's Greenroom	Herself	2 episodes
2018	Jesus Christ Superstar Live in Concert	Mary Magdalene	Television special
2018	72nd Tony Awards	Herself/host	Television special
2019	Saturday Night Live	Herself / Musical Guest	Episode: "Kit Harington/Sara Bareilles"
2019	Carpool Karaoke: The Series	Herself	Episode: "Ben Platt & Sara Bareilles"
2020	Central Park	None	Episode: "Skater's Circle"; Songwriter: "Weirdos Make Great Superheroes"
2020	Little Voice	Herself	Episode: "Sing What I Can't Say"; Also executive producer
2021–2024	Girls5eva	Dawn Solano	Main role

=== Theater ===
Year	Title	Role	Dates	Location	Category	Notes	Ref.
2015	Waitress	-	August 2 – September 27, 2015	American Repertory Theatre	Regional; World premiere	Composer, lyricist, and orchestrator	
2016–2021	Waitress	-	March 25, 2016 – January 5, 2020 September 2 – December 20, 2021	Brooks Atkinson Theatre Ethel Barrymore Theatre	Broadway	Composer, lyricist, and orchestrator	
2016	The Little Mermaid	Princess Ariel	June 3–4, 2016	Hollywood Bowl	Concert		
2016	SpongeBob SquarePants	-	June 7 – July 3, 2016	Nederlander Theatre	Regional; World premiere	Composer/lyricist of "Poor Pirates"	
2017	Waitress	Jenna Hunterson	March 31 – June 11, 2017	Brooks Atkinson Theatre	Broadway	Composer, lyricist, and orchestrator	
2017–2022; 2026–2027	Waitress	-	October 17, 2017 – June 26, 2022; September 25, 2026 – June 27, 2027	-	Various North American Tours	Composer, lyricist, and orchestrator	
2017–2018	SpongeBob SquarePants	-	November 6, 2017 – September 16, 2018	Palace Theatre	Broadway	Composer/lyricist of "Poor Pirates"	
2018	Waitress	Jenna Hunterson	January 16 – March 11, 2018	Brooks Atkinson Theatre	Broadway	Composer, lyricist, and orchestrator	
2018	Jesus Christ Superstar	Mary Magdalene	April 1, 2018	Marcy Avenue Armory	Concert		
2019	Waitress	Jenna Hunterson	January 7 – February 3, 2019	Brooks Atkinson Theatre	Broadway	Composer, lyricist, and orchestrator	
2019–2020	Waitress	-	February 8, 2019 – March 14, 2020	Adelphi Theatre	West End	Composer, lyricist, and orchestrator	
2020	Waitress	Jenna Hunterson	January 27 – March 14, 2020	Adelphi Theatre	West End	Composer, lyricist, and orchestrator	
2021	Waitress	Jenna Hunterson	September 2 – October 17, 2021	Ethel Barrymore Theatre	Broadway	Composer, lyricist, and orchestrator	
2021–2022; 2026	Waitress	-	September 4, 2021 – October 31, 2026	-	Various UK & Ireland Tours	Composer, lyricist, and orchestrator	
2022	Into the Woods	The Baker's Wife	May 4–15, 2022	New York City Center	Off-Broadway	Encores!	
2022	Into the Woods	The Baker's Wife	June 28 – September 4, 2022	St. James Theatre	Broadway		
2023	Gutenberg! The Musical!	The Guest Producer	November 4, 2023	James Earl Jones Theatre	Broadway	One night cameo	
2025	Redwood	-	February 13 – May 18, 2025	Nederlander Theatre	Broadway	Co-Producer	

== Awards and nominations ==
Year	Association	Category	Nominated work	Result	Ref.
2008	ASCAP Pop Music Awards	ASCAP Vanguard Award	Herself	Won	
2009	Grammy Awards	Song of the Year	"Love Song"	Nominated	
2009	Grammy Awards	Best Female Pop Vocal Performance	"Love Song"	Nominated	
2011	Grammy Awards	Best Female Pop Vocal Performance	"King of Anything"	Nominated	
2011	BDSCertified Spin Awards	700,000 Spins	"Love Song"	Won	
2012	MVPA Awards	Best Directional Debut	"Gonna Get Over You"	Nominated	
2012	MVPA Awards	Best Choreography	"Gonna Get Over You"	Won	
2014	World Music Awards	World's Best Song	"Brave"	Nominated	
2014	iHeartRadio Music Awards	Song of the Year	"Brave"	Nominated	
2014	MTV Video Music Awards Japan	Best Choreography	"Brave"	Nominated	
2014	Grammy Awards	Best Pop Solo Performance	"Brave"	Nominated	
2014	Grammy Awards	Album of the Year	The Blessed Unrest	Nominated	
2014	American Music Awards	Favorite Adult Contemporary Artist	Herself	Nominated	
2014	Global Music Awards	Gold Medal Award: Singer-Songwriter	Herself	Won	
2016	Tony Awards	Best Original Score	Waitress	Nominated	
2016	Drama Desk Awards	Outstanding Music	Waitress	Nominated	
2016	Drama Desk Awards	Outstanding Lyrics	Waitress	Nominated	
2016	Outer Critics Circle Awards	Outstanding New Score (Broadway or Off-Broadway)	Waitress	Nominated	
2017	Grammy Awards	Best Musical Theater Album	Waitress	Nominated	
2017	Broadway.com Audience Awards	Favorite Female Replacement	Waitress	Won	
2017	Hollywood Music in Media Awards	Original Song – Featured Film	"If I Dare"	Nominated	
2018	Tony Awards	Best Original Score	SpongeBob SquarePants	Nominated	
2018	Primetime Emmy Awards	Outstanding Supporting Actress in a Limited Series or Movie	Jesus Christ Superstar Live in Concert	Nominated	
2019	Grammy Awards	Best Musical Theater Album	Jesus Christ Superstar Live in Concert	Nominated	
2019	Primetime Emmy Awards	Outstanding Original Music and Lyrics	72nd Tony Awards (Song: "This One's for You")	Nominated	
2019	Primetime Emmy Awards	Outstanding Variety Special (Live)	72nd Tony Awards	Nominated	
2020	Grammy Awards	Best American Roots Performance	"Saint Honesty"	Won	
2020	Olivier Awards	Best Original Score or New Orchestrations	Waitress	Nominated	
2020	Olivier Awards	Best New Musical	Waitress	Nominated	
2023	Grammy Awards	Best Musical Theater Album	Into the Woods	Won	
2023	Tony Awards	Best Actress in a Musical	Into the Woods	Nominated	
2023	Drama Desk Awards	Outstanding Lead Performance in a Musical	Into the Woods	Nominated	
2023	Drama League Awards	Distinguished Performance	Into the Woods	Nominated	
2024	Primetime Emmy Awards	Outstanding Original Music and Lyrics	"The Medium Time" (from Girls5eva)	Nominated	
2024	Hollywood Music in Media Awards	Best Original Song in a TV Show/Limited Series	"The Medium Time" (from Girls5eva)	Nominated	
2026	Society of Composers & Lyricists Awards	Outstanding Original Song for a Dramatic or Documentary Visual Media Production	"Salt Then Sour Then Sweet" (from Come See Me in the Good Light)	Nominated	
2027	Grammy Awards	Best Traditional Pop Vocal Album	Good Grief	Pending	
2027	Grammy Awards	Best American Roots Performance	"Still Crying"	Pending	
2027	Grammy Awards	Best Americana Performance	"Heartland"	Pending	
