= She Used to Be Mine =

Single by Sara Bareilles

from the album What's Inside: Songs from Waitress
- Released: September 25, 2015
- Studio: Electric Lady Studios (New York, NY)
- Genre: Pop
- Length: 4:10
- Label: Epic
- Songwriter: Sara Bareilles
- Producers: Neal Avron; Sara Bareilles

Sara Bareilles singles chronology
"I Choose You" (2014)	"She Used to Be Mine" (2015)	"Armor" (2018)

Music video
- "Sara Bareilles - She Used To Be Mine (Official Video)" on YouTube

"She Used to Be Mine" is a song written by American singer-songwriter Sara Bareilles for Waitress, her musical adaptation of the 2007 film. It was recorded by Bareilles for her fifth studio album, What's Inside: Songs from Waitress (2015), and was released to digital retailers as its lead single on September 25, 2015.

The song was recorded by Jessie Mueller for the cast recording of the Broadway production of Waitress in 2016, and performed by Mueller and Bareilles at the 70th Tony Awards. The song was also featured as a bonus track on country singer Jennifer Nettles' Broadway album Always Like New ahead of her taking over the role of Jenna from Bareilles in October 2021.

== Composition ==
"She Used to Be Mine" is a sentimental ballad written and composed by Bareilles with a duration of four minutes and ten seconds (4:10). The song is accompanied primarily by the piano and also features guitar and drums. Bareilles' vocal performance has been described as "powerful", with a vocal range of F_{3} to D_{5}. According to the digital sheet music published by Sony/ATV Music Publishing, the song is composed in the key of F major with a "moderately slow" tempo. Lyrically, the song discusses losing one's sense of self and struggling with changes in circumstances, sung from the perspective of the musical's protagonist, Jenna.

== Critical reception ==
Madison Vain of Entertainment Weekly called the song "delicate, nostalgic, and wonderfully theatrical," in the magazine's "7 Tracks We Loved This Week" feature and praised the song as "a beautiful introduction" to the musical's story. Charles Isherwood of The New York Times said it is a “gentle but wrenching song, featuring a melody that soars and then recedes in waves, is the high point of the show—and for that matter a high point of the Broadway season. Suddenly, a pleasant and polished but weightless musical comedy rises to transporting heights, and sweeps up your heart along with it.”

== Context within the musical ==
This number takes place in Act 2 of the musical Waitress, when Jenna, the protagonist, is reflecting on her life. Jenna thinks about the kind of person she once was and how her life has disappointed her. Bareilles explained the story behind this song during a Reddit AMA: "I wrote it for the scene in the movie where the lead character, Jenna, feels like she's lost all hope of saving herself from her terrible situation, and she's reflecting on who she thought she would have become.

== Expansion beyond Broadway ==
Bareilles, in an interview with The New York Times, said that "the range of who this song speaks to is much broader than I could have anticipated ...The chasm between who we are, and who we thought we would be, is always something we’re negotiating ... In the life of 'Waitress', people make an assumption that it's a very feminine show, and it is, and I love that. But these themes go so far beyond gender." Jesse Green, the co-chief theater critic for the Times, reflects that "the emotional content has a classic arc from sadness and self-criticism to acceptance and triumph."

=== Live performance ===
"She Used To Be Mine" was performed at the 2016 Tony Awards by Bareilles and Jessie Mueller. The song was once again performed as a duet with Canadian singer Rufus Wainwright during the holiday special Sara Bareilles: New Year’s Eve with the National Symphony Orchestra & Friends, which aired on PBS stations in the United States on December 31, 2024.

== Commercial performance ==
"She Used to Be Mine" was the most-added song on hot adult contemporary (Hot AC) radio the week of its release, according to radio monitoring organization Mediabase. The song debuted at number 40 on the Billboard Adult Pop Songs chart on the chart dated October 17, 2015.

== Charts ==
Chart (2015)	Peak position
US Adult Pop Airplay (Billboard)	26
US Digital Song Sales (Billboard)	49

Chart (2019–2020)	Peak position
Scottish Singles Sales (Official Charts)	24
UK Singles Downloads (Official Charts)	72

== Certifications ==
Certifications for "She Used to Be Mine"
Region	Certification	Certified units/sales
New Zealand (RMNZ)	Gold	15,000^{‡}
United Kingdom (BPI)	Silver	200,000^{‡}
^{‡} Sales+streaming figures based on certification alone.

== Release history ==
Country	Date	Format	Ref.
Various	September 25, 2015	Digital download	
United States	September 28, 2015	Hot adult contemporary radio	
