= Uncharted (song) =

Single by Sara Bareilles

from the album Kaleidoscope Heart
- Released: January 13, 2011
- Recorded: 2009–2010
- Studio: The Village Recorder (Los Angeles, CA)
- Genre: Pop rock; baroque pop
- Length: 3:35
- Label: Epic
- Songwriter: Sara Bareilles
- Producer: Neal Avron

Sara Bareilles singles chronology
"King of Anything" (2010)	"Uncharted" (2011)	"Gonna Get Over You" (2011)

Music video
- "Sara Bareilles - Uncharted (Director's Cut)" on YouTube

"Uncharted" is a song written and recorded by the American singer Sara Bareilles. The song was produced by Neal Avron. It was the second single of her album Kaleidoscope Heart.

== Background and history ==
Bareilles told Billboard magazine that she "...was really worried about stepping into the unknown and I didn't know what to expect the second time around... and that afternoon, I sat down and wrote 'Uncharted'." The album title, 'Kaleidoscope Heart', comes from the lyric of 'Uncharted', "Jump start my kaleidoscope heart, love to watch the colors fade... They may not make sense but they sure as hell made me". Bareilles stated the song to be the starting point of the new record, and this particular lyric saw the end to her writer's block.

== Critical reception ==
Jim Farber of New York Daily News wrote that: "Uncharted, matches jaunty piano figures to a spritz of strings." Megan Vick wrote for Billboard that: "With "Uncharted," Bareilles puts a syncopated two-step beat to a heartbreak anthem as she belts out about being unable to deal with a failed relationship."

== Music video ==
On 9 November 2010, official behind-the-scenes photographs were posted to Sara's official site, showing director Laurent Brie, director of previous single 'King of Anything', filming the video. The pictures showed Sara in various outfits, including a Geisha girl costume. However, nothing more was stated about the concept of this video, and it was believed to be scrapped for a new version.

A music video was released on March 1, 2011 featuring artists including Adam Levine and Jesse Carmichael of Maroon 5, Josh Groban, Pharrell Williams, Jennifer Nettles of Sugarland, Ben Folds, Ryan Tedder of OneRepublic, Laura Jansen, Ingrid Michaelson, Vanessa Carlton, Tegan and Sara, Cary Brothers, Greg Laswell, Adam Gardner and Ryan Miller from Guster, and Keenan Cahill.

The video was produced by musician Travis Schneider, with the concept coming from Sara's guitar player and long-time friend, singer/songwriter Javier Dunn.

In a blog entry on her official site, Bareilles described the reason behind the concept;

"This video is about my journey as an artist who looks up to the people around them. This is about being a fan of people who take chances, who are fearless, who have integrity, and go off into the world saying yes to what's around them. It's filled with some of the people in my life who do that everyday [sic]. They have impacted my world and are not only incredible artists, but great friends as well. They all worked this giant favor into their very busy lives and helped me out more than I can say."

== Charts ==
Chart (2011)	Peak position
Hungary (Rádiós Top 40)	35
US Bubbling Under Hot 100 (Billboard)	16
US Adult Alternative Airplay (Billboard)	17
US Adult Pop Airplay (Billboard)	13
