= Amidst the Chaos =

Studio album by Sara Bareilles
- Released: April 5, 2019
- Studio: Sound City (Van Nuys, California); The Village (Los Angeles, California)
- Length: 49:46
- Label: Epic
- Producer: T Bone Burnett

Sara Bareilles chronology
What's Inside: Songs from Waitress (2015)	Amidst the Chaos (2019)	More Love: Songs from Little Voice Season One (2020)

Singles from Amidst the Chaos
- 1. "Armor" Released: October 26, 2018; 2. "Fire" Released: February 15, 2019

Professional ratings
Review scores
Source	Rating
AllMusic	4/5 stars

Amidst the Chaos is the sixth studio album by American singer-songwriter Sara Bareilles, released on April 5, 2019, through Epic Records. The lead single from the album, "Armor", was released digitally on October 26, 2018. The album debuted at number six on the US Billboard 200 selling 35,000 copies in its first week (29,000 of which were traditional album sales), making it Bareilles' sixth top 10 album. "Saint Honesty" earned Bareilles a Grammy Award for Best American Roots Performance at the 2020 ceremony.

== Background ==
In an interview with Forbes, Bareilles stated that the 2016 American Presidential Election was the catalyst for her beginning to write the album, with the title being a reference to the presidency of Donald Trump. The song "No Such Thing" was written as an ode to president Barack Obama, while "Armor" was written in response to the #MeToo Movement and released early in light of the confirmation hearing of Supreme Court Justice Brett Kavanaugh. The duet with John Legend, "A Safe Place to Land", was written about the immigrant family separation crisis along the US–Mexico border in 2018.

== Promotion ==
The lead single, "Armor", was released on October 28, 2018, with Bareilles performing the song on The Late Show with Stephen Colbert on November 28, backed by an all-female band. She announced the album on February 13, and said it would become available to pre-order on February 15. She also posted the cover art, a black-and-white shot of herself with "windblown hair".

Prior to the album's release, Bareilles embarked upon the four-date A Little Chaos Tour, stopping in San Francisco, Los Angeles, Chicago and New York City between March 17 and 22, 2019. Bareilles performed several unreleased songs from the album, as well as its promotional singles. On April 6, 2019, Bareilles appeared as a musical guest on Saturday Night Live and performed "Fire" and "Saint Honesty".

A November 2019 Hollywood Bowl performance was recorded and released in 2021 as Amidst the Chaos: Live from the Hollywood Bowl.

== Track listing ==
Amidst the Chaos track listing
No.	Title	Writer(s)	Length
1.	"Fire"	Sara Bareilles	3:50
2.	"No Such Thing"	Bareilles; Justin Tranter	3:57
3.	"Armor"	Bareilles	4:27
4.	"If I Can't Have You"	Bareilles; Emily King; Aaron Sterling	4:13
5.	"Eyes on You"	Bareilles	4:04
6.	"Miss Simone"	Bareilles; Lori McKenna	4:13
7.	"Wicked Love"	Bareilles	4:39
8.	"Orpheus"	Bareilles	4:13
9.	"Poetry by Dead Men"	Bareilles; Tranter	3:48
10.	"Someone Who Loves Me"	Bareilles	3:18
11.	"Saint Honesty"	Bareilles; McKenna	4:35
12.	"A Safe Place to Land" (featuring John Legend)	Bareilles; McKenna	4:29
Total length:			49:46

Digital edition
No.	Title	Writer(s)	Length
13.	"Shiny"	Bareilles; McKenna	2:53
Total length:			52:39

== Personnel ==
Musicians

- Sara Bareilles – vocals; piano on tracks 2, 3, 5, 7, 9, 11, 12; programming on tracks 1, 2, 3, 9; electric guitar on track 5
- John Legend – vocals on track 12
- Emily King – vocal harmonies on track 4
- Jim Keltner – drums on tracks 1, 4, 5, 6, 7, 10, 12; percussion on tracks 5, 9
- Jay Bellerose – drums on tracks 2, 3, 8, 9, 11, 12; percussion on track 12
- Mike Piersante – percussion on tracks 1, 4, 7, 11
- Dennis Crouch – acoustic bass on all tracks; electric bass on track 8
- Zachary Dawes – electric bass on track 5; 6-string bass on track 7
- Marc Ribot – guitar on tracks 3, 4, 5, 6, 7, 9, 10, 12; ukulele on track 10
- Blake Mills – guitar on tracks 1, 2, 8, 11; mandolin on track 1, 6-string bass on track 2
- Joseph Ryan – guitar on track 10; vocal harmonies on track 10
- T Bone Burnett – guitar on track 8
- Patrick Warren – keyboards on all tracks except 1, 10, 11
- Keefus Ciancia – keyboards on tracks 3, 9
- Philip Krohnengold (misspelled "Khronengold" in booklet) – piano on track 4
- Gabriel Johnson – trumpet on track 3

Production

- Produced by T Bone Burnett
- Executive producer: Pete Giberga
- Second engineers: Billy Centenaro, Karl Wingate, Joseph Lorge
- Edited by Jason Wormer
- Recorded at The Village, West Los Angeles, California and Sound City Studios, Van Nuys, California
- Mixed at the Village, West Los Angeles, California
- String arrangements by Patrick Warren
- Copying by Danita Ng-Poss; Jason Poss
- Equipment manager and production: Zach Dawes
- Guitar technicians: Patrick Benson, Joseph Lorge
- Piano technician: Carl Lieberman, RPT
- Mastered by Gavin Lurssen at Lurssen Mastering, Burbank, California
- Production coordinator and contractor: Ivy Skoff

== Charts ==
Chart performance for Amidst the Chaos
Chart (2019)	Peak position
Australian Albums (ARIA)	25
Canadian Albums (Billboard)	35
Scottish Albums (OCC)	28
Spanish Albums (PROMUSICAE)	69
UK Albums (OCC)	82
US Billboard 200	6
