= Elizabeth & the Catapult =

American pop-rock band

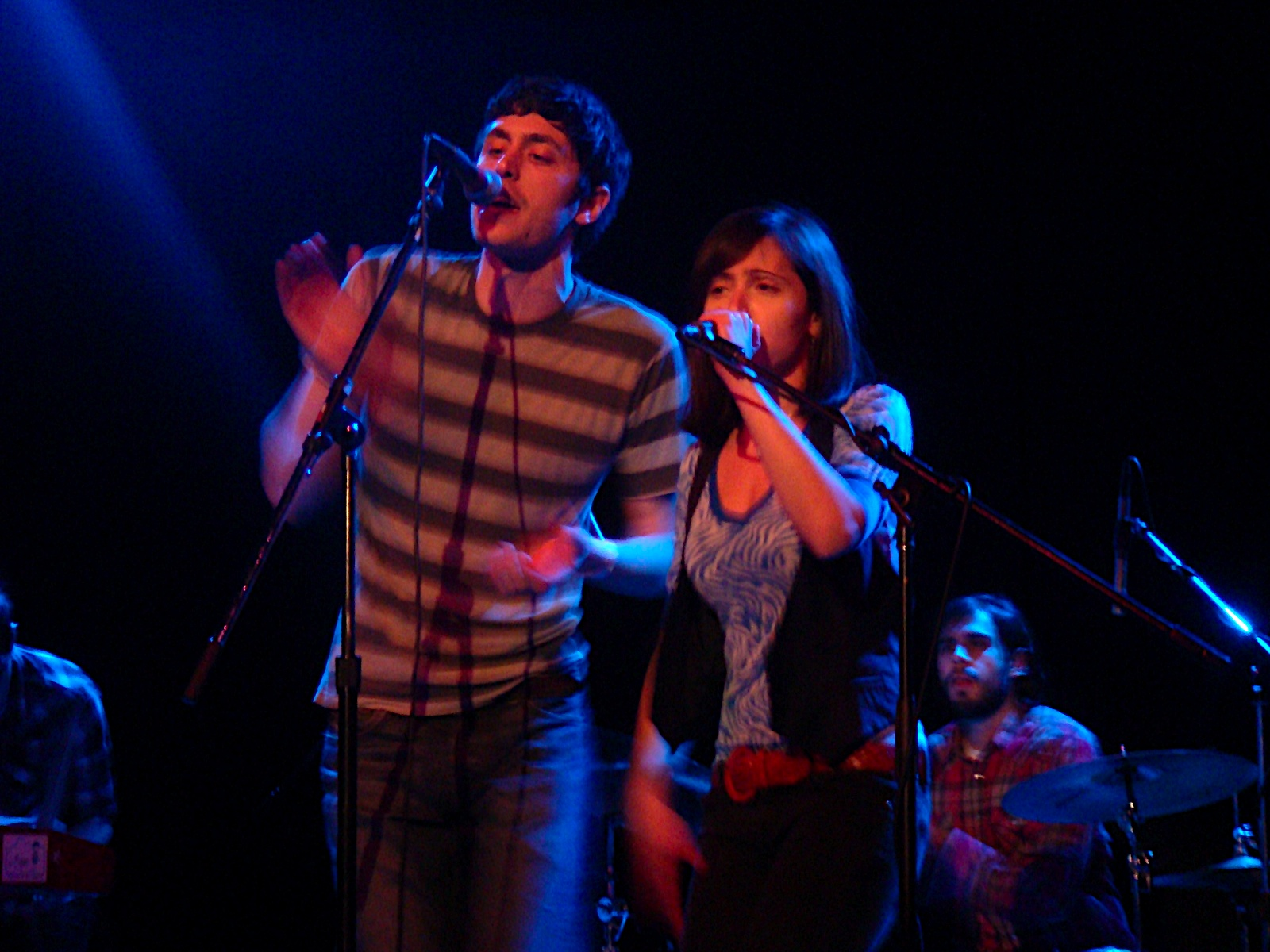
- Jeff Taylor and Elizabeth Ziman Concert NYC 2008

Background information
- Origin: Brooklyn, New York, United States
- Genres: Indie pop Indie rock
- Years active: 2004–present
- Labels: Verve Records; Thirty Tigers; Compass Records
- Members: Elizabeth Ziman; Adam Minkoff
- Past members: Dan Molad; Pete Lalish; Jonno Linden; Dylan Aiello; Hannah Winkler
- Website: www.elizabethandthecatapult.com

Elizabeth & the Catapult is a Brooklyn–based project by the American singer-songwriter Elizabeth Ziman. They have released six studio albums.

== History ==
Ziman, who grew up in Greenwich Village, trained from youth as a classical pianist, writing her first songs on an upright piano at age 6. She attended the Berklee College of Music on a scholarship to study classical composition, and was awarded the 2001 ASCAP Leiber and Stoller scholarship for her song "Like Water is to Sand." Her original plans to pursue film scoring were changed in 2002 when Patti Austin came to Berklee to recruit background vocalists for an Ella Fitzgerald tribute tour. Ziman toured with Austin for 18 months, causing her subsequent compositional style to draw heavily from jazz vocalists such as Fitzgerald, Nina Simone, Billie Holiday and Sarah Vaughan. She met Esperanza Spalding through the Patti Austin band and Spalding eventually played bass in Ziman's first band while still attending Berklee.

Ziman met Lucius drummer and fellow student Dan Molad and Esperanza Spalding at a party during their final semester at Berklee, and they began performing together shortly afterward. Esperanza Spalding left the band soon after and Guitarist Pete Lalish (Lucius), another Berklee student, later joined the band after Ziman saw him performing at a Boston bar and invited him to collaborate. After Ziman and Molad completed their studies, the band moved to Brooklyn in early 2005. Using Molad's home studio, the band financed, recorded and produced an EP, Elizabeth & The Catapult in 2006. The band was the featured Billboard Underground Artist for October 2006, and signed with Verve Records in 2008.

== Taller Children ==
Having been popular on New York's Lower East Side, the band achieved a measure of national notoriety in the spring of 2009 with their first album under Verve, Taller Children. The band chose to travel to Omaha, Nebraska to record the album in the studio of Mike Mogis. Elizabeth wrote all the songs on the album with the exception of the Leonard Cohen cover "Everybody Knows", and several of the tracks were derived from demos recorded previously in Molad's home studio. The album was recorded quickly, and the band returned to New York shortly thereafter and released the album in June 2009.

== The Other Side of Zero ==
In 2009, Ziman was commissioned by John Schaefer of NPR's Soundcheck to write a song cycle for a Lincoln Center show. Having gone through a band breakup, Ziman turned to Leonard Cohen's poetry collection Book of Longing. Ziman and Molad, now working as a duo, recorded demos for much of the new album, The Other Side of Zero, at Molad's father's home in Austin, Texas, before following their record label's suggestion of working with a producer. Molad suggested Tony Berg, and the band moved into the studio to complete the album. With the departure of Pete Lalish, guitar parts on the new album were covered by Berg and by Blake Mills. The title track features Gillian Welch and David Rawlings, who had visited the studio during recording and chose to participate after Ziman encouraged them to listen to the track. The album was released in October 2010.

== Like It Never Happened ==
In 2014 she performed at Madison Square Garden opening for Sara Bareilles and wrote music with Ben Folds. In 2014, Like it Never Happened was released by Thirty Tigers and produced by Dan Molad, Peter Lalish, and Paul Loren with string arrangements by Rob Moose. In 2015, Like it Never Happened was nominated for best album, best song, and best video by The 14th Annual Independent Music Awards and "Someday Soon" won the award in the "Folk/Singer-Songwriter Song" category.

== Keepsake ==
Keepsake, the fourth album from Elizabeth & the Catapult and the first on Compass Records, was released on October 20, 2017. It was produced by Dan Molad, Richard Swift and Elizabeth Ziman.

== sincerely, e ==
On December 8, 2020, Elizabeth and the Catapult announced their fifth studio album sincerely, e on Flood Magazine, as well as sharing an early preview of the first single "pop the placebo". The album was entirely recorded and inspired during the ongoing quarantine of the COVID-19 pandemic, and was released on March 5, 2021 via Compass Records.

== Discography ==
- Taller Children (Verve, 2009)
- The Other Side of Zero (Verve, 2010)
- Like It Never Happened (Thirty Tigers, 2014)
- Keepsake (Compass, 2017)
- sincerely, e (Compass, 2021)
- Responsible Friend (Compass, 2026)
