= Kaleidoscope Heart =

Studio album by Sara Bareilles
- Released: September 7, 2010
- Recorded: 2009–2010
- Studio: The Village Recorder (Los Angeles)
- Genres: Pop rock; soul
- Length: 50:43
- Label: Epic
- Producer: Neal Avron

Sara Bareilles chronology
| Little Voice (2007) | Kaleidoscope Heart (2010) | Once Upon Another Time (2012) |

Singles from Kaleidoscope Heart
- 1. "King of Anything" Released: May 10, 2010; 2. "Uncharted" Released: January 13, 2011; 3. "Gonna Get Over You" Released: September 16, 2011

Kaleidoscope Heart is the third studio album by American singer-songwriter Sara Bareilles, which was released on September 7, 2010, through Epic Records. The lead single from the album, "King of Anything", was released digitally on May 10, 2010.

The album debuted at number one on the US Billboard 200, selling 90,000 copies in its first week. The album was certified gold by the Recording Industry Association of America (RIAA).

== Background ==
Bareilles stated on her website the reason behind the album's title, "I picked out the name of the record months before I even finished writing the songs. I love the imagery of those words, and they’re really representative of how I envision my heart. It's a colorful but fragmented, ever-changing sum of all the bits and pieces that make it up. A kaleidoscope is the tool that helps make sense of the mess. Or at least makes it nice to look at."

She also stated she suffered from "writer's block" after her second album, Little Voice; however, upon writing the song "Uncharted", she drew inspiration from this song to write the rest of the record. The title of the album, "Kaleidoscope Heart" was chosen by Bareilles from the lyric in the bridge of "Uncharted".

== Promotion ==
On May 12 (Canada) and May 14 (USA), during the fourth-season finale of Brothers & Sisters, a new song from Bareilles was played during a scene of the show. It was confirmed by www.abc.com that the song is called "Uncharted". On June 1, the track list and release date were released online.

Three promotional singles and the entire album were made available before the release of the album. On August 23, 2010, the track "Hold My Heart" was released exclusively for streaming on Whole Foods' website. On August 25, 2010, the track "Uncharted" was released exclusively for streaming on the Entertainment Weekly website. On August 27, 2010, the track "Gonna Get Over You" was released exclusively for streaming on Barnes & Noble's website. On August 31, 2010, the full album was made available for stream on www.iheartradio.com.

She performed "King of Anything" on The Tonight Show with Jay Leno on September 3, 2010, as well as on Regis & Kelly and The Today Show on September 7, 2010. On September 21, 2010, Bareilles performed on The Late Late Show with Craig Ferguson.

== Singles ==
"King of Anything" was the lead single of the album. It was released on radio in the United States on May 10, 2010, and went on sale in June 2010. It peaked at number 32 on the US Billboard Hot 100, becoming her second top 40 hit on the chart (after "Love Song" became her first). In the Netherlands it fared even better, reaching number 21.

The second single from the album was "Uncharted", and was released to radio in the United States in January 2011. It peaked at number 13 on Billboard Adult Pop Songs chart and number 16 on the US Bubbling Under Hot 100 chart.

The third and final single was "Gonna Get Over You", with a music video directed by Jonah Hill. It was added to the Hot AC on September 19, 2011. The song debuted on Billboard Adult Pop Songs at number 39 eventually climbing to number 35. The music video was released on YouTube at September 22, 2011.

== Critical reception ==
Professional ratings
Review scores
| Source | Rating |
|---|---|
| AllMusic | 4/5 stars |
| Daily News | 3/5 stars |
| Entertainment Weekly | (B−) |
| Los Angeles Times | 3/4 stars |
| New York Times | (positive) |
| PopMatters | (4/10) |
| Rolling Stone | 2.5/5 stars |
| Sputnikmusic | (4.1/5) |
| The Washington Post | (positive) |

Kaleidoscope Heart received a 68% on Metacritic, resulting from generally favorable reviews. Stephen Thomas Erlewine from AllMusic rated the album with 4 stars out of 5 and has claimed positively that "Despite lushly detailed arrangements, Bareilles never pushes this distinctly commercial gift too hard, letting the songs flow easily and this gentleness is almost as appealing as those classically constructed melodies, tunes so softly insistent they could conceivably appear on adult contemporary charts anytime from 1971 to 2010". Jon Pareles from The New York Times was also positive regarding the album, saying that "When Ms. Bareilles goes for more straightforward tugs on the heartstrings, she often sounds like Sarah McLachlan's gifted apprentice, complete with Ms. McLachlan's trademark of going breathy at the top of a phrase". Ann Powers from Los Angeles Times claimed that "The singer-songwriter's background in university show choirs serves her well here, as she finds strength in complex vocal arrangements and the sorts of dramatic set-ups that have reminded us, through Fox's popular television show, that the very act of raising our voices can be a hugely liberating act". Mikael Wood from Entertainment Weekly was favorable, saying that "On Kaleidoscope Heart, sometimes, as in the airless Breathe Again, all that earnest yearning can make you feel like you've been sentenced to life at Lilith Fair". Will Hermes from Rolling Stone gave a rating of 2.5 stars (out of 5) and a mixed review, analysing that "Bareilles veers between fellow pianists Alicia Keys and Regina Spektor, avoiding either's extremes". Another mixed review, came from Enio Chiola from PopMatters, who claimed that "Although Kaleidoscope Heart was probably intended to prove Bareilles' staying power, it only confirms suspicions that in some years, she'll be as remembered as Michelle Branch, or Tracy Bonham, still making music, but without any of the mass appeal they once enjoyed".

== Commercial performance ==
Kaleidoscope Heart debuted at number one on the US Billboard 200 chart, selling 90,000 copies in its first week, according to Nielsen SoundScan. This became Bareilles first US number one debut and her second US top ten album. As of July 2013, it had sold over 441,000 copies in the US. On December 6, 2019, the album was certified gold by the Recording Industry Association of America (RIAA) for combined sales and album-equivalent units of over 500,000 units in the United States.

== Track listing ==
All tracks are written by Bareilles, except where noted.

| No. | Title | Writer(s) | Length |
|---|---|---|---|
| 1. | "Kaleidoscope Heart" | | 1:02 |
| 2. | "Uncharted" | | 3:35 |
| 3. | "Gonna Get Over You" | Bareilles, Sam Farrar | 4:16 |
| 4. | "Hold My Heart" | | 4:33 |
| 5. | "King of Anything" | | 3:27 |
| 6. | "Say You're Sorry" | | 3:41 |
| 7. | "The Light" | | 4:23 |
| 8. | "Basket Case" | | 4:12 |
| 9. | "Let the Rain" | | 3:40 |
| 10. | "Machine Gun" | | 4:08 |
| 11. | "Not Alone" | | 3:42 |
| 12. | "Breathe Again" | | 4:58 |
| 13. | "Bluebird" | | 4:04 |
| Total length: | | | 49:36 |

iTunes pre-order bonus track
| No. | Title | Writer(s) | Length |
|---|---|---|---|
| 14. | "Carolina" | Bareilles, Josh Day, Javier Dunn, Daniel Rhine | 3:38 |

UK and Japan bonus tracks
| No. | Title | Writer(s) | Length |
|---|---|---|---|
| 14. | "Carolina" | Bareilles, Day, Dunn, Rhine | 3:38 |
| 15. | "Love Song" (live from Ocean Studios) | | 4:28 |

Kaleidoscope EP (also sold as bonus tracks on the Target exclusive version of the album)
| No. | Title | Length |
|---|---|---|
| 1. | "Gonna Get Over You" (demo) | 3:43 |
| 2. | "Send Me the Moon" | 4:58 |
| 3. | "King of Anything" (strings version) | 3:37 |
| Total length: | | 12:16 |

== Personnel ==
=== Musicians ===
- Sara Bareilles – piano, acoustic guitar, synthesizer, organ, harmonica, vocals
- Neal Avron – organ, strings, synthesizer
- Charlie Bisharat – violin
- Matt Chamberlain – drums, percussion
- Andrew Duckles – viola
- Chuck Findley – trumpet
- Matt Funes – viola
- Paula Hochhalter – cello
- Victor Indrizzo – drums, percussion
- Natalie Leggett – violin
- David Levita – acoustic and electric guitar
- Justin Meldal-Johnsen – bass guitar
- Blake Mills – acoustic and electric guitar
- Alyssa Park – violin
- Tom Scott – saxophone
- David Stone – double bass
- Josefina Vergara – violin

=== Production ===
- Neal Avron – producer, mixing, engineer, string arrangements, programming
- Erich Talaba – engineer, Pro Tools
- Graham Hope, Chris Owens – assistant engineer
- Ted Jensen – mastering
- Nicolas Fournier – mixing assistant
- Suzie Katayama – string arrangements
- Tommy Walter – programming
- Heidi Ross – design, photography
- Mike Flynn – A&R

== Charts ==
=== Weekly charts ===
Weekly chart performance for Kaleidoscope Heart
| Chart (2010) | Peak position |
|---|---|
| Canadian Albums (Billboard) | 13 |
| Swiss Albums (Schweizer Hitparade) | 97 |
| US Billboard 200 | 1 |
| US Indie Store Album Sales (Billboard) | 10 |

=== Year-end charts ===
2010 year-end chart performance for Kaleidoscope Heart
| Chart (2010) | Position |
|---|---|
| US Billboard 200 | 175 |

== Certifications ==
| Region | Certification | Certified units/sales |
|---|---|---|
| United States (RIAA) | Gold | 500,000^{‡} |
^{‡} Sales+streaming figures based on certification alone.
