= King of Anything =

Single by Sara Bareilles

from the album Kaleidoscope Heart
- Released: May 10, 2010
- Recorded: 2009–2010
- Studio: The Village Recorder (Los Angeles, CA)
- Genre: Pop rock
- Length: 3:27
- Label: Epic
- Songwriter: Sara Bareilles
- Producer: Neal Avron

Sara Bareilles singles chronology
"Gravity" (2009)	"King of Anything" (2010)	"Uncharted" (2011)

"King of Anything" is a song written and recorded by American singer Sara Bareilles. The song was produced by Neal Avron, and served as the first single from her third studio album, Kaleidoscope Heart (2010). The song was nominated at the 53rd Grammy Awards for Best Female Pop Vocal Performance, though it ultimately lost to Lady Gaga's "Bad Romance". The song was her second time being nominated for the category and her third nomination overall.

== Background ==
"'King of Anything' is sort of a 'f[uck] you' song," Bareilles said. "I've had more unsolicited advice on my life than I care to mention, and this was how I dealt with it. It felt empowering to turn that frustration into music, especially a song that doesn't even sound angry. That's sort of what 'Love Song' was as well. Apparently, I don't get over things very quickly."

== Release ==
"King of Anything" was released to radio in the US on May 10, 2010. It was released for sale on June 22, 2010. It was released in Europe in the spring of 2011.

== Music video ==
The music video was released on June 29, 2010. It was filmed in Vancouver, Canada by director Laurent Briet and features Sara singing in a number of different places accompanied by a brass band; in a restaurant, on a bus, in a music store, standing in front of a mural and finally in a garden of flowers. The scenes of the video are all fragmented throughout. A behind-the-scenes of the video was released on Bareilles' official Facebook page. Bareilles states in the behind-the-scenes video that she had input in the making of the music video, writing a treatment for it as soon as she had written the song.

== Chart performance ==
In the week dated July 5, 2010, it debuted at number 59 on the Billboard Hot 100, making it her second entry and also her highest debut on the chart so far. It peaked at number 32, becoming her second top 40 single in the United States, after "Love Song". It peaked the highest on the Dutch Top 40, where it peaked at number 21.

"King of Anything" was certified Platinum in the United States by the RIAA. It has sold over 1.4 million copies in the US as of November 2013.

=== Weekly charts ===
Chart (2010–2011)	Peak position
Canada Hot 100 (Billboard)	94
Netherlands (Dutch Top 40)	21
Netherlands (Single Top 100)	80
New Zealand (Recorded Music NZ)	38
US Billboard Hot 100	32
US Adult Alternative Airplay (Billboard)	4
US Adult Contemporary (Billboard)	6
US Adult Pop Airplay (Billboard)	4
US Hot Rock & Alternative Songs (Billboard)	48
US Pop Airplay (Billboard)	19

=== Year-end charts ===
Chart (2010)	Position
US Billboard Hot 100	95
US Adult Contemporary (Billboard)	27
US Adult Pop Songs (Billboard)	11

Chart (2011)	Position
US Adult Contemporary (Billboard)	15

== Certifications ==
Region	Certification	Certified units/sales
United States (RIAA)	Platinum	1,468,000

== Release history ==
Release dates and formats for "King of Anything"
Region	Date	Format	Label(s)	Ref.
United States	August 17, 2010	Mainstream airplay	Epic	
