= List of Billboard Hot 100 top-ten singles in 2008 =

This is a list of singles that have peaked in the top 10 of the Billboard Hot 100 during 2008.

== Top-ten singles ==
Key

- ↑ – indicates single's top 10 entry was also its Hot 100 debut
- † – indicates Best performing song of the year
- (#) – 2008 year-end top 10 single position and rank

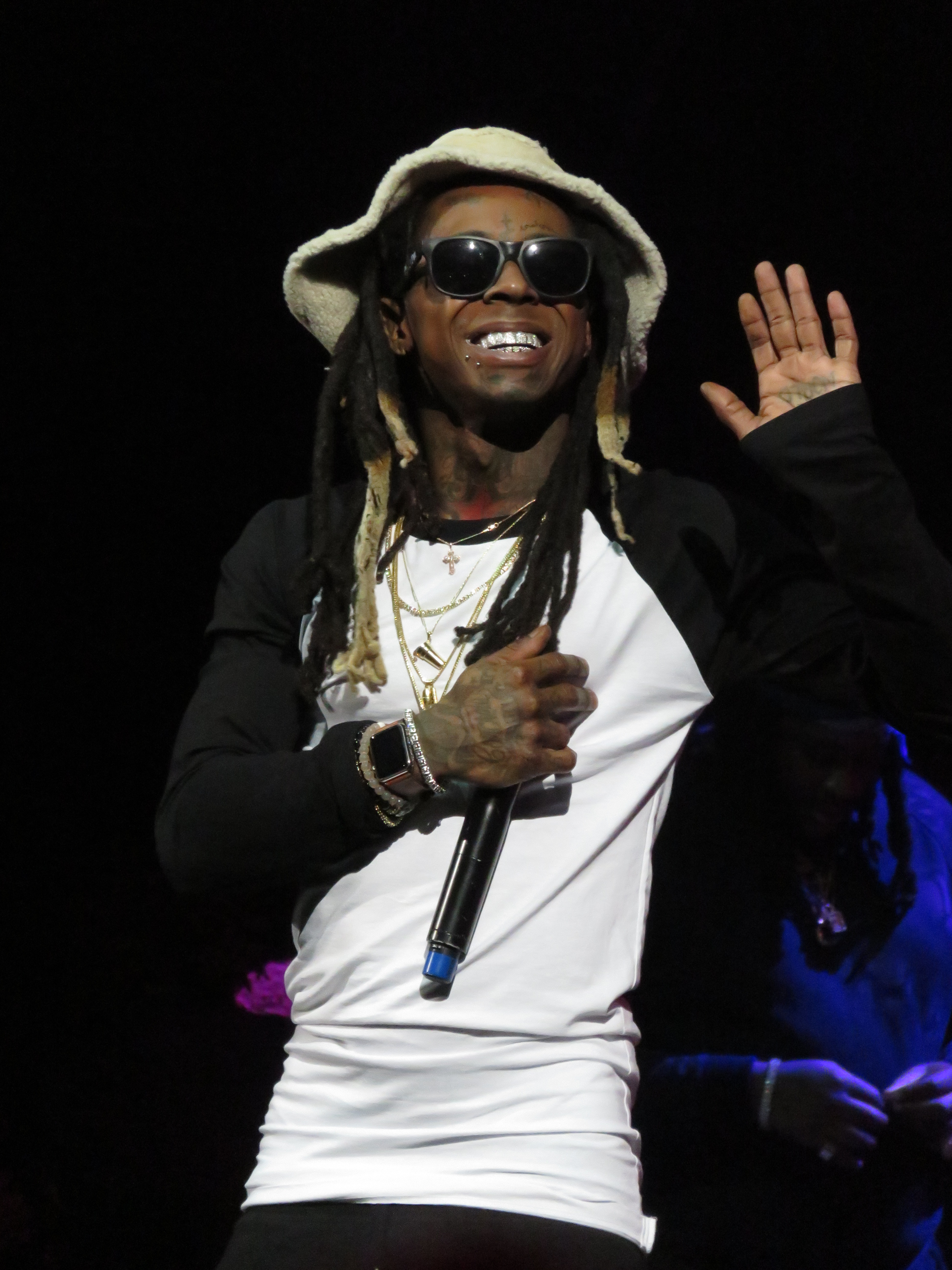
Lil Wayne scored six top ten hits during the year with "Lollipop", "A Milli", "Swagga Like Us", "Can't Believe It", "Got Money", and "Let It Rock", the most among all other artists.

List of Billboard Hot 100 top ten singles which peaked in 2008
Top ten entry date	Single	Artist(s)	Peak	Peak date	Weeks in top ten
Singles from 2007
November 24	"Low" † (#1)	Flo Rida featuring T-Pain	1	January 5	23
November 24	"Paralyzer"	Finger Eleven	6	January 5	9
Singles from 2008
January 5	"Love Song" (#7)	Sara Bareilles	4	March 8	19
January 26	"Take You There"	Sean Kingston	7	February 9	7
January 26	"With You" (#9)	Chris Brown	2	February 16	16
February 2	"Don't Stop the Music"	Rihanna	3	February 16	10
February 9	"Sexual Eruption"	Snoop Dogg	7	March 1	6
February 16	"New Soul" ↑	Yael Naïm	7	February 23	2
February 23	"Sorry"	Buckcherry	9	March 1	3
March 1	"Independent"	Webbie featuring Lil Boosie and Lil Phat	9	March 8	4
March 15	"Love in This Club" (#8)	Usher featuring Young Jeezy	1	March 15	16
March 15	"No Air" (#6)	Jordin Sparks and Chris Brown	3	April 26	16
March 22	"Sexy Can I"	Ray J featuring Yung Berg	3	April 5	14
March 22	"Superstar"	Lupe Fiasco featuring Matthew Santos	10	March 22	2
March 29	"Bleeding Love" (#2)	Leona Lewis	1	April 5	20
April 5	"Lollipop" (#4)	Lil Wayne featuring Static Major	1	May 3	19
April 5	"Shawty Get Loose"	Lil Mama featuring Chris Brown and T-Pain	10	April 5	1
April 12	"4 Minutes"	Madonna featuring Justin Timberlake and Timbaland	3	April 12	11
April 12	"Touch My Body"	Mariah Carey	1	April 12	8
May 3	"See You Again"	Miley Cyrus	10	May 3	1
May 10	"Forever" (#10) ↑	Chris Brown	2	August 16	15
May 17	"Leavin'"	Jesse McCartney	10	May 17	3
May 17	"Pocketful of Sunshine"	Natasha Bedingfield	5	July 5	11
May 24	"Damaged"	Danity Kane	10	May 24	2
May 24	"Take a Bow"	Rihanna	1	May 24	16
June 7	"The Time of My Life" ↑	David Cook	3	June 7	2
June 7	"Viva la Vida"	Coldplay	1	June 28	16
June 14	"I Kissed a Girl"	Katy Perry	1	July 5	14
June 28	"Shake It"	Metro Station	10	June 28	1
July 5	"7 Things"	Miley Cyrus	9	July 26	3
July 5	"Bust It Baby (Part 2)"	Plies featuring Ne-Yo	7	July 12	4
July 5	"When I Grow Up"	The Pussycat Dolls	9	July 5	2
July 12	"Burnin' Up" ↑	Jonas Brothers featuring Big Rob	5	July 12	3
July 12	"This Is Me"	Demi Lovato and Joe Jonas	9	July 12	1
July 26	"A Milli"	Lil Wayne	6	August 9	5
August 2	"Dangerous"	Kardinal Offishall featuring Akon	5	September 6	8
August 9	"Disturbia"	Rihanna	1	August 23	14
August 16	"Tonight" ↑	Jonas Brothers	8	August 16	1
August 16	"Closer"	Ne-Yo	7	September 27	9
August 23	"Paper Planes"	M.I.A.	4	September 27	10
August 30	"Crush" ↑	David Archuleta	2	August 30	1
August 30	"Change" ↑	Taylor Swift	10	August 30	1
September 6	"So What" ↑	Pink	1	September 27	15
September 6	"Whatever You Like"	T.I.	1	September 6	19
September 13	"I'm Yours"	Jason Mraz	6	September 20	13
September 20	"In the Ayer"	Flo Rida featuring will.i.am	9	September 20	1
September 27	"Swagga Like Us" ↑	Jay-Z and T.I. featuring Kanye West and Lil Wayne	5	September 27	1
September 27	"American Boy"	Estelle featuring Kanye West	9	September 27	3
September 27	"Can't Believe It"	T-Pain featuring Lil Wayne	7	October 11	6
September 27	"Got Money"	Lil Wayne featuring T-Pain	10	September 27	1
October 4	"Love Lockdown" ↑	Kanye West	3	October 4	9
October 4	"Hot n Cold"	Katy Perry	3	November 22	18
October 18	"Keeps Gettin' Better" ↑	Christina Aguilera	7	October 18	1
October 18	"Gotta Be Somebody" ↑	Nickelback	10	October 18	1
October 18	"Let It Rock"	Kevin Rudolf featuring Lil Wayne	5	October 18	10
October 18	"Live Your Life"	T.I. featuring Rihanna	1	October 18	18
October 25	"Miss Independent"	Ne-Yo	7	December 13	7
October 25	"Womanizer"	Britney Spears	1	October 25	13
November 1	"Fearless" ↑	Taylor Swift	9	November 1	1
November 8	"If I Were a Boy"	Beyoncé	3	November 8	10
November 15	"Right Now (Na Na Na)"	Akon	8	November 29	4
December 6	"Single Ladies (Put a Ring on It)"	Beyoncé	1	December 13	13
December 20	"Circus" ↑	Britney Spears	3	December 20	5

=== 2007 peaks ===
List of Billboard Hot 100 top ten singles in 2008 which peaked in 2007
Top ten entry date	Single	Artist(s)	Peak	Peak date	Weeks in top ten
September 1	"Crank That (Soulja Boy)"	Soulja Boy Tell 'Em	1	September 15	18
October 6	"Bubbly"	Colbie Caillat	5	October 27	17
October 13	"Apologize" (#5)	Timbaland featuring OneRepublic	2	November 10	25
October 20	"No One" (#3)	Alicia Keys	1	December 1	22
November 3	"Kiss Kiss"	Chris Brown featuring T-Pain	1	November 10	15
November 3	"Hate That I Love You"	Rihanna featuring Ne-Yo	7	December 22	8
December 1	"Clumsy"	Fergie	5	December 22	12
December 22	"Tattoo"	Jordin Sparks	8	December 29	6

=== 2009 peaks ===
List of Billboard Hot 100 top ten singles in 2008 which peaked in 2009
Top ten entry date	Single	Artist(s)	Peak	Peak date	Weeks in top ten
October 4	"Love Story"	Taylor Swift	4	January 17	13
November 22	"Heartless" ↑	Kanye West	2	February 21	16
December 6	"Just Dance"	Lady Gaga featuring Colby O'Donis	1	January 17	19

== Artists with most top-ten songs ==
List of artists by total songs peaking in the top-ten
Artist	Numbers of songs
Chris Brown	5
Lil Wayne	5
Rihanna	5
T-Pain	5
Kanye West	4
Ne-Yo	4
T.I.	3
Taylor Swift	3
Akon	2
Beyoncé	2
Britney Spears	2
Flo Rida	2
Jonas Brothers	2
Jordin Sparks	2
Katy Perry	2
Miley Cyrus	2
Timbaland	2

== See also ==
- 2008 in music
- List of Billboard Hot 100 number ones of 2008
- Billboard Year-End Hot 100 singles of 2008
