= Billboard Year-End Hot 100 singles of 2008 =

Ranking of recorded music

Billboard publishes annual lists of songs based on chart performance over the course of a year based on Nielsen Broadcast Data Systems and SoundScan information. This is a list of the magazine's Top Hot 100 songs of 2008.

The #1 song on the list was "Low" by Flo Rida and T-Pain, after having released the song in 2007 and spent 10 weeks at number-one. The song that came in at number two was "Bleeding Love" by Leona Lewis and at #3 was Alicia Keys' song "No One", after spending 5 weeks at #1 in December 2007.

T-Pain achieved a rare distinction of appearing on both the number-one and number one-hundred positions on a Billboard Hot 100 Year-End list.

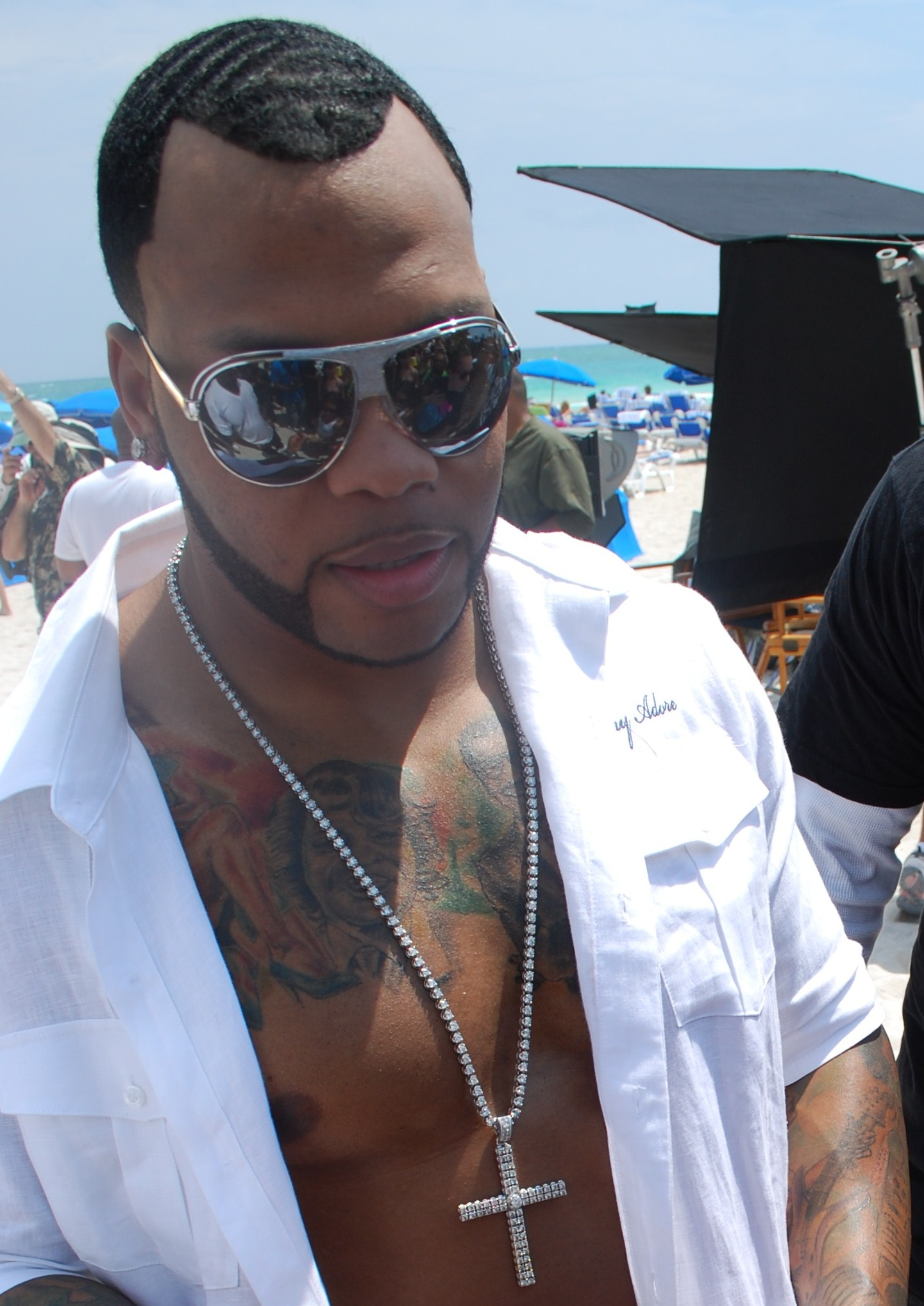
Flo Rida's song "Low" with T-Pain topped the chart. He also had another song on the chart, In the Ayer, a collaboration with will.i.am at 59.

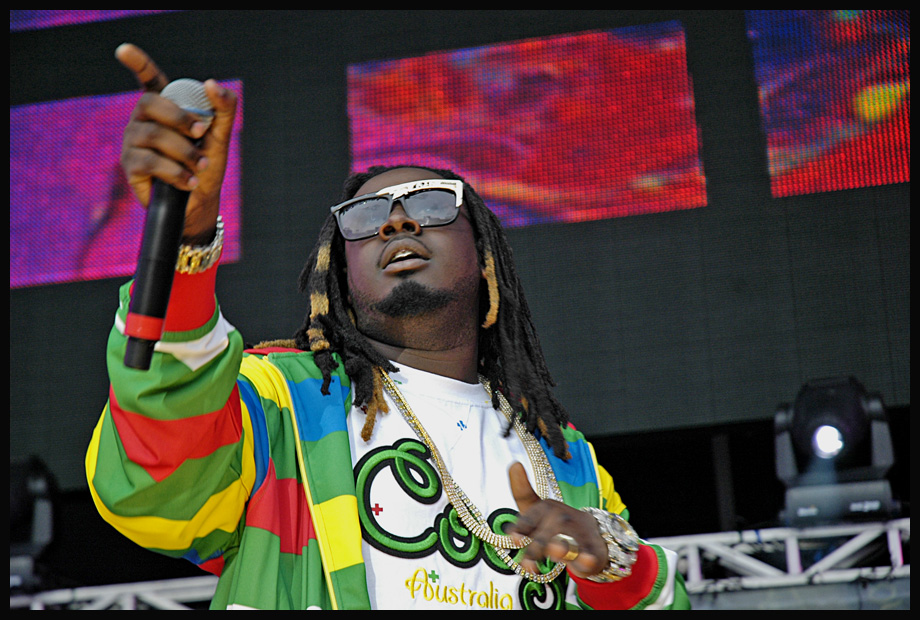
T-Pain lent his vocals to eight songs on the chart, including the best-performing song of the year, "Low," a collaboration with Flo Rida.

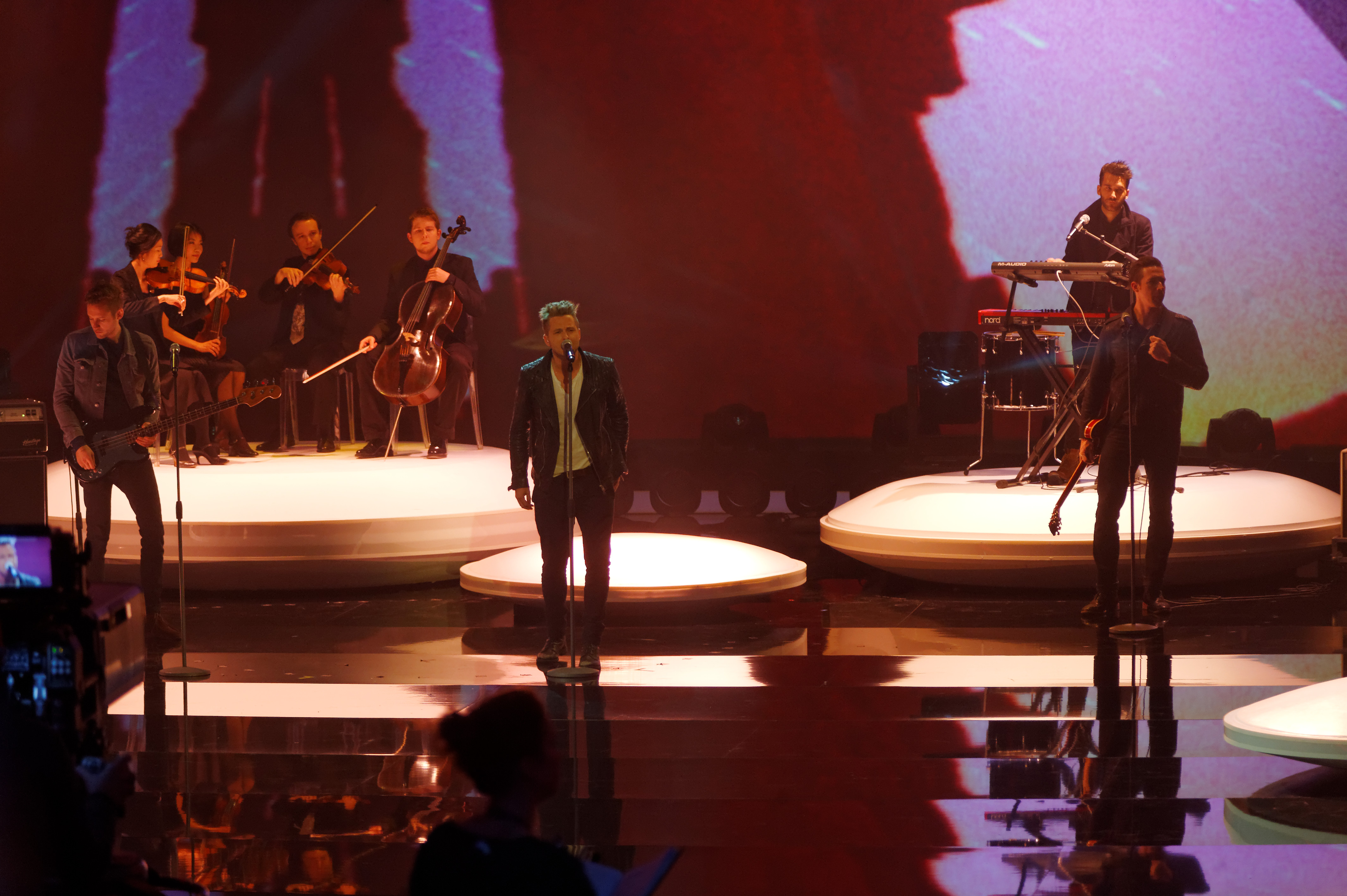
OneRepublic is the highest-charting band on the list with their single "Apologize" (number 5). They also had their single, "Stop and Stare" at number 33.

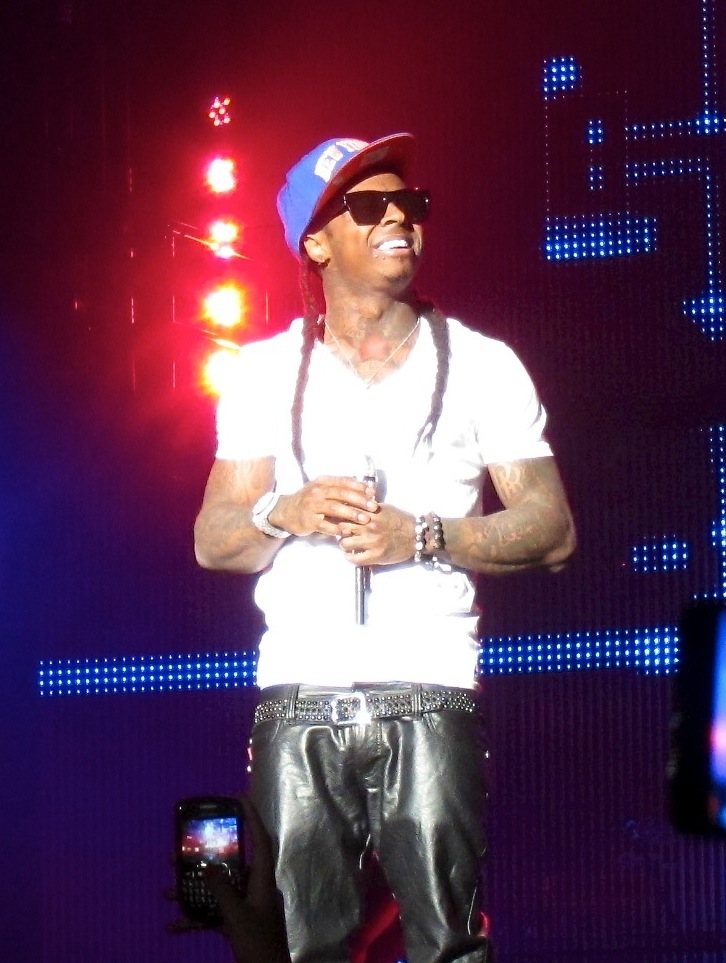
Rapper Lil Wayne was in eight songs on the chart. "Lollipop" was his most successful song at number 4.

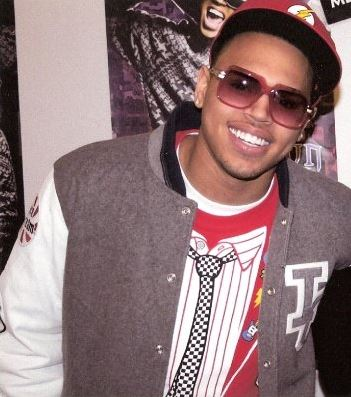
R&B singer Chris Brown had five songs on the chart, four of which are in the top 20. His best-performing song is "No Air", a duet with Jordin Sparks, at number six.

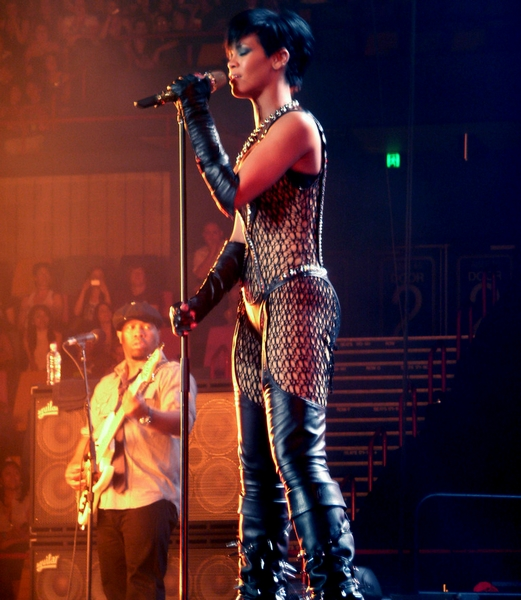
Barbadian singer Rihanna had five songs on the chart. Her best-performing song was "Take a Bow" at number 12.

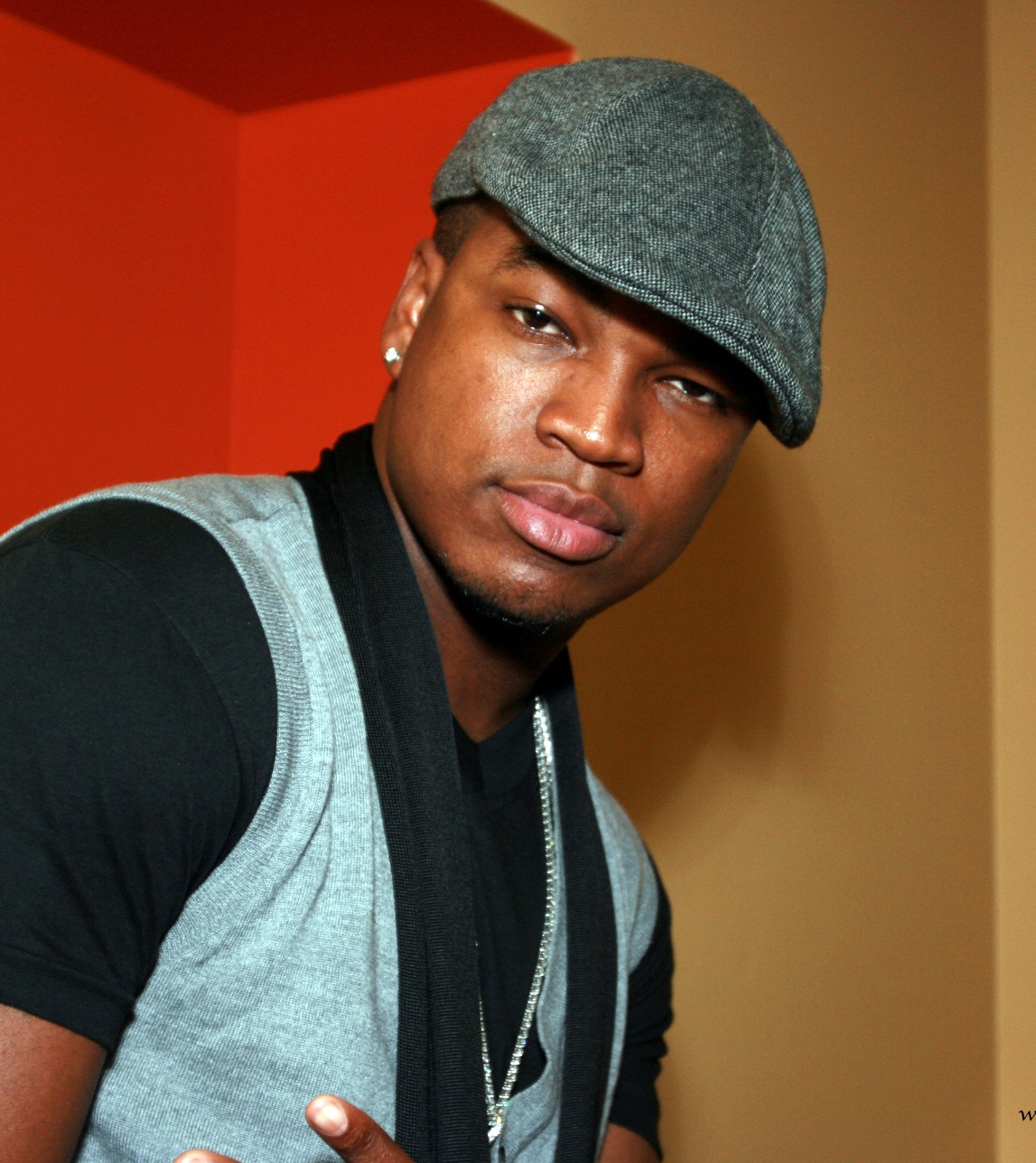
R&B singer Ne-Yo had four songs on the chart, two of which are his own: "Closer" at number 20 and "Miss Independent" at 57.

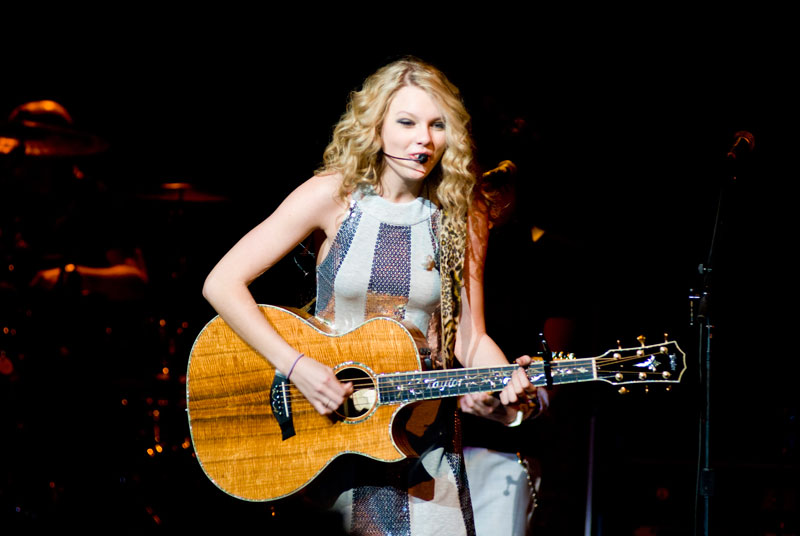
Taylor Swift was the most successful country artist, with three songs on the chart: "Our Song" at 41, "Teardrops on My Guitar" at 48, and "Love Story" at 81.

No.	Title	Artist(s)
1	"Low"	Flo Rida featuring T-Pain
2	"Bleeding Love"	Leona Lewis
3	"No One"	Alicia Keys
4	"Lollipop"	Lil Wayne featuring Static Major
5	"Apologize"	OneRepublic
6	"No Air"	Jordin Sparks and Chris Brown
7	"Love Song"	Sara Bareilles
8	"Love in This Club"	Usher featuring Young Jeezy
9	"With You"	Chris Brown
10	"Forever"	Chris Brown
11	"Sexy Can I"	Ray J featuring Yung Berg
12	"Take a Bow"	Rihanna
13	"Viva la Vida"	Coldplay
14	"I Kissed a Girl"	Katy Perry
15	"Whatever You Like"	T.I.
16	"Disturbia"	Rihanna
17	"Don't Stop the Music"	Rihanna
18	"Pocketful of Sunshine"	Natasha Bedingfield
19	"Kiss Kiss"	Chris Brown featuring T-Pain
20	"Closer"	Ne-Yo
21	"Bubbly"	Colbie Caillat
22	"Touch My Body"	Mariah Carey
23	"4 Minutes"	Madonna featuring Justin Timberlake and Timbaland
24	"So What"	Pink
25	"Paralyzer"	Finger Eleven
26	"Clumsy"	Fergie
27	"I'm Yours"	Jason Mraz
28	"Leavin'"	Jesse McCartney
29	"Dangerous"	Kardinal Offishall featuring Akon
30	"Tattoo"	Jordin Sparks
31	"See You Again"	Miley Cyrus
32	"Shake It"	Metro Station
33	"Stop and Stare"	OneRepublic
34	"Take You There"	Sean Kingston
35	"Paper Planes"	M.I.A.
36	"Hot n Cold"	Katy Perry
37	"Live Your Life"	T.I. featuring Rihanna
38	"Bust It Baby (Part 2)"	Plies featuring Ne-Yo
39	"American Boy"	Estelle featuring Kanye West
40	"Got Money"	Lil Wayne featuring T-Pain
41	"Our Song"	Taylor Swift
42	"Damaged"	Danity Kane
43	"A Milli"	Lil Wayne
44	"Sorry"	Buckcherry
45	"Independent"	Webbie featuring Lil Boosie and Lil Phat
46	"Can't Believe It"	T-Pain featuring Lil Wayne
47	"Like You'll Never See Me Again"	Alicia Keys
48	"Teardrops on My Guitar"	Taylor Swift
49	"When I Grow Up"	Pussycat Dolls
50	"Sexual Eruption"	Snoop Dogg
51	"What You Got"	Colby O'Donis featuring Akon
52	"It's Not My Time"	3 Doors Down
53	"Better in Time"	Leona Lewis
54	"Crank That (Soulja Boy)"	Soulja Boy Tell 'Em
55	"Shadow of the Day"	Linkin Park
56	"Sweetest Girl (Dollar Bill)"	Wyclef Jean featuring Akon, Lil Wayne and Niia
57	"Miss Independent"	Ne-Yo
58	"Fall for You"	Secondhand Serenade
59	"In the Ayer"	Flo Rida featuring will.i.am
60	"Say"	John Mayer
61	"One Step at a Time"	Jordin Sparks
62	"Hate That I Love You"	Rihanna featuring Ne-Yo
63	"Superstar"	Lupe Fiasco featuring Matthew Santos
64	"Suffocate"	J. Holiday
65	"Let It Rock"	Kevin Rudolf featuring Lil Wayne
66	"Get Like Me"	David Banner featuring Chris Brown and Yung Joc
67	"Realize"	Colbie Caillat
68	"Put On"	Young Jeezy featuring Kanye West
69	"The Time of My Life"	David Cook
70	"Lolli Lolli (Pop That Body)"	Three 6 Mafia
71	"Cyclone"	Baby Bash featuring T-Pain
72	"Love Like This"	Natasha Bedingfield featuring Sean Kingston
73	"Burnin' Up"	Jonas Brothers
74	"Love Lockdown"	Kanye West
75	"I Luv Your Girl"	The-Dream
76	"Crush"	David Archuleta
77	"Hypnotized"	Plies featuring Akon
78	"Big Girls Don't Cry"	Fergie
79	"Good Life"	Kanye West featuring T-Pain
80	"Womanizer"	Britney Spears
81	"Love Story"	Taylor Swift
82	"Just Fine"	Mary J. Blige
83	"Piece of Me"	Britney Spears
84	"The Boss"	Rick Ross featuring T-Pain
85	"All Summer Long"	Kid Rock
86	"Can't Help but Wait"	Trey Songz
87	"In Love with a Girl"	Gavin DeGraw
88	"My Life"	The Game featuring Lil Wayne
89	"I Remember"	Keyshia Cole
90	"Flashing Lights"	Kanye West featuring Dwele
91	"Mrs. Officer"	Lil Wayne featuring Bobby Valentino and Kidd Kidd
92	"7 Things"	Miley Cyrus
93	"You're Gonna Miss This"	Trace Adkins
94	"Love Remains the Same"	Gavin Rossdale
95	"Feels Like Tonight"	Daughtry
96	"The Way I Are"	Timbaland featuring Keri Hilson
97	"Addicted"	Saving Abel
98	"Into the Night"	Santana featuring Chad Kroeger
99	"Heaven Sent"	Keyshia Cole
100	"She Got It"	2 Pistols featuring T-Pain and Tay Dizm

== See also ==
- 2008 in music
- Billboard Year-End Hot R&B/Hip-Hop Songs of 2008
- Billboard Year-End Hot Rap Songs of 2008
- List of Billboard Hot 100 number-one singles of 2008
- List of Billboard Hot 100 top-ten singles in 2008
