= List of Canadian Hot 100 number-one singles of 2008 =

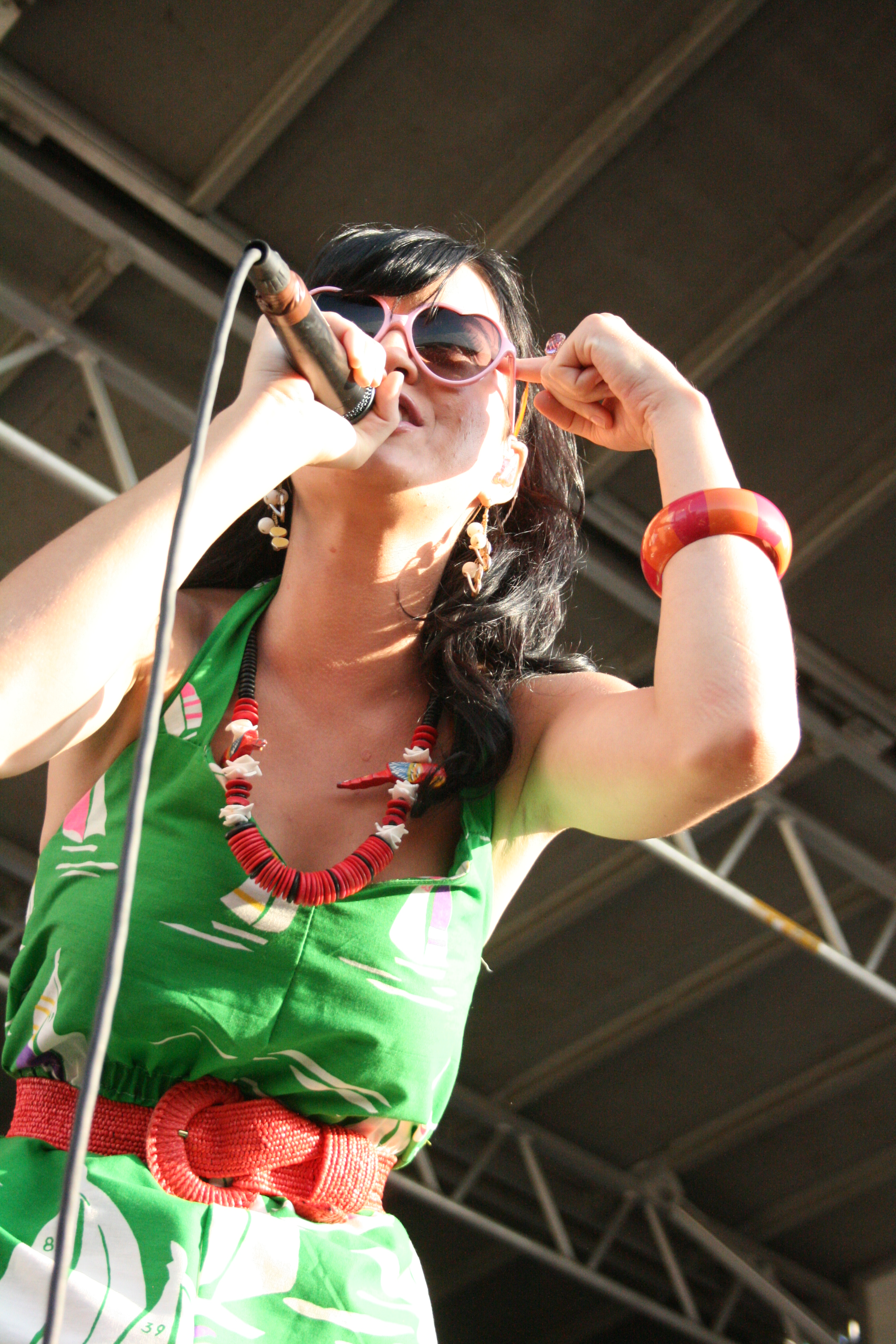
Katy Perry (pictured)'s "I Kissed a Girl" topped the chart for nine consecutive weeks, tying Madonna's "4 Minutes" for the joint-longest-running number-one single of the year.

The Canadian Hot 100 is a chart that ranks the best-performing singles of Canada. Published by Billboard magazine, its data are similar to Billboard's U.S.-based Hot 100 in that it compiles Nielsen SoundScan based collectively on each single's weekly physical and digital sales, as well as airplay. Canada's airplay chart is compiled with information collected from monitoring more than 100 stations that represent rock, country, adult contemporary and contemporary hit radio genres. The online version of the chart features the Canadian flag next to tracks that qualify as Canadian content.

In 2008, 11 singles topped the chart. Although 12 singles claimed the top spot in 52 issues of the magazine, Timbaland's "Apologize" featuring OneRepublic began its peak position in late 2007, and is thus excluded. Katy Perry and Lady Gaga each earned two number-one singles as a lead artist. Two number-one singles tied for the longest-running chart-topping single of 2008, for nine weeks: Madonna's "4 Minutes" featuring Justin Timberlake and Katy Perry's "I Kissed a Girl", although the former had a non-consecutive run. Other chart-topping singles from 2008 include Flo Rida's "Low" featuring T-Pain, which stayed at number one for eight straight weeks. Rihanna's "Take a Bow" is noted for its jump from seventieth to first place on the Canadian Hot 100, which was the largest upward movement to number one at the time.

== Chart history ==
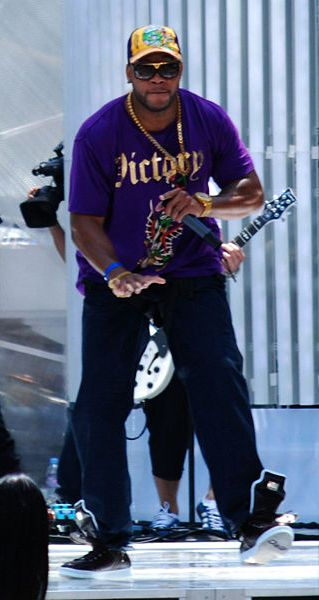
Flo Rida (pictured)'s "Low", featuring T-Pain, topped the chart for eight consecutive weeks.

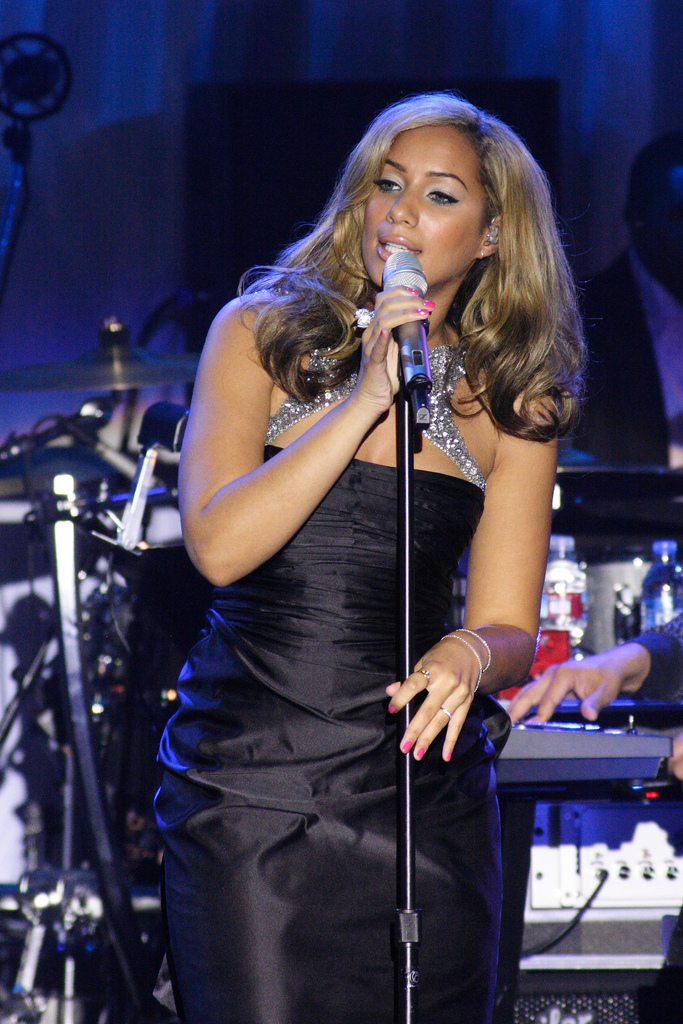
Leona Lewis (pictured) earned her first number-one single with "Bleeding Love".

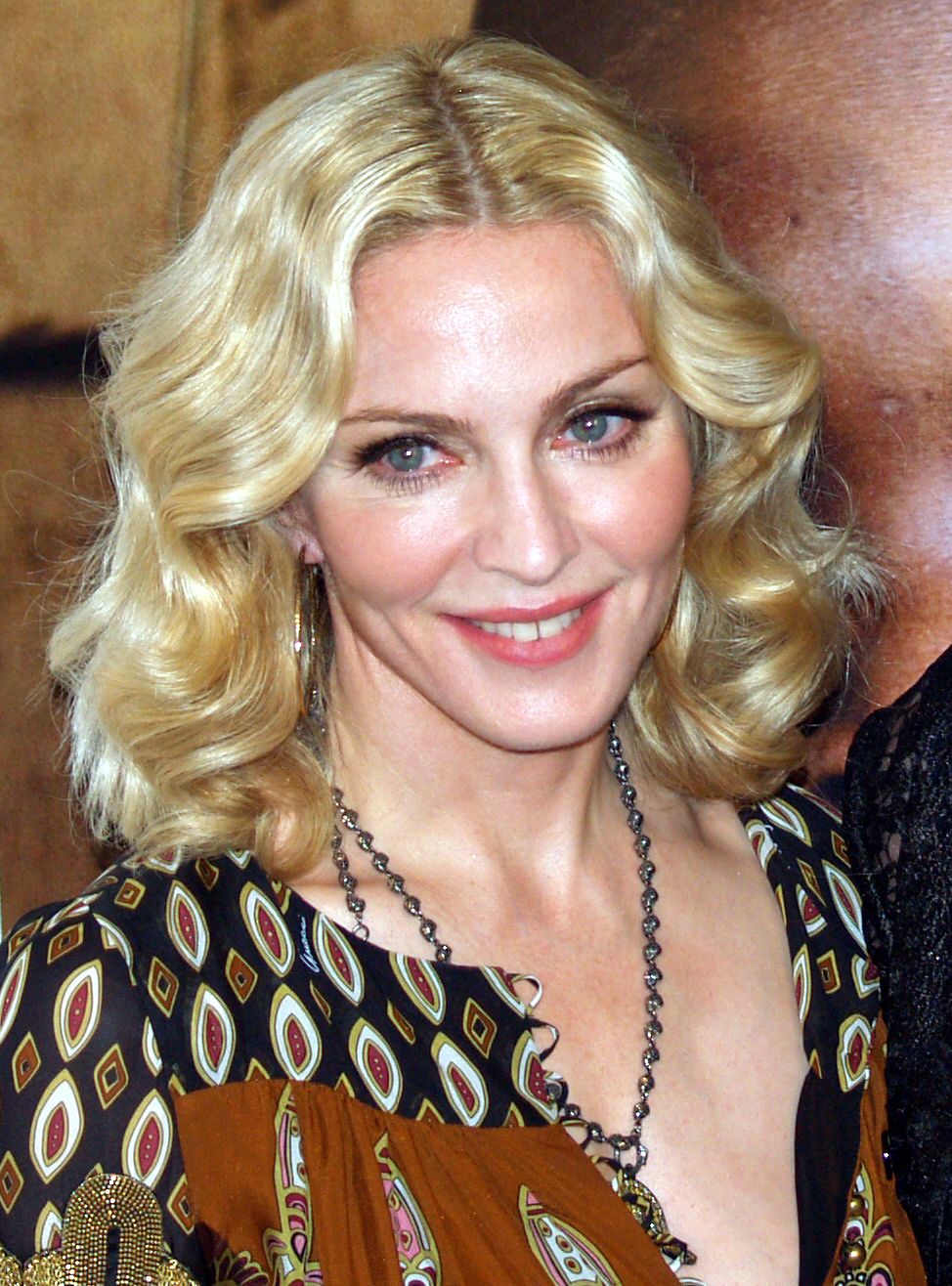
Madonna (pictured)'s "4 Minutes", featuring Justin Timberlake, topped the chart for nine weeks, becoming the joint-longest-running number-one single of the year.

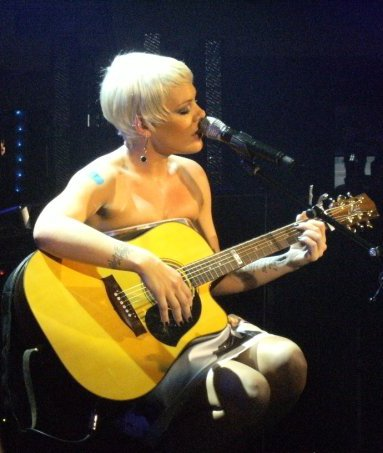
Singer Pink (pictured) gained her first Canadian number-one single with "So What" and stood atop for four consecutive weeks.

Key
†	Indicates best-performing single of 2008

No.	Issue date	Song	Artist(s)	Reference.
11	January 5	"Apologize" †	Timbaland featuring OneRepublic	
11	January 12	"Apologize" †	Timbaland featuring OneRepublic	
11	January 19	"Apologize" †	Timbaland featuring OneRepublic	
11	January 26	"Apologize" †	Timbaland featuring OneRepublic	
12	February 2	"Low"	Flo Rida featuring T-Pain	
12	February 9	"Low"	Flo Rida featuring T-Pain	
12	February 16	"Low"	Flo Rida featuring T-Pain	
12	February 23	"Low"	Flo Rida featuring T-Pain	
12	March 1	"Low"	Flo Rida featuring T-Pain	
12	March 8	"Low"	Flo Rida featuring T-Pain	
12	March 15	"Low"	Flo Rida featuring T-Pain	
12	March 22	"Low"	Flo Rida featuring T-Pain	
13	March 29	"Love Song"	Sara Bareilles	
14	April 5	"Bleeding Love"	Leona Lewis	
15	April 12	"4 Minutes"	Madonna featuring Justin Timberlake	
15	April 19	"4 Minutes"	Madonna featuring Justin Timberlake	
15	April 26	"4 Minutes"	Madonna featuring Justin Timberlake	
15	May 3	"4 Minutes"	Madonna featuring Justin Timberlake	
15	May 10	"4 Minutes"	Madonna featuring Justin Timberlake	
15	May 17	"4 Minutes"	Madonna featuring Justin Timberlake	
16	May 24	"Take a Bow"	Rihanna	
re	May 31	"4 Minutes"	Madonna featuring Justin Timberlake	
re	June 7	"4 Minutes"	Madonna featuring Justin Timberlake	
re	June 14	"4 Minutes"	Madonna featuring Justin Timberlake	
17	June 21	"I Kissed a Girl"	Katy Perry	
17	June 28	"I Kissed a Girl"	Katy Perry	
17	July 5	"I Kissed a Girl"	Katy Perry	
17	July 12	"I Kissed a Girl"	Katy Perry	
17	July 19	"I Kissed a Girl"	Katy Perry	
17	July 26	"I Kissed a Girl"	Katy Perry	
17	August 2	"I Kissed a Girl"	Katy Perry	
17	August 9	"I Kissed a Girl"	Katy Perry	
17	August 16	"I Kissed a Girl"	Katy Perry	
18	August 23	"Just Dance"	Lady Gaga featuring Colby O'Donis	
18	August 30	"Just Dance"	Lady Gaga featuring Colby O'Donis	
18	September 6	"Just Dance"	Lady Gaga featuring Colby O'Donis	
18	September 13	"Just Dance"	Lady Gaga featuring Colby O'Donis	
18	September 20	"Just Dance"	Lady Gaga featuring Colby O'Donis	
19	September 27	"So What"	Pink	
19	October 4	"So What"	Pink	
19	October 11	"So What"	Pink	
19	October 18	"So What"	Pink	
20	October 25	"Womanizer"	Britney Spears	
20	November 1	"Womanizer"	Britney Spears	
20	November 8	"Womanizer"	Britney Spears	
20	November 15	"Womanizer"	Britney Spears	
20	November 22	"Womanizer"	Britney Spears	
21	November 29	"Hot n Cold"	Katy Perry	
21	December 6	"Hot n Cold"	Katy Perry	
22	December 13	"Poker Face"	Lady Gaga	
22	December 20	"Poker Face"	Lady Gaga	
22	December 27	"Poker Face"	Lady Gaga	

== See also ==
- 2008 in music
- List of number-one singles in Canada
