= I Kissed a Girl =

2008 single by Katy Perry

Single by Katy Perry

from the album One of the Boys
- Released: April 28, 2008
- Studio: Dr. Luke's Studios; Legacy Recording Studio (New York City); Conway Recording Studios (Hollywood)
- Genre: Pop rock; electropop; bubblegum pop; club; disco
- Length: 3:00
- Label: Capitol
- Songwriters: Katy Perry; Lukasz Gottwald; Max Martin; Cathy Dennis
- Producer: Dr. Luke

Katy Perry singles chronology
"I Kissed a Girl" (2008)	"Hot n Cold" (2008)

Music video
- "I Kissed a Girl" on YouTube

"I Kissed a Girl" is the debut single by American singer Katy Perry. It was released on April 28, 2008, by Capitol Records as the lead single from her second studio album, One of the Boys (2008). Perry co-wrote the song with Max Martin, Cathy Dennis, and its producer Dr. Luke, with additional production from Benny Blanco. The track was recorded at Dr. Luke's Studios and Legacy Recordings, both based in New York City, New York, and Conway Recording Studios, based in Hollywood, Los Angeles. "I Kissed a Girl" is a pop rock, electropop, bubblegum pop, club, and disco record with elements of glam rock and new wave music. Perry stated its lyrics are "about the magical beauty of a woman". The song sparked controversy for its handling of bi-curious themes, but in retrospect has been credited with increasing LGBTQ awareness in pop music.

"I Kissed a Girl" became a massive commercial success worldwide in 2008. The song topped the Billboard Hot 100 chart for 7 consecutive weeks, becoming the 1,000th number-one song of the rock era. The single has sold 4.8 million units in the US alone. "I Kissed a Girl" is one of eight songs by Perry to sell over 4 million digital copies in the US, the others being "Hot n Cold", "California Gurls", "Teenage Dream", "Firework", "E.T.", "Roar", and "Dark Horse". Outside of the United States, "I Kissed a Girl" topped charts in 20 countries including Australia, Austria, Belgium, Canada, the Czech Republic, Denmark, Germany, Hungary, Ireland, Italy, New Zealand, Norway, Sweden, Switzerland, and the United Kingdom. It was the best-selling song of 2008 in Finland. The song has sold 11.81 million copies worldwide and received multi-platinum certifications in Australia, Canada, Denmark, the United Kingdom, and the United States.

An accompanying music video for the song was released on May 16, 2008. The video, directed by Kinga Burza, features the singer in a setting inspired by burlesque and Moulin Rouge styles. It features appearances from Perry's friends, including actress Shannon Woodward and fellow American singer Kesha. The song is recognized as the 10th best-selling single in the 21st century. "I Kissed a Girl" was performed and nominated for Best Female Pop Vocal Performance at the 51st Grammy Awards. It was also nominated for Favorite Song at the 2009 Kids' Choice Awards, and won Favorite Pop Song at the 35th People's Choice Awards. The song has been performed on all of Perry's tours (including her residency Play), and was also included in her performance at Pepsi's Super Bowl XLIX halftime show in 2015, at Glendale, Arizona, where she performed the song with fellow American artist Lenny Kravitz. The song has appeared in numerous pieces of media, including Glee, where the song had an episode named after it.

== Background ==
In 2008, Perry told BBC that the song came to her after she woke up, stating, "The chorus actually popped into my head when I woke up. It was one of those moments where you hear artists talking about songs they get in dreams or in the middle of the night." She left the idea undeveloped for a year and half, eventually completing the song with Dr. Luke during the final two days of recording her album One of the Boys, explaining, "We just said, 'we're gonna finish it—it's so catchy because it won't get out of our heads.'"

Perry's then-boyfriend, Gym Class Heroes frontman Travie McCoy, recalled that she initially had doubts about the song: "As soon as Katy played 'I Kissed A Girl' to me, I said: 'Baby, this is a smash … but she wasn't so sure. She was like: 'Do you really think so?' I proved it to her. 'When Gym Class Heroes went on tour earlier this year we put together a playlist of songs to play before we went on stage. I put 'I Kissed A Girl' on there without Katy knowing, and as soon as it blasted out the kids went absolutely mad. They didn't even know who Katy Perry was then. Katy turned up to one gig while we were playing it and was like: 'What are you doing?' She was happy with the reaction though." He later told Spin that when he pointed out that another song titled "I Kissed a Girl" already existed, Perry replied that no one remembered it.

Capitol A&R Chris Anokute told HitQuarters that the song and its controversial theme met with strong resistance at the label. "People said, 'This is never going to get played on the radio. How do we sell this? How's this going to be played in the Bible Belt?'" Anokute said that they needed the support of one of the label's radio promoters to convince people to believe in the record. Dennis Reese, Capitol's senior vice president of promotions, saw the vision and helped push the single on national radio. The first station to pick it up and take a chance was 107.5 The River in Nashville. Rich Davis, then PD, was played the song by Joe Rainey of Capitol Records outside his favorite sushi spot in Nashville and immediately put it on the air. After playing it for three days, they were inundated with enthusiastic calls.

Singer Macy Gray later claimed in an 2015 interview with the German online web show MalcolmMusic that "I Kissed a Girl" was initially offered to her before Perry ended up releasing the song.

== Composition ==
"I Kissed a Girl"
An 18-second audio sample of Perry singing the refrain of "I Kissed a Girl". Sal Cinquemani describes it as an "infectious, bi-curious hook" with "throbbing beat[s]".

"I Kissed a Girl" has a length of three minutes. The song is a new wave-influenced pop rock, electropop, bubblegum pop, club, and disco, track which runs through a throbbing glam rock beat and an organic instrumental thump, according to About.com's Bill Lamb. It features instrumentation provided by drums, guitars, and bass, courtesy of Dr. Luke. The song was produced by Dr. Luke, which was coordinated by Gary 'G' Silver and aided by American producer and songwriter Benny Blanco. There were a number of personnel who engineered the track for the album, including Emily Wright, Sam Holland, Nick Banns, Aniela Gottwald, Mike Caffrey, and Tina Kennedy. Kitty Purry assisted in the engineering while Tim Roberts assisted in the engineering for mix, which was done by John Hanes. The song was mixed by Serban Ghenea at his studio MixStar Studios in Virginia Beach, Virginia. Cathy Dennis was on background vocals while Dr. Luke and Benny Blanco were featured on drums and programming. Steven Wolf provided the live drums on the song while Mike Caffrey recorded and produced the drums at Monster Island in New York City.

The song is written in the key of A minor in 12/8 time with a tempo of 130 beats per minute. It follows a chord progression of Am-[Bdim-C]-Dm7-[F5-Em] in the verses, Am-C-Dm-[F-Em] in the choruses (except for the Dm chord being major in the third segment), and F-Em-Am-G in the bridge, which ends with an extra-Dm chord. Perry's vocals span from A_{3} to E_{5}.

In an interview for The New Gay, Perry defended the lyrics, saying, "when we're young, we're very touchy-feely. We have slumber party sing-a-longs, we make up dance routines in our pajamas. We're a lot more intimate in a friendship than guys can be. It's not perverse but just sweet..." She explained to The Guardian: "The fact of the matter is that girls, a lot of the time, smell much better than boys. We smell like vanilla. We smell like watermelon. We smell like strawberries. So, duh! One day I was with my boyfriend and I opened up a magazine and realized, 'You know what, honey, I would probably make out with Angelina Jolie if she wanted to.'" She made a similar remark about Scarlett Johansson in an interview with Steppin' Out: "I was with my boyfriend at the time, and I said to him, 'I'm not going to lie: If Scarlett Johansson walked into the room and wanted to make out with me, I would make out with her. I hope you're okay with that?'" Perry also said the lyrics were inspired by her friendship with a girl as a teenager, recalling that "I did kiss her. I was totally obsessed with her. She was beautiful — porcelain skin, perfect lips." Although Perry did not explicitly identify the person, Miley Cyrus has claimed it was about her.

== Critical reception ==
Blogcritics magazine called it "an instantly catchy number." About.com said, "fueled by an instrumental wallop provided courtesy of producer Dr. Luke, 'I Kissed a Girl' is the perfect breakthrough." However, Rolling Stone magazine, while giving her album 2/5 stars, described the song as a "new wave-y club single", saying the supposedly rebellious "attention-grabbing" lyrics are "a vanilla recounting of her chick-on-chick exploits" and that this "acting out" is "just to get a dude's attention." AllMusic praises "the stomping Gary Glitter beat" before criticizing the producers for turning it "into a leaden stumble and burying Perry's voice underneath Pro Tools overdubs so it all winds up as a faceless wash of sound designed to be placed in TV shows, movie trailers, and malls."

Sal Cinquemani of Slant Magazine wrote that Perry's "lead single 'I Kissed a Girl' features a throbbing beat and an infectious, bi-curious hook, but its self-satisfied, in-your-face posturing rings phony in comparison to the expertly constructed ambiguities of 'Justify My Love' or practically anything in the first decade of Ani DiFranco's catalog; it's like a tween version of DiFranco's tortured bisexual confession 'Light of Some Kind'." Alex Fletcher of Digital Spy described the song as "relatively fun"; however, he claimed it was not "anything truly groundbreaking or controversial". Hiponline.com wrote that the song is "not nearly as interesting or exciting as you'd expect. It's not even half as good as Jill Sobule's song 'I Kissed a Girl'." In 2009, Sobule criticized Perry in an interview stating: "Fuck you, Katy Perry, you fucking stupid, maybe not good for the gays, title-thieving, haven't heard much else, so not quite sure if you're talented, fucking little slut". Days later, Sobule explained that her comments were facetious and that she had no ill feelings toward Perry.

=== Controversy ===
The song received criticism from some members of the LGBT community, although it also had its staunch supporters. Slant Magazine stated the song "isn't problematic because it promotes homosexuality, but because its appropriation of the gay lifestyle exists for the sole purpose of garnering attention — both from Perry's boyfriend and her audience."

Adam Holz of PluggedinOnline, a division of Focus on the Family, wrote an article entitled "A Tale of Two Katys" about the singer's image transformation from a Contemporary Christian music artist to one of the "girls gone wild." He criticizes the song for being the latest, "high-profile message to young women and men that our sexuality is a malleable commodity that can be reshaped at will." Holz also argues that Perry's message carries with it "no need to worry about who might get used or objectified in the process," causing Perry to live "down to a damaging, demeaning stereotype." After numerous reports that Perry's religious parents were against her music and career, she stated in August 2008, "They love and support me."

Toronto Star described it as "a lesbian-friendly tune". The New Gay described the song as "'Guys kissing is gross, girls kissing is hot' line of thought".

On the other hand, according to The Advocate, Perry claims she has heard countless stories of people opening their eyes to their own sexual desires because of the song. Since the release of the song, she has been considered a strong and steadfast supporter of LGBT rights. Out described her as a gay icon. Perry dedicated the music video for "Firework" to the It Gets Better Project. She was additionally awarded the National Equality Award by the Human Rights Campaign.

When asked about her own sexuality, Perry told Santa Barbara magazine: "I like to kiss boys, but there is no doubt in my mind if Angelina Jolie or Gisele Bündchen came a callin', who wouldn't pucker up?" Perry told The New Gay she had never actually kissed a girl. She said "Yeah, it's fantasy, it's a song about curiosity." At an annual fundraiser in 2008, she recalled: "I remember having a little crush when I was 15 on this girl who was a little bit older than me. She was my best friend at the time [but] I never kissed her or anything. In retrospect, she was my muse for that song."

When asked by OK! magazine about kissing a girl, she replied: "Of course. I think I was 19. I kissed a girl and it was great", she also added: "Growing up I had a friend who, looking back, I think I had an obsessive little crush on her. I never kissed her but she was very beautiful and she was like a ballerina and I wanted to copy everything she did. But I think that was kind of the extent of it." In a separate interview in 2010, Perry stated to a female interviewer that she has kissed several girls. Perry later admitted to Vanity Fair in early May 2011 that the reason she did not discuss it honestly at first was that a couple of "sleazy" male journalists made her uncomfortable, she stated: "So I said no, I hadn't experienced it, even though I had, because I didn't like where the guys were taking the interviews."

In February 2009, Márcio Barros, a substitute English language teacher in Distrito Federal, Brazil, public school was fired after he used the song in a class activity among students aged 12 to 14. He was accused of promoting "homosexualism" and alcoholic beverages through the lyrics. The Secretary of Education supported the decision of the head of the school.

In a February 2018 online Glamour article, Perry expressed the following about her song:

We've really changed, conversationally, in the past 10 years. We've come a long way. Bisexuality wasn't as talked about back then, or any type of fluidity. If I had to write that song again, I probably would make an edit on it. Lyrically, it has a couple of stereotypes in it. Your mind changes so much in 10 years, and you grow so much. What's true for you can evolve.

== Commercial performance ==
"I Kissed a Girl" debuted at No. 76 on the US Billboard Hot 100. After a couple of weeks, the single climbed to the top five, due to the rising digital downloads and increasing radio airplay. It continued to rise the next week, reaching No. 2, just behind her labelmates, Coldplay. On the chart dated July 5, 2008, the song peaked at the summit of the Billboard Hot 100, becoming the 1,000th No. 1 song of the rock era (the 961st No. 1 single on the Billboard Hot 100). In addition, the song also gave the Capitol label two consecutive Hot 100 No. 1 singles following Coldplay's "Viva la Vida", making it the first time since 1976 that Capitol had two back-to-back chart-toppers on the Hot 100. The single also crossed over to Billboard's sister publication R&R's Rhythmic chart in its July 5 issue, where not only did she have the highest debut ever for a non-rhythmic track, entering at No. 26 with 1,065 spins, she also had the highest debut from a new artist in over five years. The bow is the best for a debut track at Rhythmic since Beyoncé entered at no. 21 with "Crazy in Love" in 2003. It also has become the first song since Gnarls Barkley's "Crazy" to simultaneously appear on the Mainstream Top 40, Rhythmic, Adult Top 40, and Alternative Songs charts. On July 26, 2008, the track also made history by reaching the No. 1 spot on Billboard's Hot Dance Airplay chart by three weeks, a first for a solo act with a debut single. The song topped the Hot 100 for seven weeks in a row before being dethroned by Rihanna's "Disturbia". It was the second longest-running No. 1 on the Hot 100 of 2008 (tied with T.I.'s "Whatever You Like"), with only Flo Rida's "Low" topping the chart for longer. As of August 2020, the song has been certified sextuple platinum by the Recording Industry Association of America (RIAA) and sold 4.8 million copies in the United States.

In the United Kingdom, "I Kissed a Girl" debuted at number four on the UK Singles Chart on August 3, 2008 ― for the week ending date August 9, 2008. A week later, it topped the chart, where it remained for five weeks (a feat which would not be matched again until "Someone like You" by Adele in 2011) until it was dethroned by "Sex on Fire" by Kings of Leon. Alongside Basshunter's "Now You're Gone" and "Mercy" by Duffy, "I Kissed a Girl" spent more weeks at the top of the UK Singles Chart than any other song in 2008. According to the Official Charts Company, the song has sold over 635,000 copies in Britain as of June 2010. It is the first Virgin label single to sell more than half a million copies since the Spice Girls' "Goodbye" in 1998. As of March 2012, the single had sold 654,560 copies in the United Kingdom, becoming her fourth-best-selling song in Britain, behind "Firework", "Roar" and "California Gurls". The song would also be certified double platinum by the British Phonographic Industry (BPI).

In Canada, the song debuted at number 55 on the Canadian Hot 100, later peaking at the top of the chart, becoming the first country where the song reached the top of the charts. The song would later be certified septuple platinum by Music Canada (MC). In New Zealand, the song debuted at number 33 on the New Zealand Singles Chart, the single's first appearance in other countries'chart outside North America, moving to number three the following week. The song was certified Gold after seven weeks with sales of over 7,500. On August 11, 2008, eight weeks after debuting on the chart, "I Kissed a Girl" finally made it to the summit of the chart. "I Kissed a Girl" was certified platinum in New Zealand after 20 weeks, selling more than 15,000 copies. The song is currently certified triple platinum by Recorded Music NZ. In Australia, the song debuted at number 30 on the ARIA Singles Chart on downloads alone. The next week, it jumped to number two, still on downloads alone. It later jumped to the top of the chart still solely off downloads, becoming only the second single to do so. On July 21, 2008, after the single's physical release, the track retained its number one position and was certified Gold. The single held the No. 1 position for several weeks and was certified double platinum. The song is currently certified nonuple platinum by the Australian Recording Industry Association (ARIA), the most certifications of the song.

As of July 2021, "I Kissed a Girl" has sold 11.81 million copies worldwide. According to Perry, the song became a massive hit for being musically "catchy". She told BBC News: "I think that it's one of those subject matters that is, you know, like 'Oh my God I can't believe she said that, that someone came out and said it.' I think that, whenever anyone writes something that is different than, like, your plain peanut butter and jelly song, 'I love you, you love me,' everyone kind of perks up and says 'what's this?'"

== Music video ==
A music video for the song was released on May 16, 2008, on Perry's personal website and on Myspace. The video was directed by Kinga Burza and features a Moulin Rouge and burlesque-type setting with scenes of Perry, along with many other flamboyantly dressed women dancing to the song. Towards the end of the video, she wakes up next to a male companion, played by DJ Skeet Skeet. Despite the song's title, there is no depiction of same-sex kissing at all. Perry features her real-life friend and DJ, Mia Moretti, Markus Molinari's cat Bella, and Kesha in the music video. The video would go on to be nominated for four MTV Video Music Awards at the 2008 ceremony, and won in the Best Pop Video category at the 2009 MTV Video Music Awards Japan.

== Accolades ==
The song was listed at the ASCAP Pop Music Awards as one of 50 Most Performed Songs of 2008. Other honors given to the song include the following:

Year	Organization	Award	Result	Ref.
2008	Los Premios MTV Latinoamérica	Song of the Year	Nominated	
2008	MTV Europe Music Awards	Most Addictive Track	Nominated	
2008	MTV Video Music Awards	Best Art Direction	Nominated	
2008	MTV Video Music Awards	Best Cinematography	Nominated	
2008	MTV Video Music Awards	Best Editing	Nominated	
2008	MTV Video Music Awards	Best Female Video	Nominated	
2008	MTV Video Music Awards	Best New Artist	Nominated	
2008	Q Awards	Best Track	Nominated	
2008	The Record of the Year	The Record of the Year	Nominated	
2008	Teen Choice Awards	Choice Music: Summer Song	Nominated	
2009	Grammy Awards	Best Female Pop Vocal Performance	Nominated	
2009	MTV Video Music Awards Japan	Best Pop Video	Won	
2009	MTV Video Music Awards Japan	Best New Artist	Nominated	
2009	MuchMusic Video Awards	UR Fave: International Artist	Nominated	
2009	Nickelodeon Kids' Choice Awards	Favorite Song	Nominated	
2009	People's Choice Awards	Favorite Pop Song	Won	

== Cover versions ==
A cover version by Barnicle entered the UK Singles Chart (published August 3, 2008) at position No. 116.

In March 2008, the song was also covered by electronicore band Attack Attack! on Punk Goes Pop Vol. 2.

Perry's version was brought forward from a September 1 release to July 30, 2008. On August 3, 2008, the song, which had entered the UK Singles Chart at No. 139 the week before, climbed to reach position No. 4.

Cobra Starship recorded the parody "I Kissed a Boy" in summer 2008, subsequently included on the Fall Out Boy mixtape Welcome to the New Administration, released around the same time of the 18th of August, 2008.

A chill indie pop cover by April Jai was released in August 2023.

== Usage in media ==
The song is featured in the films Fiston, Blended, Boy Meets Girl and Pitch Perfect 2, the musical & Juliet, and the television shows Glee, Skins, The Hills, 20 to 1, The Big Bang Theory, The Game, and RuPaul's Drag Race All Stars.

== Track listing ==
CD single

1. "I Kissed a Girl" – 3:00
2. "I Kissed a Girl" (Jason Nevins Funkrokr Extended Mix) – 6:51
3. "I Kissed a Girl" (Dr. Luke & Benny Blanco Remix) – 3:28

== Remixes ==
Jason Nevins Mixes

- "I Kissed a Girl" (Jason Nevins Funkrokr Extended Mix) – 6:51
- "I Kissed a Girl" (Jason Nevins Funkrokr Edit) – 3:33

Dr. Luke & Benny Blanco Mixes

- "I Kissed a Girl" (Dr. Luke & Benny Blanco Mix) – 3:28
- "I Kissed a Girl" (Dr. Luke & Benny Blanco Extended Mix) – 6:06
- "I Kissed a Girl" (Rock Mix) – 2:57
- "I Kissed a Girl" (Rock Mix - Instrumental) – 2:57

Norman & Attalla Mixes

- "I Kissed a Girl" (Norman & Attalla Remix) – 8:00
- "I Kissed a Girl" (Norman & Attalla Radio Edit) – 3:43

Morgan Page Mix

- "I Kissed a Girl" (Morgan Page Remix) – 4:04

The Knocks Mix

- "I Kissed a Girl" (The Knocks Remix) – 4:37

== Charts ==
=== Weekly charts ===
Weekly chart performance for "I Kissed a Girl"
Chart (2008–2023)	Peak position
Australia (ARIA)	1
Austria (Ö3 Austria Top 40)	1
Belgium (Ultratop 50 Flanders)	1
Belgium (Ultratop 50 Wallonia)	3
Canada Hot 100 (Billboard)	1
Canada CHR/Top 40 (Billboard)	1
Canada Hot AC (Billboard)	1
Canada Rock (Billboard)	33
Chile (EFE)	3
CIS Airplay (TopHit)	2
Croatia International Airplay (HRT)	1
Czech Republic Airplay (ČNS IFPI)	1
Denmark (Tracklisten)	1
Europe (Eurochart Hot 100)	1
Finland (Suomen virallinen lista)	4
France (SNEP)	5
France Airplay (SNEP)	2
France Download (SNEP)	1
Germany (GfK)	1
Greece Digital Songs (Billboard)	2
Hungary (Dance Top 40)	4
Hungary (Rádiós Top 40)	1
Hungary (Single Top 40)	9
Ireland (IRMA)	1
Israel (Media Forest)	3
Italy (FIMI)	1
Japan Hot 100 (Billboard)	10
Mexico Anglo (Monitor Latino)	5
Netherlands (Dutch Top 40)	1
Netherlands (Single Top 100)	3
New Zealand (Recorded Music NZ)	1
Norway (VG-lista)	1
Poland (Airplay Chart)	2
Portugal Digital Songs (Billboard)	2
Russia Airplay (TopHit)	5
Scottish Singles Sales (Official Charts)	1
Slovakia Airplay (ČNS IFPI)	4
Spain (Promusicae)	19
Spain Airplay (PROMUSICAE)	5
Sweden (Sverigetopplistan)	1
Switzerland (Schweizer Hitparade)	1
UK Singles (Official Charts)	1
Ukraine Airplay (TopHit)	7
US Billboard Hot 100	1
US Adult Pop Airplay (Billboard)	16
US Alternative Airplay (Billboard)	27
US Dance Club Songs (Billboard)	25
US Pop Airplay (Billboard)	2
US Rhythmic Airplay (Billboard)	15

Weekly chart performance for "I Kissed a Girl" (Jason Nevins Funkrokr Edit)
Chart (2008)	Peak position
Russia Airplay (TopHit)	94

=== Year-end charts ===
2008 year-end chart performance for "I Kissed a Girl"
Chart (2008)	Position
Australia (ARIA)	6
Austria (Ö3 Austria Top 40)	4
Belgium (Ultratop 50 Flanders)	7
Belgium (Ultratop 50 Wallonia)	41
Brazil (Crowley)	95
Canada (Canadian Hot 100)	5
Canada CHR/Top 40 (Billboard)	6
Canada Hot AC (Billboard)	19
CIS (TopHit)	29
Europe (Eurochart Hot 100)	4
Finland (Suomen virallinen lista)	1
France (SNEP)	34
Germany (Media Control GfK)	5
Hungary (Dance Top 40)	56
Hungary (Rádiós Top 40)	25
Ireland (IRMA)	5
Italy (FIMI)	6
Netherlands (Dutch Top 40)	17
Netherlands (Single Top 100)	19
New Zealand (RIANZ)	9
Russia Airplay (TopHit)	46
Sweden (Sverigetopplistan)	5
Switzerland (Schweizer Hitparade)	8
UK Singles (OCC)	4
Ukraine Airplay (TopHit)	97
US Billboard Hot 100	14
US Mainstream Top 40 (Billboard)	16
Worldwide (IFPI)	7

2009 year-end chart performance for "I Kissed a Girl"
Chart (2009)	Position
Europe (Eurochart Hot 100)	54
Finland (Suomen virallinen lista)	35
Hungary (Dance Top 40)	42
Hungary (Rádiós Top 40)	12
Italy (Musica e dischi)	92
Switzerland (Schweizer Hitparade)	48
UK Singles (OCC)	176

2019 year-end chart performance for "I Kissed a Girl"
Chart (2019)	Position
Ukraine Airplay (TopHit)	198

2023 year-end chart performance for "I Kissed a Girl"
Chart (2023)	Position
Hungary (Rádiós Top 40)	89
Ukraine Airplay (TopHit)	157

2024 year-end chart performance for "I Kissed a Girl"
Chart (2024)	Position
Hungary (Rádiós Top 40)	56

2025 year-end chart performance for "I Kissed a Girl"
Chart (2025)	Position
Hungary (Rádiós Top 40)	84

=== Decade-end charts ===
Decade-end chart performance for "I Kissed a Girl"
Chart (2000–2009)	Position
Australia (ARIA)	22
Germany (Official German Charts)	29
Russia Airplay (TopHit)	196
US Billboard Hot 100	66

== Certifications and sales ==
Region	Certification	Certified units/sales
Australia (ARIA)	9× Platinum	630,000^{‡}
Austria (IFPI Austria)	Platinum	30,000^{*}
Belgium (BRMA)	Gold	
Brazil (Pro-Música Brasil)	2× Platinum	120,000^{‡}
Brazil (Pro-Música Brasil) DMS	Platinum	60,000^{*}
Brazil (Pro-Música Brasil) Jason Nevins Funkrokr Extended Mix	Platinum	60,000^{*}
Canada (Music Canada)	7× Platinum	280,000^{*}
Denmark (IFPI Danmark)	3× Platinum	45,000^{^}
Finland (Musiikkituottajat)	Platinum	14,072 (Note: Finland sales figures as of 2008.)
France (SNEP)	Diamond	333,333^{‡}
Germany (BVMI)	5× Gold	750,000^{‡}
Italy	—	25,000 (Note: Italy sales figures as of December 2008.)
Italy (FIMI) since 2009	Platinum	100,000^{‡}
Norway (IFPI Norway)	Platinum	60,000^{‡}
New Zealand (RMNZ)	4× Platinum	120,000^{‡}
Spain (Promusicae)	Platinum	20,000^{*}
Spain (Promusicae) since 2015	Platinum	60,000^{‡}
Sweden (GLF)	Platinum	20,000^{^}
Switzerland (IFPI Switzerland)	Platinum	30,000^{^}
United Kingdom (BPI)	3× Platinum	1,800,000^{‡}
United States (RIAA)	6× Platinum	6,000,000^{‡}
Ringtone
Canada (Music Canada)	6× Platinum	240,000^{*}
Spain (Promusicae)	Gold	10,000^{*}
Streaming
Greece (IFPI Greece)	Platinum	2,000,000^{†}
Summaries
Worldwide	—	11,810,000 (Note: Worldwide sales figures as of July 2021.)
^{*} Sales figures based on certification alone.^{^} Shipments figures based on certification alone.^{‡} Sales+streaming figures based on certification alone.^{†} Streaming-only figures based on certification alone.

== Release history ==
Release dates and formats for "I Kissed a Girl"
Region	Date	Format(s)	Version(s)	Label(s)	Ref.
United States	April 28, 2008	Digital download	Original	Capitol	
Various	April 29, 2008	Digital download	Original	Capitol	
United States	May 13, 2008	Contemporary hit radio	Original	Capitol	
United States	June 23, 2008	Rhythmic contemporary radio	Original	Capitol	
Various	July 19, 2008	Digital EP	Various (Note: The release included such versions as: original, instrumental, and Jason Nevins Funkrokr extended mix.)	Capitol	
Various	August 1, 2008	Digital EP	Original; remixes (Note: Remixes released in those releases include: Jason Nevins Funkrokr extended mix and Dr. Luke & Benny Blanco remix.)	Capitol	
Germany	August 1, 2008	CD	Original; remixes	Capitol	
France	August 25, 2008	CD	Original	Capitol	
United Kingdom	September 1, 2008	CD	Original	Virgin	
United States	September 30, 2008	CD	Original	Capitol	
Various	September 30, 2008	Digital EP	Remixes	Capitol	
Canada	November 11, 2020	12-inch	MTV Unplugged version	Capitol	
United States	November 11, 2020	12-inch	MTV Unplugged version	Capitol	

== See also ==
- List of Ultratop 50 number-one singles of 2008
- List of Hot 100 number-one singles of 2008 (Canada)
- List of Danish number-one hits
- List of European number-one hits of 2008
- List of number-one hits of 2008 (Germany)
- List of number-one singles of 2008 (Ireland)
- List of number-one hits of 2008 (Italy)
- List of Dutch Top 40 number-one singles of 2008
- List of number-one hits of 2008 (Austria)
- List of number-one singles of 2008 (Australia)
- List of number-one singles (Sweden)
- List of number-one hits of 2008 (Switzerland)
- List of UK Singles Chart number ones of the 2000s
- List of Hot 100 number-one singles of 2008 (U.S.)
- List of number-one songs in Norway
- List of number-one singles from the 2000s (New Zealand)
- List of Billboard Hot 100 top 10 singles in 2008
- List of best-selling singles in the United States
- Grammy Award for Best Female Pop Vocal Performance
