= List of Billboard Hot 100 number ones of 2008 =

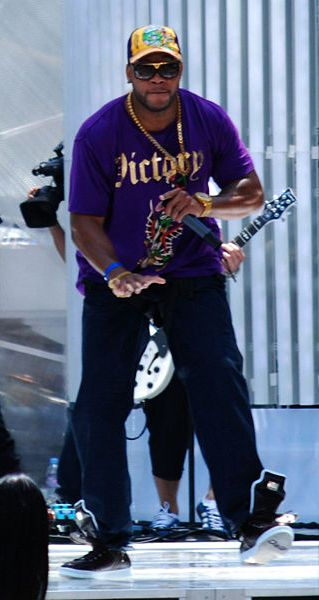
Flo Rida's first U.S. number-one single "Low" was the longest-running number-one of 2008, topping the chart for 10 consecutive weeks.

The Billboard Hot 100 is a chart that ranks the best-performing singles of the United States. Published by Billboard magazine, the data is compiled by Nielsen SoundScan based collectively on each single's weekly physical and digital sales, and airplay. In 2008, there were 14 singles that topped the chart in 52 issues of the magazine.

Rapper Flo Rida's "Low" was the first number one of the year, and the longest-running single in 2008, staying at number one for 10 consecutive weeks. It is the longest stay at the top for a single since R&B singer Beyoncé's "Irreplaceable" reigned for 10 straight weeks starting in late 2006. "Low" is the best-performing single of 2008 in the United States, ranking number one on Billboard's year end chart of the Top Hot 100 Hits of 2008. Other singles with extended runs at number one include Katy Perry's "I Kissed a Girl", which stayed at the top spot for seven straight weeks, and T.I.'s "Whatever You Like", which topped the chart for seven non-consecutive weeks.

In 2008, seven acts gained their first U.S. number-one single: Flo Rida, Leona Lewis, Lil Wayne, Coldplay, and Perry, all of whom were lead artists, and Young Jeezy and Static Major as featured guests. Static Major was the seventh artist to hit number one posthumously, after his death in February 2008. T.I. earned his first number-one single as lead artist with "Whatever You Like". He also had the most weeks on top with 13, combining his two singles "Whatever You Like" and "Live Your Life", the latter of which charted at number one for six non-consecutive weeks. Artists to have multiple number one hits during the year were Rihanna with three, (one of those as a featured artist credit in "Live Your Life"), and T.I. with two. Rihanna spent the most time of any female at the top, spending nine non-consecutive weeks at number one on three different songs.

Highlights of the 2008 Billboard Hot 100 issues included pop singer Britney Spears' "Womanizer", which was noted for its record-breaking leap to number-one, from number 96. This is Spears' second number-one single, and her first number-one single in nine years. Pop singer Mariah Carey earned her 18th U.S. number-one single with "Touch My Body", which broke her tie with Elvis Presley, putting her in second position for artists with the most number ones in the rock era, which began in 1955. Leaving Carey two behind The Beatles with twenty number one singles. Singer Leona Lewis' "Bleeding Love" earned her the recognition of being the third female British act to have topped the Billboard Hot 100 with a debut single in the entire rock era. Perry's "I Kissed a Girl" became the 1,000th number-one song of the rock era. Although it occupied seven of summer's thirteen weeks, critics remained divided over which is 2008's Song of the Summer.

== Chart history ==
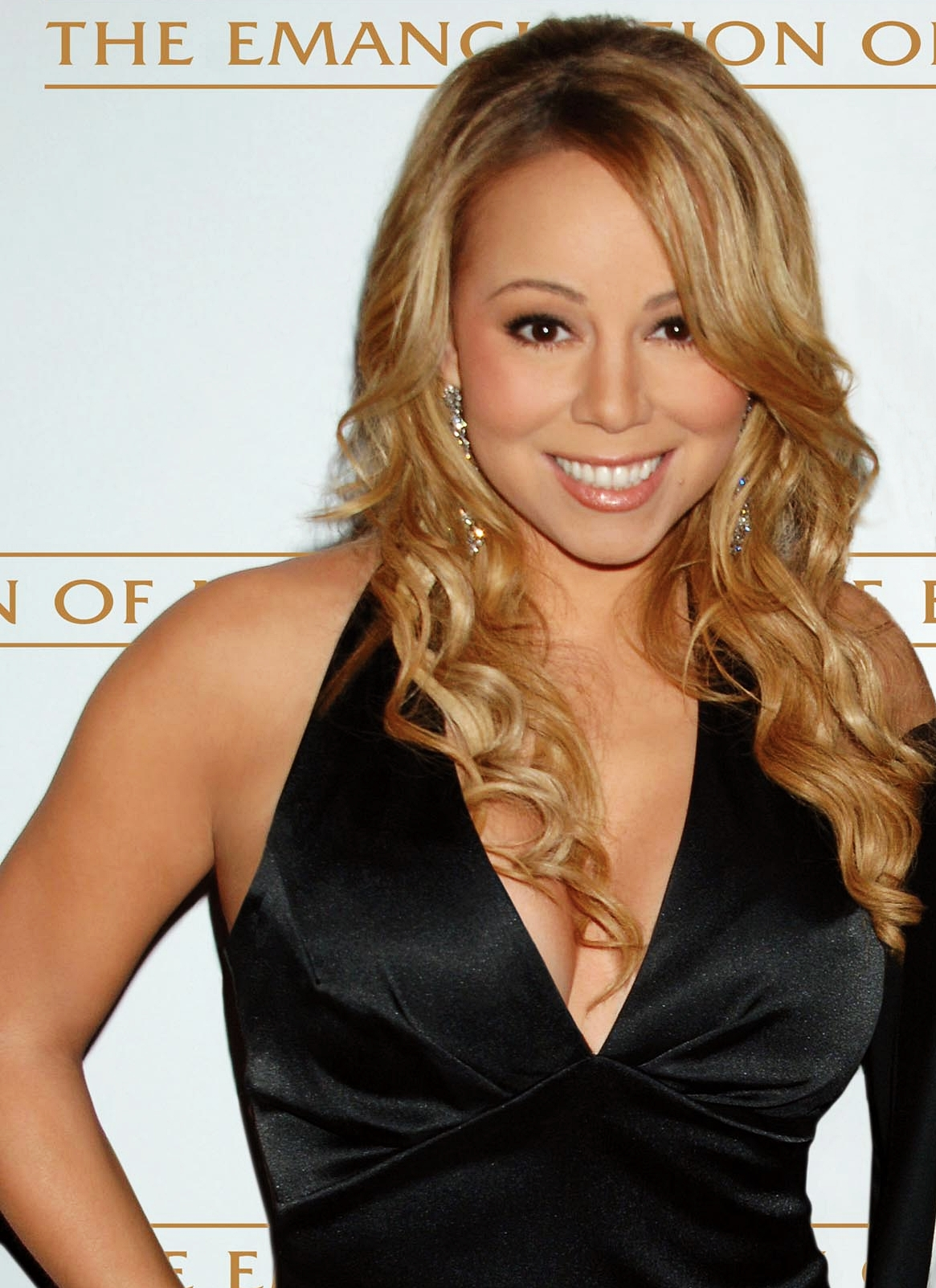
Pop singer Mariah Carey earned her 18th number-one single when "Touch My Body" topped the chart, which broke her tie with Elvis Presley and puts her in second place behind The Beatles with the most number-one hits.

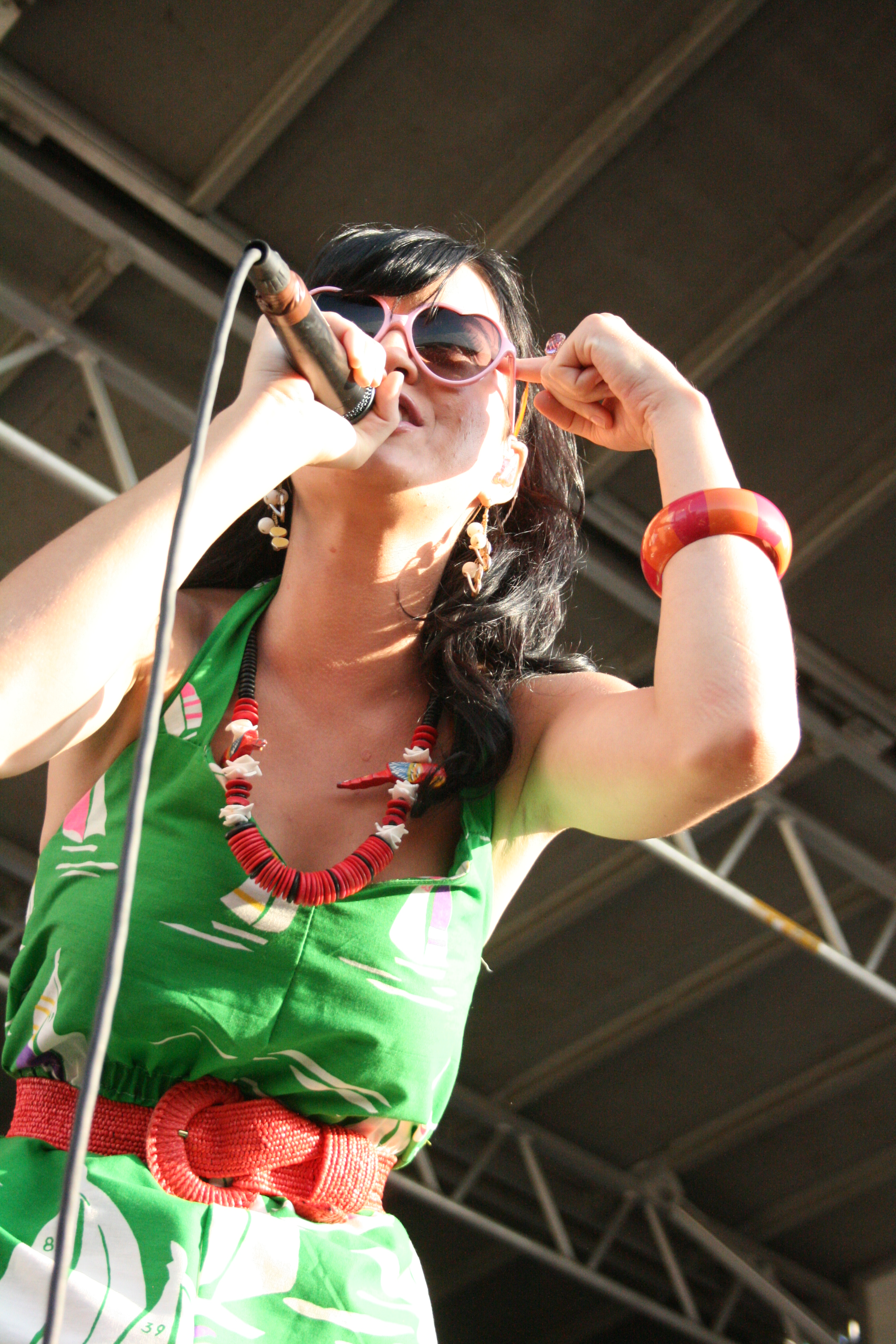
Singer Katy Perry earned her first U.S. number-one single, "I Kissed a Girl", this year. The single became the 1,000th number-one song of the rock era.

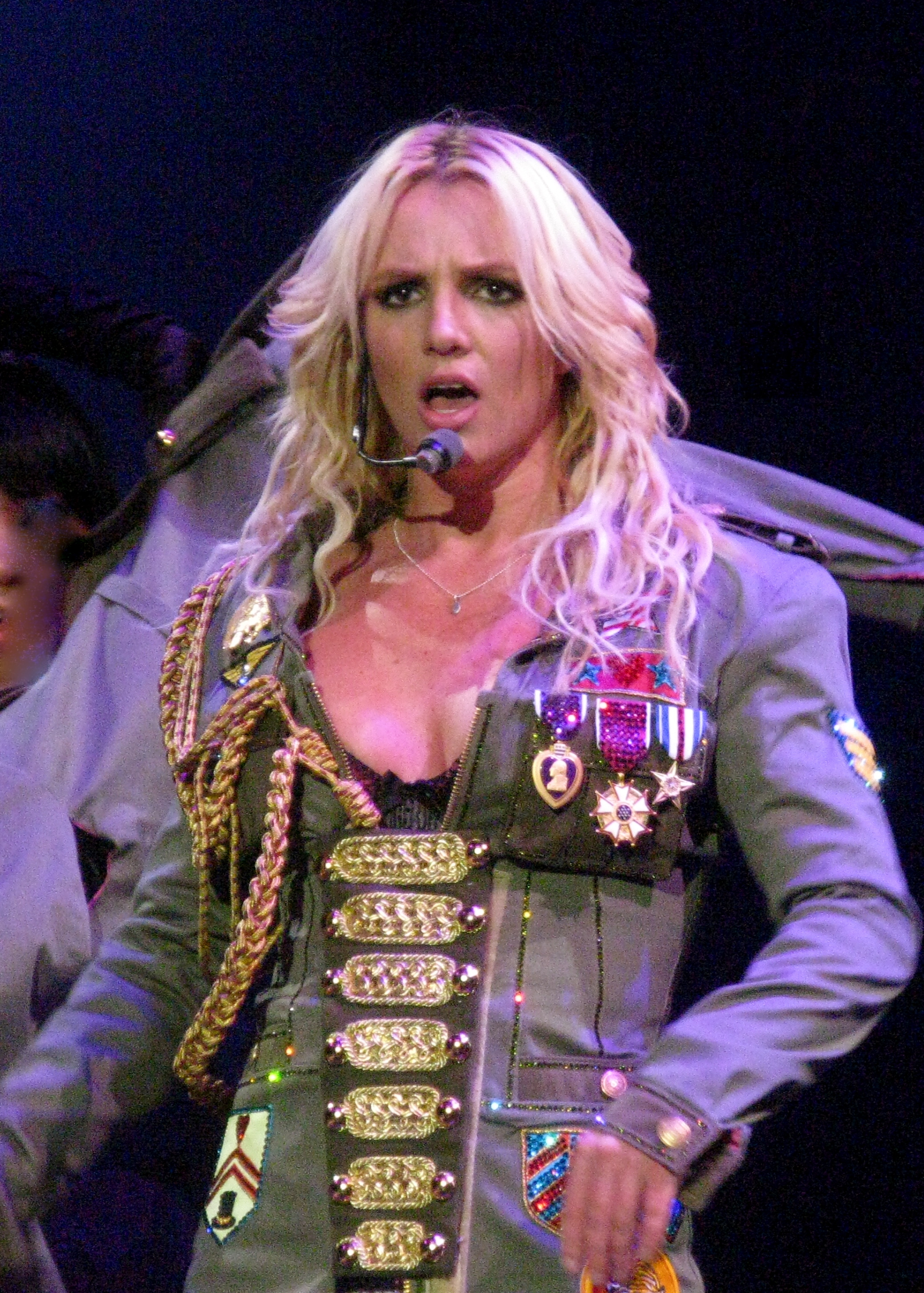
Pop singer Britney Spears gained her second U.S. number one single, more than nine years after her debut single topped the chart.

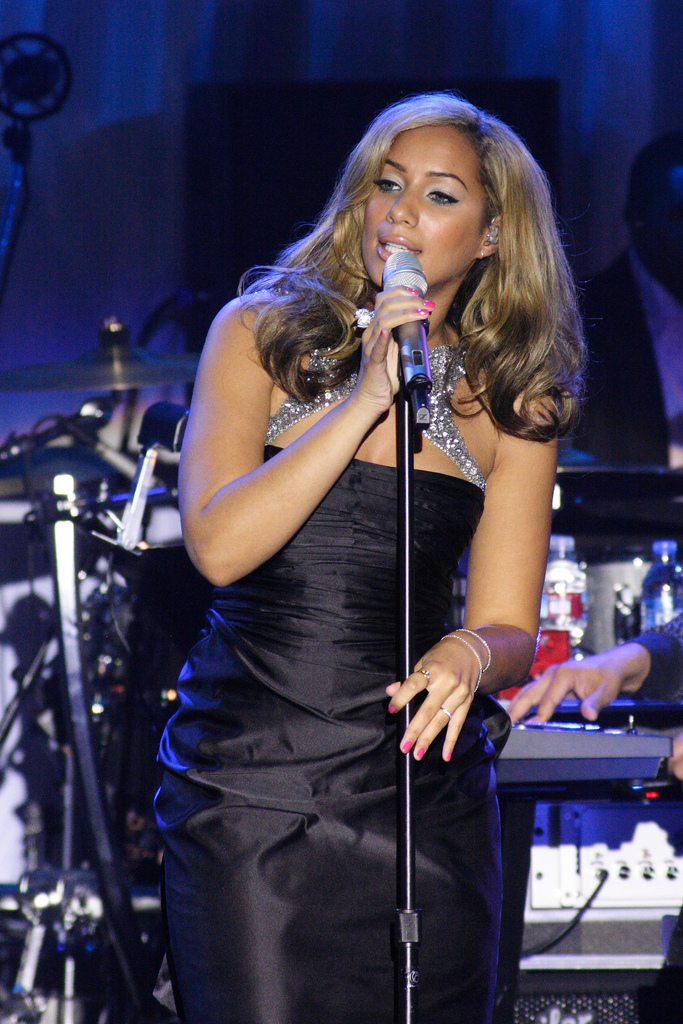
Pop singer Leona Lewis earned her first U.S. number-one single, becoming third-ever female British act to top the Billboard Hot 100 with a debut single in the entire rock era.

Key
†	Indicates best-performing single of 2008

No.	Issue date	Song	Artist(s)	Ref.
954	January 5	"Low"†	Flo Rida featuring T-Pain	
954	January 12	"Low"†	Flo Rida featuring T-Pain	
954	January 19	"Low"†	Flo Rida featuring T-Pain	
954	January 26	"Low"†	Flo Rida featuring T-Pain	
954	February 2	"Low"†	Flo Rida featuring T-Pain	
954	February 9	"Low"†	Flo Rida featuring T-Pain	
954	February 16	"Low"†	Flo Rida featuring T-Pain	
954	February 23	"Low"†	Flo Rida featuring T-Pain	
954	March 1	"Low"†	Flo Rida featuring T-Pain	
954	March 8	"Low"†	Flo Rida featuring T-Pain	
955	March 15	"Love in This Club"	Usher featuring Young Jeezy	
955	March 22	"Love in This Club"	Usher featuring Young Jeezy	
955	March 29	"Love in This Club"	Usher featuring Young Jeezy	
956	April 5	"Bleeding Love"	Leona Lewis	
957	April 12	"Touch My Body"	Mariah Carey	
957	April 19	"Touch My Body"	Mariah Carey	
re	April 26	"Bleeding Love"	Leona Lewis	
958	May 3	"Lollipop"	Lil Wayne featuring Static Major	
re	May 10	"Bleeding Love"	Leona Lewis	
re	May 17	"Bleeding Love"	Leona Lewis	
959	May 24	"Take a Bow"	Rihanna	
re	May 31	"Lollipop"	Lil Wayne featuring Static Major	
re	June 7	"Lollipop"	Lil Wayne featuring Static Major	
re	June 14	"Lollipop"	Lil Wayne featuring Static Major	
re	June 21	"Lollipop"	Lil Wayne featuring Static Major	
960	June 28	"Viva la Vida"	Coldplay	
961	July 5	"I Kissed a Girl"	Katy Perry	
961	July 12	"I Kissed a Girl"	Katy Perry	
961	July 19	"I Kissed a Girl"	Katy Perry	
961	July 26	"I Kissed a Girl"	Katy Perry	
961	August 2	"I Kissed a Girl"	Katy Perry	
961	August 9	"I Kissed a Girl"	Katy Perry	
961	August 16	"I Kissed a Girl"	Katy Perry	
962	August 23	"Disturbia"	Rihanna	
962	August 30	"Disturbia"	Rihanna	
963	September 6	"Whatever You Like"	T.I.	
963	September 13	"Whatever You Like"	T.I.	
963	September 20	"Whatever You Like"	T.I.	
964	September 27	"So What"	Pink	
re	October 4	"Whatever You Like"	T.I.	
re	October 11	"Whatever You Like"	T.I.	
965	October 18	"Live Your Life"	T.I. featuring Rihanna	
966	October 25	"Womanizer"	Britney Spears	
re	November 1	"Whatever You Like"	T.I.	
re	November 8	"Whatever You Like"	T.I.	
re	November 15	"Live Your Life"	T.I. featuring Rihanna	
re	November 22	"Live Your Life"	T.I. featuring Rihanna	
re	November 29	"Live Your Life"	T.I. featuring Rihanna	
re	December 6	"Live Your Life"	T.I. featuring Rihanna	
967	December 13	"Single Ladies (Put a Ring on It)"	Beyoncé	
re	December 20	"Live Your Life"	T.I. featuring Rihanna	
re	December 27	"Single Ladies (Put a Ring on It)"	Beyoncé	

== Number-one artists ==
List of number-one artists by total weeks at number one
Position	Artist	Weeks at No. 1
1	T.I.	13
2	Flo Rida	10
2	T-Pain	10
4	Rihanna	9
5	Katy Perry	7
6	Lil Wayne	5
6	Static Major	5
8	Leona Lewis	4
9	Usher	3
9	Young Jeezy	3
11	Mariah Carey	2
11	Beyoncé	2
13	Coldplay	1
13	Pink	1
13	Britney Spears	1

== See also ==
- 2008 in music
- List of Billboard number-one singles
- Top Hot 100 Hits of 2008
- List of Billboard Hot 100 number-one singles of the 2000s

== Additional sources ==
- Fred Bronson's Billboard Book of Number 1 Hits, 5th Edition (ISBN 0-8230-7677-6)
- Joel Whitburn's Top Pop Singles 1955-2008, 12 Edition (ISBN 0-89820-180-2)
- Joel Whitburn Presents the Billboard Hot 100 Charts: The 2000s (ISBN 0-89820-182-9)
- Additional information obtained can be verified within Billboard's online archive services and print editions of the magazine.
