= Touch My Body =

2008 single by Mariah Carey

Single by Mariah Carey

from the album E=MC²
- Released: February 12, 2008
- Recorded: 2007
- Studio: Legacy Recording (New York City); Triangle Sound (Atlanta)
- Genre: Pop; R&B
- Length: 3:24
- Label: Island
- Songwriters: Mariah Carey; Crystal Johnson; Terius Nash; Christopher Stewart
- Producers: Mariah Carey; Tricky Stewart

Mariah Carey singles chronology
| "Lil' L.O.V.E." (2007) | "Touch My Body" (2008) | "Bye Bye" (2008) |

Music video
- "Touch My Body" on YouTube

"Touch My Body" is a song by American singer-songwriter Mariah Carey, released as the lead single from her eleventh studio album, E=MC² (2008), on February 12, 2008, by Island Records. Carey co-produced the song with Tricky Stewart, and they co-wrote it with Crystal "Cri$tyle" Johnson and Terius "The-Dream" Nash. The song's lyrics feature a double message, with the first describing sexual fantasies with her lover, while also jokingly warning him against recording or releasing information regarding their rendezvous.

"Touch My Body" received generally positive reviews from music critics, with many highlighting its light pop melody and hook; some of them, however, felt it did not properly represent the singer's vocal range. "Touch My Body" became Carey's eighteenth chart topper on the Billboard Hot 100, making her the solo artist with the most number one singles in United States history, surpassing the record held by Elvis Presley. It also gave Carey her 79th week atop the chart, tying Presley for most weeks at number one. Outside the US, the song reached the top-five in Italy, Japan, New Zealand, Switzerland, and the United Kingdom.

The song's music video was directed by filmmaker Brett Ratner, who had previously worked with Carey on several other music videos. It follows a story revolving around a computer employee's fantasy where, as he visits Carey's home and fixes her computer, he enters a fantasy in which the pair perform several activities together, all while Carey shows off her figure in several revealing outfits. The music video won in the category of "Best Comedic Video" at the 2008 BET Awards, and won the "MTV Video Vanguard Award" at the 2008 MTV Video Music Awards Japan. Additionally, the video was nominated for "Best Female Video" at the 2008 MTV Video Music Awards. Carey performed "Touch My Body" on several live televised events and programs, such as Saturday Night Live and Good Morning America, and also included on the set-list of the Angels Advocate Tour (2009–10).

== Background and release ==
Carey achieved critical and commercial success with her tenth studio album, The Emancipation of Mimi (2005). and the second best-seller around the world, It earned a myriad of music industry awards, and brought Carey back to the top of pop music following her decline in 2001. After completing The Adventures of Mimi Tour, Carey began working on material for her eleventh studio effort, the yet untitled E=MC² (2008). E=MC² was hailed as one of the most anticipated albums of 2008, with many critics weighing their opinions on whether Carey would be able to deliver significant success, following her achievements with The Emancipation of Mimi. "Touch My Body" was eventually chosen as the lead single through a vote in between the record executives at Island Records, with the final choices being the former and "I'm That Chick" (titled "I'm That Chick You Like" at that point). After choosing the former, the song was sent to radio stations worldwide on February 12, 2008 and to digital outlets on March 24, 2008.

== Composition ==
"Touch My Body"
A 19-second sample of "Touch My Body", featuring the piano and keyboard-driven melody, and production that's accentuated by the addition of finger snaps and electronic synthesizers. Lyrically, the song features Carey describing various "soft-core" fantasies with a lover, however also warning of its recording. Though technically sexually explicit, critics deemed the song playful and feminine, due to its soft instrumentation, as well as Carey's light vocals.

"Touch My Body" is a mid-tempo song, which draws influence from R&B and pop music genres. The song's hook is built around a piano melody and "circular keyboard line", and features "a stuttering mid-tempo beat that's accented by finger snaps and electronic synthesizers" as its instrumentation. Sarah Rodman of The Boston Globe described it as a "standard-issue mid-tempo jam", while The New York Sun's Jayanthi Daniel wrote "It's a smooth, mid-tempo song with a swaying, melodic beat, and serves as a simple and mellow introduction to the material." Writing for The Guardian, Alex Macpherson felt the song was very "girly", and expressed how the "cushioned" track incorporates "all tactile bass bumps and tinkling music box motifs" into its production. Written by Mariah Carey, The-Dream, Tricky Stewart and Cristyle, the song drew comparisons to several musical arrangements featured throughout "We Belong Together". According to the sheet music published at Musicnotes.com by Sony/ATV Music Publishing, "Touch My Body" is set in common time with a tempo of 78.5 beats per minute. It is composed in the key of B minor, with Carey's vocal range spanning from the low-note of F♯_{3} to the belting range of E_{5}. and the high-note of B_{5}. The song follows in the chord progression of Em7–A–Bm–A–Bm.

Lyrically, the song describes the protagonist revealing several bedroom fantasies in which she would like to engage, asking her lover playfully to "touch her body". Though the song features sexually oriented lyrics, critics deemed that the melody and playful tone of the song made them less explicit. The song's lyrics find Carey maintaining the duo keep the relationship private from the media, as she threatens to "hunt him down" if he shall record anything of their private life. She mentions talk show host, Wendy Williams. According to Ben Ratliff from The New York Times, "Touch My Body" is a "questionably sexy striptease: a goofy-sleazy tryst vignette", with Carey singing "If there's a camera up in here then I best not catch this flick on YouTube." Critic Rodman felt the song's lyrics describe the protagonist's sexual fantasies, but also serves as a warning to "potential touchers: 'If you run your mouth and brag about our secret rendezvous / I will hunt you down.' Yikes!" In an interview with Fox News, journalist Hollie McKay asked Carey if there was any literal interpretation regarding the lyrics "Touch My Body / Put Me on the Floor / Wrestle Me Around / Play With Me Some More", to which she replied "There is no full-blown meaning; it is just cute and it's one of those songs that makes me happy. I wasn't taking it that seriously. It was just fun experience." Evan Sawdey from PopMatters wrote that in the song "Mariah coos soft-core phone sex fantasies over plinked piano notes, all while referencing YouTube in what appears to be a desperate grab for relevance." In his review of the song's parent album, Los Angeles Times critic Richard Hartog described the song's production, Carey's vocals and its overall mixing:

"Touch My Body" rides a relatively restrained slow-dance groove, with some light, orchestral-synth flourishes thrown in. The rhythm is almost completely carried by an effortless keyboard bump, the easygoing repetitiveness of which eventually wears the listener down, and sets up a delicate frame for Carey to sing around. She pulls back when the song picks up the pace, and Carey keeps it simple here, playing with tempos rather than range. Indeed, she almost quietly slides into the chorus. "If you run around and brag about this secret rendezvous, I will hunt you down", she sings, letting the last line trail off. But you don't necessarily believe her, as the feel is more playful that sinful.

== Critical reception ==
Professional ratings
Review scores
| Source | Rating |
|---|---|
| BBC Radio 1 | 3/5 stars |
| Blues & Soul | 8/10 |
| Digital Spy | 3/5 stars |
| The Irish Times | 2/5 stars |
| Stereogum | 5/10 |

"Touch My Body" garnered generally positive reviews from music critics. While most reviewers complimented the song's hook and production, as well as its playful lyrics, some were critical of Carey's vocal performance, which they felt didn't properly demonstrate her voice. Billboard's Chuck Taylor gave the song a positive review, writing "this sensual jam is 100% Mariah, packed with satisfying harmonic layers and hooky background 'oh's,' supersonic verses and a chorus as catchy as a winter sniffle," Bill Lamb from About.com rated the song four out of five stars, stating that the single "is simple, sexy elegance from one of the most enduring of pop stars." Additionally, Lamb complimented the songs "clever and sexy lyrics", and wrote "The gentle finger-snapping beat will send countless fans dancing in private reveries." Newsday critic, Glenn Gamboa, named it as the "Song of the Week", commenting that it was "the best opening single she's had since 'Heartbreaker'."

Nick Levine of Digital Spy was also impressed with the song, writing, "its cooing, sensual charms soon take hold, suggesting the wind's still very much behind the Carey comeback bandwagon." It was described as a "cheeky hit" by Margeaux Watson of Entertainment Weekly, and "playful" by Los Angeles Times's Chuck Philips. Aside from common criticism aimed at Carey's lack of vocal bombast, many made heavy comparisons to its predecessor, "We Belong Together". Freedom Du Lac from The Washington Post compared the two heavily, while PopMatters's Evan Sawdey felt it was "stealing the structure that made 'We Belong Together' such a great song." In his critique, he continued "For being an album from one of the world's biggest pop stars, its amazing how hook-free and dated if feels a mere two weeks after its release." Slant Magazine's critic and writer, Sal Cinquemani, wrote that the single "isn't exactly filled with combustible energy and it lacks the full-throttle belting that accompanied the Return of the Voice three years ago, but it features all of the characteristics one expects from a latter-day Mariah track." Rachel Devitt of Rhapsody expressed a desire to see Carey "show off those legendary five octaves a bit more", while also noting the song's "slightly paranoid/just-this-side-of-crazy lyrics threatening to hunt down her lover if he videos their tryst." New York Daily News critic, David Hinckley, was critical on the song's simplicity, and wrote "[It's] a single that could have been cut by any one-hit diva-ette today — has scored a chart grand slam. There's just one small price to pay for all this: the singer's soul."

== Chart performance ==
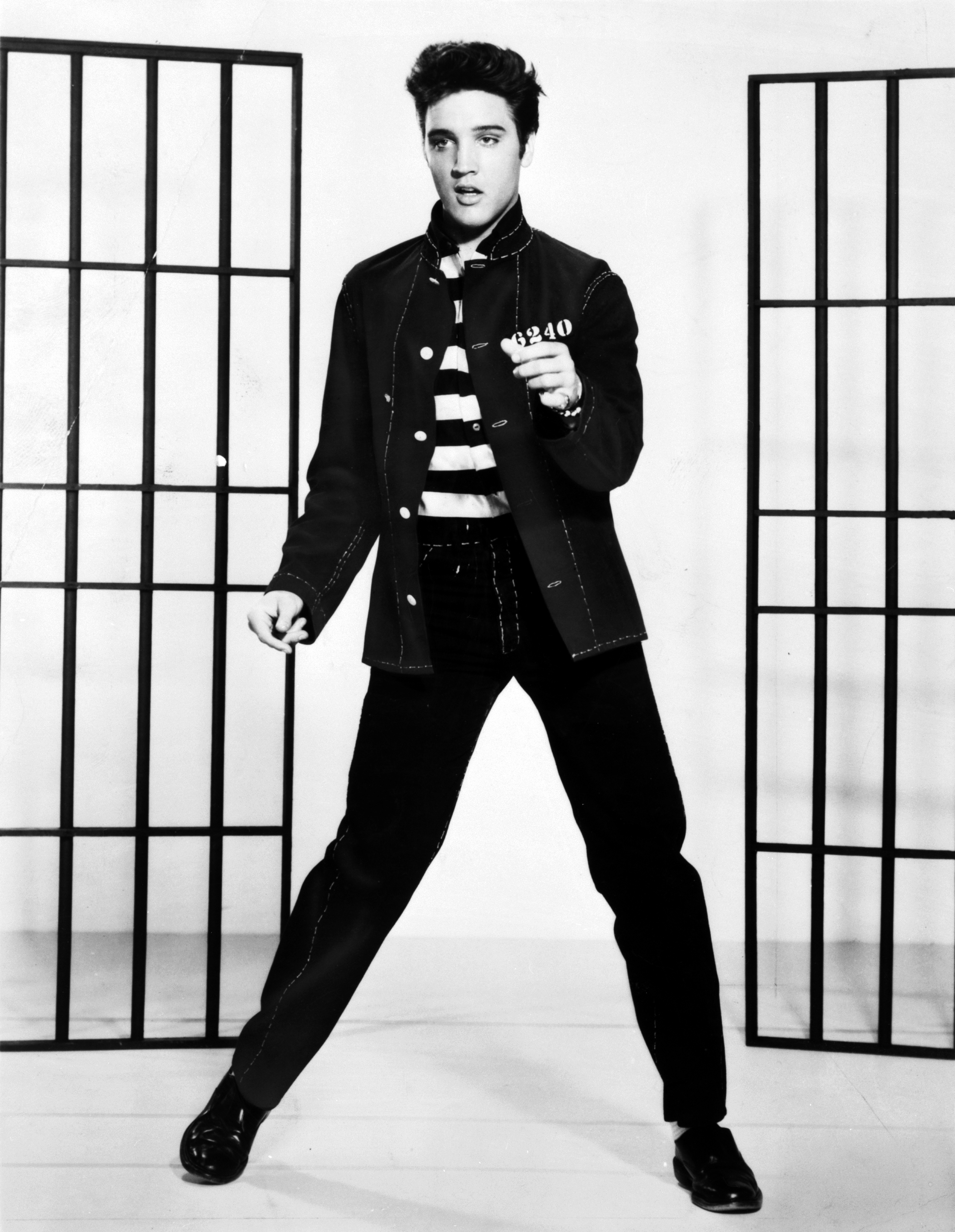
As her eighteenth chart-topper, "Touch My Body", Carey broke Elvis Presley's (picture) record for most number-one hits on the Billboard Hot 100.

After only a few hours worth of airplay, "Touch My Body" entered the Billboard Hot R&B/Hip-Hop Songs Chart at number seventy-eight the chart week of February 23, 2008. In its second week within the chart, it leaped to number twenty, before reaching its peak of number two. In its first complete week of radio airplay, the song garnered 46 million audience impressions, making its debut at number twenty-three on the Billboard Hot 100 Airplay. The week of March 1, 2008 the song made its debut at number fifty-seven on the Billboard Hot 100 as the "Hot Shot" of the week. The following week, "Touch My Body" jumped twenty-three spots to number thirty-four, making it Carey's 31st top-forty hit on the chart. It placed Carey as the woman with the fifth most top-forty entries on the Hot 100 in Billboard history.

"Touch My Body" reached the top position on the Hot 100 in its seventh week, and became Carey's eighteenth chart topper, selling 286,000 digital downloads. The song's opening week broke several records, first making Carey the solo artist with the most number one singles in United States history, surpassing the record held by Elvis Presley. Additionally, it gave Carey her 79th week atop the Hot 100, tying her with Presley as the artist with the most weeks at number one in the Billboard chart history. The song also sold the highest amount of digital records in one week, surpassing Rihanna's "Umbrella" (2007), which sold 277,000 units. In an interview with Fox News, Carey reflected upon breaking Presley's record, as well as her own success: "For me, in my mind the accomplishment is just that much sweeter. In terms of my ethnicity, always feeling like an outsider, always feeling different ... for me it's about saying, 'Thank you Lord, for giving me the faith to believe in myself when other people had written me off.' I've gone through enough of my life worrying about that kind of thing. I want to encourage anyone else out there who feels like maybe they can't overcome an obstacle, I feel like I'm living proof ... never lose your faith. I'm seriously a grateful individual right now".

The following week, the song stayed at number one, and according to Mediabase, received over 400,000 spins in the United States within its second week at number one. By the song's sixth week of digital availability, "Touch My Body" had sold 879,000 units, and was eventually certified 3× Platinum by the Recording Industry Association of America (RIAA), denoting shipments of over three million units throughout the United States. According to Nielsen SoundScan, "Touch My Body" has sold over 1,459,000 copies in the United States as of August 15, 2010. It entered the Canadian Hot 100 at number ninety-seven, based on airplay alone, and peaked at number two. The song also peaked at number two on the Hot Canadian Digital Singles chart, and spent a total of thirteen weeks within the singles chart.

Throughout Australasia and Europe, the song managed to peak within the top five in several countries. In Australia, "Touch My Body" debuted at number twenty on the singles chart, during the week of April 4, 2008. The following week, the song reached its peak of number seventeen, where it spent two weeks, and had a total chart trajectory of ten weeks. "Touch My Body" entered the New Zealand Singles Chart at number eleven, during the week dated March 31, 2008. In total, the song spent two weeks at its peak position of number three, and a total of ten weeks on the chart. On the Japan Hot 100, the song peaked at number two, and the full-length ringtone was certified Gold by the Recording Industry Association of Japan (RIAJ). On the UK Singles Chart, "Touch My Body" debuted at number ninety-nine, from just one day of release. The following week, the song leapt to number six on the chart, before peaking at number five in its third week. In total, "Touch My Body" spent thirteen weeks within the UK charts, and has estimated sales of over 120,000 units.

On April 11, 2008, "Touch My Body" debuted at number forty-five on the Ö3 Austria Top 40 chart. The song peaked at number ten, and fell out of the chart in its tenth week, while it was at fifty-seven. The song achieved moderate success in both the Flemish and Wallonian territories in Belgium, peaking at numbers fourteen and thirty-three, respectively. Making its debut at its peak position of number sixteen, "Touch My Body" charted for a total of nineteen weeks in France, before falling out on October 4, 2008. "Touch My Body" became one of Carey's strongest charting singles in Germany, debuting at number ten on the Media Control Charts. The following week, the song moved up three places to number seven, before completing its ten-week run on the singles chart. On the Dutch Top 40chart, the song made its debut at number twenty-seven. Seven weeks later, the song peaked at number fourteen, before dropping outside the top 40 three weeks later, ending its eleven-week trajectory. In both Norway and Sweden, the song saw moderate success, peaking at numbers ten and fourteen, and lasting on the chart for five and six weeks, respectively. On April 20, 2008, "Touch My Body" debuted and peaked at number three on the Swiss Music Charts, spending a total of twelve weeks on the chart.

== Remixes ==
The official remix, "Touch My Body (Love/Hate Remix)" (aka "Touch My Body (Tricky Remix)"), was produced by Carey, Christopher "Tricky" Stewart and The-Dream, and feature Def Jam labelmate rapper Rick Ross on the first verse and R&B singer The-Dream, who co-produced the song, on the fourth verse. Aside from both their verses, Carey's are intermingled, and featured in between and after both of the male parts. Another official remix was released, featuring a guest rap verse and spoken intro by American rapper Juelz Santana. Another remix, written, produced, and featuring R. Kelly was released to blogs, and available on promo CDs, but not made available on streaming services or for sale. Further remixes were created by Seamus Haji, Craig "Cristyle" Johnson, Subkulcha, and Paul Emanuel

== Music video ==
=== Background ===
The song's music video was directed by film-maker Brett Ratner in Los Angeles, and features 30 Rock's Jack McBrayer. As the pair came up with the video's plot, Ratner contacted McBrayer to play a male leading role, alongside Carey. After receiving the call, McBrayer claimed he was so shocked by the proposal, that he didn't believe it at first. He only met with the producers after Ratner personally called him and assured him the authenticity of the offer. In an interview with MTV News, McBrayer joked "I'm always worried now that somebody is pranking me, so at first I was very leery. But when I heard it was legit, and then later on we got a phone call from Brett Ratner, who directed it. I was like, 'This is either a very elaborate prank, or this is the real deal.'" In the fantasy-themed story, he recalled what he considered the video's most memorable scene, in which he and Carey, dressed in medieval attire, were walking with a unicorn. Additionally, he described the filming process as very simple, as they were given very loose directions and pointers. McBrayer claimed that during one take, they were meant to play Frisbee on the mansion lawn, and he accidentally threw it at Carey's face, jokingly adding "by the time she spins back around — bonk, right in her face. I threw a Frisbee in Mariah Carey's face! I'm like, I'm fired!." In an interview with Reuters, Carey described working with Ratner, and her experience filming the video:

I love Brett because he is like me. If I'm eternally 12 – because he's a little bit more naughty than I am – he's eternally 15. He has a great sense of humor, obviously, and he knows that I have a sense of humor and he feels that people don't recognize that about me. And I'll do stuff that I'm totally joking and they're like (uses mean girl voice), "Why is she doing that? Why is she doing the treadmill with her high heels on?" I'm like, "It's a freakin' joke! It's 'Cribs'! Hello! It's a freakin' joke!"

=== Synopsis ===
Carey is shown at a picnic with the computer employee (McBrayer), as part of his fantasy with her during the music video. As throughout most of the video, Carey is dressed in revealing clothing, due to the song's lyrical content.

The music video revolves around the fantasy of a computer store employee, as he dreams about a relationship with Carey. Throughout the video, the pair is seen to have a pillow fight; play laser tag, Guitar Hero and slot cars; and throw a frisbee. The video also features Carey in various revealing outfits. The video begins with a small Compu Nerd Volkswagen New Beetle, parodying Geek Squad, pulling up into the driveway of Carey's large manor. As the employee introduces himself, Carey asks him to follow her to the broken computer, as she is in a hurry to go somewhere. As he attends to it, Carey removes her robe, and enters her large closet, leaving McBrayer to begin his fantasy with her. The first scene is of Carey wearing a tight pink number, laying seductively on the bed, as the computer employee plays with an electric guitar. He joins her on the bed, and she begins playfully spanking him as the two enter a pillow fight. Another scene is interspersed, of Carey sporting a mini silver dress, with tall socks and heels, flaunting her body. The fantasy then adapts to a new scenery, of the pair dressed in medieval clothing, while walking a unicorn, followed by the duo in a large room in the mansion, racing electronic cars. As they proceed to play laser tag, they are shown outside, laying on a picnic bed, with Carey dressed in a "naughty school girl outfit". They both get up, and begin to throw a frisbee, before relocating in front of the main stairwell in the mansion. The final scenes of the fantasy are of Carey, wearing a shortened red gown, standing atop the staircase, and McBrayer climbing on his knees while carrying flowers. All the scenes begin to fade, with the last being Carey feeding him by hand by the refrigerator, as he wakes up with Carey, now dressed, poking him. She asks the employee if he updated her download speed to 802.11n then tells him that security will let him out when he is finished, leaving him while he is still fantasizing about her.

=== Promotion and reception ===
The music video won in the category of "Best Comedic Video" at the 2008 BET Awards, and won the "MTV Video Vanguard Award" at the 2008 MTV Video Music Awards Japan. Additionally, the video was nominated for "Best Female Video" at the 2008 MTV Video Music Awards in the United States. As the MTV Video Music Award is the only industry award for which Carey has not yet received even one trophy, she jokingly expressed to MTV News her feelings regarding the video for "Touch My Body":

I have faith in my fans. I believe they will come through for me, because they always have. My house is not complete without an American Moonman, and I would say 'Touch My Body' deserves one. Brett Ratner directed it, I have a unicorn in there, I have ['Guitar Hero'] in there — who else has that?"

Carey appeared on several music video programs in promotion for the video's debut. She appeared on MTV's Total Request Live and BET's 106 & Park on February 27, 2008, to premiere the video for "Touch My Body"; BET also played the video all day, every hour on the hour, until 106 & Park aired. VH1 posted a 45-second sneak peek on their blog on February 26, and subsequently posted the video in its entirety at midnight on February 27, 2008.

== Live performances ==
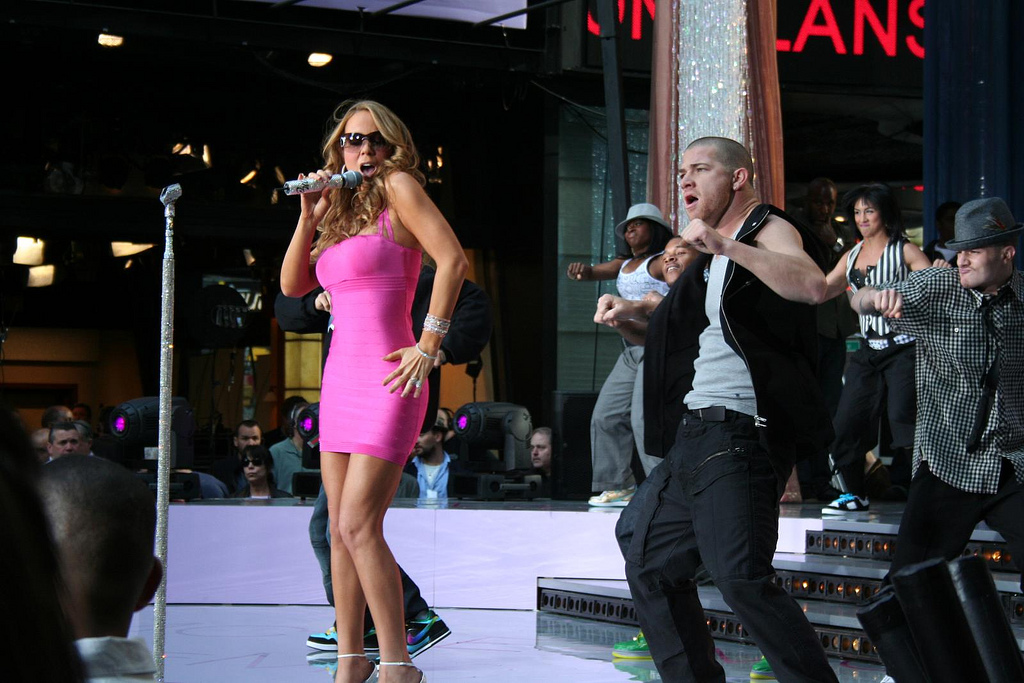
Carey and her dancers performing "Touch My Body" on Good Morning America on April 25, 2008

Following the song's digital release, Carey promoted the song on several live televised appearances and programs throughout the world. Only days prior to being released digitally, Carey was announced as the musical guest on an episode of Saturday Night Live, taking over for Janet Jackson who caught the flu and was unable to perform. Hosted by Jonah Hill, Carey performed both "Touch My Body", as well as live rendition of "Migrate" alongside T-Pain. Following the set, Carey and her manager at the time, Benny Medina, met with Lee Daniels, who then offered Carey a role in his film adaptation of Precious (2008), in which Carey would later star and earn acclaim for her acting. After reaching the top of the Billboard charts, the Empire State Building was lit up in Carey's motif colors, white, pink and lavender, for the entire week. On March 25, 2008, Carey was featured as the special guest performer at The Hills season premiere party, an event marking the start of a span of ten episodes airing in between season three and four. Carey, dressed in a black skirt and gold top, performed "Touch My Body", "I'm That Chick" and "We Belong Together", before exiting the stage to a standing ovation. After the performance, Carey received strong praise from the program's cast members, with Lauren Conrad saying "I've always been a huge Mariah fan, and she's just so beautiful and talented', while Whitney Port and Audrina Patridge referred to Carey as "an amazing singer", while claiming to have listened to her music from a young age.

On April 25, 2008, Carey opened the Good Morning America "Summer Concert Series" with a live performance in Times Square. Carey, wearing a pink mini-skirt, began the set with "Touch My Body" in front of thousands of fans. During the song, Carey's backing vocals began to malfunction, causing it to repeat phrases and play during her main vocal moments. In order to let the sound engineer know of the problem, she substituted part of the lyrics for "stop singing my part now, baby!", and completed the final chorus. She continued on with "I'm That Chick", and completed the three-song set-list with her follow-up single, "Bye Bye". After marking the album's stateside launch with her appearance on Good Morning America, Carey took to Europe to perform on several programs. She began with an interview on the British radio station, BBC Radio 1, and continued onto a live rendition of "Touch My Body" on both The Sunday Night Project and The Paul O'Grady Show. Similarly, Carey performed the song live on the popular German talent show, Deutschland sucht den Superstar (Germany searches for the superstar), in April 2008.

On August 8, 2008, Carey performed a mash-up of the song at the 2008 Teen Choice Awards. She began with her single at the time, "I'll Be Lovin' U Long Time", and worked into the bridge of "Touch My Body", before reverting to the former song. At the Fashion Rocks ceremony in 2009, Carey performed "Touch My Body" and her current single at the time, "Obsessed", as well as the remix to her 1995 song "Fantasy". During the set-list, Carey was accompanied by six men in black ties, who hoisted her into the air in front of over 6,000 people during "Obsessed", and rigorous dance routines throughout "Touch My Body". Following the release of Carey's twelfth studio album Memoirs of an Imperfect Angel (2009), she held four concerts at The Pearl Concert Theatre, where she included the song on the set-list. Similar to the performance at the Fashion Rocks ceremony, Carey was hoisted into the air several times by four to six male dancers, each of whom circled her with intricate dancing throughout the song. Carey featured similar choreography for the song during her Angels Advocate Tour (2009–2010), where it was included throughout the entire span of the tour.

== Cover versions ==
R. Kelly, portraying "The Remix Killer", released an unofficial remix of the song in April 2008. During most of his section of the song, Kelly sings of shining, drinking and two-stepping in a club, and he promises to kiss any place on Mariah's body she wants: "Girl, if you let me, I'm gonna touch it / But if I touch it, I'm gonna wanna hit it." Later, he mimics Carey's bridge: "If some honies up in here that want me to touch her body / Say, 'I-i-i-i do.'" According to Kelly, the remix is unofficial, and his lyrics are freestyle rap.

During a concert in Washington, D.C., soul singer Aretha Franklin performed a live rendition of the song. Following a piano introduction for her song, "The House That Jack Built", Franklin segued into "Touch My Body", and jokingly referred to the lyrics, telling the audience "As far as I'm concerned, what starts on the floor stays on the floor." A writer from Rap-Up commented on the performance, calling it "absolutely priceless". Similarly, a writer from the Chicago Tribune complemented Franklin's live rendition of "Touch My Body", calling it "simple, enjoyable and sweet".

== Track listings and formats ==
US and Australian maxi-single

1. "Touch My Body" (Radio Edit)
2. "Touch My Body" (Remix)
3. "Touch My Body" (Seamus Haji Club Mix)
4. "Touch My Body" (Video)

European 12" Vinyl single

1. "Touch My Body" (Radio Edit)
2. "Touch My Body" (Craig C Radio Edit)
3. "Touch My Body" (Seamus Haji Radio Edit)
4. "Touch My Body" (Instrumental)

Japanese CD single

1. "Touch My Body" (Radio Edit)
2. "Touch My Body" (Remix)
3. "Touch My Body" (Seamus Haji Club Mix)

UK CD single

1. "Touch My Body" (Radio Edit)
2. "Touch My Body" (Seamus Haji Club Mix)

US maxi-Single

1. "Touch My Body" (Seamus Haji & Paul Emanuel Radio Edit)
2. "Touch My Body" (Craig C Radio Edit)
3. "Touch My Body" (Subkulcha Radio Edit)
4. "Touch My Body" (Seamus Haji & Paul Emanuel Club Remix)
5. "Touch My Body" (Craig C Club Mix)
6. "Touch My Body" (Subkulcha Remix)
7. "Touch My Body" (Seamus Haji & Paul Emanuel Dub)
8. "Touch My Body" (Craig C Dub)
9. "Touch My Body" (Remix featuring Juelz Santana)

== Credits and personnel ==
Credits for E=MC² adapted from the album's liner notes.

- Mariah Carey – songwriting, producer, vocals, background vocals
- Terius Nash – songwriting, producer
- Christopher Stewart – songwriting, producer
- Crystal Johnson – songwriting, producer
- David Pensado – audio mixing
- Jaycen Joshua – audio mixing
- Bernie Grundman – mastering

== Charts ==
=== Weekly charts ===
Weekly chart performance for "Touch My Body"
| Chart (2008) | Peak position |
|---|---|
| Australia (ARIA) | 17 |
| Australian Urban (ARIA) | 5 |
| Austria (Ö3 Austria Top 40) | 10 |
| Belgium (Ultratop 50 Flanders) | 14 |
| Belgium (Ultratop 50 Wallonia) | 33 |
| Canada Hot 100 (Billboard) | 2 |
| Canada AC (Billboard) | 40 |
| Canada CHR/Top 40 (Billboard) | 3 |
| Canada Hot AC (Billboard) | 13 |
| CIS Airplay (TopHit) | 144 |
| Croatia International Airplay (HRT) | 3 |
| Czech Republic Airplay (ČNS IFPI) | 19 |
| Denmark (Tracklisten) | 20 |
| European Hot 100 Singles (Billboard) | 3 |
| El Salvador (EFE) | 1 |
| Finland (Suomen virallinen lista) | 21 |
| France (SNEP) | 16 |
| Germany (GfK) | 7 |
| Global Dance Songs (Billboard) | 7 |
| Hungary (Rádiós Top 40) | 19 |
| Ireland (IRMA) | 13 |
| Italy (FIMI) | 5 |
| Japan (Oricon) | 103 |
| Japan (Japan Hot 100) | 5 |
| Latvia (EHR) | 16 |
| Netherlands (Dutch Top 40) | 14 |
| Netherlands (Single Top 100) | 20 |
| New Zealand (Recorded Music NZ) | 3 |
| New Zealand Pop Radio (RadioScope) | 33 |
| New Zealand Urban Radio (RadioScope) | 2 |
| Norway (VG-lista) | 10 |
| Portugal (Billboard) | 10 |
| Romania (Romanian Top 100) | 21 |
| Scottish Singles Sales (Official Charts) | 5 |
| Slovakia Airplay (ČNS IFPI) | 8 |
| Sweden (Sverigetopplistan) | 14 |
| Switzerland (Schweizer Hitparade) | 3 |
| Turkey (Türkiye Top 20) | 6 |
| UK Singles (Official Charts) | 5 |
| UK Hip Hop/R&B (Official Charts) | 1 |
| UK Club (Music Week) | 28 |
| UK Pop Club (Music Week) | 1 |
| UK Urban Club (Music Week) | 3 |
| Ukraine Airplay (TopHit) | 97 |
| US Billboard Hot 100 | 1 |
| US Adult Pop Airplay (Billboard) | 39 |
| US Dance Club Songs (Billboard) | 1 |
| US Dance Airplay (Billboard) | 6 |
| US Dance Singles Sales (Billboard) | 4 |
| US Hot Latin Songs (Billboard) | 40 |
| US Hot R&B/Hip-Hop Songs (Billboard) | 2 |
| US Pop Airplay (Billboard) | 7 |
| US Pop 100 (Billboard) | 1 |
| US Rhythmic Airplay (Billboard) | 3 |
| US Rhythmic (Mediabase) | 3 |
| US Top 40 (Mediabase) | 7 |
| US Urban (Mediabase) | 3 |
| US Urban AC (Mediabase) | 7 |
| Venezuela Anglo (Record Report) | 12 |

=== Year-end charts ===
Year-end chart performance for "Touch My Body"
| Chart (2008) | Position |
|---|---|
| Australian Urban (ARIA) | 31 |
| Brazil (Crowley) | 13 |
| Canada (Canadian Hot 100) | 55 |
| European Hot 100 Singles (Billboard) | 94 |
| Germany (Official German Charts) | 92 |
| Netherlands (Dutch Top 40) | 111 |
| Switzerland (Schweizer Hitparade) | 92 |
| Taiwan (Yearly Singles Top 100) | 22 |
| UK Singles (OCC) | 93 |
| US Billboard Hot 100 | 22 |
| US Dance Club Songs (Billboard) | 21 |
| US Hot R&B/Hip-Hop Songs (Billboard) | 21 |
| US Mainstream Top 40 (Billboard) | 41 |
| US Pop 100 (Billboard) | 48 |
| US Rhythmic (Billboard) | 17 |

== Certifications ==
Certifications and sales for "Touch My Body"
| Region | Certification | Certified units/sales |
|---|---|---|
| Brazil (Pro-Música Brasil) | 2× Platinum | 120,000^{‡} |
| Italy | — | 20,000 |
| Japan (RIAJ) Ringtone | Gold | 100,000^{*} |
| New Zealand (RMNZ) | 2× Platinum | 60,000^{‡} |
| United Kingdom (BPI) | Gold | 400,000^{‡} |
| United States (RIAA) | 3× Platinum | 3,000,000^{‡} |
| United States (RIAA) Mastertone | Platinum | 1,000,000^{*} |
^{*} Sales figures based on certification alone.^{‡} Sales+streaming figures based on certification alone.

== Release history ==
Release dates and formats for "Touch My Body"
| Region | Date | Format(s) | Label(s) | Ref. |
|---|---|---|---|---|
| United States | February 12, 2008 | Digital download; streaming | Island | |
| United States | February 19, 2008 | Contemporary hit radio; rhythmic contemporary radio | Island | |
| United Kingdom | March 17, 2008 | 12-inch vinyl; CD; digital download; maxi CD | Def Jam | |
| Germany | March 28, 2008 | Maxi CD | Universal Music | |
| Ireland | March 30, 2008 | Digital download | Universal Music | |
| Australia | March 31, 2008 | Maxi CD | Universal Music | |
| Belgium | April 1, 2008 | CD | Universal Music | |
| Japan | April 2, 2008 | Maxi CD | Universal Music | |
| United States | April 22, 2008 | 12-inch vinyl | Island | |
| France | May 26, 2008 | CD | Mercury | |
| Various | February 5, 2021 | Digital download; streaming (EP) | Universal Music | |

== See also ==
- List of Billboard Hot 100 number-one singles of 2008
- List of number-one dance singles of 2008 (U.S.)
