= Low (Flo Rida song) =

2007 single by Flo Rida

Single by Flo Rida featuring T-Pain

from the album Mail on Sunday and Step Up 2: The Streets
- B-side: "Birthday"
- Released: October 9, 2007
- Genre: Crunk; Miami bass
- Length: 3:50
- Label: Atlantic; Poe Boy
- Songwriters: Tramar Dillard; Faheem Najm; Montay Humphrey
- Producers: DJ Montay; T-Pain

Flo Rida singles chronology
"Low" (2007)	"Elevator" (2008)

T-Pain singles chronology
"Church" (2007)	"Low" (2007)	"Who the Fuck Is That?" (2007)

"Low" is the debut single by American rapper and singer Flo Rida featuring fellow American rapper and singer T-Pain. Written by both alongside DJ Montay, who produced it with the latter, it is the lead single from the former's debut album Mail on Sunday and the opening track of the soundtrack to the 2008 film Step Up 2: The Streets.

The song was a massive success worldwide and was the longest-running number-one single of 2008 in the United States, spending ten consecutive weeks atop the Billboard Hot 100. With over seven million digital downloads, it has been certified Diamond by the RIAA, and was the most downloaded single of the 2000s decade, measured by paid digital downloads. The song was named third on the Billboard Hot 100 Songs of the Decade.

The song received two nominations at the 51st Annual Grammy Awards: Best Rap/Sung Collaboration and Best Rap Song.

== Composition ==
"Low"
Flo Rida featuring T-Pain's "Low" from Mail on Sunday and Step Up 2: The Streets

"Low" has been described as a danceable hip-hop song, but more specifically crunk and Miami bass. The song features an Eurohouse aesthetic with 808 drum machines such as kick, sub bass, cymbals and handclaps. It has a verse–chorus form while the melody is an arpeggiated ostinato note sequence instead of a chord progression. T-Pain's rely heavily on synthesizers, with him using Auto-Tune and call and answer during the chorus. The song is written in the key of E♭ minor. Set in the time signature of common time, it has a moderate tempo of 128 beats per minute. T-Pain's vocal range spans nearly two octaves from B♭_{2} to F♯_{4}.

Lyrically, the song describes a sexually desirable girl dancing in a club, and the singer's efforts to hook up with her, primarily by flaunting displays of cash. The girl is described in the chorus as wearing "Apple Bottom jeans" and "boots with the fur".

== Commercial performance ==
The song debuted at number 91 on the U.S. Billboard Hot 100 for the week of November 6, 2007, and reached number 1 for the week of December 30, 2007. The song stayed on the Hot 100 for thirty-nine weeks before dropping out in June 2008.

"Low" held the top position longer than any song did in 2008 (see List of Billboard Hot 100 number-one singles of 2008), and was the longest-running Hot 100 number 1 single since Beyoncé's "Irreplaceable". The song is also the longest-running number 1 single in the history of the Billboard Digital Songs chart, topping the chart for thirteen weeks, and also on the now-defunct Pop 100 chart, where it ruled for twelve weeks. For the week of June 29, 2008, it became the first song ever to sell four million digital copies in the US, and then for the week of June 21, 2009, the first to sell over five million copies. It was best-selling digitally-downloaded song until it was surpassed by the Black Eyed Peas' "I Gotta Feeling" in May 2010. The song sold over six million in digital sales by August 7, 2011, and reached its seven millionth sales mark in sales in June 2014.

The physical release of the single occurred in the UK for the week of March 24, 2008. For the week of July 20, 2008, the song moved up to number 19 on the UK Singles Chart, several months after its official release. It spent seventy-five weeks on the chart. As of January 2012, the song has sold 613,434 copies in the UK.

The song was ranked at number 26 on Billboard's All Time Hot 100. The song was also ranked the number 1 song for 2008 in Billboard's ranking of the Billboard Year-End Hot 100 singles of 2008. For the week of December 28, 2008, it was listed at number 11 on the UK Singles Chart year-end countdown and was named the highest-selling single in Australia in 2008. The song was a hit in Europe, reaching the Top 10 in Finland, Denmark and Belgium, and the Top 40 in Germany, Hungary, Norway and France.

== Music video ==
The music video of "Low" was directed by Bernard Gourley and contains certain clips from Step Up 2: The Streets. It also contains cameos from Rick Ross, DJ Khaled, Cool & Dre, Briana Evigan, Torch and Gunplay of Triple C's and Jermaine Dupri. Also, T-Pain and Flo Rida are in a nightclub in a few scenes. The music video reached the top spot on MTV Jams for five days, and for twenty-two days on TRL. The music video was also nominated at the 2008 MTV Video Music Awards for Best Male Video and Best Hip-Hop Video, but lost to Hurricane Chris' "Playas Rock" (Best Male Video) and Birdman's "Pop Bottles" (Best Hip-Hop Video) music videos.

== Track listing ==
European CD single

1. "Low" – 3:53
2. "Low" (Travis Barker Remix) – 4:15

Europe maxi-CD

1. "Low" – 3:53
2. "Low" (Instrumental) – 3:53
3. "Birthday" (Amended Version)
4. "Low" (Video)

71 Digits x Flo Rida - Digital download

1. "Low" (71 Digits Version) – 2:15
2. "Low" (71 Digits Extended Edit) – 3:30

== Charts ==
=== Weekly charts ===
Chart (2007–2008)	Peak position
Australia (ARIA)	1
Australian Urban (ARIA)	1
Austria (Ö3 Austria Top 40)	9
Belgium (Ultratop 50 Flanders)	7
Belgium (Ultratop 50 Wallonia)	24
Canada Hot 100 (Billboard)	1
Canada CHR/Top 40 (Billboard)	1
Canada Hot AC (Billboard)	32
Czech Republic Airplay (ČNS IFPI)	12
Denmark (Tracklisten)	9
Europe (Eurochart Hot 100)	3
Finland (Suomen virallinen lista)	9
France (SNEP)	4
France (SNEP)	33
Germany (GfK)	13
Hungary (Dance Top 40)	19
Hungary (Rádiós Top 40)	14
Hungary (Single Top 40)	2
Ireland (IRMA)	1
Netherlands (Single Top 100)	55
New Zealand (Recorded Music NZ)	1
Norway (VG-lista)	12
Scottish Singles Sales (Official Charts)	2
Slovakia Airplay (ČNS IFPI)	19
Sweden (Sverigetopplistan)	17
Switzerland (Schweizer Hitparade)	13
UK Singles (Official Charts)	2
UK Hip Hop/R&B (Official Charts)	2
US Billboard Hot 100	1
US Hot R&B/Hip-Hop Songs (Billboard)	9
US Hot Rap Songs (Billboard)	1
US Pop Airplay (Billboard)	1
US Rhythmic Airplay (Billboard)	1

=== Year-end charts ===
Chart (2008)	Position
Australia (ARIA)	1
Austria (Ö3 Austria Top 40)	38
Belgium (Ultratop 50 Flanders)	20
Belgium (Ultratop 50 Wallonia)	87
Brazil (Crowley)	24
Canada (Canadian Hot 100)	3
Canada CHR/Top 40 (Billboard)	5
Europe (Eurochart Hot 100)	25
Germany (Media Control GfK)	54
Hungary (Dance Top 40)	70
Hungary (Rádiós Top 40)	22
New Zealand (RIANZ)	2
Sweden (Sverigetopplistan)	78
Switzerland (Schweizer Hitparade)	50
UK Singles (OCC)	11
UK Urban (Music Week)	1
US Billboard Hot 100	1
US Hot R&B/Hip-Hop Songs (Billboard)	40
US Mainstream Top 40 (Billboard)	1
US Rhythmic Airplay (Billboard)	1
Worldwide (IFPI)	3

Chart (2009)	Position
Hungary (Dance Top 40)	114
UK Singles (OCC)	148

=== Decade-end charts ===
Chart (2000–2009)	Position
Australia (ARIA)	13
UK Singles (OCC)	81
US Billboard Hot 100	3

=== All-time charts ===
Chart (1958–2018)	Position
US Billboard Hot 100	28

== Certifications ==
Region	Certification	Certified units/sales
Australia (ARIA)	3× Platinum	210,000^{^}
Canada (Music Canada)	5× Platinum	400,000^{‡}
Canada (Music Canada) Ringtone	5× Platinum	200,000^{*}
Denmark (IFPI Danmark)	2× Platinum	180,000^{‡}
Germany (BVMI)	5× Gold	750,000^{‡}
Italy (FIMI)	Gold	35,000^{‡}
Japan (RIAJ)	Platinum	250,000^{*}
New Zealand (RMNZ)	7× Platinum	210,000^{‡}
Spain (Promusicae)	Gold	30,000^{‡}
Switzerland (IFPI Switzerland)	Platinum	30,000^{^}
United Kingdom (BPI)	4× Platinum	2,400,000^{‡}
United States (RIAA)	Diamond	10,000,000^{‡}
United States (RIAA) Mastertone	3× Platinum	3,000,000^{*}
^{*} Sales figures based on certification alone.^{^} Shipments figures based on certification alone.^{‡} Sales+streaming figures based on certification alone.

== Cover versions and media usage ==
In 2020, the American grocery chain Kroger and their subsidiary stores began to use the song's chorus for a series of animated ads, highlighting coupons and low prices.

At the start of 2021, the ads became a minor Internet meme with user-generated YouTube and TikTok remixes.

A parody of the song highlighting price drop was used in the 2021 Lazada 11.11 TV commercial featuring K-Pop boy group Seventeen in the ASEAN region, where it was sung in Indonesian, Tagalog, Thai, Vietnamese, and English.

In 2026, Dutch DJ Hardwell released a reworked version of the song in collaboration with Dr Phunk and Azteck, through his label Revealed Recordings. The version retains elements of the original composition while featuring newly recorded vocals.
