= List of awards and nominations received by Lil Wayne =

Lil Wayne awards and nominations
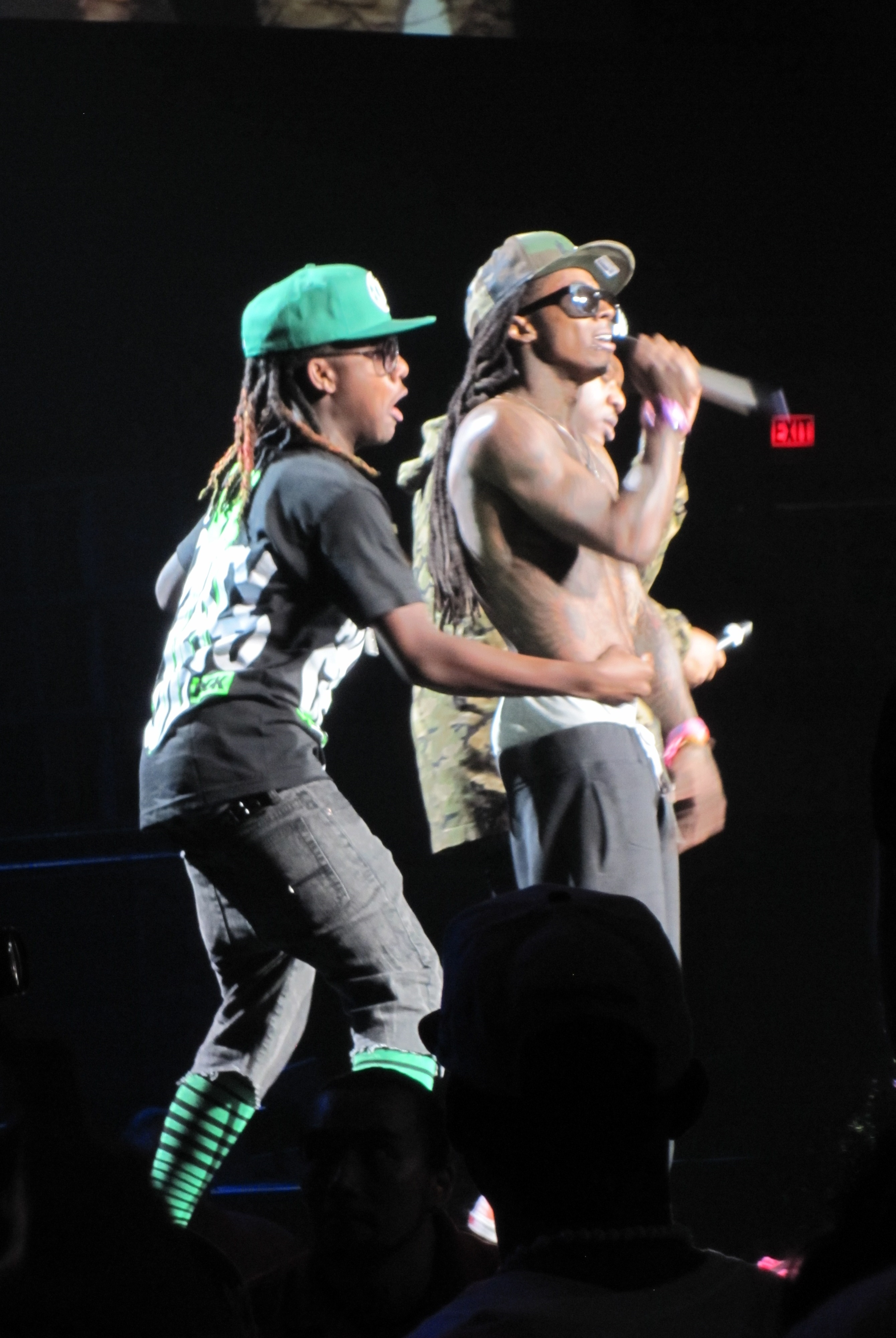
- Lil Wayne (right) performing in 2011
Awards and nominations
Award	Wins	Nominations
Grammy Awards	5	24
Billboard Music Awards	4	9
MTV Video Music Awards	2	13
BET Awards	11	33
BET Hip Hop Awards	16	52
American Music Awards	1	8
Soul Train Music Awards	4	12

Totals (Note: Certain award groups do not simply award one winner. They acknowledge several different recipients, have runners-up, and have third place. Since this is a specific recognition and is different from losing an award, runner-up mentions are considered wins in this award tally. For simplification and to avoid errors, each award in this list has been presumed to have had a prior nomination.)
- Wins: 188
- Nominations: 256

This is a list of awards and nominations received by Lil Wayne.

== American Music Awards ==
The American Music Awards is an annual award ceremony created by Dick Clark in 1974. Lil Wayne received eight nominations and won once in 2017.

Year	Nominee / work	Award	Result
2008	Lil Wayne	Favorite Male Hip-Hop/Rap Artist	Nominated
2008	Tha Carter III	Favorite Hip-Hop/Rap Album	Nominated
2011	Lil Wayne	Artist of the Year	Nominated
2011	Lil Wayne	Favorite Rap/Hip-Hop Artist	Nominated
2011	Tha Carter IV	Favorite Rap/Hip-Hop Album	Nominated
2013	Lil Wayne	Favorite Rap/Hip-Hop Artist	Nominated
2017	"I'm the One" (with DJ Khaled, Quavo, Chance the Rapper, & Lil Wayne)	Favorite Rap/Hip-Hop Song	Won
2017	"I'm the One" (with DJ Khaled, Quavo, Chance the Rapper, & Lil Wayne)	Collaboration of the Year	Nominated

== Berlin Music Video Awards ==
Year	Nominee / work	Award	Result
2023	Mona Lisa ft. Kendrick Lamar	Best Animation	Nominated

== BET Awards ==
Year	Nominee / work	Award	Result
2004	"Soldier" (with Destiny's Child & T.I.)	Best Collaboration	Nominated
2007	Lil Wayne	Best Male Hip Hop Artist	Nominated
2007	"Stuntin' Like My Daddy" (with Birdman)	Viewer's Choice Award	Won
2008	Lil Wayne	Best Male Hip-Hop Artist	Nominated
2008	"I'm So Hood (remix)" (with DJ Khaled, Ludacris, Busta Rhymes, Big Boi, Young Jeezy, Fat Joe, Birdman & Rick Ross)	Best Collaboration	Nominated
2008	"Lollipop" (with Static Major)	Viewer's Choice Award	Won
2009	Lil Wayne	Best Male Hip-Hop Artist	Won
2009	"Turnin' Me On" (with Keri Hilson)	Best Collaboration	Won
2009	"Turnin' Me On" (with Keri Hilson)	Viewer's Choice Award	Nominated
2009	"Can't Believe It" (with T-Pain)	Viewer's Choice Award	Won
2009	"A Milli"	Viewer's Choice Award	Nominated
2010	Young Money	Best New Artist	Nominated
2010	Young Money	Best Group	Won
2010	"Forever" (with Drake, Eminem, Kanye West)	Best Collaboration	Nominated
2010	Bedrock	Viewer's Choice Award	Nominated
2011	Lil Wayne	Best Hip Hop Artist	Nominated
2011	"Look at Me Now" (with Chris Brown & Busta Rhymes)	Video of the Year	Won
2011	"Look at Me Now" (with Chris Brown & Busta Rhymes)	Best Collaboration	Won
2011	"Look at Me Now" (with Chris Brown & Busta Rhymes)	Viewer's Choice Award	Won
2011	"6 Foot 7 Foot" (with Cory Gunz)	Viewer's Choice Award	Nominated
2012	Lil Wayne	Best Hip Hop Artist	Nominated
2012	Lil Wayne	FANdemonium Award	Nominated
2012	"I'm On One" (with DJ Khaled, Rick Ross & Drake)	Best Collaboration	Nominated
2012	"The Motto" (with Drake and Tyga)	Best Collaboration	Nominated
2012	"The Motto" (with Drake and Tyga)	Viewer's Choice	Nominated
2013	HYFR (with Drake)	Video of the Year	Nominated
2013	Pop That (with French Montana, Rick Ross & Drake)	Best Collaboration	Nominated
2015	Loyal (with Chris Brown & Tyga)	Video of the Year	Nominated
2015	Loyal (with Chris Brown & Tyga)	Best Collaboration	Nominated
2015	Only (with Nicki Minaj, Drake & Chris Brown)	Viewers' Choice Award	Won
2016	2 Chainz & Lil Wayne	Best Duo/Group	Nominated
2017	2 Chainz & Lil Wayne	Best Duo/Group	Nominated
2017	"No Problem" (with Chance the Rapper & 2 Chainz)	Best Collaboration	Won
2021	"Whats Poppin (Remix)" (with Jack Harlow, DaBaby & Tory Lanez)	Best Collaboration	Nominated

== BET Hip Hop Awards ==
Year	Nominee / work	Award	Result	Ref.
2007	Lil Wayne	Best Live Performance	Nominated	
2007	Lil Wayne	Lyricist of the Year	Nominated	
2007	"We Takin' Over" (with DJ Khaled, Akon, T.I., Rick Ross, Fat Joe, & Birdman)	Alltel People's Champ Award	Nominated	
2007	"We Takin' Over" (with DJ Khaled, Akon, T.I., Rick Ross, Fat Joe, & Birdman)	Best Hip Hop Collabo	Nominated	
2007	"Stuntin' Like My Daddy" with (with Birdman)	Best Hip Hop Collabo	Nominated	
2007	"Stuntin' Like My Daddy" with (with Birdman)	Alltel People's Champ Award	Won	
2008	Lil Wayne	Hustler of the Year	Nominated	
2008	Lil Wayne	MVP of the Year	Won	
2008	Lil Wayne	Lyricist of the Year	Won	
2008	Lil Wayne	Best Live Performer	Nominated	
2008	Tha Carter III	CD of the Year	Won	
2008	"A Milli"	Alltel Wireless People's Champ Award	Won	
2008	"Lollipop" (featuring Static Major)	Hottest Hip Hop Ringtone of the Year	Won	
2008	"Lollipop" (featuring Static Major)	Best Hip-Hop Video	Nominated	
2008	"I'm So Hood (Remix)" (with DJ Khaled, Young Jeezy, Ludacris, Busta Rhymes, Big Boi, Fat Joe, Birdman & Rick Ross)	Best Hip-Hop Video	Nominated	
2008	"I'm So Hood (Remix)" (with DJ Khaled, Young Jeezy, Ludacris, Busta Rhymes, Big Boi, Fat Joe, Birdman & Rick Ross)	Best Hip-Hop Collabo	Won	
2009	Lil Wayne	Best Live Performer	Nominated	
2009	Lil Wayne	Lyricist of the Year	Nominated	
2009	Lil Wayne	MVP of the Year	Nominated	
2009	Lil Wayne	Hustler of the Year	Nominated	
2009	Lil Wayne	Best Hip Hop Style	Nominated	
2009	"Mrs. Officer" (featuring Bobby Valentino)	Best Hip Hop Collabo	Nominated	
2010	Lil Wayne	Lyricist of the Year	Nominated	
2010	Lil Wayne	Best Live Performer	Nominated	
2010	"Forever" (with Drake, Kanye West, Eminem)	Reese's Perfect Combo Award	Nominated	
2011	Lil Wayne	Hustler of the Year	Nominated	
2011	Lil Wayne	MVP Of The Year	Nominated	
2011	Lil Wayne	Lyricist of the Year	Won	
2011	Lil Wayne	Best Live Performer	Won	
2011	Lil Wayne	Made You Look Award	Nominated	
2011	"Motivation"	Sweet 16: Best Featured Verse	Nominated	
2011	"6 Foot 7 Foot" (featuring Cory Gunz)	Best Club Banger	Nominated	
2011	"6 Foot 7 Foot" (featuring Cory Gunz)	Verizon People's Champ Award	Nominated	
2011	"I'm on One" (with DJ Khaled, Drake & Rick Ross)	Best Hip Hop Video	Nominated	
2011	"I'm on One" (with DJ Khaled, Drake & Rick Ross)	Best Club Banger	Nominated	
2011	"I'm on One" (with DJ Khaled, Drake & Rick Ross)	Reese's Perfect Combo Award	Nominated	
2011	"Hustle Hard (Remix)" (with Ace Hood & Rick Ross)	Reese's Perfect Combo Award	Nominated	
2011	"Look at Me Now" (with Chris Brown & Busta Rhymes)	Reese's Perfect Combo Award	Won	
2011	"Look at Me Now" (with Chris Brown & Busta Rhymes)	Best Hip Hop Video	Won	
2011	"Look at Me Now" (with Chris Brown & Busta Rhymes)	Verizon People's Champ Award	Won	
2012	"HYFR (Hell Ya Fucking Right)" (with Drake)	Best Hip Hop Video	Won	
2012	"The Motto (Remix)" (with Drake & Tyga)	Reese's Perfect Combo Award	Nominated	
2012	"The Motto (Remix)" (with Drake & Tyga)	Best Club Banger	Nominated	
2012	Lil Wayne	Hustler of the Year	Nominated	
2013	"Pop That" (with French Montana, Rick Ross & Drake)	Reese's Perfect Combo Award	Nominated	
2013	"Pop That" (with French Montana, Rick Ross & Drake)	Best Club Banger	Won	
2014	"My Hitta (Remix)" (with YG, Nicki Minaj, Meek Mill & Rich Homie Quan)	People's Champ Award	Nominated	
2015	Sorry 4 the Wait 2	Best Mixtape	Nominated	
2015	"Truffle Butter" (with Nicki Minaj & Drake)	Sweet 16: Best Featured Verse	Nominated	
2015	"Truffle Butter" (with Nicki Minaj & Drake)	Best Collabo, Duo or Group	Nominated	
2018	Lil Wayne	I Am Hip Hop Award	Won	
2018	"Dedication 6: Reloaded"	Best Mixtape	Nominated	
2021	"Whats Poppin (Remix)" (Jack Harlow, Tory Lanez & DaBaby)	Best Collaboration	Nominated	

== Billboard Music Awards ==
Year	Nominee / work	Award	Result
2011	Lil Wayne	Top Rap Artist	Nominated
2011	I Am Not a Human Being	Top Rap Album	Nominated
2012	Lil Wayne	Top Artist	Nominated
2012	Lil Wayne	Best Male Artist	Won
2012	Lil Wayne	Best Rap Artist	Won
2012	Lil Wayne	Top Streaming Artist	Nominated
2012	Tha Carter IV	Best Rap Album	Won
2012	"Motivation"(with Kelly Rowland)	Best R&B Song	Won
2015	"Loyal"	Top R&B Song	Nominated

== BMI Awards ==
Lil Wayne has won 53 BMI Awards

Year	Nominee / work	Award	Result
2009	Lil Wayne	Urban Songwriter of the Year	Won
2010	Best I Ever Had	Most Performed Urban Song of the Year	Won
2010	Every Girl	Most Performed Urban Song of the Year	Won
2010	Forever	Most Performed Urban Song of the Year	Nominated
2010	My Life	Most Performed Urban Song of the Year	Won
2010	Successful	Most Performed Urban Song of the Year	Won
2010	Turnin Me On	Most Performed Urban Song of the Year	Won
2010	Lil Wayne	Urban Songwriter of the Year	Won
2019	In My Feelings	Most Performed R&B/Hip-Hop Songs	Won

== Grammy Awards ==
The Grammy Awards are awarded annually by the National Academy of Recording Arts and Sciences. Lil Wayne has won five from twenty-six nominations.

Year	Nominee / work	Award	Result
2006	"Soldier" (with Destiny's Child & T.I.)	Best Rap/Sung Collaboration	Nominated
2008	"Make It Rain" (with Fat Joe)	Best Rap Performance by a Duo or Group	Nominated
2008	Graduation (as featured artist)	Album of the Year	Nominated
2009	Tha Carter III	Album of the Year	Nominated
2009	Tha Carter III	Best Rap Album	Won
2009	"A Milli"	Best Rap Solo Performance	Won
2009	"Lollipop" (with Static Major)	Best Rap Song	Won
2009	"Swagga Like Us" (with T.I., Jay-Z & Kanye West)	Best Rap Song	Nominated
2009	"Swagga Like Us" (with T.I., Jay-Z & Kanye West)	Best Rap Performance by a Duo or Group	Won
2009	"Mr. Carter" (with Jay-Z)	Best Rap Performance by a Duo or Group	Nominated
2009	"Got Money" (with T-Pain)	Best Rap/Sung Collaboration	Nominated
2010	"Best I Ever Had" (as songwriter)	Best Rap Song	Nominated
2011	Recovery (as featured artist)	Album of the Year	Nominated
2012	Tha Carter IV	Best Rap Album	Nominated
2012	"Motivation" (with Kelly Rowland)	Best Rap/Sung Collaboration	Nominated
2012	"I'm On One" (with DJ Khaled, Drake & Rick Ross)	Best Rap/Sung Collaboration	Nominated
2012	"Look at Me Now" (with Chris Brown & Busta Rhymes)	Best Rap Song	Nominated
2012	"Look at Me Now" (with Chris Brown & Busta Rhymes)	Best Rap Performance	Nominated
2013	"HYFR (Hell Ya Fucking Right)" (with Drake)	Best Rap Performance	Nominated
2013	"The Motto" (with Drake)	Best Rap Song	Nominated
2016	"Only" (with Nicki Minaj, Drake & Chris Brown)	Best Rap/Sung Collaboration	Nominated
2016	"Truffle Butter" (with Nicki Minaj & Drake)	Best Rap Performance	Nominated
2017	"No Problem" (with Chance the Rapper & 2 Chainz)	Best Rap Performance	Won
2017	"No Problem" (with Chance the Rapper & 2 Chainz)	Best Rap Song	Nominated
2023	"God Did" (with DJ Khaled, Rick Ross, Jay-Z, John Legend, and Fridayy)	Song of the Year	Nominated
2023	"God Did" (with DJ Khaled, Rick Ross, Jay-Z, John Legend, and Fridayy)	Best Rap Performance	Nominated
2023	"God Did" (with DJ Khaled, Rick Ross, Jay-Z, John Legend, and Fridayy)	Best Rap Song	Nominated
2023	Lil Wayne	Global Impact Award	Honored
2026	"Sticky" (with Tyler, the Creator, GloRilla and Sexyy Red)	Best Rap Song	Nominated

== Hollywood Music in Media Awards ==
Year	Nominee / work	Award	Result
2016	"Sucker for Pain"	Best Original Song – Sci-Fi/Fantasy Film	Nominated

== iHeartRadio Music Awards ==
Year	Nominee / work	Award	Result
2016	"Truffle Butter" (with Nicki Minaj and Drake)	Hip-Hop Song of the Year	Nominated

== International Dance Music Awards ==
Year	Nominee / work	Award	Result
2016	"Truffle Butter" (with Nicki Minaj and Drake)	Hip-Hop Song of the Year	Nominated

== Juno Awards ==
Year	Nominee / work	Award	Result
2013	"HYFR" (with Drake)	Video of the Year	Won

== MOBO Awards ==
The MOBO Awards is an annual awards ceremony established in 1996 by Kanya King to recognize music artist on any race. Lil Wayne received one award from two nominations.

Year	Nominee / work	Award	Result
2008	Lil Wayne	Best Hip-Hop	Won
2010	Lil Wayne	Best International Act	Nominated

== MTV Video Music Award ==
Year	Nominee / work	Award	Result
2005	"Soldier" (with Destiny's Child and T.I.)	Best Group Video	Nominated
2006	"Fireman"	MTV2 Award	Nominated
2008	"Lollipop"	Best Male Video	Nominated
2008	"Lollipop"	Best Hip Hop Video	Won
2010	"Forever" with Drake, Kanye West and Eminem	Best Hip Hop Video	Nominated
2011	"6 Foot 7 Foot" with Cory Gunz	Best Hip Hop Video	Nominated
2011	"Look at Me Now" (with Chris Brown and Busta Rhymes)	Best Hip Hop Video	Nominated
2011	"Look at Me Now" (with Chris Brown and Busta Rhymes)	Best Collaboration	Nominated
2012	"HYFR" (with Drake)	Best Hip Hop Video	Won
2012	"How To Love"	Best Video with a Message	Nominated
2014	"Loyal" (with Chris Brown and Tyga)	Best Collaboration	Nominated
2016	"Let Me Love You" (with Ariana Grande)	Best Collaboration	Nominated
2017	"I'm the One" (with DJ Khaled, Justin Bieber, Quavo and Chance the Rapper)	Best Hip Hop Video	Nominated
2023	“Kant Nobody (with DMX)	Best Hip Hop Video	Nominated

== MTV Europe Music Award ==
Year	Nominee / work	Award	Result
2008	Lil Wayne	Best Urban Artist	Nominated
2008	Lil Wayne	Artist Choice	Won
2010	Lil Wayne	Best Hip-Hop	Nominated
2011	Lil Wayne	Best Hip-Hop	Nominated
2011	Lil Wayne	Best North American Act	Nominated

== MTV2 Sucker Free Summit Awards ==
Year	Nominee / work	Award	Result
2010	"Always Strapped (Remix)" with Birdman, Rick Ross, Young Jeezy	Remix of the Year	Nominated
2010	"Drop The World" with Eminem	The People's Crown	Won
2010	"Forever" with Drake, Eminem, Kanye West	Instant Classic	Nominated
2010	"I'm Single"	Guerilla Video of the Year	Nominated
2010	"No Ceilings"	Mixtape of the Year	Won
2010	"Roger That" with Young Money	The People's Crown	Nominated
2010	"Roger That" with Young Money	Verse of the Year	Won
2011	YMCMB	Best Crew	Won

== MuchMusic Video Awards ==
Year	Nominee / work	Award	Result
2010	"Forever" (with Drake, Eminem, Kanye West)	YOUR FAVE Video	Nominated
2010	"Forever" (with Drake, Eminem, Kanye West)	International Video of the Year by a Canadian	Nominated
2010	"Bedrock" (with Young Money and Lloyd )	International Video of the Year – Group	Nominated
2011	"Miss Me" (with Drake)	Most Watched Video of the Year	Nominated
2011	"No Love" (with Eminem )	Most Watched Video of the Year	Nominated
2012	"The Motto" (with Drake and Tyga)	MuchVibe Best Rap Video	Won

== NAACP Image Awards ==
Year	Nominee / work	Award	Result
2017	"Mad" (with Solange Knowles)	Outstanding Duo or Group	Nominated

== Ozone Awards ==
Year	Nominee / work	Award	Result
2007	Lil Wayne	Mixtape Monster Award	Won
2007	Lil Wayne	Best Lyricist	Won
2007	Lil Wayne	Best Male Rap Artist	Won
2007	"You" (with Lloyd)	Best Rap/R&B Collaboration	Nominated
2007	"We Takin' Over" (with DJ Khaled, T.I., Akon, Rick Ross, Fat Joe, & Birdman)	Best Video	Won
2008	Lil Wayne	Best Lyricist	Won
2008	Lil Wayne	Best Rap Artist	Won
2008	Lil Wayne	Pimp C Award	Nominated
2008	Lil Wayne	Mixtape Monster Award	Nominated
2008	Lil Wayne	TJ's DJ's Hustler Award	Nominated
2008	Birdman	Best Rap Group	Won
2008	"Lollipop" (with Static Major)	Club Banger of the Year	Won
2008	"Duffle Bag Boy" (with Playaz Circle)	Club Banger of the Year	Nominated

== People's Choice Awards ==
Year	Nominee / work	Award	Result
2014	Lil Wayne	Favorite Hip-Hop Artist	Nominated

== Soul Train Music Awards ==
Year	Nominee / work	Award	Result
2009	"Turnin Me On" (with Keri Hilson)	Song of The Year	Nominated
2011	"Motivation" (with Kelly Rowland)	Song of The Year	Won
2011	"Motivation" (with Kelly Rowland)	Best Dance Performance	Nominated
2011	"Look at Me Now" (with Chris Brown)	Best Hip-Hop Song of The Year	Nominated
2013	"High School" (with Nicki Minaj)	Best Hip-Hop Song of The Year	Nominated
2014	"Loyal" (with Chris Brown)	Best Hip-Hop Song of The Year	Won
2014	"Loyal" (with Chris Brown)	Song of The Year	Nominated
2014	"Loyal" (with Chris Brown)	Best Dance Performance	Won
2014	"Loyal" (with Chris Brown)	Best Collaboration	Won
2015	"Truffle Butter" (with Nicki Minaj and Drake)	Best Hip-Hop Song of The Year	Nominated
2016	"No Problem" (featuring Chance the Rapper and 2 Chainz)	Rhythm & Bars Award	Nominated
2016	"No Problem" (featuring Chance the Rapper and 2 Chainz)	Best Collaboration	Nominated

== Source Awards ==
Year	Nominee / work	Award	Result
2000	Lil Wayne	Best New Artist	Won

== Teen Choice Awards ==
Year	Nominee / work	Award	Result
2005	"Soldier"	Choice Music: R&B/Hip-Hop Track	Nominated
2008	Lil Wayne	Choice Music: Rap Artist	Won
2010	Young Money	Choice Music: Best Group	Nominated
2018	"I'm the One" (with DJ Khaled, Quavo, Chance the Rapper and Lil Wayne)	Choice Music: R&B/Hip-Hop Song	Won

== Vibe Music Awards ==
Year	Nominee / work	Award	Result
2005	"Soldier" (with Destiny's Child & T.I.)	Coolest Collabo	Nominated
2007	Lil Wayne	Best Rapper	Won
2007	"Da Drought III"	Best Mixtape of the Year	Won
2007	"We Takin' Over" (with DJ Khaled, T.I., Akon, Rick Ross, Fat Joe, & Birdman)	Coolest Collabo	Won

== World Music Awards ==
Year	Nominee / work	Award	Result
2008	Lil Wayne	World's Best Selling Hip-Hop Artist	Won

== Other accolades ==
- "Hottest MC in the Game"
  - 2011: No. 5 Hottest MC
  - 2010: No. 7 Hottest MC
  - 2009: No. 2 Hottest MC
  - 2008: No. 3 Hottest MC
  - 2007: No. 1 Hottest MC
- "Hip Hop's Iconic Game Changer Award 2012"
- In November 2024, Lil Wayne, during the Lil WeezyAna Fest, received a key to the city from New Orleans Mayor LaToya Cantrell. In the same tribute, Master P announced the creation of the NOLA Walk of Fame and presented Wayne with a fleur-de-lis plaque to mark this honor. Additionally, February 6-7 will now be celebrated as "Lil Wayne Day" in New Orleans.
