= 51st Annual Grammy Awards =

2009 American music award ceremony

- Date: February 8, 2009
- Location: Staples Center, Los Angeles
- Most awards: Alison Krauss, Robert Plant (5)
- Most nominations: Lil Wayne (8)
- Website: https://www.grammy.com/awards/51st-annual-grammy-awards

Television/radio coverage
- Network: CBS

The 51st Annual Grammy Awards took place at the Staples Center in Los Angeles, on February 8, 2009, honoring the best in music for the recording year beginning October 1, 2007, through September 30, 2008. Neil Diamond was honored as the 2009 MusiCares Person of the Year on February 6, two days prior to the Grammy telecast.

Lil Wayne received the most nominations, with eight. Robert Plant and Alison Krauss were the biggest winners of the night, winning five awards, including Album of the Year for their critically acclaimed album Raising Sand. Krauss became the sixth female solo artist to have won 5 awards in one night, joining Lauryn Hill, Alicia Keys, Norah Jones, Beyoncé and Amy Winehouse.

The awards broadcast won an Emmy for Outstanding Sound Mixing for a Variety Series or Special.

== Performances ==
The following performed:

Performer(s)	Song(s) Performed
U2	"Get on Your Boots"
Al Green; Justin Timberlake; Keith Urban; Boyz II Men	"Let's Stay Together"
Coldplay; Jay-Z	"Lost!" "Viva La Vida"
Carrie Underwood	"Last Name"
Kid Rock	"Amen" "All Summer Long" "Rock 'n' Roll Jesus"
Taylor Swift; Miley Cyrus	"Fifteen"
Jennifer Hudson	"You Pulled Me Through"
Jonas Brothers; Stevie Wonder	"Burnin' Up" "Superstition"
Katy Perry	"I Kissed a Girl"
Estelle; Kanye West	"American Boy"
Kenny Chesney	"Better as a Memory"
T.I. Jay-Z; Lil Wayne; Kanye West; M.I.A.	"Swagga Like Us" "Paper Planes"
Paul McCartney; Dave Grohl	"I Saw Her Standing There"
Sugarland	"Stay"
Adele; Jennifer Nettles	"Chasing Pavements"
Radiohead; Spirit of Troy	"15 Step"
T.I. Justin Timberlake	"Dead and Gone"
Duke Fair; Jamie Foxx; Ne-Yo; Smokey Robinson	Tribute to Four Tops "Reach Out I'll Be There" "Standing In the Shadows of Love" "I Can't Help Myself (Sugar Pie Honey Bunch)"
Neil Diamond	"Sweet Caroline"
John Mayer; B.B. King; Buddy Guy; Keith Urban	Tribute to Bo Diddley "Bo Diddley"
Lil Wayne; Robin Thicke; Terence Blanchard; Allen Toussaint	Tribute to New Orleans and Hurricane Katrina "Tie My Hands"
Robert Plant; Alison Krauss	"Rich Woman" "Gone, Gone, Gone (Done Moved On)"
Stevie Wonder	"All About the Love Again"

Notes

- Both Rihanna and Chris Brown were scheduled to perform, but their performances were canceled after Brown was arrested after their fight.

== Presenters ==
The following presented:

- Whitney Houston – presented Best R&B Album.
- Dwayne Johnson – introduced Justin Timberlake.
- Simon Baker – introduced Coldplay.
- Keith Urban – paid tribute to Gene Autry as a Lifetime Achievement recipient and introduced Carrie Underwood.
- Leann Rimes and Sheryl Crow – paid tribute to Brenda Lee as a Lifetime Achievement recipient and presented Best Country Performance by a Duo or Group with Vocals
- Duffy and Al Green – presented Song of the Year.
- Miley Cyrus and Taylor Swift – presented Best Pop Collaboration with Vocals.
- Emily Proctor and Jason Mraz – introduced The Jonas Brothers.
- Blink 182 – presented Best Rock Album.
- Craig Ferguson – introduced Katy Perry.
- Kanye West and Estelle – presented Best New Artist.
- Morgan Freeman – introduced Kenny Chesney.
- Sean Combs, Herbie Hancock, and Natalie Cole – presented Record of the Year.
- Queen Latifah – paid tribute to Dean Martin as a Lifetime Achievement recipient and introduced Kanye West, M.I.A., Jay-Z, Lil Wayne, and T.I.
- Kate Beckinsale – introduced Paul McCartney and Dave Grohl.
- Jack Black and Charlie Haden – paid tribute to Hank Jones a Lifetime Achievement recipient and presented Best Male Pop Vocal Performance.
- Jay Mohr and LL Cool J – introduced Sugarland and Adele.
- Gwyneth Paltrow – introduced Radiohead.
- Samuel L. Jackson – introduced T.I. and Justin Timberlake.
- Neil Portnow – introduced Smokey Robinson.
- Gary Sinise – introduced Lil Wayne, Robin Thicke, and Allen Toussaint.
- Will.i.am and T-Pain – presented Best Rap Album.
- Zooey Deschanel – introduced Robert Plant and Alison Krauss.
- Green Day – presented Album of the Year.

== Awards ==
=== Special merit awards ===
MusiCares Person of the Year

- **Neil Diamond**

Lifetime Achievement Award winners

- Gene Autry
- The Blind Boys of Alabama
- The Four Tops
- Hank Jones
- Brenda Lee
- Dean Martin
- Tom Paxton

Trustees Award winners

- George Avakian
- Elliott Carter
- Allen Toussaint

Technical Grammy Award winners

- Clarence "Leo" Fender
- Universal Audio

President's Merit Award

- **Clive Davis**

=== General ===
For all of these there are both nominees and winners, the winners are in bold.

Record of the Year

- **"Please Read the Letter" – Robert Plant & Alison Krauss**
  - **T Bone Burnett, producer; Mike Piersante, engineer/mixer**
- "Chasing Pavements" – Adele
  - Eg White, producer; Tom Elmhirst & Steve Price, engineer/mixers
- "Viva la Vida" – Coldplay
  - Markus Dravs, Brian Eno & Rik Simpson, producers; Michael Brauer & Rik Simpson, engineers/mixers
- "Bleeding Love" – Leona Lewis
  - Simon Cowell, Clive Davis & Ryan "Alias" Tedder, producers; Craig Durrance, Phil Tan & Ryan "Alias" Tedder, engineers/mixers
- "Paper Planes" – M.I.A.
  - Diplo, producer; Switch, engineer/mixer

Album of the Year

- **Raising Sand – Robert Plant & Alison Krauss**
  - **T Bone Burnett, producer; Mike Piersante, engineer/mixer; Gavin Lurssen, mastering engineer**
- Viva la Vida or Death and All His Friends – Coldplay
  - Markus Dravs, Brian Eno & Rik Simpson, producers; Michael H. Brauer, Markus Dravs, John O'Mahoney, Rik Simpson & Andy Wallace, engineers/mixers; Bob Ludwig, mastering engineer
- Tha Carter III – Lil Wayne
  - Babyface, Brisco, Fabolous, Jay-Z, Kidd Kidd, Busta Rhymes, Juelz Santana, D. Smith, Static Major, T-Pain & Bobby Valentino, featured artists; Alchemist, David Banner, Vaushaun "Maestro" Brooks, Cool & Dre, Andrews "Drew" Correa, Shondrae "Mr. Bangladesh" Crawford, Darius "Deezle" Harrison, Jim Jonsin, Mousa, Pro Jay, Rodnae, Skillz & Play, D. Smith, Swizz Beatz, Robin Thicke, T-Pain & Kanye West, producers; Angel Aponte, Joshua Berkman, Andrew Dawson, Joe G, Darius "Deezle" Harrison, Fabian Marasciullo, Miguel Scott, Robin Thicke, Julian Vasquez & Gina Victoria, engineers/mixers; Vlado Meller, mastering engineer
- Year of the Gentleman – Ne-Yo
  - Chuck Harmony, Ne-Yo, Polow Da Don, StarGate, Stereotypes, Syience, Shea Taylor & Shomari "Sho" Wilson, producers; Kirven Arrington, Jeff Chestek, Kevin "KD" Davis, Mikkel Eriksen, Jaymz Hardy Martin, III, Geno Regist, Phil Tan & Tony Terrebonne, engineers/mixers; Herb Powers, Jr., mastering engineer
- In Rainbows – Radiohead
  - Nigel Godrich, producer; Nigel Godrich, Dan Grech-Marguerat, Hugo Nicolson & Richard Woodcraft, engineers/mixers; Bob Ludwig, mastering engineer

Song of the Year

- **"Viva la Vida"**
  - **Guy Berryman, Jonny Buckland, Will Champion & Chris Martin, songwriters (Coldplay)**
- "American Boy"
  - William Adams, Keith Harris, Josh Lopez, Caleb Speir, John Stephens, Estelle Swaray & Kanye West, songwriters (Estelle featuring Kanye West)
- "Chasing Pavements"
  - Adele Adkins & Eg White, songwriters (Adele)
- "I'm Yours"
  - Jason Mraz, songwriter (Jason Mraz)
- "Love Song"
  - Sara Bareilles, songwriter (Sara Bareilles)

Best New Artist

- **Adele**
- Duffy
- Jonas Brothers
- Lady Antebellum
- Jazmine Sullivan

=== Pop ===
Best Female Pop Vocal Performance

- **"Chasing Pavements" – Adele**
- "Love Song" – Sara Bareilles
- "Mercy" – Duffy
- "Bleeding Love" – Leona Lewis
- "I Kissed a Girl" – Katy Perry
- "So What" – P!nk

Best Male Pop Vocal Performance

- **"Say" – John Mayer**
- "All Summer Long" – Kid Rock
- "That Was Me" – Paul McCartney
- "I'm Yours" – Jason Mraz
- "Closer" – Ne-Yo
- "Wichita Lineman" – James Taylor

Best Pop Performance by a Duo or Group with Vocals

- **"Viva la Vida" – Coldplay**
- "Waiting in the Weeds" – Eagles
- "Going On" – Gnarls Barkley
- "Won't Go Home Without You" – Maroon 5
- "Apologize" – OneRepublic

Best Pop Collaboration with Vocals

- **"Rich Woman" – Robert Plant & Alison Krauss**
- "Lesson Learned" – Alicia Keys & John Mayer
- "4 Minutes" – Madonna, Justin Timberlake & Timbaland
- "If I Never See Your Face Again" – Maroon 5 & Rihanna
- "No Air" – Jordin Sparks & Chris Brown

Best Pop Instrumental Performance

- **"I Dreamed There Was No War" – Eagles**
- "Love Appetite" – Steve Cropper & Felix Cavaliere
- "Fortune Teller"– Fourplay
- "Steppin' Out" – Stanley Jordan
- "Blast!" – Marcus Miller

Best Pop Instrumental Album

- **Jingle All the Way – Béla Fleck and the Flecktones**
- Sax for Stax – Gerald Albright
- Greatest Hits Rerecorded Volume One – Larry Carlton
- The Spice of Life – Earl Klugh
- A Night Before Christmas – Spyro Gyra

Best Pop Vocal Album

- **Rockferry – Duffy**
- Detours – Sheryl Crow
- Long Road Out of Eden – Eagles
- Spirit – Leona Lewis
- Covers – James Taylor

=== Dance ===
Best Dance Recording

- **"Harder, Better, Faster, Stronger (Alive 2007)" – Daft Punk**
- "Ready for the Floor" – Hot Chip
- "Just Dance" – Lady Gaga & Colby O' Donis
- "Give It 2 Me" – Madonna
- "Disturbia" – Rihanna
- "Black & Gold" – Sam Sparro

Best Electronic/Dance Album

- **Alive 2007 – Daft Punk**
- New York City – Brazilian Girls
- Bring Ya to the Brink – Cyndi Lauper
- X – Kylie Minogue
- Last Night – Moby
- Robyn – Robyn

=== Traditional Pop ===
Best Traditional Pop Vocal Album

- **Still Unforgettable – Natalie Cole**
- The Sinatra Project – Michael Feinstein
- Noël – Josh Groban
- In the Swing of Christmas – Barry Manilow
- Rufus Does Judy at Carnegie Hall – Rufus Wainwright

=== Rock ===
Best Solo Rock Vocal Performance

- **"Gravity" – John Mayer**
- "I Saw Her Standing There" – Paul McCartney
- "Girls in Their Summer Clothes" Bruce Springsteen
- "Rise" – Eddie Vedder
- "No Hidden Path" – Neil Young

Best Rock Performance by a Duo or Group with Vocal

- **"Sex on Fire" – Kings of Leon**
- "Rock N' Roll Train" – AC/DC
- "Violet Hill" – Coldplay
- "Long Road Out of Eden" – Eagles
- "House of Cards" – Radiohead

Best Hard Rock Performance

- **"Wax Simulacra" – The Mars Volta**
- "Inside the Fire" – Disturbed
- "Visions" – Judas Priest
- "Saints of Los Angeles" – Mötley Crüe
- "Lords of Salem" – Rob Zombie

Best Metal Performance

- **"My Apocalypse" – Metallica**
- "Heroes of Our Time" – DragonForce
- "Nostradamus" – Judas Priest
- "Under My Thumb" – Ministry
- "Psychosocial" – Slipknot

Best Rock Instrumental Performance

- **"Peaches En Regalia" – Zappa Plays Zappa featuring Steve Vai & Napoleon Murphy Brock**
- "Castellorizon" – David Gilmour
- "Suicide & Redemption" – Metallica
- "34 Ghosts IV" – Nine Inch Nails
- "Hope (Live For The Art Of Peace)" – Rush

Best Rock Song

- **"Girls in Their Summer Clothes" – Bruce Springsteen**
- "House of Cards" – Radiohead
- "I Will Possess Your Heart" – Death Cab for Cutie
- "Sex on Fire" – Kings of Leon
- "Violet Hill" – Coldplay

Best Rock Album

- **Viva la Vida or Death and All His Friends – Coldplay**
- Rock N Roll Jesus – Kid Rock
- Only By The Night – Kings of Leon
- Death Magnetic – Metallica
- Consolers of the Lonely – The Raconteurs

=== Alternative ===
Best Alternative Music Album

- **In Rainbows – Radiohead**
- Modern Guilt – Beck
- Narrow Stairs – Death Cab for Cutie
- The Odd Couple – Gnarls Barkley
- Evil Urges – My Morning Jacket

=== R&B ===
Best Female R&B Vocal Performance

- **"Superwoman" – Alicia Keys**
- "Me, Myself and I" (Live) – Beyoncé
- "Heaven Sent" – Keyshia Cole
- "Spotlight" – Jennifer Hudson
- "Need U Bad" – Jazmine Sullivan

Best Male R&B Vocal Performance

- **"Miss Independent" – Ne-Yo**
- "You're the Only One" – Eric Benét
- "Take You Down" – Chris Brown
- "Can't Help But Wait" – Trey Songz
- "Here I Stand" – Usher

Best R&B Performance by a Duo or Group with Vocal

- **"Stay with Me (By the Sea)" – Al Green & John Legend**
- "Ribbon in the Sky" – Boyz II Men
- "Words" – Anthony David & India.Arie
- "I'm His Only Woman" – Jennifer Hudson & Fantasia
- "Never Give You Up" – Raphael Saadiq feat. Stevie Wonder & CJ Hilton

Best Traditional R&B Vocal Performance

- **"You've Got the Love I Need" – Al Green & Anthony Hamilton**
- "A Change is Gonna Come" – Wayne Brady
- "Baby I Know" – Linda Jones with Helen Bruner & Terry Jones
- "Love That Girl" – Raphael Saadiq
- "In Love With Another Man" – Jazmine Sullivan

Best Urban/Alternative Performance

- **"Be OK" – Chrisette Michele & will.i.am**
- "Say Goodbye to Love" – Kenna
- "Wanna Be" – Maiysha
- "Many Moons" – Janelle Monáe
- "Lovin You (Music)" – Wayna & Kokayi

Best R&B Song

- **"Miss Independent" – Ne-Yo**
- "Bust Your Windows" – Jazmine Sullivan
- "Customer" – Raheem DeVaughn
- "Heaven Sent" – Keyshia Cole
- "Spotlight – Jennifer Hudson

Best R&B Album

- **Jennifer Hudson – Jennifer Hudson**
- Love & Life – Eric Benét
- Motown: A Journey Through Hitsville USA – Boyz II Men
- Lay It Down – Al Green
- The Way I See It – Raphael Saadiq

Best Contemporary R&B Album

- **Growing Pains – Mary J. Blige**
- Back of My Lac' – J. Holiday
- First Love – Karina
- Year of the Gentleman – Ne-Yo
- Fearless – Jazmine Sullivan

=== Rap ===
Best Rap Solo Performance

- **"A Milli" – Lil Wayne**
- "Roc Boys (And the Winner Is)..." – Jay-Z
- "Paris, Tokyo" – Lupe Fiasco
- "N.I.*.*.E.R. (The Slave and the Master)" – Nas
- "Sexual Eruption" – Snoop Dogg

Best Rap Performance by a Duo or Group

- **"Swagga Like Us" – Jay-Z & T.I. featuring Kanye West & Lil Wayne**
- "Royal Flush" – Big Boi featuring Raekwon & Andre 3000
- "Mr. Carter – Lil Wayne featuring Jay-Z
- "Wish You Would" – Ludacris featuring T.I.
- "Put On" – Young Jeezy featuring Kanye West

Best Rap/Sung Collaboration

- **"American Boy" – Estelle featuring Kanye West**
- "Low" – Flo Rida featuring T-Pain
- "Green Light" – John Legend & Andre 3000
- "Got Money" – Lil Wayne featuring T-Pain
- "Superstar" – Lupe Fiasco featuring Matthew Santos

Best Rap Song

- **"Lollipop"**
  - **D. Carter, S. Garrett, D. Harrison, J. Scheffer & R. Zamor, songwriters (Lil Wayne featuring Static Major)**
- "Low"
  - T. Dillard, M. Humphrey & T-Pain, songwriters (Flo Rida featuring T-Pain)
- "Sexual Eruption"
  - Calvin Broadus, S. Lovejoy & D. Stewart, songwriters (Snoop Dogg)
- "Superstar"
  - Lupe Fiasco & Soundtrakk, songwriters (Lupe Fiasco featuring Matthew Santos)
- "Swagga Like Us"
  - D. Carter, S. Carter, Clifford Harris & Kanye West, songwriters (M. Arulpragasam, N. Headon, M. Jones, J. Mellor, T. Pentz & P. Simonon, songwriters) (Jay-Z & T.I. featuring Kanye West & Lil Wayne)

Best Rap Album

- **Tha Carter III – Lil Wayne**
- American Gangster – Jay-Z
- The Cool – Lupe Fiasco
- Nas – Nas
- Paper Trail – T.I.

=== Country ===
Best Female Country Vocal Performance

- **"Last Name" – Carrie Underwood**
- "For These Times" – Martina McBride
- "What I Cannot Change" – LeAnn Rimes
- "Last Call" – Lee Ann Womack
- "This Is Me You're Talking To" – Trisha Yearwood

Best Male Country Vocal Performance

- **"Letter to Me" – Brad Paisley**
- "You're Gonna Miss This" – Trace Adkins
- "In Color" – Jamey Johnson
- "Just Got Started Lovin' You" – James Otto
- "Troubadour" – George Strait

Best Country Performance by a Duo or Group with Vocal

- **"Stay" – Sugarland**
- "God Must Be Busy" – Brooks & Dunn
- "Love Don't Live Here" – Lady Antebellum
- "Every Day" – Rascal Flatts
- "Blue Side of the Mountain" – The Steel Drivers

Best Country Collaboration with Vocals

- **"Killing the Blues" – Robert Plant & Alison Krauss**
- "Shiftwork" – Kenny Chesney & George Strait
- "House of Cash" – George Strait & Patty Loveless
- "Life in a Northern Town" – Sugarland, featuring Jake Owen & Little Big Town
- "Let the Wind Chase You" – Trisha Yearwood & Keith Urban

Best Country Instrumental Performance

- **"Cluster Pluck" – Brad Paisley, James Burton, Vince Gill, John Jorgenson, Albert Lee, Brent Mason, Redd Volkaert & Steve Wariner**
- "Sumatra" – Cherryholmes
- "Two Small Cars In Rome" – Jerry Douglas & Lloyd Green
- "Sleigh Ride" – Béla Fleck & The Flecktones
- "Is This America? (Katrina 2005)" – Charlie Haden, Pat Metheny, Jerry Douglas & Bruce Hornsby

Best Country Song

- **"Stay" – Jennifer Nettles, songwriter (Sugarland**)
- "Dig Two Graves" – Randy Travis
- "I Saw God Today" – George Strait
- "In Color" – Jamey Johnson
- "You're Gonna Miss This" – Trace Adkins

Best Country Album

- **Troubadour – George Strait**
- That Lonesome Song – Jamey Johnson
- Sleepless Nights – Patty Loveless
- Around the Bend – Randy Travis
- Heaven, Heartache and the Power of Love – Trisha Yearwood

Best Bluegrass Album

- **Honoring the Fathers of Bluegrass: Tribute to 1946 and 1947 – Ricky Skaggs & Kentucky Thunder**
- Cherryholmes III: Don't Believe – Cherryholmes
- Del McCoury Band — Live At The 2008 New Orleans Jazz & Heritage Festival – Del McCoury Band
- The Ultimate Collection / Live At The Ryman – Earl Scruggs
- Wheels – Dan Tyminski

=== New Age ===
Best New Age Album

- **Peace Time – Jack DeJohnette**
- Meditations – William Ackerman
- Pathfinder – Will Clipman
- Ambrosia – Peter Kater
- The Scent of Light – Ottmar Liebert & Luna Negra

=== Jazz ===
Best Contemporary Jazz Album

- **Randy in Brasil – Randy Brecker**
- Floating Point – John McLaughlin
- Cannon Re–Loaded: All–Star Celebration of Cannonball Adderley – Various Artists
- Miles from India – Various Artists
- Lifecycle – Yellowjackets featuring Mike Stern

Best Jazz Vocal Album

- **Loverly – Cassandra Wilson**
- Imagina: Songs of Brasil – Karrin Allyson
- Breakfast on the Morning Tram – Stacey Kent
- If Less Is More...Nothing Is Everything – Kate McGarry
- Distances – Norma Winstone

Best Jazz Instrumental Solo

- **"Be–Bop" – Terence Blanchard**
- "Seven Steps to Heaven" – Till Brönner
- "Waltz for Debby" – Gary Burton & Chick Corea
- "Son of Thirteen" – Pat Metheny
- "Be–Bop" – James Moody

Best Jazz Instrumental Album, Individual or Group

- **The New Crystal Silence – Chick Corea & Gary Burton**
- History, Mystery – Bill Frisell
- Brad Mehldau Trio Live – Brad Mehldau Trio
- Day Trip – Pat Metheny featuring Christian McBride & Antonio Sánchez
- Standards – Alan Pasqua, Dave Carpenter & Peter Erskine

Best Large Jazz Ensemble Album

- **Monday Night Live at the Village Vanguard – Vanguard Jazz Orchestra**

Best Latin Jazz Album

- **Song for Chico – Arturo O'Farrill and The Afro–Latin Jazz Orchestra**

=== Gospel ===
Best Gospel Performance

- **"Get Up" – Mary Mary**
- "East to West" – Casting Crowns
- "I Understand" – Kim Burrell, Rance Allen, BeBe Winans, Mariah Carey, & Hezekiah Walker's LFC
- "Shall We Gather at the River" – Take 6
- "Waging War" – CeCe Winans

Best Gospel Song

- **"Help Me Believe" – Kirk Franklin**
  - **Kirk Franklin, songwriter**
- "Cover Me" – 21:03 with Fred Hammond, Smokie Norful, & J Moss
  - James L. Moss, songwriter
- "Get Up" – Mary Mary
  - Erica Campbell, Tina Campbell, Warryn Campbell, & Eric Dawkins, songwriters
- "Give Me Your Eyes" – Brandon Heath
  - Brandon Heath & Jason Ingram, songwriters
- "You Reign" – MercyMe
  - Jim Bryson, Steven Curtis Chapman, Nathan Cochran, Barry Graul, Bart Millard, Mike Scheuchzer, & Robby Shaffer, songwriters

Best Rock or Rap Gospel Album

- **Alive and Transported – tobyMac**
- Hello – After Edmund
- Our World: Redeemed – Flame
- We Need Each Other – Sanctus Real
- Rock What You Got – Superchick

Best Pop/Contemporary Gospel Album

- **Thy Kingdom Come – CeCe Winans**
- This Moment – Steven Curtis Chapman
- What If We – Brandon Heath
- Opposite Way – Leeland
- Hello Love – Chris Tomlin

Best Southern, Country, or Bluegrass Gospel Album

- **Lovin' Life – Gaither Vocal Band**
- Room For More – Booth Brothers
- Steps to Heaven – Charlie Louvin
- Hymned Again – Bart Millard
- Ephesians One – Karen Peck and New River

Best Traditional Gospel Album

- **Down in New Orleans – The Blind Boys of Alabama**
- I'll Say Yes – Carol Cymbala & The Brooklyn Tabernacle Choir
- Take It Back – Dorinda Clark-Cole
- Voices in Unity: Together In Worship – Deitrick Haddon
- No Limit – Bishop Charles E. Blake presents the West Angeles Church of God in Christ Choir

Best Contemporary R&B Gospel Album

- **The Fight of My Life – Kirk Franklin**
- Reflections – Jason Champion
- The Sound – Mary Mary
- Donald Lawrence Introduces: Family Prayer – The Murrills
- Stand Out – Tye Tribbett & G.A.

=== Latin ===
Best Latin Pop Album

- **La Vida... Es Un Ratico – Juanes**

Best Latin Rock or Alternative Album

- 45 – Jaguares

Best Latin Urban Album

- Los Extraterrestres – Wisin & Yandel

Best Tropical Latin Album

- Señor Bachata – José Feliciano

Best Regional Mexican Album

- Amor, Dolor y Lágrimas: Música Ranchera – Mariachi los Camperos de Nati Cano
- Canciones de Amor – Mariachi Divas

Best Tejano Album

- Viva La Revolucion – Ruben Ramos & The Mexican Revolution

Best Norteño Album

- Raíces – Los Tigres del Norte

Best Banda Album

- No Es De Madera – Joan Sebastian

=== Blues ===
Best Traditional Blues Album

- **One Kind Favor – B.B. King**
- The Blues Rolls On – Elvin Bishop
- Skin Deep – Buddy Guy
- All Odds Against Me – John Lee Hooker, Jr.
- Pinetop Perkins and Friends – Pinetop Perkins and Friends

Best Contemporary Blues Album

- **City That Care Forgot – Dr. John And The Lower 911**
- Peace, Love & BBQ – Marcia Ball
- Like a Fire – Solomon Burke
- Maestro – Taj Mahal
- Simply Grand – Irma Thomas

=== Folk ===
Best Traditional Folk Album

- **At 89 – Pete Seeger**
- Coal – Kathy Mattea
- Comedians & Angels – Tom Paxton
- Bring Me Home – Peggy Seeger
- Strangers In Another Country – Rosalie Sorrels

Best Contemporary Folk/Americana Album

- **Raising Sand – Robert Plant & Alison Krauss**
- Day After Tomorrow – Joan Baez
- I, Flathead – Ry Cooder
- Sex & Gasoline – Rodney Crowell
- All I Intended to Be – Emmylou Harris

Best Native American Music Album

- Come to Me Great Mystery: Native American Healing Songs – Various artists (Tom Wasinger, producer)

Best Hawaiian Music Album

- 'Ikena – Tia Carrere & Daniel Ho

Best Zydeco or Cajun Music Album

- Live at the 2008 New Orleans Jazz & Heritage Festival – BeauSoleil & Michael Doucet

=== Reggae ===
Best Reggae Album

- **Jah Is Real – Burning Spear**
- Let's Get Physical – Elephant Man
- Vibes – Heavy D
- Repentance – Lee "Scratch" Perry
- Intoxication – Shaggy
- Amazing – Sly and Robbie

=== World music ===
Best Traditional World Music Album

- Ilembe: Honoring Shaka Zulu – Ladysmith Black Mambazo

Best Contemporary World Music Album

- Global Drum Project – Mickey Hart, Zakir Hussain, Sikiru Adepoju & Giovanni Hidalgo
- nominee Angels & Almas – David Maldonado

=== Polka ===
Best Polka Album

- **Let the Whole World Sing – Jimmy Sturr and His Orchestra**

=== Children's ===
Best Musical Album For Children

- **Here Come the 123s – They Might Be Giants**

Best Spoken Word Album for Children

- **Yes To Running! Bill Harley Live – Bill Harley**

=== Spoken word ===
Best Spoken Word Album

- An Inconvenient Truth – Beau Bridges, Cynthia Nixon & Blair Underwood

=== Comedy ===
Best Comedy Album

- **It's Bad for Ya – George Carlin**
- Anticipation – Lewis Black
- Flight of the Conchords – Flight of the Conchords
- For Your Consideration – Kathy Griffin
- Songs of the Bushmen – Harry Shearer

=== Musical show ===
Best Musical Show Album

- In the Heights – Original Broadway Cast with Lin-Manuel Miranda & Others
  - Kurt Deutsch, Alex Lacamoire, Andrés Levin, Lin-Manuel Miranda, Joel Moss & Bill Sherman, producers; Lin-Manuel Miranda, composer/lyricist

=== Film, television and other visual media ===
Best Compilation Soundtrack Album for Motion Picture, Television or Other Visual Media

- **Juno**
- American Gangster
- August Rush
- Mamma Mia!
- Sweeney Todd — The Demon Barber Of Fleet Street

Best Score Soundtrack Album for Motion Picture, Television or Other Visual Media

- **The Dark Knight – James Newton Howard & Hans Zimmer**
- Indiana Jones and the Kingdom of the Crystal Skull – John Williams
- Iron Man – Ramin Djawadi
- There Will Be Blood – Jonny Greenwood
- WALL-E – Thomas Newman

Best Song Written for Motion Picture, Television or Other Visual Media

- **"Down to Earth" (from WALL-E) – Peter Gabriel**
- "Ever Ever After" (from Enchanted) – Carrie Underwood
- "Say" – (from The Bucket List) – John Mayer
- "That's How You Know" (from Enchanted) – Amy Adams
- "Walk Hard" (from Walk Hard: The Dewey Cox Story) – John C. Reilly

=== Composing and arranging ===
Best Instrumental Composition

- "The Adventures of Mutt" (from Indiana Jones and the Kingdom of the Crystal Skull) – John Williams
  - John Williams, composer

Best Instrumental Arrangement

- "Define Dancing" (from WALL-E) – Thomas Newman
  - Peter Gabriel & Thomas Newman, arrangers

Best Instrumental Arrangement Accompanying Vocalist(s)

- "Here's That Rainy Day" – Natalie Cole
  - Nan Schwartz, arranger

=== Package ===
Best Recording Package

- Death Magnetic – Bruce Duckworth, Sarah Moffatt & David Turner, art directors (Metallica)

Best Boxed or Special Limited Edition Package

- In Rainbows – Stanley Donwood, Mel Maxwell & Xian Munro, art directors (Radiohead)

=== Album notes ===
Best Album Notes

- Kind Of Blue: 50th Anniversary Collector's Edition – Francis Davis, album notes writer (Miles Davis)

=== Historical ===
Best Historical Album

- Art Of Field Recording Volume I: Fifty Years Of Traditional American Music Documented By Art Rosenbaum – Steven Lance Ledbetter & Art Rosenbaum, compilation producers; Michael Graves, mastering engineer (Various Artists)

=== Production, non-classical ===
Best Engineered Album, Non-Classical

- Consolers of the Lonely – The Raconteurs
  - Joe Chiccarelli, Vance Powell & Jack White III, engineers

Producer of the Year, Non-Classical

- **Rick Rubin**
  - Death Magnetic (Metallica)
  - Home Before Dark (Neil Diamond)
  - Mercy (Dancing for the Death of an Imaginary Enemy) (Ours)
  - Seeing Things (Jakob Dylan)
  - Weezer (Red Album) (Weezer)

Best Remixed Recording, Non-Classical

- "Electric Feel" (Justice Remix)
  - (MGMT), remixers Justice

=== Production, surround sound ===
Best Surround Sound Album

- Mussorgsky: Pictures at an Exhibition; Night on Bald Mountain; Prelude to Khovanshchina – Paavo Järvi & Cincinnati Symphony Orchestra – Michael Bishop & Robert Woods

=== Production, classical ===
Best Engineered Album, Classical

- David Frost, Tom Lazarus & Christopher Willis – Traditions and Transformations: Sounds of Silk Road Chicago – Miguel Harth-Bedoya, Alan Gilbert, Silk Road Ensemble, Wu Man, Yo-Yo Ma & Chicago Symphony Orchestra

Producer of the Year, Classical

- David Frost
  - Berlioz: Symphonie fantastique – Gustavo Dudamel & Los Angeles Philharmonic
  - Right Through The Bone—Julius Röntgen Chamber Music
  - Schubert: Sonata in D major; Liszt: Don Juan Fantasy – Min Kwon
  - Traditions And Transformations: Sounds Of Silk Road Chicago – Miguel Harth-Bedoya, Alan Gilbert, Yo-Yo Ma, Silk Road Ensemble, Wu Man & Chicago Symphony Orchestra

=== Classical ===
Best Classical Album

- Kurt Weill: Rise and Fall of the City of Mahagonny – James Conlon, conductor

Best Orchestral Performance

- Bernard Haitink, conductor (Chicago Symphony Orchestra) – Shostakovich: Symphony No. 4

Best Opera Recording

- Weill: Rise and Fall of the City of Mahagonny – James Conlon, conductor; Fred Vogler, producer; Anthony Dean Griffey, Patti LuPone & Audra McDonald – Donnie Ray Albert, John Easterlin, Steven Humes, Mel Ulrich & Robert Wörle Los Angeles Opera Orchestra and Chorus

Best Choral Performance

- Symphony of Psalms – Sir Simon Rattle, conductor; Simon Halsey, chorus master – Berlin Philharmonic; Rundfunkchor Berlin

Best Instrumental Soloist(s) Performance (With Orchestra)

- Esa-Pekka Salonen, conductor; Hilary Hahn (Swedish Radio Symphony Orchestra) – Schoenberg/Sibelius: Violin Concertos

Best Instrumental Soloist Performance (Without Orchestra)

- Gloria Cheng – Piano music of Salonen, Stucky, and Lutosławski

Best Chamber Music Performance

- Pacifica Quartet – Elliott Carter: String Quartets Nos. 1 and 5

Best Small Ensemble Performance

- Charles Bruffy, conductor; Phoenix Chorale – Spotless Rose: Hymns To The Virgin Mary

Best Classical Vocal Performance

- Hila Plitmann – Mr. Tambourine Man: Seven Poems of Bob Dylan – JoAnn Falletta (Buffalo Philharmonic Orchestra)

Best Classical Contemporary Composition

- Mr. Tambourine Man: Seven Poems of Bob Dylan – John Corigliano (JoAnn Falletta)

Classical Crossover Album

- Simple Gifts – King's Singers

=== Music video ===
Best Short Form Music Video

- "Pork and Beans" – Weezer
  - Mathew Cullen, video director; Bernard Rahill, video producer

Best Long Form Music Video

- Runnin' Down a Dream – Tom Petty & The Heartbreakers
  - Peter Bogdanovich, video director; Skot Bright, video producer

== Records ==
- Alison Krauss became the sixth female solo artist to have won five Grammys in one evening. The artists who won five before her are Lauryn Hill, Alicia Keys, Norah Jones, Beyoncé Knowles, and Amy Winehouse. However, at the ceremony (2010 Grammy Awards) next year, Beyoncé surpassed the record by gaining six such awards.

== In Memoriam ==
George Carlin, Jerry Wexler, Jerry Reed, Mike Smith, Rick Wright, Eartha Kitt, Buddy Miles, Mitch Mitchell, Earl Palmer, Buddy Harman, Freddie Hubbard, David "Fathead" Newman, Johnny Griffin, Jimmy McGriff, Mike Berniker, Teo Macero, Eddy Arnold, Nick Reynolds, Miriam Makeba, Odetta, Pervis Jackson, Cachao López, Norman Smith, Neil Aspinall, William Claxton, Neal Hefti, Jo Stafford, Levi Stubbs, Jheryl Busby, Norman Whitfield, Claude Jeter, Ira Tucker, Dottie Rambo, Larry Norman, Merl Saunders, F.M. Scott III, Delaney Bramlett, Alton Ellis, Shakir Stewart, Static Major, Leonard Pennario, Norman Dello Joio, Alexander Slobodyanik, Henry Z. Steinway, Earle Hagen, Isaac Hayes, Danny Federici and Bo Diddley.

== Trivia ==
- The four Grammys Lil Wayne won were the first ever Grammy Award wins in his career.
- George Strait also won his first ever Grammy Award.
- After a four-year hiatus, pop-punk band Blink-182 announced their reunion before giving the award for rock album of the year to alternative rock band Coldplay.
- LeRoi Moore, saxophonist for Dave Matthews Band, died on August 19, 2008. The video tribute to musicians who had died in the previous year excluded Moore, disappointing and angering fans. Neil Portnow, president of the National Academy of Recording Arts and Sciences, responded with a statement noting that Moore was included in a list of deceased musicians in the program for the event, and "unfortunately we are unable to include all of the talented and wonderful people within the allotted timeframe." This created a tremendous outrage from the band's fans and many other music celebrities.

== Artists with multiple nominations and awards ==
The following artists received multiple nominations:

- Eight: Lil Wayne
- Seven: Coldplay
- Six: Jay-Z, Ne-Yo and Kanye West
- Five: Alison Krauss, John Mayer, Robert Plant, Radiohead and Jazmine Sullivan
- Four: Adele, Danger Mouse, Eagles, Lupe Fiasco, George Strait, and Stargate, T.I.

The following artists received multiple awards:

- Five: Alison Krauss and Robert Plant
- Four: Lil Wayne
- Three: Coldplay
- Two: Adele, John Mayer, Ne-Yo, Daft Punk
