= Mrs. Officer =

2008 single by Lil Wayne and Bobby V

Single by Lil Wayne featuring Bobby Valentino and Kidd Kidd

from the album Tha Carter III
- B-side: "A Milli"
- Released: September 11, 2008
- Recorded: 2008
- Genre: Dirty rap, R&B
- Length: 4:47 (main/album version); 3:56 (clean radio edit); 4:35 (video mix)
- Label: Cash Money; Universal Motown
- Songwriters: Dwayne Carter, Jr.; Robert Wilson; Darius Harrison; Curtis Stewart
- Producer: Deezle

Lil Wayne singles chronology
"Swagga Like Us" (2008)	"Mrs. Officer" (2008)	"I'm So Paid" (2008)

Bobby Valentino singles chronology
"Gimme Dat" (2008)	"Mrs. Officer" (2008)	"Beep" (2008)

Music video
- "Lil Wayne - Mrs. Officer/Comfortable ft. Bobby V." on YouTube

"Mrs. Officer" is the fourth single from Lil Wayne's album Tha Carter III. Its lyrics explore the tension between criminal suspects and police officers by portraying a relationship between Lil Wayne and a female police officer; it goes so far as to reference the famous N.W.A rap song "Fuck tha Police" (though in a literal sense). The song features Bobby Valentino and Kidd Kidd, and is produced by Deezle. The music video officially debuted on September 9, 2008. It was ranked the 25th best hip-hop song of 2008 by MTV.

== Background ==
Rapper 2 Chainz, known then as Tity Boi, was originally featured on the song.

== Music video ==
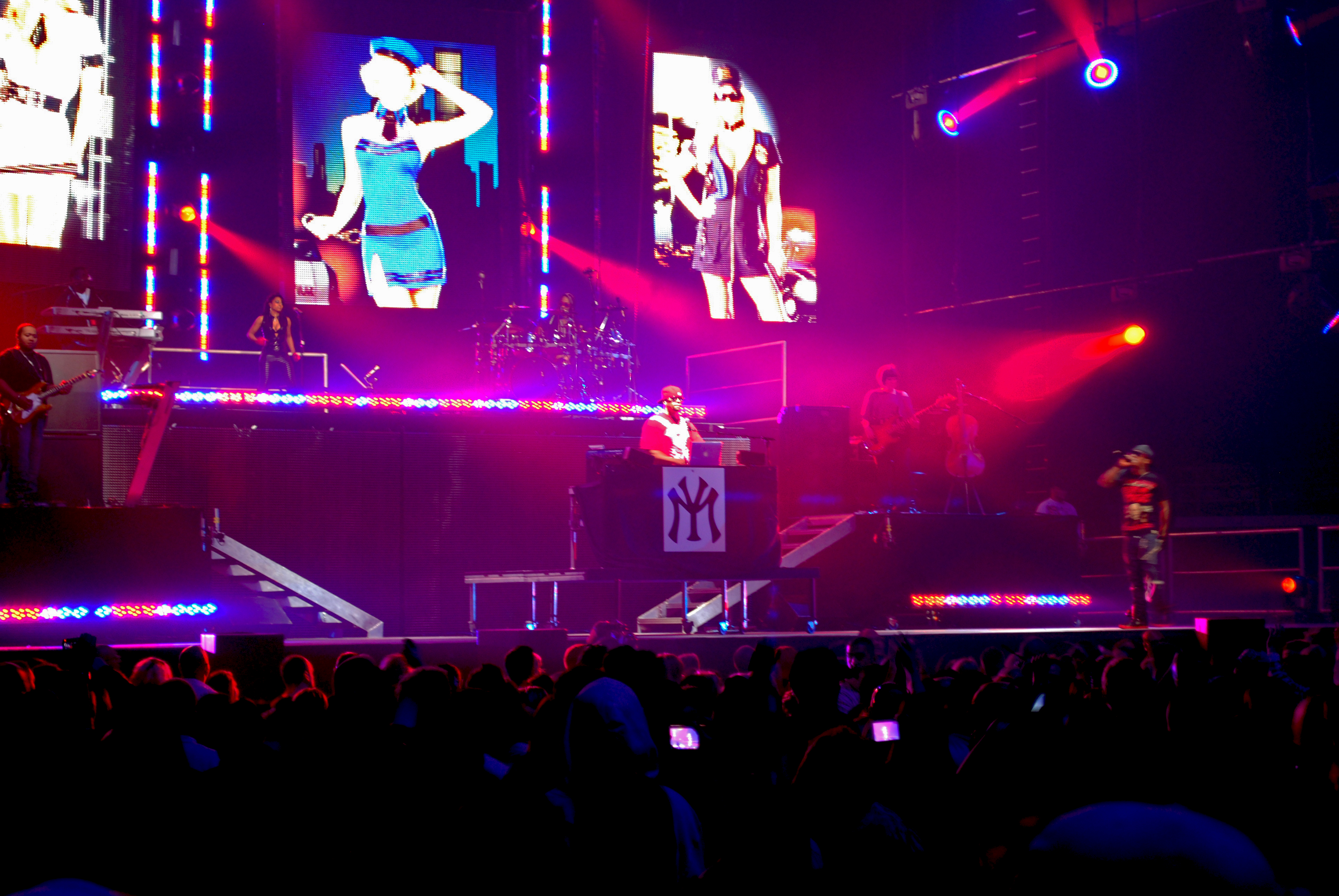
Lil Wayne performing "Mrs. Officer" at General Motors Place concert in Vancouver in January 2009.

The music video was shot in Miami, Florida, with Lil Wayne and Gil Green directing it. It is a continuation of the "A Milli" and "Got Money" music videos.

The video was released on October 31, 2008. The last verse of Mrs. Officer, with Kidd Kidd and Bobby Valentino, is cut off and replaced with the first verse from "Comfortable", another track off Tha Carter III which features R&B artist Babyface. Lil Wayne plays the lucky victim, being searched by the female cop (Tammy Torres) an hour after leaving the "A Milli" video shoot. In contrast, Bobby Valentino plays an officer, detaining several women. The "Comfortable" segment of the video is the continuation of "Mrs. Officer" where Lil Wayne and the female officer are living together and for most of the segment argue late in the night on an open street. This segment of the song also contains lines referencing Beyoncé's "Irreplaceable". Cameos were made Birdman, and Young Money Entertainment artist Mack Maine, and Jae Millz.

== Notable live performances ==
On September 9, 2023, Lil Wayne performed the song live at U.S. Vice President Kamala Harris's official residence for a concert celebrating the 50th anniversary of hip-hop music. Lil Wayne also performed the song as part of a medley at the Saturday Night Live 50th Anniversary Special on February 16, 2025.

== Chart performance ==
"Mrs. Officer" debuted at No. 86 on the Billboard Hot 100, making it the seventh song to chart on the Hot 100 from Tha Carter III. The song peaked at No. 16, making it Wayne's fourth top twenty hit on the Billboard Hot 100 from the album. It rapidly ascended the Hot R&B/Hip-Hop Songs chart, reaching No. 5, becoming his fourth top ten single on that chart from the album.

=== Charts ===
Chart (2008–2009)	Peak position
France (SNEP)	75
New Zealand (Recorded Music NZ)	12
UK Singles (OCC)	57
US Billboard Hot 100	16
US Hot R&B/Hip-Hop Songs (Billboard)	5
US Pop Airplay (Billboard)	34
US Hot Rap Songs (Billboard)	2
US Rhythmic Airplay (Billboard)	3

=== Year-end charts ===
Chart (2008)	Position
US Billboard Hot 100	91
US Hot R&B/Hip-Hop Songs (Billboard)	31
US Rhythmic (Billboard)	38
Chart (2009)	Position
US Hot R&B/Hip-Hop Songs (Billboard)	54
US Rhythmic (Billboard)	40

=== Sales and certifications ===
Region	Certification	Certified units/sales
New Zealand (RMNZ)	Gold	7,500^{*}
United Kingdom (BPI)	Silver	200,000^{‡}
United States (RIAA)	3× Platinum	3,000,000^{‡}
United States (RIAA) Mastertone	Platinum	1,000,000^{*}
^{*} Sales figures based on certification alone.^{‡} Sales+streaming figures based on certification alone.
