= Sumatra (disambiguation) =

Sumatra is an island in Indonesia.

Sumatra may also refer to:

- Sumatra, a type of ornamental fish
- Sumatra chicken, a breed of chicken originally found on the island
- Sumatran coffee, a roast/variety of Arabica coffee
- Sumatra, Florida, a town in the United States
- Sumatra PDF, a Portable Document Format reader
- Sumatra (song), song by Cherryholmes
- Sumatra, poem by Serbian poet Miloš Crnjanski
- Sumatra (HBC vessel), chartered by the Hudson's Bay Company from 1836–1838, see Hudson's Bay Company vessels
- HNLMS Sumatra (1890)
- HNLMS Sumatra (1920)

== See also ==
- Sumatriptan – a drug used to treat headaches
