= You Ain't Got Nuthin =

Promotional single by Lil Wayne featuring Fabolous and Juelz Santana

from the album Tha Carter III
- Published: June 10, 2008
- Recorded: 2007–2008
- Genre: Hardcore hip hop, gangsta rap
- Length: 5:27
- Label: Cash Money, Universal Motown
- Songwriters: D. Carter, J. Jackson, A. Maman, L. James
- Producers: The Alchemist, Deezle

"You Ain't Got Nuthin" is a song by American rapper Lil Wayne, released as the first promotional single from his sixth studio album, Tha Carter III (2008). The song, produced by The Alchemist, with additional production from Deezle, features guest appearances from fellow American rappers Juelz Santana and Fabolous. Although the song was not released as an official single, it was released as a promotional recording to radio stations and peaked at number 81 on the US Billboard Hot 100.

== Background ==
The song was originally intended for The Alchemist's 2009 album, Chemical Warfare. In late 2007, an unfinished version of the song leaked online with the same verse from Fabolous and a verse from rapper Cassidy.

== Charts ==
Chart (2008)	Peak position
Canada Hot 100 (Billboard)	81
US Billboard Hot 100	81
