= Cherryholmes III: Don't Believe =

Studio album by Cherryholmes
- Released: September 30, 2008
- Genre: Bluegrass, country
- Length: 43:53
- Label: Skaggs Family Records
- Producer: Ben Isaacs

Cherryholmes chronology
Cherryholmes II: Black and White (2007)	Cherryholmes III: Don't Believe (2008)	Cherryholmes IV: Common Theads (2010)

Cherryholmes III: Don't Believe is the third major-label studio album by Cherryholmes. The album was released on September 30, 2008 and was nominated for Best Bluegrass Album at the 51st Annual Grammy Awards.

== Content and reception ==
Professional ratings
Review scores
Source	Rating
Allmusic	3.5/5 stars
American Songwriter	3/5 stars

With four members of the Cherryholmes family in their teens and early 20s at the time of the album's recording, many songs deal with the early pressures and emotions involving heartbreak. One example is "Devil in Disguise", a cover song co-written by Gram Parsons. Other tracks on the album include "This Is My Son", about a parent sending her child off to war, and "Sumatra", which was nominated for Best Country Instrumental Performance at the 51st Annual Grammy Awards. The album was nominated in the Best Bluegrass Album category. It peaked at number three on the Billboard Top Bluegrass Albums chart and number 48 on the Top Country Albums chart.

Barry Mazor of American Songwriter wrote that "the ever-increasing vocal harmony strength, instrumental prowess, and original songwriting talent can’t be missed on this latest outing." Allmusic's James Christopher Monger remarked that on this album, the band "do(es) away completely with the traditional, opting for a sleek batch of self-penned contemporary bluegrass numbers that lean closer to Nickel Creek and the Dixie Chicks than they do Ricky Skaggs & Kentucky Thunder." Of the "Devil in Disguise" cover, Meredith Ochs of NPR said that "the song gives the Cherryholmes family a chance to demonstrate skill at that other bluegrass essential: harmonies, especially those that are genetically linked."

== Track listing ==
1. "I Can Only Love You (So Much)"-3:05
2. "The King as a Babe Comes Down"-4:05
3. "Don't Believe"-2:43
4. "This Is My Son"-3:38
5. "Sumatra"-2:58
6. "My Love for You Grows"-2:50
7. "Goodbye"-3:07
8. "Bleeding"-3:47
9. "The Sailing Man"-3:05
10. "Broken"-3:47
11. "Devil in Disguise"-2:56
12. "Mansker Spree/O'Coughlin's Reel"-3:18
13. "Traveler"-3:22
14. "[Untitled]"-1:32

== Charts ==
Chart (2008–2009)	Peak position
US Billboard Heatseekers Albums	12
US Billboard Top Bluegrass Albums	3
US Billboard Top Country Albums	48
