= Tha Carter III =

Studio album by Lil Wayne
- Released: June 10, 2008
- Recorded: 2006–2008
- Genres: Hip-hop; pop rap
- Length: 77:04
- Labels: Cash Money; Universal Motown; Young Money
- Producers: Birdman; Ronald "Slim" Williams; Lil Wayne; Alchemist; Bangladesh; Cha-Lo; Cool & Dre; D. Smith; David Banner; Deezle; DJ Nasty & LVM; Drew Correa; Infamous; GX; Jim Jonsin; Kanye West; Maestro; Mousa; Play-N-Skillz; Pro Jay; Robin Thicke; Rodnae; Swizz Beatz; Streetrunner; T-Pain

Lil Wayne chronology
The Leak (2007)	Tha Carter III (2008)	Dedication 3 (2008)

Tha Carter albums chronology
Tha Carter II (2005)	Tha Carter III (2008)	Tha Carter IV (2011)

Singles from Tha Carter III
- 1. "Lollipop" Released: March 13, 2008; 2. "A Milli" Released: April 23, 2008; 3. "Got Money" Released: May 27, 2008; 4. "Mrs. Officer" Released: September 11, 2008

Tha Carter III is the sixth studio album by American rapper Lil Wayne, released on June 10, 2008, by Cash Money, Universal Motown and Young Money Entertainment. It follows a string of mixtape releases and guest appearances on other hip-hop and R&B artists' albums. The album features appearances from Jay-Z, T-Pain, Fabolous, Robin Thicke, Busta Rhymes, Juelz Santana, Babyface, Bobby V, and Kanye West, among others. It also features Static Major, who is credited posthumously following his death in February of that year.

Amid release delays and leaks, Tha Carter III became one of the most anticipated releases of 2008. It debuted at number one on the US Billboard 200, selling over one million copies in its first week—which made it one of the fastest-selling albums in the US. It reached sales of 2.88 million copies by the end of 2008 and produced four commercially successful singles on the Billboard Hot 100—"Lollipop", which peaked at number one, and the top-ten singles "A Milli" and "Got Money", as well as the top-20 single "Mrs. Officer".

Upon its release, Tha Carter III received widespread acclaim from music critics and has since been regarded as one of Wayne's best albums. It earned the rapper several accolades, including a spot on Rolling Stone's list of The 500 Greatest Albums of All Time. It was nominated for Album of the Year at the 2009 Grammy Awards and won for Best Rap Album, while "Lollipop" won Best Rap Song and "A Milli" won Best Rap Solo Performance. It has been certified octuple platinum by the Recording Industry Association of America (RIAA).

== Background and recording ==
Lil Wayne stated that producers would include The Alchemist, Cool & Dre, Deezle, Jim Jonsin, Just Blaze, Kanye West, Mannie Fresh, The Runners, Timbaland, Danja, and will.i.am. In an interview with HipHopCanada.com, Solitair of the Black Jays stated that he and Cipha Sounds produced a track called "Outstanding", which later eventually leaked. The Runners have stated that they have produced three tracks for Tha Carter III. Lil Wayne revealed that he has a track for Eminem, which he has yet to send to him. He described this song as the "craziest". Some believe that his request was turned down, but it most likely turned into "Drop the World" on his 2010 album Rebirth.

The album features guest appearances by Fabolous, T-Pain, Brisco, Bobby V, Babyface, Betty Wright, Static Major, Robin Thicke, Jay-Z, Juelz Santana, and Busta Rhymes. MTV reported that Wyclef Jean worked on a couple of tracks for the album and that a song featuring Justin Timberlake, Nelly Furtado, and Timbaland was likely to appear on the album. However, that Timbaland-produced track did not make the final cut. David Banner confirmed that he will be credited for five tracks on the final cut of Tha Carter III, but only one is featured on the album. After the copyright controversy of "Playing with Fire", the track was later removed and replaced with another David Banner-produced track "Pussy Monster". Swizz Beatz stated he was also working on the album. When asked about how many tracks Kanye West had contributed, he answered:

On the first visit he had five joints, on the second visit he gave me a CD with fifteen joints on it. I then told him to slow down and he left me alone, but we got a good three on the album. He confirmed that he had a few tracks on The Leak that are produced by Kanye West.

== Music ==
Tha Carter III's lead single, "Lollipop", peaked at number one on the US Billboard Hot 100, staying at the top for three weeks. It was Wayne's most successful solo single in his career, winning one Grammy Award, a BET Award, and an MTV VMA. The song was praised as an "electro-bumpin'…infectious track", perceived as more of a "bubblegum" pop track than rap. The second track on the album, "Mr. Carter", was nominated for a Grammy while also peaking within the Hot 100. Jay-Z's guest verse on the song was praised, which was seen as him passing the throne to Wayne. The second single, "A Milli", was a top ten hit and was praised as one of the best songs of 2008. The song garnered countless freestyles and remixes, while Wayne's original version was praised with "spectacular rhyme". "Dr. Carter", the sixth track, was also praised for lyrical content and humor as Wayne took on the persona of a doctor performing surgery on various patients (a metaphor for Wayne resurrecting hip-hop). "Tie My Hands", featuring Robin Thicke, was praised as a deep track featuring "political commentary" and "despair" with Thicke's performance being the most complementary to Wayne. "Phone Home" also features various alien metaphors reminiscent of the film E.T. the Extra-Terrestrial (1982).

== Release and promotion ==
=== Leaks ===
After most of the album leaked on the Internet in mid-2007, Lil Wayne used the leaked tracks, plus four new songs to make an album titled The Leak. The Leak was to be officially released on December 18, 2007, with the actual album being delayed until June 10, 2008. When questioned about the unplanned leak, Lil Wayne said:

We have to find out exactly what's out there. I'll probably just [collect] all the songs that's floating around and make my own mixtape called The Leak since people want the music so bad. To tell you the truth though, there's a song I did with Kanye West out there—of course you want to save that for your album, but the rest of them songs probably wouldn't have made the album. There's a song floating around that says 'produced by Timbaland'.

Lil Wayne later called DJ Drama's radio show Shade 45 Sirius Satellite Radio to explain that his comments were meant specifically for DJ Empire who leaked his materials periodically without his permission, consent, or knowledge; he also apologized for any misunderstandings between him and the numerous DJs that have aided him in the mixtape industry. He made it clear, however, that he wished for any feelings of dislike or resentment to remain.

In a June 2008 interview with Billboard, Lil Wayne explained that the unauthorized release of tracks compelled him to release mixtapes rather than albums between Tha Carter II and Tha Carter III.

=== Singles ===
The album's lead single, "Lollipop", topped the US Billboard Hot 100 for 5 non-consecutive weeks, making it Wayne's most successful single in his career. It features rapper Static Major. The album's second single, "A Milli", was another top ten. It reached No. 6 on the Billboard Hot 100. It also won a Grammy for Best Rap Song. The video for the second single, "A Milli", was set to be released in May, and has since been mainstreamed. Multiple versions of the track were to be included on the album as "skit-like" tracks, featuring artists such as Tyga, Cory Gunz, Hurricane Chris and Lil Mama. Another artist, 13-year-old Lil Chuckee, was also set to appear on one of the "A Milli" skits. None of the skits made the final cut of the album. The third single is "Got Money", featuring T-Pain. It reached No. 10 on the Billboard Hot 100. The fourth single is "Mrs. Officer", featuring Bobby Valentino. It made the Top 20 in just four weeks. "Lollipop", "A Milli", "Got Money", and another track, "Mr. Carter", were nominated for a Grammy. Lil Wayne also performed "Tie My Hands" with Robin Thicke at the 51st Grammy Awards.

The album also featured the releases of promo singles. "3 Peat" peaked at number 66 on the Billboard 100. "You Ain't Got Nuthin" featuring Fabolous and Juelz Santana was released as a promo single, peaking at number 81 on the Billboard 100. "Mr. Carter", featuring Jay-Z, peaked at number 62 on the Billboard 100, number 27 on the Hot R&B/Hip Hop Songs chart, and number 13 on the Top Rap Songs. It was nominated for a Grammy for Best Rap Performance by a Duo or a Group in 2009.

=== Lawsuits ===
On July 24, 2008, Abkco Music Inc. filed a lawsuit against Lil Wayne for copyright infringement and unfair competition, specifically referring to the track "Playing with Fire". In the lawsuit, Abkco claims that the song was obviously derived from The Rolling Stones' "Play with Fire", to which Abkco owns the rights. Subsequently, "Playing with Fire" was removed from the track list of Tha Carter III on all online music stores and replaced with the David Banner produced track, "Pussy Monster".

In March 2011, producer Deezle (Darius Harrison) sued Wayne and his parent labels Cash Money Records over unpaid royalties from Tha Carter III album. In May 2011, producer Bangladesh also filed a lawsuit against Weezy & Co. over unpaid royalties. In early June 2011, another producer named David Kirkwood filed a lawsuit against Young Money Entertainment and Cash Money Records on claims that the labels have failed to pay him over $1.5 million in royalties and production services for his work on the album, also including his songwriting on "Love Me or Hate Me", a bonus song featured only on the deluxe edition of the album. Also in June 2011, Dallas producers Play-N-Skillz filed a lawsuit against him claiming Wayne owed them at least $1 million in unpaid royalties for "Got Money" from Tha Carter III.

== Critical reception ==
Professional ratings
Aggregate scores
Source	Rating
Metacritic	84/100
Review scores
Source	Rating
AllMusic	5/5 stars
The A.V. Club	B
Blender	4.5/5 stars
Entertainment Weekly	B−
The Guardian	4/5 stars
Los Angeles Times	3/4 stars
MSN Music (Consumer Guide)	A−
Pitchfork	8.7/10
Rolling Stone	4.5/5 stars
Uncut	4/5 stars

Tha Carter III received widespread acclaim from music critics. At Metacritic, which assigns a normalized rating out of 100 to reviews from mainstream critics, the album received an average score of 84, based on 26 reviews, indicating "universal acclaim". AllMusic editor David Jeffries praised Wayne's "entertaining wordplay and plenty of well-executed, left-field ideas". The Guardian's Alex Macpherson lauded Wayne's rapping, stating "Just trying to keep up with Wayne's mind as he proves the case is a thrill. He breaks language down into building blocks for new metaphors, exploiting every possible semantic and phonetic loophole for humour and yanking pop culture references into startling new contexts".

Jonah Weiner of Blender called it "a weird, gripping triumph". Rolling Stone writer Jody Rosen commended its themes and stated "This isn't a mixtape, it's a suite of songs, paced and sequenced for maximum impact". Jon Pareles of The New York Times commented that Wayne "has clearly worked to make 'Tha Carter III' a statement of its own: one that moves beyond standard hip-hop boasting (though there's plenty of that) to thoughts that can be introspective or gleefully unhinged". Pitchfork's Ryan Dombal stated, "he distills the myriad metaphors, convulsing flows, and vein-splitting emotions into a commercially gratifying package". In his consumer guide for MSN Music, critic Robert Christgau noted that "every track attends to detail" and quipped, "From the start you know this is no mixtape because it's clearer and more forceful". Uncut stated that "the prince of hip-hop gets a blessing from the king". Mosi Reeves of Paste gave it a favorable review and noted that the album "hearkens to when rap meant rapp: Isaac Hayes talking for days about some girl he broke with, or Bobby Womack signifying while strumming a blues guitar". Nathan Rabin of The A.V. Club called Lil Wayne "the man of the moment, but the disc's best moments strive for timelessness and attain it".

The Washington Post's J. Freedom du Lac commended Wayne for his "impulses to be outrageous and unconventional", calling him a "nonsensical genius", but found the album "uneven". Tom Breihan of The Village Voice described it as "a sprawling mess, and it clangs nearly as often as it clicks" and "a work of staggering heights and maddening inconsistencies", but commended Wayne for his unconventional performance, stating "On paper, this is a textbook focus-grouped major-label hodgepodge, replete with girl songs and club songs and street songs. But every facet of the album comes animated and atomized by Wayne's absurdist drug-gobbling persona". Drew Hinshaw of PopMatters stated "Tha Carter III is a monumental album full of powerful, self-defeating statements that obliterate rap's internal logic without offering too much more than indifferent bong logic in return. Judged, however, as a collection of singles and quotable verses—the criteria on which we've been grading hip-hop records since the end of disco—Tha Carter III is an agonizing piece of work". Jeff Weiss of the Los Angeles Times found it "scattershot", stating "When Wayne's mad alchemy works, Tha Carter III evinces shades of brilliance that merit the wild hype, but in its transparent attempts to define its era, it fails, falling victim to the imperial bloat of its big-budget mishmash of styles". Jon Caramanica of Entertainment Weekly wrote that "this schizoid album […] is alternately mesmerizing and inscrutable". Slant Magazine's Dave Hughes viewed that it lacks a "focus" as an album, and stated, "while there are a lot of […] great moments here, Carter III is not the definitive statement of Wayne's mastery that he clearly intended it to be". Brandon Perkins of URB commented that "As a sum of its parts, Tha Carter III does not transcend, but a good number of those parts are otherworldly enough". Julian Benbow of The Boston Globe said the album was "not an instant classic, but it is the best rap album since Kanye West dropped "Graduation" last year". Eric R. Danton of the Hartford Courant said of Lil Wayne, "If his raspy, cartoonish voice didn't mark him as different, his quick wit, offhanded wordplay and quirky subject matter should have in a genre populated largely by grim-faced imitators".

Other reviews are average or mixed: Chase Hoffberger of The Austin Chronicle gave the album three stars out of five and said, "It's Wayne's personality that both floats and sinks TCIII". Kilian Murphy of Hot Press also gave it a score of three out of five and stated, "Gifted MC loses the run of himself without Mannie Fresh". Lewis P. of Sputnikmusic likewise gave it a score of three out of five and said the album "is scattershot, which oddly strengthens its faults, as if any lull in quality means that the next batch of producers can just reset the formula". (However, nearly three years later, in 2011, Alex Robertson of the same website gave the album a score of four-and-a-half out of five and said it was "sort of a miracle: it's way too weird and confusing to be on the mainstream rap charts--to be that record that everyone knows about--but it is anyway. This album was in opposition to much of modern rap but somehow became popular and then proceeded to completely consume the genre and change its direction. […] Tha Carter III is a contradictory, against-all-odds masterpiece, and Lil Wayne may never perfect this balance again. I sincerely question: will anyone?") Ajitpaul Manjat of Tiny Mix Tapes gave the album two-and-a-half stars out of five and stated that, "equipped with the stylish, but too-often substance-less Tha Carter III, Lil Wayne seems poised to flip the script on the 'rapper racists' (radio stations, MTV) by evolving into the 'biggest' rapper alive".

=== Accolades ===
Tha Carter III was ranked number one in Blender's list of the 33 best albums of 2008. Christgau ranked its deluxe edition as the second best album of 2008. The album was also ranked number three on Rolling Stone's list of the top 50 albums of 2008. It was nominated for a Grammy Award for Album of the Year, and it won for Best Rap Album at the 2009 Grammy Awards, while "Lollipop" won for Best Rap Song and "A Milli" won for Best Rap Solo Performance. Billboard magazine ranked the album number 103 on its list of the Top 200 Albums of the Decade. In 2012, the album was ranked number 437 on Rolling Stone's list of the 500 Greatest Albums of All Time, upgrading to number 208 in 2020 revised list. In 2012 Complex named the album one of the classic albums of the last decade.

== Commercial performance ==
With opening day sales figures of approximately 423,000 copies, Tha Carter III debuted at number one on the US Billboard 200 chart, selling 1,005,545 copies in its first week. This became Wayne's first US number one debut and his sixth top-ten album. With its first week sales, it is the largest first week sales for any album in 2008 in the United States and the first album to reach the million mark in one week since 50 Cent's The Massacre (2005). In its second week, the album dropped to number two on the chart, behind Coldplay's Viva La Vida or Death And All His Friends, selling an additional 309,000 copies. By the end of 2008, Tha Carter III had sold approximately 2.88 million copies and it was named the best-selling album of the year in the United States by Billboard. On September 25, 2020, the album was certified six times platinum by the Recording Industry Association of America (RIAA), for combined sales and album-equivalent units of over six million units in the United States.

Tha Carter III has also reached the top spot in the Canadian Albums Chart, selling nearly 21,000 units. Elsewhere, the album known an international but moderate success due to the rise of popularity of "Lollipop", reaching the top ten in New Zealand and twenty in Norway and Switzerland, top thirty in the Netherlands, France and Germany. However, it entered at only number 23 in the UK and number 34 on the Irish Albums Chart. Tha Carter III was Wayne's first album to entering in several national album charts in 2008.

== Track listing ==
No.	Title	Writer(s)	Producer(s)	Length
1.	"3 Peat"	Dwayne Carter; Vaushaun Brooks; Colin Westover	Maestro	3:19
2.	"Mr. Carter" (featuring Jay-Z)	D. Carter; Andrews Correa; Sha Ron Prescott; Shawn Carter; Marco Rodriguez	Infamous; Drew Correa	5:16
3.	"A Milli"	D. Carter; C. Hester; Shondrae Crawford; Quentin Cook	Bangladesh	3:41
4.	"Got Money" (featuring T-Pain)	D. Carter; Faheem Najm; Juan Salinas; Oscar Salinas	Play-N-Skillz; T-Pain	4:04
5.	"Comfortable" (featuring Babyface)	D. Carter; Kanye West; Kenneth Edmonds	West	4:25
6.	"Dr. Carter"	D. Carter; Kasseem Dean; David Axelrod	Swizz Beatz	4:24
7.	"Phone Home"	D. Carter; Eddie Montilla; Andre Lyon; Marcello Valenzano	Cool & Dre	3:11
8.	"Tie My Hands" (featuring Robin Thicke)	D. Carter; Robin Thicke	Thicke	5:19
9.	"Mrs. Officer" (featuring Bobby V and Kidd Kidd)	D. Carter; Darius Harrison; Bobby Wilson	Deezle	4:47
10.	"Let the Beat Build"	D. Carter; West; Harrison; Edward Kendrick	West; Deezle	5:09
11.	"Shoot Me Down" (featuring D. Smith)	D. Carter; Dreshan Smith	D. Smith	4:29
12.	"Lollipop" (featuring Static Major)	D. Carter; Harrison; Stephen Garrett; James Scheffer	Jim Jonsin; Deezle (co.)	4:59
13.	"La La" (featuring Brisco & Busta Rhymes)	D. Carter; Lavell Crump; British Mitchell; Trevor Smith, Jr.	David Banner	4:21
14.	"Playing with Fire" (featuring Betty Wright)	D. Carter; Nicholas Warwar; Jason Desrouleaux; Betty Wright	Streetrunner	4:21
15.	"You Ain't Got Nuthin" (featuring Juelz Santana & Fabolous)	D. Carter; Harrison; Alan Maman; John Jackson; LaRon James	Alchemist	5:27
16.	"DontGetIt"	D. Carter; Mousa; Gloria Caldwell; Sol Marcus; Rodnae Young; Benne Benjamin; Eunice Waymon	Rodnae	9:52
Total length:				77:04

Track 14 on later versions (replaces "Playing with Fire")
No.	Title	Writer(s)	Producer(s)	Length
14.	"Pussy Monster"	D. Carter; Banner	Banner	5:13
Total length:				78:02

iTunes bonus tracks
No.	Title	Writer(s)	Producer(s)	Length
17.	"Lollipop (Remix)" (featuring Kanye West and Static Major)	D. Carter; West; Garrett; Harrison	Jim Jonsin; Deezle	4:21
18.	"Prostitute 2"	D. Carter; Brooks; Harrison	Maestro; Deezle	5:50

Deluxe edition bonus disc
No.	Title	Writer(s)	Producer(s)	Length
1.	"I'm Me"	D. Carter; Lenny Mollings; Johnny Mollings	DJ Nasty & LVM	4:55
2.	"Gossip"	D. Carter; Warwar; Lamont Dozier; Brian Holland; Eddie Holland	Streetrunner	3:25
3.	"Kush"	D. Carter; Brooks; Linda Lou McCall; Louis McCall; Danny Thomas	Maestro	3:42
4.	"Love Me or Hate Me"	D. Carter; David Kirkwood	GX	4:00
5.	"Talkin' About It"	D. Carter; Rodriguez; Bigram Zayas	Infamous; Develop	3:31

Target limited deluxe edition bonus disc
No.	Title	Writer(s)	Producer(s)	Length
1.	"Action"	D. Carter; Harrison	Deezle	3:45
2.	"Whip It"	D. Carter; Harrison	Deezle	6:01
3.	"I'm Me"	D. Carter; L. Mollings; J. Mollings	DJ Nasty & LVM	4:55
4.	"Gossip"	D. Carter; Warwar; Dozier; B. Holland; E. Holland	Streetrunner	3:25
5.	"Kush"	D. Carter; Brooks; L. L. McCall; L. McCall; Thomas	Maestro	3:42
6.	"Love Me or Hate Me"	D. Carter; Kirkwood	GX	4:00
7.	"Talkin' About It"	D. Carter; Rodriguez; Zayas	Infamous; Develop	3:31

Notes

- "A Milli" contains a sample from "I Left My Wallet In El Segundo (Vampire Mix)", as performed by A Tribe Called Quest.
- "Comfortable" contains an uncredited sample from "You Don't Know My Name", written by Alicia Keys, Kanye West, and Harold Lilly, and performed by Keys.
- "Dr. Carter" contains samples from "Holy Thursday", written by David A. Axelrod.
- "DontGetIt" contains samples from "Don't Let Me Be Misunderstood", written by Bennie Benjamin, Gloria Caldwell and Sol Marcus.
- "Action" contains a sample of "I'm So Hood" by DJ Khaled.
- "I'm Me" contains samples of "Go D.J"., "Fireman", "Hustler Musik", and "Cash Money Millionaires" by Lil Wayne, "God Moving Over the Face of the Waters" by Moby, and "Rubberband Man" by T.I.
- "Gossip" contains a sample of "Stop! In the Name of Love"; written by Lamont Dozier, Brian Holland, and Eddie Holland; and performed by Margie Joseph.
- "Kush" contains samples from the composition "Honey Wild", written by Linda Lou McCall, Louis McCall, and Danny Thomas.
- On the clean version, "Pussy Monster" is retitled as "Monster".

== Personnel ==
Credits for Tha Carter III adapted from AllMusic.

- Chad Gilbreath/SoulReaveR – producer
- Angelo Aponte – engineer
- David Banner – producer
- Joshua Berkman – digital editing
- Miguel Angel Mendoza Bermudez – mixing assistant
- Sandy Brummels – creative director
- Katina Bynum – project manager
- Gloria Caldwell – composer
- Ludas Charles – keyboards
- Andrew Dawson – mixing
- Jim Jonsin – producer
- Jonathan Mannion – photography
- Fabian Marasciullo – mixing
- Sol Marcus – composer
- Vlado Meller – mastering
- Sha Ron Prescott – vocals
- Pro-Jay – engineer, musician, producer
- James Scheffer – composer
- Miguel Scott – engineer
- Swizz Beatz – producer
- Robin Thicke – musician, producer
- Julian Vasquez – engineer
- Gina Victoria – engineer
- Kanye West – producer

== Charts ==
=== Weekly charts ===
Weekly chart performance for Tha Carter III
Chart (2008)	Peak position
Australian Albums (ARIA)	47
Austrian Albums (Ö3 Austria)	71
Belgian Albums (Ultratop Flanders)	83
Belgian Albums (Ultratop Wallonia)	97
Canadian Albums (Billboard)	1
Dutch Albums (Album Top 100)	21
French Albums (SNEP)	25
German Albums (Offizielle Top 100)	29
Irish Albums (IRMA)	34
New Zealand Albums (RMNZ)	10
Norwegian Albums (VG-lista)	11
Scottish Albums (Official Charts)	58
Swiss Albums (Schweizer Hitparade)	17
UK Albums (Official Charts)	23
US Billboard 200	1
US Top R&B/Hip-Hop Albums (Billboard)	1
US Top Rap Albums (Billboard)	1

=== Year-end charts ===
2008 year-end chart performance for Tha Carter III
Chart (2008)	Position
Canadian Albums (Billboard)	21
UK Albums (OCC)	180
US Billboard 200	3
US Top R&B/Hip-Hop Albums (Billboard)	2
US Top Rap Albums (Billboard)	1

2009 year-end chart performance for Tha Carter III
Chart (2009)	Position
US Billboard 200	49
US Top R&B/Hip-Hop Albums (Billboard)	21
US Top Rap Albums (Billboard)	8

2010 year-end chart performance for Tha Carter III
Chart (2010)	Position
US Billboard 200	181

2023 year-end chart performance for Tha Carter III
Chart (2023)	Position
US Billboard 200	194

2024 year-end chart performance for Tha Carter III
Chart (2024)	Position
US Billboard 200	170

2025 year-end chart performance for Tha Carter III
Chart (2025)	Position
US Billboard 200	137
US Top R&B/Hip-Hop Albums (Billboard)	67

=== Decade-end charts ===
Decade-end chart performance for Tha Carter III
Chart (2000–2009)	Position
US Billboard 200	103

== Certifications ==
Certifications for Tha Carter III
Region	Certification	Certified units/sales
Australia (ARIA)	Gold	35,000^{‡}
Canada (Music Canada)	2× Platinum	160,000^{^}
Netherlands (NVPI)	Gold	18,600^{‡}
United Kingdom (BPI)	Gold	207,969
United States (RIAA)	8× Platinum	8,000,000^{‡}
^{^} Shipments figures based on certification alone.^{‡} Sales+streaming figures based on certification alone.
