= Cherryholmes =

American bluegrass band

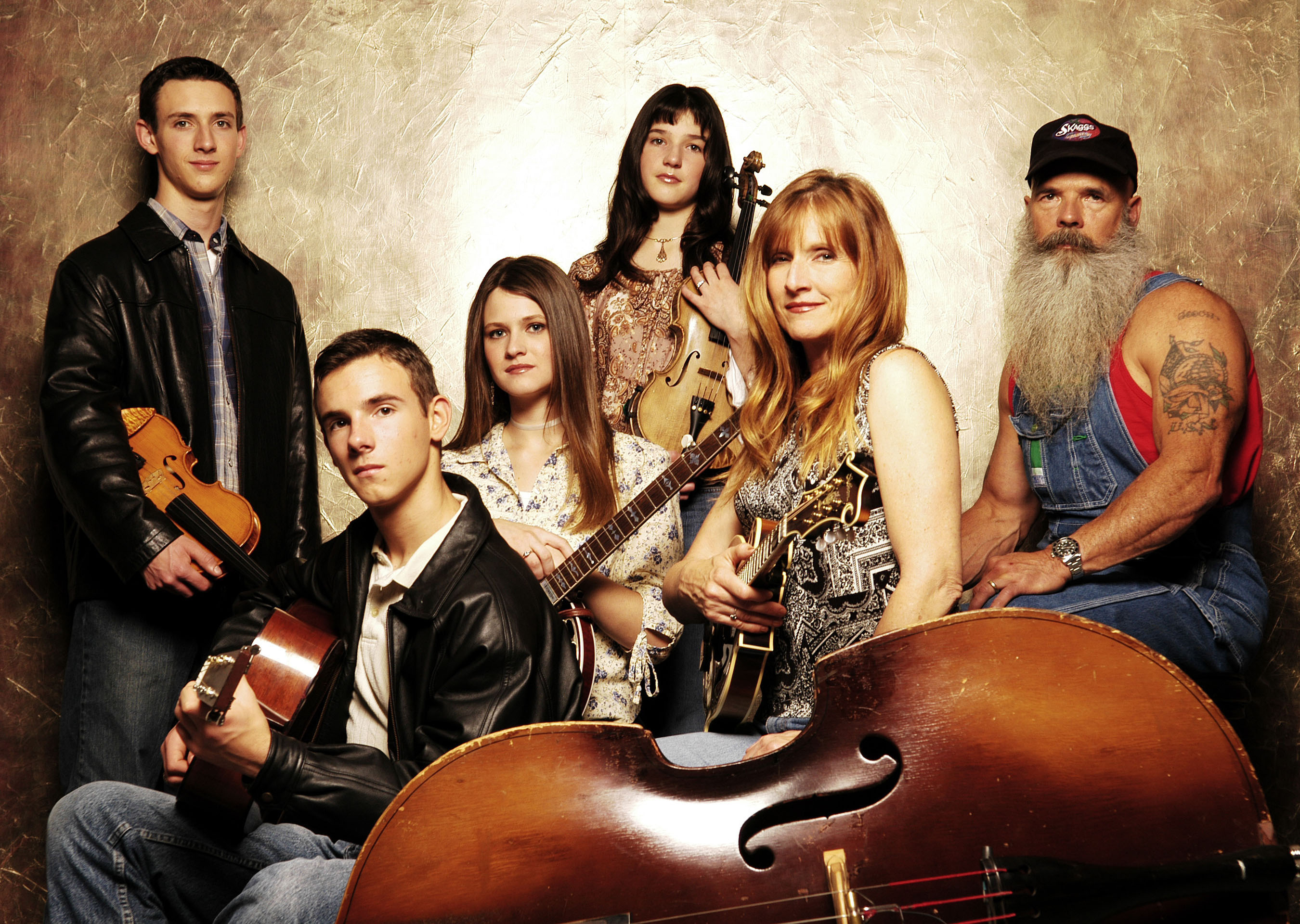
- The Cherryholmes Family

Background information
- Origin: Los Angeles, California
- Genres: Bluegrass
- Years active: 1999–2011
- Label: Skaggs Family Records
- Past members: Jere Cherryholmes (Pop), Sandy Lee Cherryholmes, Cia Leigh Cherryholmes, Molly Kate Cherryholmes, B.J. Cherryholmes, Skip Cherryholmes
- Website: www.cherryholmes.com

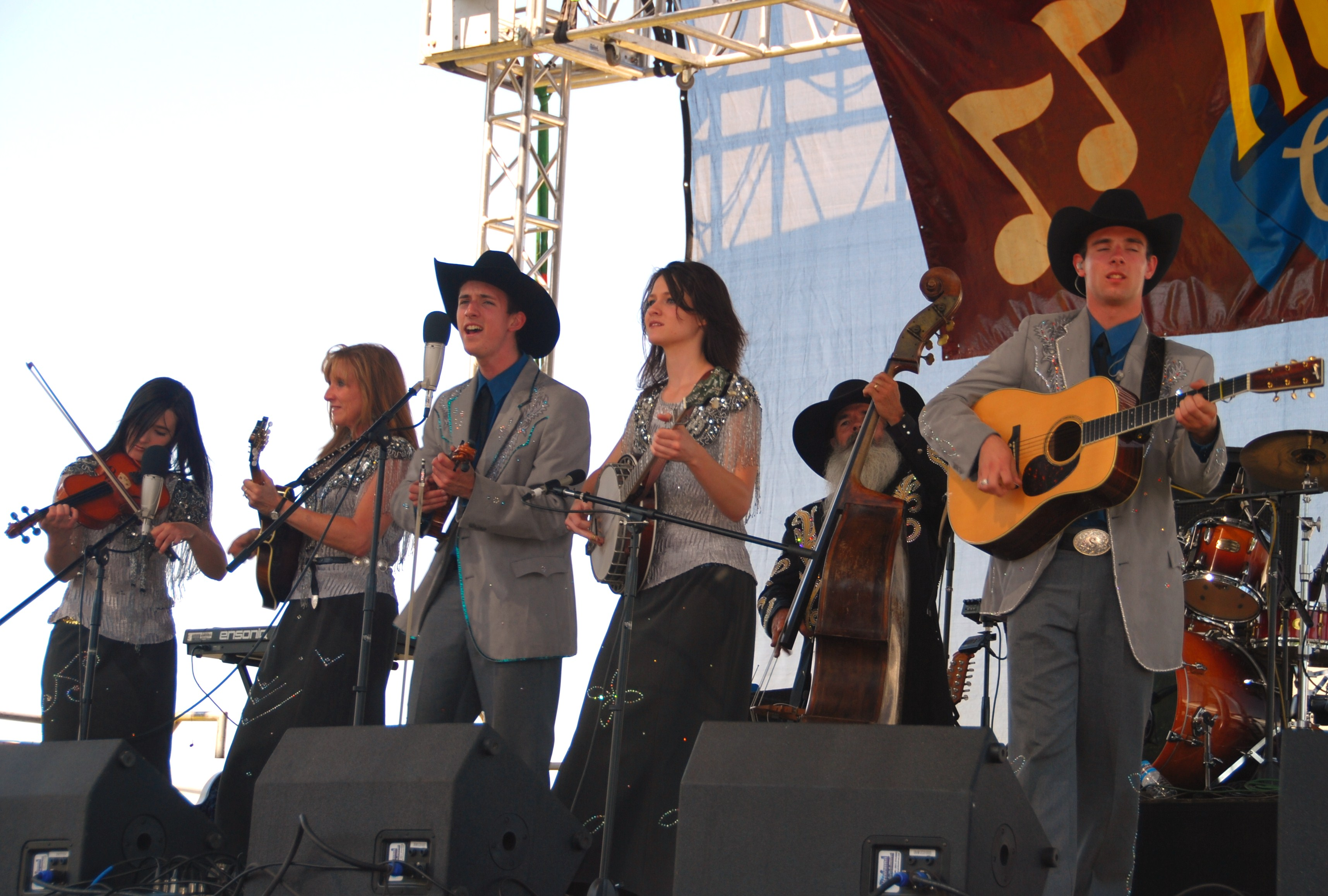
Cherryholmes performing on stage in 2007

Cherryholmes was an American Bluegrass band from Los Angeles, California. The band was made up of six members of the Cherryholmes family: father Jere (Pop), mother Sandy Lee, daughters Cia Leigh, and Molly Kate, and sons B.J. and Skip.

== History ==
In April 1999, Jere and Sandy Lee took the family to a local bluegrass festival, and the family decided to play as a group. Jere already played electric bass, acoustic guitar and the upright bass, and Sandy played guitar, fiddle, mandolin, and piano. Cia began learning guitar. B.J. and Molly began learning the fiddle. Skip started with the mandolin.

In July 1999, they auditioned and were hired for their first gig, at Oak Tree Village (now Oak Tree Mountain), a theme park in Oak Glen, California. They continued to play regularly as amateurs at bluegrass venues and festivals throughout southern California and Arizona.

In 2000 they turned professional and in 2002 they sold their home and purchased a 26-foot travel trailer, traveling throughout the Midwest and the Eastern United States. They earned enough in the first year to buy their first tour bus. In the spring of 2003 they arrived in Nashville, Tennessee at the Grand Ole Opry for their first appearance.

In 2005, they signed with Skaggs Family Records (musician Ricky Skaggs) and were later nominated for the IMBA categories 'Entertainers of the Year' and 'Emerging Artist of the Year', winning 'Entertainers of the Year'.

Columbia Artist Management (CAMI) booked them into theaters and performing arts centers, and eventually into performances with symphony orchestras around the country. They traveled nearly a million miles in their tour bus playing at bluegrass, country, roots and rock venues, including Lincoln Center, Tennessee's Bonnaroo and CMA Music Festivals, Stage Coach in California. They performed regularly on the Grand Ole Opry.

They received five Grammy nominations and a Dove Award nomination. Their music appeared on Gaither Music CDs and DVDs and appeared on PBS specials, including the award-winning Bluegrass Underground. In March, 2006 their story was featured in a Billy Graham Television special.

Cherryholmes toured Switzerland, France, Japan, the United Kingdom, Canada, and the Caribbean.

On January 12, 2011, Cherryholmes announced they would disband, saying that the children needed to choose their own paths and to be free from the complexities of a family business. Their last show was in Galax, Virginia, May 7, 2011.

The band was scheduled to reunite for a performance on September 26, 2015 at the Outer Banks Bluegrass Island Festival in Manteo, North Carolina but the event was cancelled due to weather.

== Discography ==
Title	Album details	Peak chart positions		
Title	Album details	US Grass	US Country	US Heat
Still a Little Rough Around the Edges	Release date: 2001; Label: self-released	—	—	—
Dressed for Success	Release date: 2002; Label: self-released	—	—	—
Bluegrass Vagabonds	Release date: 2003; Label: self-released	—	—	—
Cherryholmes	Release date: September 27, 2005; Label: Skaggs Family Records	3	74	—
Cherryholmes II: Black and White	Release date: June 12, 2007; Label: Skaggs Family Records	1	—	—
Cherryholmes III: Don't Believe	Release date: September 30, 2008; Label: Skaggs Family Records	3	48	12
Cherryholmes IV: Common Threads	Release date: June 1, 2010; Label: Skaggs Family Records	1	—	25
"—" denotes releases that did not chart

== See also ==
- Mountain Heart
