= Barry Mazor =

Music journalist

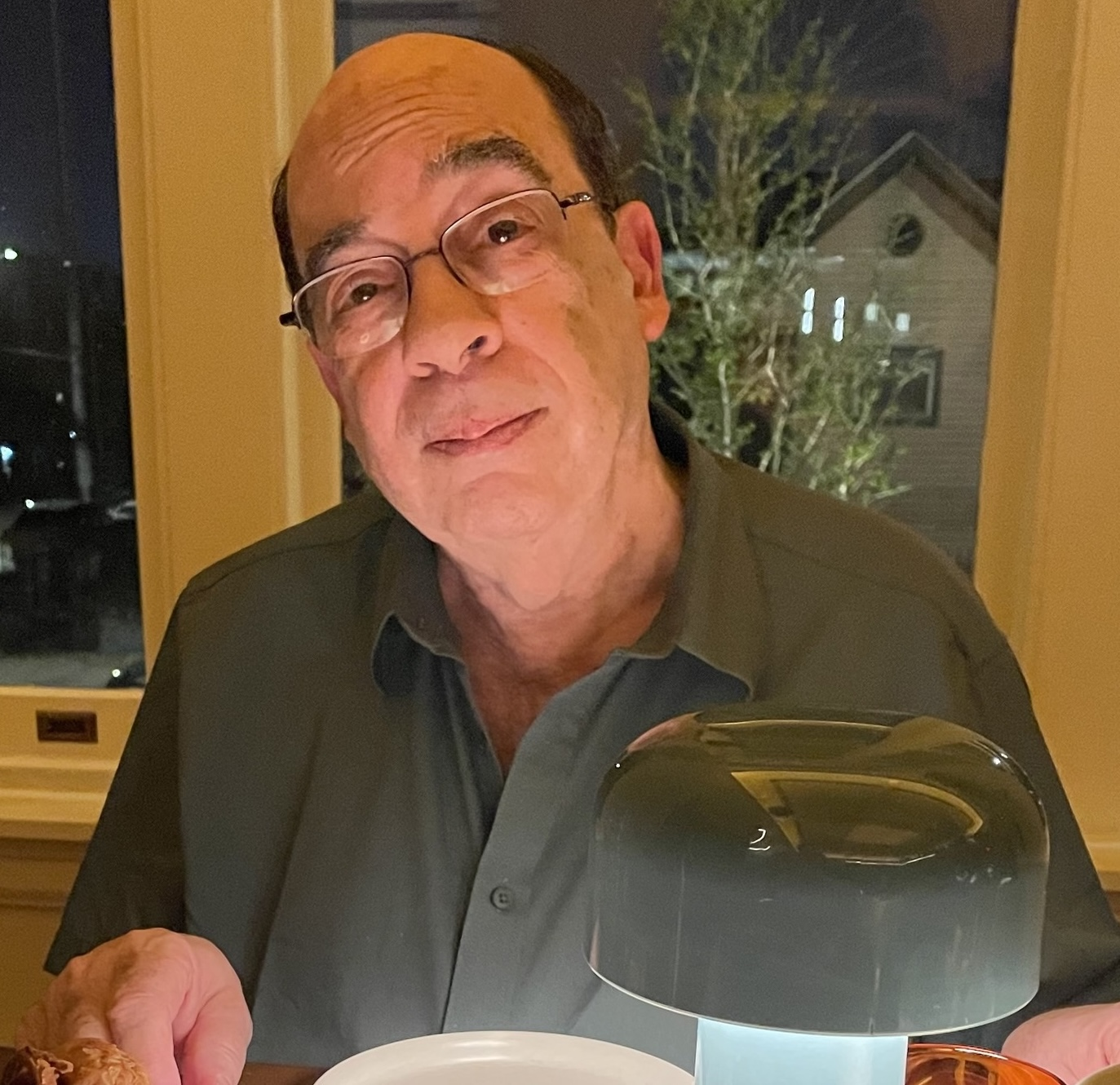
- Mazor in 2025
- Born: Philadelphia, Pennsylvania
- Occupations: Music critic; author; journalist
- Writing career
- Period: 1970—present

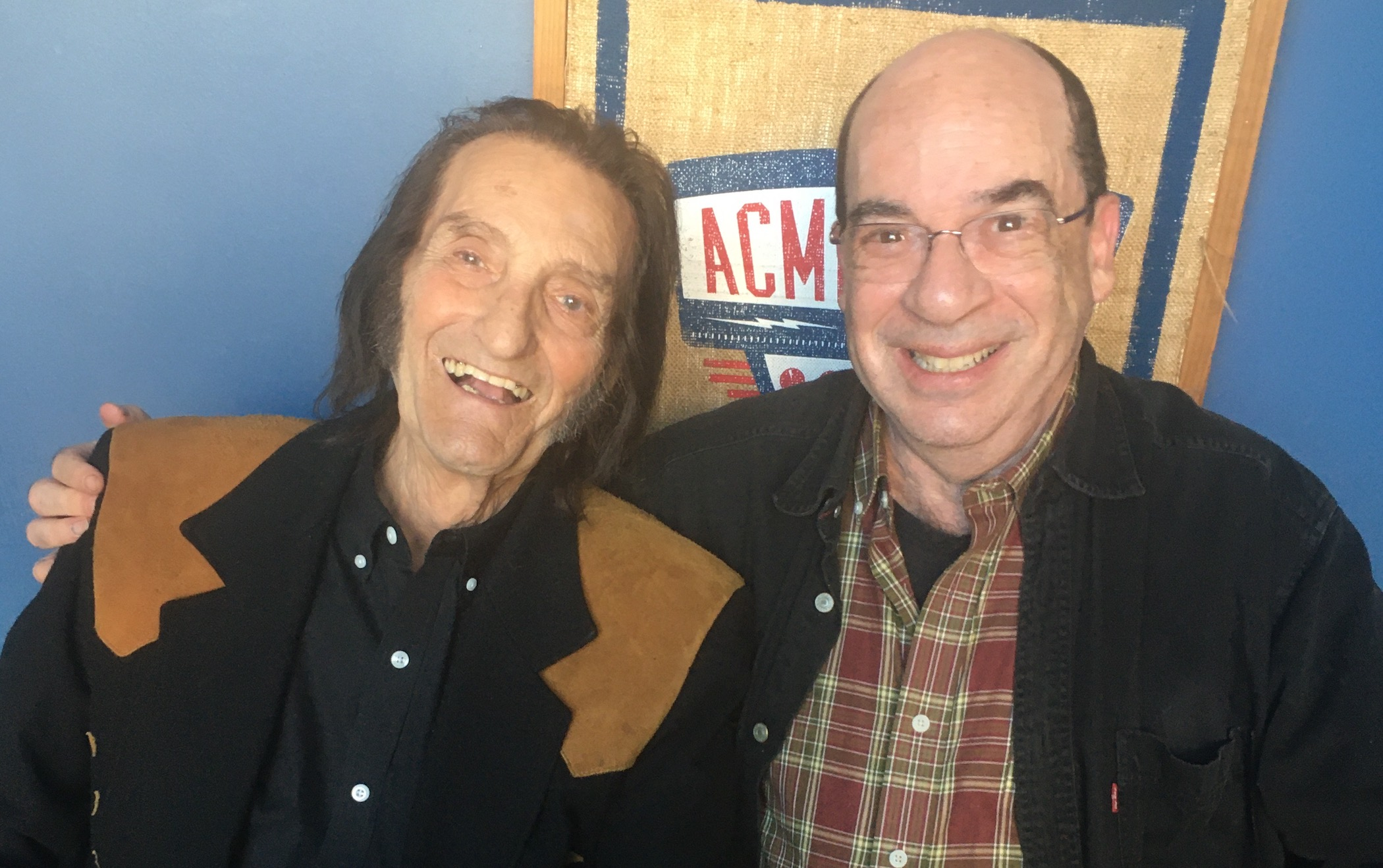
Mazor (right) with Doug Kershaw, AcmeRadio, Nashville 2019.

Barry Mazor is the author of "Blood Harmony: The Everly Brothers Story." His book Ralph Peer and the Making of Popular Roots Music was winner of Belmont University's Best Book on Country Music award in 2016, and his "Meeting Jimmie Rodgers: How America's Original Roots Music Hero Changed the Pop Sounds of a Century" won the same award in 2010. He has written regularly for the Wall Street Journal since 2003, and he is a former senior editor and columnist for No Depression magazine. He was the host of the streaming radio show "Roots Now," on Nashville's AcmeRadioLive.

== Writing ==
In addition to the Wall Street Journal and No Depression, his writing has appeared in [Crawdaddy (magazine)], the Oxford American, the Washington Post, the Village Voice, Nashville Scene, American Songwriter, The New Republic, and the Journal of Country Music. He was awarded the Charlie Lamb Award for Excellence in Country Music Journalism in 2008. He lives in Nashville, Tennessee.

== Bibliography ==
- Ralph Peer and the Making of Popular Roots Music, 2015, ISBN 9781613736531
- Connie Smith: Just for What I Am, 2012, ISBN 9783899166385
- Meeting Jimmie Rodgers, 2009, ISBN 0199891869
- Connie Smith: Latest Shade of Blue, 2021″
- Blood Harmony: The Everly Brothers Story." 2025 Da Capo Books. ISBN 9781668649756
