= Lollipop (Lil Wayne song) =

2008 single by Lil Wayne

Single by Lil Wayne featuring Static Major

from the album Tha Carter III
- Released: March 13, 2008
- Recorded: 2007
- Genre: Dirty rap; pop rap; Southern hip-hop; R&B; electropop
- Length: 5:05 (explicit album version); 4:07 (clean album version); 2:47 (UK radio edit)
- Label: Cash Money; Universal Motown
- Songwriters: Dwayne Carter; Stephen Garrett; Darius Harrison; James Scheffer; Rex Zamor; Marcus Cooper
- Producers: Deezle; Jim Jonsin

Lil Wayne singles chronology
"Push" (2008)	"Lollipop" (2008)	"A Milli" (2008)

Static Major singles chronology
"Bus Stop Breezy" (2006)	"Lollipop" (2008)

Music video
- "Lollipop" on YouTube

"Lollipop" is a song by American rapper and singer Lil Wayne posthumously featuring fellow American singer Static Major. A dirty rap song with hip house, trap and R&B elements, it was released on March 13, 2008 as the lead single from the former's sixth studio album Tha Carter III. The track, which heavily utilizes the Auto-Tune vocal effect, was produced by American record producers Deezle and Jim Jonsin and features lyrics about sexual desire and oral sex. A remixed version with a guest appearance from American rapper Kanye West, as well as featuring new verses from Lil Wayne, was released as a bonus track for the album on iTunes.

"Lollipop" became the most successful song by both artists, as it spent five non-consecutive weeks atop the US Billboard Hot 100. Static Major died on February 25, 2008, approximately two weeks before the song's release, making it the eighth song to peak the chart after the death of a credited artist. It received diamond certification by the Recording Industry Association of America (RIAA) for selling ten million units in the United States and was ranked the number one hip hop song of 2008 by MTV. The song reached number one on the 2008 issue of Notarized by BET. The song was ranked at number five on Rolling Stone's list of the 100 Best Songs of 2008. With 9.1 million copies sold as of January 2009, "Lollipop" was named 2008's best-selling digital single worldwide by IFPI.

== Music video ==
Lil Wayne in the music video for "Lollipop."

The music video for the song was directed by Gil Green and filmed in Las Vegas at Gavin Maloof's residence on December 31, 2007. He also filmed at 1700 East Flamingo Road in Las Vegas. The video premiered via BET's Access Granted on March 12, 2008. It also reached number one on TRL in April on MTV.

The limousine that Wayne and Static get into at the start of the video is based on an International XT pickup truck.

The video is the most-viewed video on Music Choice's video on demand service.

Jim Jonsin, Tyga, Jay Rock, Birdman and Mack 10 make cameos in the video.

The final frame of the video is a picture of Static praying with the words "In memory of Stephen "Static Major" Garrett".

== Chart performance ==
The song won a Grammy Award at the 51st Annual Grammy Awards for Best Rap Song.

Static Major died unexpectedly during a medical procedure on February 25, 2008, sixteen days before the song was released. "Lollipop" jumped 76 spots from number 85 to number 9 on the March 28, 2008 issue of the Billboard Hot 100, becoming Lil' Wayne's highest-charting single as a lead artist, along with being his first top ten hit on the chart as a lead artist. His previous highest-charting position as a lead artist was with "Go D.J.", which peaked at number 14 in 2004. The following week, it reached a new peak of number 7 on the Hot 100. The single reached a new peak of number 2 on the Billboard Hot 100 on April 17, 2008, making it his highest-charting single as both a lead artist or as a featured performer. (Lil Wayne was a featured artist for Destiny's Child's number 3 (Hot 100) hit, "Soldier".) For the week of May 3, 2008, "Lollipop" reached the number-one spot on the Hot 100, his first number one on the chart. It is also Wayne's first number one on the Hot R&B/Hip-Hop Songs chart and the Hot Rap Tracks chart. On the Hot R&B/Hip-Hop Songs chart, it is the first rap song to reach number one since Ludacris' "Money Maker" in 2006. After one week, it slipped away from top spot, but returned three weeks later, making it the song with the longest break in between peaks in the Hot 100 since Usher's "U Got It Bad."

The week after the release, Wayne and Mariah Carey became the number one most added and greatest gainer at both radio formats with a total of 138 adds. "Lollipop" has become a crossover hit on mainstream radio, as it became his first top 40 hit as a lead artist, entering at number 36, and has so far peaked at number 5. It is his first top ten on the Pop 100, where it has reached number two. It returned to number one on the Billboard Hot 100 for the second time on May 22, 2008.

The song has become a top ten success in Canada, peaking at number 10 as of May 29, 2008, and his most successful song in the UK, where it reached number 26 on downloads alone. It reached number 3 on the New Zealand charts and was certified double Platinum by the Recording Industry Association of New Zealand.

In 2008, "Lollipop" was the best-selling ringtone in the United States with over 2.3 million copies sold and the second best-selling digital song with over 3.1 million copies.

To date, "Lollipop" sold 4,176,000 digital copies in the United States.

== Remixes and covers ==
The song was officially remixed featuring vocals from Static Major and a verse from American rapper Kanye West. There is an extended version of the remix that has Wayne talking over the original bridge and singing an altered hook, with West singing adlibs, along with a guitar solo near the end. Other remixes feature Young Jeezy, Gorilla Zoe, Ace Hood, Kurupt, V.I.C., Nicki Minaj, Wiz Khalifa, Tekitek, Rasheeda and Khia, who made a popular female version of the song. Another remix was made commemorating the 2008 NBA champion Boston Celtics. It features the instrumental used in the main song.

David Banner's song "Shawty Say" samples the opening part of the Lil Wayne's second verse for its chorus. JJ uses elements of "Lollipop" in their song "Ecstasy". Wayne's protégé Drake samples this song on his song "In My Feelings" from his fifth studio album, Scorpion.

== Charts ==
=== Weekly charts ===
Chart performance for "Lollipop"
Chart (2008)	Peak position
Australia (ARIA)	32
Austria (Ö3 Austria Top 40)	44
Belgium (Ultratip Bubbling Under Flanders)	6
Belgium (Ultratip Bubbling Under Wallonia)	12
Canada Hot 100 (Billboard)	10
Czech Republic Airplay (ČNS IFPI)	18
Denmark (Tracklisten)	33
France Airplay (SNEP)	34
Germany (GfK)	22
Ireland (IRMA)	28
Netherlands (Dutch Top 40)	31
Netherlands (Single Top 100)	39
New Zealand (Recorded Music NZ)	3
Norway (VG-lista)	14
Scottish Singles Sales (Official Charts)	23
Sweden (Sverigetopplistan)	29
Switzerland (Schweizer Hitparade)	39
UK Singles (Official Charts)	26
US Billboard Hot 100	1
US Hot R&B/Hip-Hop Songs (Billboard)	1
US Pop Airplay (Billboard)	5
US Hot Rap Songs (Billboard)	1
US Rhythmic Airplay (Billboard)	1

Chart (2013)	Peak position
France (SNEP)	196

=== Year-end charts ===
2008 year-end chart performance for "Lollipop"
Chart (2008)	Position
Canada (Canadian Hot 100)	39
UK Singles (OCC)	133
UK Urban (Music Week)	11
US Billboard Hot 100	4
US Hot R&B/Hip-Hop Songs (Billboard)	6
US Mainstream Top 40 (Billboard)	33
US Rhythmic (Billboard)	2
Worldwide (IFPI)	1

=== Decade-end charts ===
2009 decade-end chart performance for "Lollipop"
Chart (2000–2009)	Position
US Billboard Hot 100	39

== Certifications ==
Region	Certification	Certified units/sales
Australia (ARIA)	2× Platinum	140,000^{‡}
Brazil (Pro-Música Brasil)	2× Platinum	120,000^{‡}
Denmark (IFPI Danmark)	Gold	45,000^{‡}
Germany (BVMI)	Gold	150,000^{‡}
New Zealand (RMNZ)	2× Platinum	60,000^{‡}
United Kingdom (BPI)	Platinum	600,000^{‡}
United States (RIAA)	Diamond	10,000,000^{‡}
United States (RIAA) Mastertone	5× Platinum	5,000,000^{*}
^{*} Sales figures based on certification alone.^{‡} Sales+streaming figures based on certification alone.

== Release history ==
Release dates and formats for "Lollipop"
Region	Date	Format	Label(s)	Ref.
United States	April 22, 2008	Mainstream airplay	Universal Motown	

== Framing Hanley cover ==
"Lollipop"

Single by Framing Hanley

from the album The Moment
- Released: 2008
- Recorded: 2008
- Genre: Hard rock; alternative rock
- Length: 3:07
- Label: Silent Majority; Universal
- Songwriters: Dwayne Carter; Stephen Garrett; Darius Harrison; Jim Jonsin; Rex Zamor
- Producer: Framing Hanley

Framing Hanley singles chronology
"Hear Me Now" (2007)	"Lollipop" (2008)	"Hear Me Now (re-release)" (2009)

The post-hardcore band Framing Hanley covered the song as a bonus track on their album The Moment. It uses a slight bit of talkbox, but replaces almost all the other sound with electric guitar, and features a hard rock version of the lyrics sung by the band. It was certified Gold by the Recording Industry Association of America for shipping 500,000 units in the United States.

Chart (2008–09)	Peak position
US Billboard Hot 100	82
US Alternative Airplay (Billboard)	22
US Mainstream Rock (Billboard)	27
US Pop 100 (Billboard)	62

=== Certifications ===
Region	Certification	Certified units/sales
United States (RIAA)	Gold	500,000^{^}
^{^} Shipments figures based on certification alone.

== See also ==
- List of Hot 100 number-one singles of 2008 (U.S.)
- List of number-one R&B/hip-hop songs of 2008 (U.S.)
- List of Billboard Rhythmic number-one songs of the 2000s
