= Drew Correa =

- Born: Andrew Correa; February 22, 1984 (age 42); Florianópolis, Brazil
- Origin: Miami, Florida, United States
- Genre: Hip hop
- Occupations: Record producer, songwriter, DJ
- Instruments: Drums, Keyboard, Sampler, Drum machine
- Years active: 2004–present

Andrews Correa (born February 22, 1984), professionally known as Drew Correa, is a Brazilian-born American music producer from Miami, Florida. Born in Florianópolis, Correa moved to the United States at the age of four, and began his career in the hip hop industry at the age of 16, when he worked as a disc jockey. Graduating Full Sail University with a degree in Recording Arts in 2003, Drew subsequently worked as an engineer for American recording artists including Trina, Pitbull, Swizz Beatz, Rick Ross, Shakira, Juelz Santana, Wyclef Jean. While engineering, Correa found an interest in producing. In 2005, he became Young Money Entertainment and Cash Money Records' resident engineer, having worked on albums such as Lil Wayne's Tha Carter II, Lil Wayne and Birdman's Like Father Like Son, and Birdman Five Star Stunna. While recording these projects, Wayne and Birdman became aware of Correa's interests in producing, and in June 2007, Correa decided to leave engineering. Initially struggling with relatively little work as a producer, Correa received his first major label placement, Lil Wayne's "Mr. Carter", featuring American rapper and mogul Jay-Z. Drew Correa received a Grammy Award in 2009, for Best Rap Album, because of his work with Wayne.
