= Got Money =

2008 single by Lil Wayne featuring T-Pain

Single by Lil Wayne featuring T-Pain

from the album Tha Carter III
- Released: May 27, 2008
- Recorded: 2008
- Length: 4:04 (album version); 2:38 (UK radio edit)
- Label: Cash Money; Universal Motown
- Songwriters: Dwayne Carter; Jermaine Preyan; Faheem Najm; Oscar Salinas; Juan Salinas
- Producers: Play-N-Skillz; T-Pain

Lil Wayne singles chronology
"Cuddy Buddy" (2008)	"Got Money" (2008)	"Mr. Carter" (2008)

T-Pain singles chronology
"Moon of Dreams" (2008)	"Got Money" (2008)	"What It Is (Strike a Pose)" (2008)

Music video
- "Got Money" on YouTube

"Got Money" is a song by American rapper Lil Wayne featuring American singer and rapper T-Pain, released as the third single from the former's sixth studio album Tha Carter III (2008). Both artists use the Auto-Tune effect in the song. The single was released as a digital download on iTunes on May 27, 2008. Lil Wayne and T-Pain performed the song at the 2008 BET Awards and the 2008 MTV Music Video Awards. MTV also ranked the song as the number 19 Hip-Hop song of 2008.

The UK radio edit version, released by Universal Ireland, removes the intros and the outros of the song, reducing the duration to 2:38.

== Music video ==
The official remix, featuring Young Money Entertainment artist Mack Maine, was used to make the music video. The video was shot and released on June 23, 2008, the same day the video for "A Milli" was shot, in Los Angeles and is a follow-up to the cliffhanger of "A Milli." The video is directed by Gil Green. Lil Wayne has claimed on his video blog it was based on the film Inside Man. Ray J, Shorty Mack, Dennis Garr, James Evans, Nicki Minaj, Birdman, Tyga, Brisco, Lil Twist, Lil Chuckee, Jay Rock, 2 Chainz, Kidd Kidd, and the producers of the song, Play-n-Skillz, make cameos in the video. The bank lobby shots are the same bank used in the film Set It Off. The music video premiered on multiple MTV channels on June 23, 2008. In the end, Lil Wayne is the only one arrested while the crew escapes with the money, including Mack Maine and Birdman.

== Covers ==
The song was covered by Korn vocalist Jonathan Davis. The cover features Slipknot and ex-Stone Sour guitarist Jim Root and Korn drummer Ray Luzier and was released on Jonathan Davis' solo band website, and is available on iTunes.

== Remixes ==
There are multiple freestyles on the internet, such as the ones done by rappers Yung Joc and Pitbull. The official remix features Mack Maine.

Travis Barker recorded a remix to the song. Juelz Santana and Skull Gang Recorded a freestyle to the song entitled "What You Reppin?" and on the "Skull Gang Takeover" mixtape.

== Chart performance ==
The song was the "Hot Shot Debut" of the week on the Billboard Hot 100, entering at #13, making it one of Lil Wayne's highest debuts. This also made it his second highest peaking song in his solo career, although it's now his third highest peaking. 15 weeks following its Hot 100 debut, the song rose to a new peak on the chart of #10, giving Lil Wayne his third consecutive top ten hit from Tha Carter III. It has become his fifth top ten on Hot Rap Tracks, thus far peaking at #2. It has been most successful on U.S. Rhythmic stations, reaching number one on the Rhythmic Top 40. "Got Money" was nominated for the Best Rap/Sung Collaboration at the 51st Annual Grammy Awards.

== Lawsuit ==
In June 2011, producers Play-N-Skillz sued Lil Wayne for $1 million over the rights to the song.

== Charts ==
=== Charts ===
Chart (2008)	Peak position
Canada Hot 100 (Billboard)	33
Germany (GfK)	67
Netherlands (Single Top 100)	84
UK Singles (The Official Charts Company)	184
US Billboard Hot 100	10
US Hot R&B/Hip-Hop Songs (Billboard)	7
US Pop Airplay (Billboard)	33
US Hot Rap Songs (Billboard)	2
US Rhythmic Airplay (Billboard)	1

=== Year-end charts ===
Chart (2008)	Position
US Billboard Hot 100	40
US Hot R&B/Hip-Hop Songs (Billboard)	44
US Rhythmic (Billboard)	11

== Certifications ==
Region	Certification	Certified units/sales
United States (RIAA)	3× Platinum	3,000,000^{‡}
^{‡} Sales+streaming figures based on certification alone.
