= Mr. Carter =

Promotional single by Lil Wayne featuring Jay-Z

from the album Tha Carter III
- Released: July 1, 2008
- Genre: Hip hop
- Length: 5:16
- Label: Cash Money; Universal Motown
- Songwriters: Dwayne Carter, Jr.; Shawn Carter; Drew Correa; Marco Rodriguez; Sha Ron Prescott
- Producers: DJ Infamous; Andrews "Drew" Correa

"Mr. Carter" is a song by American rapper Lil Wayne featuring fellow American rapper Jay-Z, released on July 1, 2008, as a promotional single from the former's sixth album Tha Carter III (2008). Produced by DJ Infamous and Drew Correa, the title refers to the two artists' shared surname (Dwayne Carter and Shawn Carter, respectively), although the two are not related. In the song, Wayne borrows lyrics from Jay-Z's song "Lucky Me", from his 1997 album In My Lifetime, Vol. 1. Lil Wayne had said that this track is his favorite from Tha Carter III.

== Accolades ==
This song was nominated for Best Rap Performance by a Duo or Group at the 51st Grammy Awards.

== Charts ==
=== Weekly charts ===
Chart (2008)	Peak position
US Billboard Hot 100	62
US Hot R&B/Hip-Hop Songs (Billboard)	27
US Hot Rap Songs (Billboard)	13

=== Year-end charts ===
Chart (2008)	Position
US Hot R&B/Hip-Hop Songs (Billboard)	93

== Certifications ==
Region	Certification	Certified units/sales
United States (RIAA)	Platinum	1,000,000^{‡}
^{‡} Sales+streaming figures based on certification alone.
