= A Milli =

2008 single by Lil Wayne

Single by Lil Wayne

from the album Tha Carter III
- Released: April 23, 2008
- Recorded: 2007
- Genre: Hip hop
- Length: 3:41
- Label: Young Money; Cash Money; Universal Motown
- Songwriters: Dwayne Carter; Shondrae Crawford; Kamaal Fareed; Ali Shaheed Muhammad
- Producer: Bangladesh

Lil Wayne singles chronology
"Lollipop" (2008)	"A Milli" (2008)	"Love in This Club, Part II" (2008)

Music video
- "A Milli" on YouTube

"A Milli", occasionally abbreviated as "Milli", is a song by American rapper Lil Wayne. The song was released April 23, 2008, as the second official single from his sixth studio album, Tha Carter III. The song is built on a looped sample of "I Left My Wallet In El Segundo (Vampire Mix)" by A Tribe Called Quest.

== Background ==
The original version of this song leaked early on several mixtapes. Then, a second version, with the first verse from the album version, a verse from Cory Gunz and the final two verses from the original version, was leaked prior to the album version. "A Milli" was played several times when sampling the record before its release, and was originally slated to appear on Tha Carter III in multiple versions as "skit-like" tracks, featuring artists such as Tyga, Cory Gunz, Hurricane Chris, and Lil Mama though the tracks never made the final cut. They were rumored to appear on the re-release of Tha Carter III, until Wayne revealed that the aforementioned album would be a rap rock album called Rebirth with no connection to Tha Carter III. "A Milli" was ranked the number one hip hop song of 2008 by MTV. American singer and songwriter Beyoncé's 2009 song "Diva", from her 2008 album I am... Sasha Fierce was compared to Wayne's song, due to the beat, the bassline, the repetitive word "diva", as Wayne does with "a milli" and the same producer of both of the songs, Bangladesh.

== Critical reception ==
The song won the Best Rap Solo Performance at the 2009 Grammy Awards.

Blender ranked it the number one song of 2008.

Rolling Stone named it the 10th best song of 2008, the 63rd best song of the 2000s, and the 486th best song of all time.

Time critic Josh Tyrangiel named "A Milli" the number four song of 2008, and it was ranked as the number one song of 2008 in the MTV News Bigger Than the Sound poll.

Complex ranked its beat the 31st greatest hip hop beat of all time.

== Chart performance ==
"A Milli" peaked at number six on the Billboard Hot 100, making it Lil Wayne's second top ten and second-highest-peaking song on the chart as a lead artist at the time. It has reached number one on Hot R&B/Hip-Hop Songs, making it his second number-one song on that chart. It was also able to top the Hot Rap Tracks like his previous single "Lollipop". As of 2011, "A Milli" has sold 2,053,000 digital copies.

== Remixes ==
The official remix, dubbed "A Milli Freemix", was made by Wayne to thank his fans, celebrating his first week sale of one million copies of Tha Carter III. In the remix, Wayne also hinted at the production of Tha Carter IV.

An electronic remix by duo Sidepiece was released on January 13, 2023.

== Music video ==
The music video was shot on June 23, 2008, in Los Angeles, California, (the same day as the video for "Got Money").

The video premiered on 106 & Park July 2, 2008. It consists of Lil Wayne preparing for the shoot of his following single "Got Money". The video, which was directed by Dayo Harewood, Lil Wayne and Jeff Panzer, features appearances by Birdman (giving Wayne his brand new car for his record sales), Lil Twist, T-Streets, Gudda Gudda, Kidd Kidd, Drake and Brisco. The video was first remastered onto YouTube in 2022.

== Track listing ==
1. "A Milli" (Clean)
2. "A Milli" (Explicit)
3. "A Milli" (Instrumental)
4. "A Milli" (Acapella)

== Charts ==
=== Weekly charts ===
==== Original ====
Chart (2008)	Peak position
Canada Hot 100 (Billboard)	54
UK Singles (OCC)	163
US Billboard Hot 100	6
US Hot R&B/Hip-Hop Songs (Billboard)	1
US Hot Rap Songs (Billboard)	1
US Pop 100 (Billboard)	34
US Rhythmic Airplay (Billboard)	1

==== Sidepiece Remix ====
Chart (2023)	Peak position
US Hot Dance/Electronic Songs (Billboard)	16

=== Year-end charts ===
Chart (2008)	Position
US Billboard Hot 100	43
US Hot R&B/Hip-Hop Songs (Billboard)	14
US Rhythmic (Billboard)	25

== Certifications ==
Region	Certification	Certified units/sales
Germany (BVMI)	Gold	150,000^{‡}
United Kingdom (BPI)	Platinum	600,000^{‡}
United States (RIAA)	6× Platinum	6,000,000^{‡}
United States (RIAA) Mastertone	Platinum	1,000,000^{*}
^{*} Sales figures based on certification alone.^{‡} Sales+streaming figures based on certification alone.

== See also ==
- List of number-one R&B singles of 2008 (U.S.)
