= Deezle =

American producer

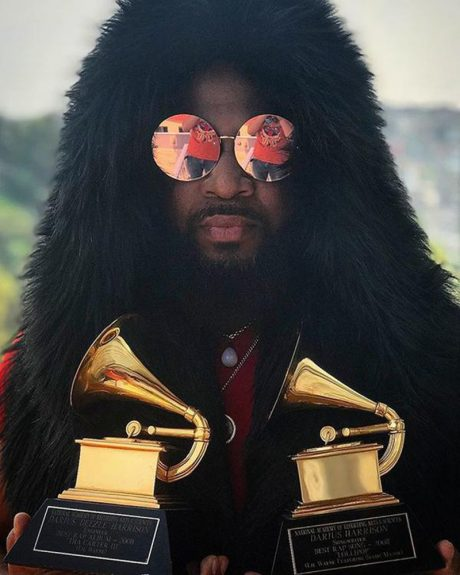
- Deezle poses with his 2009 Grammys for Best Rap Song and Best Rap Album

Background information
- Born: Darius Harrison; October 14
- Origin: New Orleans, Louisiana, U.S.
- Genres: Rap, hip hop, R&B, pop, gospel, pop punk, classical
- Occupations: Producer, rapper, singer
- Years active: 1989–present
- Label: Box Bangers Media

Darius Harrison, also known by his stage name as "DEEZLE", is an American record producer, rapper and singer.

== Music career ==
He was born and raised in New Orleans, Louisiana. Deezle has garnered many industry accolades for his creative works—including co-producing Lil Wayne's hit single "Lollipop", which led to a Grammy win alongside Jim Jonsin. From this, Deezle's credits, music contributions, and numerous artistic collaborations expanded significantly. This included co-authoring Drake's hit "In My Feelings," engineering Chris Brown's singles' "Gimme That" and "Graffiti," producing Lil Wayne's hit album and 3rd installation to his "Tha Carter" series "Tha Carter III," as well as sharing a co-producing credit with Kanye West on "Let the Beat Build." Ever since his start as a producer, engineer and artist in the music industry, he has sold over seventy-five million records. In addition to records, Deezle has also made musical contributions alongside Donald Harrison to movie scores such as Right to Return and Rachel Getting Married by Academy Award–winning filmmaker Jonathan Demme.

== Legal issues ==
In 2011, Deezle filed a lawsuit against Young Money Entertainment and Cash Money Records claiming he is owed millions.

== Awards and nominations ==
=== 2008 ===
- Best Rap Song-Songwriter-"Lollipop" by Lil Wayne
- Best Rap Album-Producer-"Tha Carter III" by Lil Wayne
