= The Time of My Life (David Cook song) =

Single by David Cook
- Released: May 22, 2008
- Recorded: 2008
- Genre: Pop rock
- Length: 3:36
- Label: RCA; 19
- Songwriter: Regie Hamm
- Producer: Steve Lipson

David Cook singles chronology
"The Time of My Life" (2008)	"Light On" (2008)

"The Time of My Life" is the debut single by American singer-songwriter David Cook, released through RCA Records and 19 Entertainment on May 22, 2008 after Cook won the seventh season of American Idol. It was written by Regie Hamm and produced by Steve Lipson. The song is included as a bonus track on his self-titled debut major-label album.

"The Time of My Life" debuted at number three on the Billboard Hot 100 and at number two on the Billboard Canadian Hot 100. The song was a success at adult radio, peaking at number seven on the Adult Pop Songs chart and at number one on the Adult Contemporary, holding the latter position for 15 non-consecutive weeks. It has been certified Platinum by RIAA and has sold over 1.4 Million copies in the US as of October 2012. "The Time of My Life" was the best-selling Idol coronation single between 2009 and 2012 before being overtaken by Phillip Phillips's "Home".

== Background ==
The song is the winner out of thousands of entries for the 2008 American Idol Songwriter's Competition, and was written by Regie Hamm. It was released as Cook's first single exclusively on iTunes on May 22, 2008. The next day, it was made available at all digital retailers. The song was sent to the radio stations following the end of the airing of American Idol finale in Hawaii.

On the 2008 ESPY's the song was used. The song was also used at the end of 2008 Summer Olympics opening ceremony on August 8, 2008 by NBC to recap the events that took place during the opening ceremonies. It has also been used throughout the Olympics to recap the days victories for the United States. This song was also used for a Viennese Waltz on So You Think You Can Dance season 4, performed by Courtney G. and Mark; and a Viennese Waltz on So You Think You Can Dance Canada season 2, performed by Corynne and Anthony.

In June 2009, in the ABC soap opera One Life to Live, the Llanview school chorus sang the song.

== Commercial performance ==
In the U.S., the song debuted on the Billboard Hot 100 chart dated June 7, 2008 at number three with 236,000 copies sold in its first week of release. These figures give it the strongest first week sales of an Idol coronation single since season 2. Due to low first-week airplay in the U.S., the song was prevented from debuting at number one by Lil Wayne's "Lollipop" featuring Static Major and Leona Lewis's "Bleeding Love". In addition to its high opening week sales, "The Time of My Life" showed strong sales longevity, and has passed the one-million mark in digital sales. The song's sales and radio longevity allowed it to stay in the top 50 on the Hot 100 for nineteen weeks, before being removed from the chart after its twentieth week per Billboard chart recurrent rules.

On June 1, 2008, the single entered the UK Singles Chart at number 61. It also debuted in New Zealand at number 29. The song debuted at number two on the Canadian Hot 100, blocked by Madonna's "4 Minutes".

"The Time of My Life" entered the Billboard Adult Contemporary chart dated June 7, 2008. It reached number one in its sixteenth week on the chart dated September 20, 2008, breaking a 36-week streak of number one adult contemporary songs by female artists. The song ceded the top spot to "Bleeding Love" for two weeks before returning to number one on the chart dated October 11, 2008. It remained atop the AC chart for ten straight weeks. During the holiday season, Faith Hill's "A Baby Changes Everything" commanded the chart for three weeks, but "The Time of My Life" returned to the top for four additional weeks in January 2009, bringing the song's total to 15 non-consecutive weeks at number one. The song enjoyed one of the longest runs at number one on the chart for a male artist, with Cook being only the fifteenth solo male to reach the top position. Cook is the second American Idol winner to top the adult contemporary chart, and the fourth contestant from the show to top it. The song additionally reached a peak position of seven on the Adult Pop Songs chart and at number 28 on the Pop Songs chart. It is only the second coronation single of an American Idol winner to reach the top 40 on U.S. mainstream radio, following Kelly Clarkson's "A Moment Like This", which reached number four.

The RIAA certified "The Time of My Life" Platinum on December 12, 2008 for selling over 1 million digital downloads, making it the second platinum-selling coronation song for an American Idol winner, after Kelly Clarkson's "A Moment Like This". It became the best selling coronation song by June 2009, which distinction it held until 2012, when season 11 winner Phillip Phillips's "Home" sold over 2 million digital copies. As of October 2012, "The Time of My Life" has sold 1,463,000 copies in the US.

== Charts ==
=== Weekly charts ===
Chart (2008–09)	Peak position
Canada (Canadian Hot 100)	2
Canada AC (Billboard)	5
Canada Hot AC (Billboard)	23
Finland (Suomen virallinen singlelista)	10
New Zealand (Recorded Music NZ)	29
UK Singles (OCC)	61
US Billboard Hot 100	3
US Adult Contemporary (Billboard)	1
US Adult Pop Airplay (Billboard)	7
US Pop Airplay (Billboard)	28

=== Year end charts ===
Chart (2008)	Position
Canadian Hot 100	75
US Billboard Hot 100	69
US Adult Contemporary (Billboard)	8
US Adult Pop Songs (Billboard)	26
US Digital Songs (Billboard)	65
Chart (2009)	Position
US Adult Contemporary (Billboard)	9

=== Decade end charts ===
Chart (2000–2010)	Position
US Adult Contemporary (Billboard)	23

== Certifications and sales ==
Region	Certification	Certified units/sales
United States (RIAA)	Platinum	1,463,000

== Acclaims ==
"The Time of My Life" took Song of the Year honors at the Nashville Music Awards October 7, 2009. Billboard has declared it "...one of the longest–running chart–toppers by a solo male artist in AC history." The hit single has joined the ranks of selected Nashville–penned songs that have achieved remarkable success at the number one spot, including Elvis' "Heartbreak Hotel" in 1956. The song hit the number one spot on the Billboard Hot AC chart fifteen times, passing the fourteen-week mark that Whitney Houston hit with Dolly Parton's "I Will Always Love You" in 1993.

== See also ==
- List of Billboard Adult Contemporary number ones of 2008 and 2009 (U.S.)
