= List of Billboard Mainstream Top 40 number-one songs of 2008 =

The Mainstream Top 40 chart ranks the top-performing singles on contemporary hit radio, compiled by Nielsen SoundScan based collectively on each single's weekly airplay, and published in Billboard magazine. The following are the songs which reached number one on the chart during the year 2008 in chronological order.

During 2008, a total of 14 singles hit number-one on the charts.

== Chart history ==
Issue date	Song	Artist(s)	Ref.
January 5	"Apologize"	Timbaland presents OneRepublic	
January 12	"No One"	Alicia Keys	
January 19	"No One"	Alicia Keys	
January 26	"No One"	Alicia Keys	
February 2	"No One"	Alicia Keys	
February 9	"No One"	Alicia Keys	
February 16	"Low"	Flo Rida featuring T-Pain	
February 23	"Low"	Flo Rida featuring T-Pain	
March 1	"Low"	Flo Rida featuring T-Pain	
March 8	"Low"	Flo Rida featuring T-Pain	
March 15	"Low"	Flo Rida featuring T-Pain	
March 22	"Low"	Flo Rida featuring T-Pain	
March 29	"With You"	Chris Brown	
April 5	"With You"	Chris Brown	
April 12	"Love Song"	Sara Bareilles	
April 19	"Love Song"	Sara Bareilles	
April 26	"Love Song"	Sara Bareilles	
May 3	"Bleeding Love"	Leona Lewis	
May 10	"Bleeding Love"	Leona Lewis	
May 17	"Bleeding Love"	Leona Lewis	
May 24	"Bleeding Love"	Leona Lewis	
May 31	"Bleeding Love"	Leona Lewis	
June 7	"Bleeding Love"	Leona Lewis	
June 14	"Bleeding Love"	Leona Lewis	
June 21	"Bleeding Love"	Leona Lewis	
June 28	"Bleeding Love"	Leona Lewis	
July 5	"Take a Bow"	Rihanna	
July 12	"Take a Bow"	Rihanna	
July 19	"Take a Bow"	Rihanna	
July 26	"Leavin'"	Jesse McCartney	
August 2	"Leavin'"	Jesse McCartney	
August 9	"Leavin'"	Jesse McCartney	
August 16	"Leavin'"	Jesse McCartney	
August 23	"Leavin'"	Jesse McCartney	
August 30	"Forever"	Chris Brown	
September 6	"Forever"	Chris Brown	
September 13	"Forever"	Chris Brown	
September 20	"Forever"	Chris Brown	
September 27	"Forever"	Chris Brown	
October 4	"Disturbia"	Rihanna	
October 11	"Disturbia"	Rihanna	
October 18	"Disturbia"	Rihanna	
October 25	"So What"	Pink	
November 1	"So What"	Pink	
November 8	"So What"	Pink	
November 15	"So What"	Pink	
November 22	"So What"	Pink	
November 29	"Hot n Cold"	Katy Perry	
December 6	"Hot n Cold"	Katy Perry	
December 13	"Hot n Cold"	Katy Perry	
December 20	"I'm Yours"	Jason Mraz	
December 27	"Live Your Life"	T.I. featuring Rihanna	

== See also ==
- 2008 in music
