= Joy to the World (Faith Hill album) =

Studio album by Faith Hill
- Released: September 30, 2008
- Recorded: 2005–08
- Studios: AIR (London, UK); Blackbird (Nashville, Tennessee); Capitol (Hollywood, California); Ocean Way (Hollywood, California); Ocean Way (Nashville, Tennessee); Sunset Sound (Hollywood, California)
- Genres: Christmas; country; big band
- Length: 36:48
- Label: Warner Bros. Nashville
- Producers: Byron Gallimore; Faith Hill; Dann Huff

Faith Hill chronology
| The Hits (2007) | Joy to the World (2008) | Deep Tracks (2016) |

Singles from Joy to the World
- 1. "A Baby Changes Everything" Released: September 2008

Professional ratings
Review scores
| Source | Rating |
|---|---|
| About.com | 4.5/5 stars |
| Allmusic | 2.5/5 stars |

Joy to the World is the first Christmas album and seventh studio album by American country music singer Faith Hill. It features the U.S. Adult Contemporary #1 hit, "A Baby Changes Everything". The album was certified Gold by RIAA on December 4, 2008, and as of November 2016, it has sold 762,000 copies in the US.

== Background ==
A couple of tracks from Joy to the World have been available as free downloads as part of special promotions. In late November, for a limited period of time, "Joy to the World" (single) was available for free digital download as part of a "holiday mixtape" created by Oprah Winfrey. For a week beginning on December 9, 2008, the song "O Holy Night was available for free digital download from iTunes as their "Holiday Single of the Week".

The album was also promoted by a concert appearance on PBS Soundstage. PBS said of the album,

"Working with producers Dann Huff and Byron Gallimore, engineer Allen Sides and Grammy-winning arranger David Campbell, Faith Hill has crafted a one-of-a-kind Christmas record with Joy to the World, freshly conceived yet anchored in tradition. It is a loving tribute to both the spirit and the music of Christmas, one that pays homage to the classics."

Two limited edition versions of the album with a bonus DVD were made available at Target and Walmart. The Target DVD features 40 minutes of live performance and interview from Hill's XM Artist Confidential concert that took place in October 2007. The Walmart DVD was made available in 2009, a year after the album's original release, and features 19 minutes of Soundcheck footage.

Excluding compilations and a collaboration with her husband Tim McGraw this album is Faith Hill's last studio album to date
https://tasteofcountry.com/faith-hill-appearance-pictures-2025-cma-fest/

== Track listing ==
| No. | Title | Writer(s) | Length |
|---|---|---|---|
| 1. | "Joy to the World" | Isaac Watts | 2:15 |
| 2. | "What Child Is This?" | William Chatterton Dix | 3:37 |
| 3. | "Santa Claus Is Coming to Town" | John Frederick Coots; Haven Gillespie | 2:46 |
| 4. | "The Little Drummer Boy" | Katherine Kennicott Davis; Henry Onorati; Harry Simeone | 3:06 |
| 5. | "O Come All Ye Faithful" | John Francis Wade | 3:47 |
| 6. | "Holly Jolly Christmas" | Johnny Marks | 2:16 |
| 7. | "Away in a Manger" | James Murray | 3:15 |
| 8. | "O Holy Night" | Adolphe Adam; Placide Cappeau | 4:59 |
| 9. | "Winter Wonderland" | Felix Bernard; Richard Smith | 2:39 |
| 10. | "Silent Night" | Franz Gruber | 3:11 |
| 11. | "A Baby Changes Everything" | Craig Wiseman; Tim Nichols | 4:52 |
| Total length: | | | 36:48 |

Target bonus DVD
| No. | Title | Length |
|---|---|---|
| 1. | "Wild One" |
| 2. | "Red Umbrella" |
| 3. | "Stronger" |
| 4. | "This Kiss" |
| 5. | "Cry" |
| 6. | "Breathe" |
| 7. | "Piece of My Heart" |

Walmart bonus DVD
| No. | Title | Length |
|---|---|---|
| 1. | "Little Drummer Boy" |
| 2. | "A Baby Changes Everything" |
| 3. | "Joy to the World" |
| 4. | "Winter Wonderland" |

== Personnel ==
- Sam Bacco - percussion
- Jeff Bailey - trumpet
- Beth Beeson - french horn
- Steve Brewster - percussion
- Tom Bukovac - electric guitar
- Paul Bushnell - bass guitar
- David Campbell - string arrangements, conductor
- Keith Carlock - drums
- Alvin Chea - background vocals
- Mike Compton - mandolin
- Eric Darken - percussion
- Matt Davich - saxophone
- Tim Davis - vocal contractor, background vocals
- Stuart Duncan - fiddle
- Chris Dunn - trombone
- Shannon Forrest - drums
- John Gilutin - piano
- Carl Gorodetzky - string contractor
- Barry Green - trombone
- Mike Haynes - trumpet
- Faith Hill - lead vocals
- Prentiss Hobbs - trombone
- Dann Huff - electric guitar
- Pete Huttlinger - acoustic guitar
- Jack Jezzro - bass guitar
- Charlie Judge - keyboards
- Jennifer Kummer - french horn
- Lee Levine - clarinet
- Sam Levine - saxophone
- London Oratory School Schola - boys choir
- Gilbert Long - tuba
- Jim Lotz - bassoon
- David Loucks - background vocals
- Chris McDonald - trombone
- Jerry McPherson - electric guitar
- Metro Voices - choir
- Jeff Meyer - french horn
- Doug Moffet - saxophone
- The Nashville String Machine - strings
- Craig Nelson - bass guitar
- Jimmy Nichols - keyboards
- Jenny O'Grady - choir director
- Steve Patrick - trumpet
- Darryl Phinnessee - background vocals
- Ann Richards - flute
- Eric Rigler - tin whistle, uilleann pipes
- Bettie Ross - pipe organ
- David Schnaufer - dulcimer
- Robbie Shankle - saxophone
- Buddy Skipper - saxophone
- Calvin Smith - french horn
- Denis Solee - saxophone
- Ron Sorbo - percussion
- Neil Stubenhaus - bass guitar
- Bryan Sutton - acoustic guitar
- Bobby G. Taylor - oboe
- George Tidwell - trumpet
- Glenn Worf - upright bass
- Jonathan Yudkin - cello, celtic harp, fiddle, viola

== Release history ==
| Country | Date |
|---|---|
| United States | September 30, 2008 |
| Italy | November 28, 2008 |

== Charts ==
=== Weekly charts ===
| Chart (2008) | Peak position |
|---|---|
| US Billboard 200 | 13 |
| US Top Country Albums (Billboard) | 2 |
| US Top Holiday Albums (Billboard) | 2 |

=== Year-end charts ===
| Chart (2008) | Position |
|---|---|
| US Top Country Albums (Billboard) | 69 |
| Chart (2009) | Position |
| US Billboard 200 | 79 |
| US Top Country Albums (Billboard) | 17 |

Singles – Billboard (North America)

| Year | Single | Chart | Position |
|---|---|---|---|
| 2008 | "A Baby Changes Everything" | Hot Adult Contemporary Tracks | 1 |
| 2008 | "A Baby Changes Everything" | Hot Country Songs | 36 |
| 2008 | "A Baby Changes Everything" | Hot 100 | 105 |
| 2008 | "Joy to the World" | Hot Country Songs | 44 |
| 2008 | "Santa Claus Is Coming to Town" | Hot Country Songs | 53 |
| 2008 | "Little Drummer Boy" | Hot Country Songs | 58 |
| 2009 | "O Come All Ye Faithful" | Hot Country Songs | 60 |

== Certifications ==
| Region | Certification | Certified units/sales |
|---|---|---|
| United States (RIAA) | Gold | 500,000^{^} |
^{^} Shipments figures based on certification alone.
