= A Thousand Years (Tom Dice song) =

Single by Tom Dice

from the album Teardrops
- Released: 20 September 2010
- Recorded: 2010
- Genre: Pop
- Length: 4:00
- Label: SonicAngel
- Songwriter: Tom Eeckhout
- Producers: Tom Eeckhout; Tom Helsen

Tom Dice singles chronology
"Lucy" (2010)	"A Thousand Years" (2010)	"Il nous faut" (2011)

"A Thousand Years" is a song performed by Belgian singer-songwriter Tom Dice from his debut album Teardrops. It was released on 20 September 2010 as a digital download and on 3 January 2011 as a CD single. It peaked at number 44 on the Ultratop 50 chart in Belgium.

== Track listing ==
Digital download
No.	Title	Lyrics	Producer(s)	Length
1.	"A Thousand Years"	Tom Dice	Tom Dice; Tom Helsen	4:00

CD single
No.	Title	Lyrics	Producer(s)	Length
1.	"A Thousand Years"	Tom Dice	Tom Dice; Tom Helsen	4:00
2.	"Broken"	Tom Dice	Tom Dice; Erhan Kurkun	3:55

== Credits and personnel ==
- Lead vocals – Tom Dice
- Producer – Tom Dice, Tom Helsen
- Music – Tom Dice, Tom Helsen
- Lyrics – Tom Dice
- Label: SonicAngel

== Chart performance ==
Chart (2010)	Peak position
Belgium (Ultratop 50 Flanders)	44

== Release history ==
Region	Date	Format	Label
Belgium	20 September 2010	Digital download	SonicAngel
Belgium	3 January 2011	CD single	SonicAngel
