= Bottle It Up =

Single by Sara Bareilles

from the album Little Voice
- Released: April 29, 2008
- Recorded: 2007
- Studio: NRG Recording Studios (Los Angeles, CA)
- Genre: Pop rock
- Length: 3:01 (album version); 3:21 (radio edit)
- Label: Epic
- Songwriter: Sara Bareilles
- Producer: Eric Rosse

Sara Bareilles singles chronology
"Love Song" (2007)	"Bottle It Up" (2008)	"Winter Song" (2008)

"Bottle It Up" is a song by American singer and songwriter Sara Bareilles. Written by Bareilles and produced by Eric Rosse, it was released as the second single from her 2007 album Little Voice on April 29, 2008. Following its release, it reached became a top twenty hit on the Billboard Adult Alternative Songs and Adult Top 40 charts, peaking at numbers 16 and 15 respectively, while also reaching the top forty in the Netherlands. On August 20, 2013, the song was certified gold by the Recording Industry Association of America (RIAA).

== Background ==
Bareilles has stated that she wrote "Bottle It Up" prior to her signing to Epic Records in about 2003, while pondering about the potential consequences of signing to a record label, along with her "hopes and fears about what it would feel like." She discarded the unfinished song until a year prior to the recording of her album Little Voice, when the song, as she said, "spoke to me again and sort of wrote itself as it was the answer to all my worries and I wrote it for love and it put to rest a lot of anxieties I had previously."

In an interview with the Minneapolis Star Tribune, she further explained that the song's lyrical content focuses on the music business and, more specifically, the struggles of being an artist with a record contract, stating: "Before I had a record deal, I wrote that song about what it would be like to have a record deal, and the struggles of how do you become an artist who feels like they haven't quote/unquote 'sold out,' and how do you stay true to your art and figure out how to make a living from it... The chorus says it all: 'I do it for love.' Music – and particularly songwriting – for me is such a passion, it’s a very sacred thing for me."

== Music video ==
The official music video for "Bottle It Up" was directed by Marcos Siega and released on April 9, 2008. The video features Bareilles with different kinds of pianos and keyboards in different settings, and stated that the video is meant to symbolize how music is an important part of people's lives.

== Track listing ==
- CD single (United Kingdom)
1. "Bottle It Up" (radio edit) – 3:21
2. "In Your Eyes" (live) – 5:24

== Charts ==
Chart (2008)	Peak position
Netherlands (Dutch Top 40)	33
US Bubbling Under Hot 100 (Billboard)	7
US Adult Alternative Airplay (Billboard)	16
US Adult Pop Airplay (Billboard)	15
US Pop Airplay (Billboard)	31

== Certifications ==
Region	Certification	Certified units/sales
United States (RIAA)	Gold	500,000^{‡}
^{‡} Sales+streaming figures based on certification alone.

== Release history ==
Region	Date	Format	Label
United States	March 10, 2008	Adult album alternative radio	Epic
United States	April 21, 2008	Hot adult contemporary radio	Epic
United States	April 29, 2008	Contemporary hit radio	Epic
United Kingdom	September 29, 2008	Compact disc	Epic
