= List of Billboard Adult Contemporary number ones of 2008 =

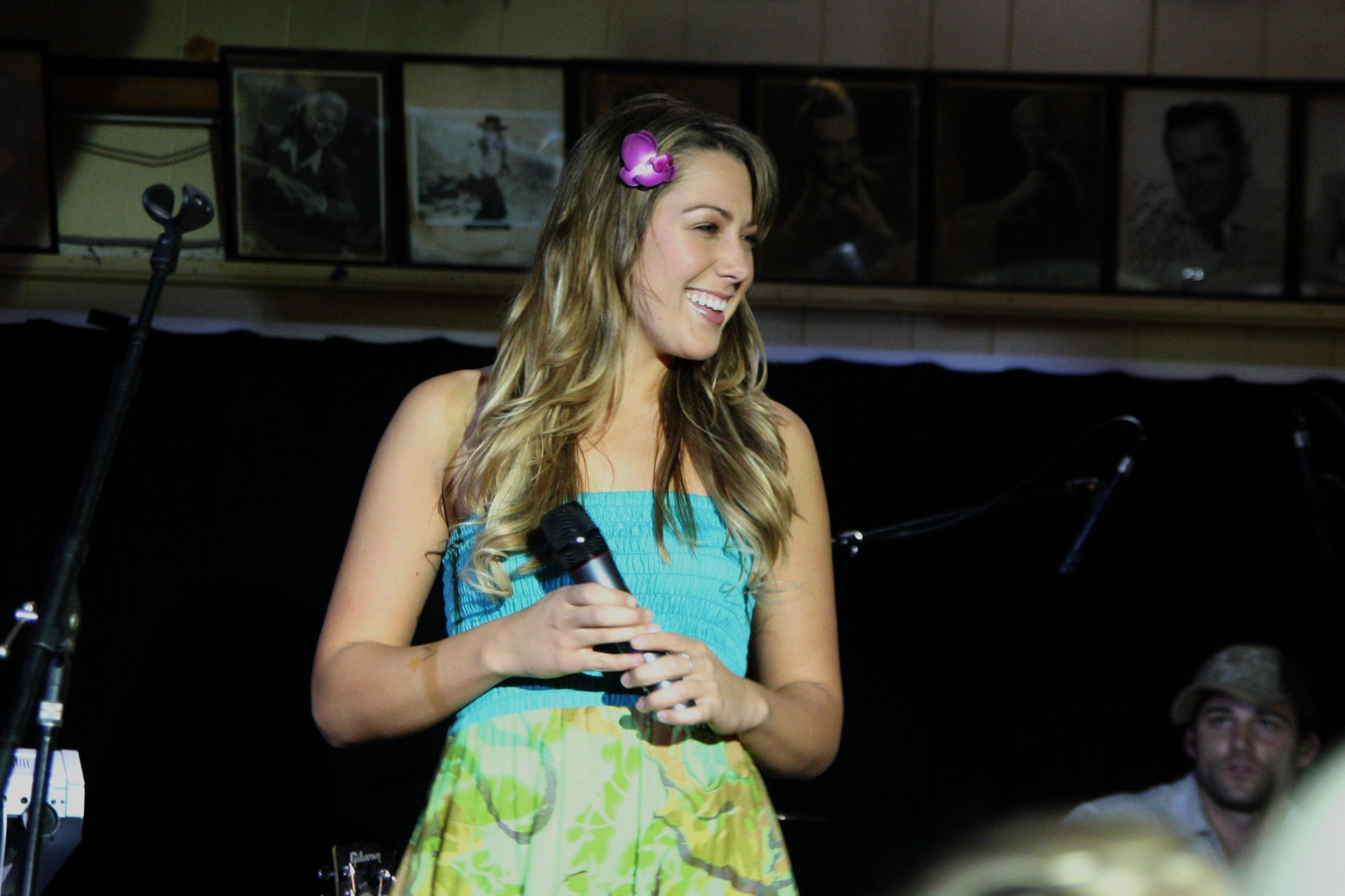
"Bubbly" by Colbie Caillat was the year's longest-running number one, topping the chart for 19 weeks.

Adult Contemporary is a chart published by Billboard ranking the top-performing songs in the United States in the adult contemporary music (AC) market. In 2008, six different songs topped the chart in 52 issues of the magazine, based on weekly airplay data from radio stations compiled by Nielsen Broadcast Data Systems.

At the start of the year Josh Groban was at number one with "I'll Be Home for Christmas", retaining the top spot from the final chart of 2007. The song was Groban's fifth track to reach number one on the Adult Contemporary chart. The following week, Colbie Caillat replaced Groban in the top spot with "Bubbly". The song went on to spend 19 consecutive weeks atop the chart, the highest number of weeks spent at number one by a song during the year. As no artist had more than one chart-topper during 2008, it also meant that Caillat was the artist with the most weeks in the top spot during the year. "Bubbly" was the debut single for Caillat, who had gained a major-label recording contract after achieving popularity on social media site MySpace.

In the issue of Billboard dated May 24, Sara Bareilles replaced Caillat at number one with her song "Love Song", which went on to spend 13 consecutive weeks at number one, before being replaced by "Bleeding Love" by Leona Lewis, the winner of the 2006 season of British TV talent show The X Factor. To date, "Bleeding Love", which also topped Billboard's all-genre singles chart, the Hot 100, is the British's singer's only song to reach number one on the Adult Contemporary chart. Another TV contest winner, American Idol season 7 winner David Cook, reached number one on the chart dated September 20 with "The Time of My Life", the "coronation single" released immediately after his victory in the competition. Cook's arrival in the top spot brought to an end an unbroken 36-week occupation of the number-one position by female vocalists. After a single week at number one, "The Time of My Life" was replaced in the top spot for two weeks by "Bleeding Love", but in early October Cook's single returned to number one and remained there for ten consecutive weeks. On the chart dated December 20, Faith Hill replaced Cook at number one with "A Baby Changes Everything", which spent the last two weeks of 2008 at number one.

== Chart history ==
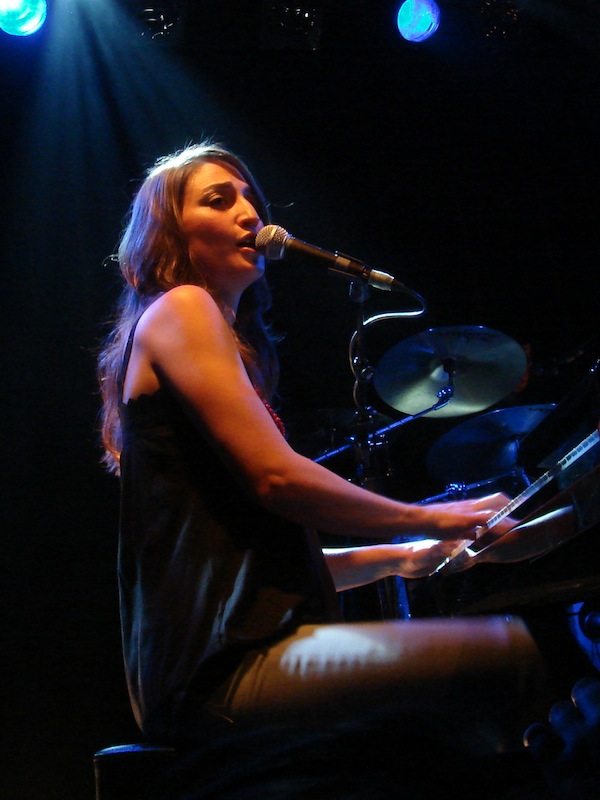
Sara Bareilles spent a total of 15 weeks at number one with "Love Song".

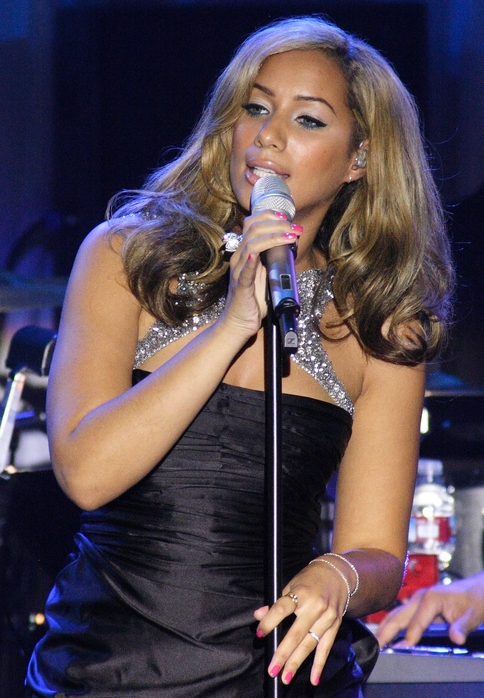
"Bleeding Love" was a chart-topper for British singer Leona Lewis.

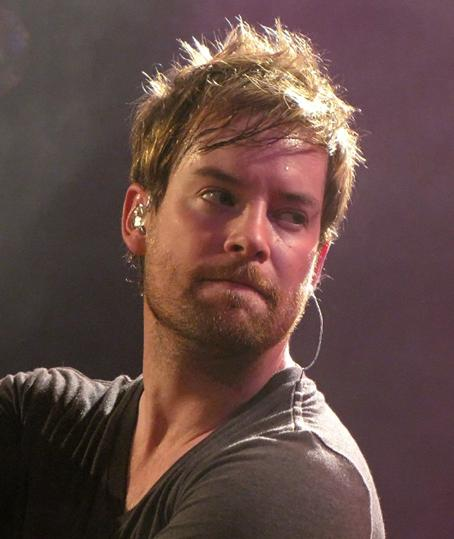
American Idol winner David Cook topped the chart with "The Time of My Life".

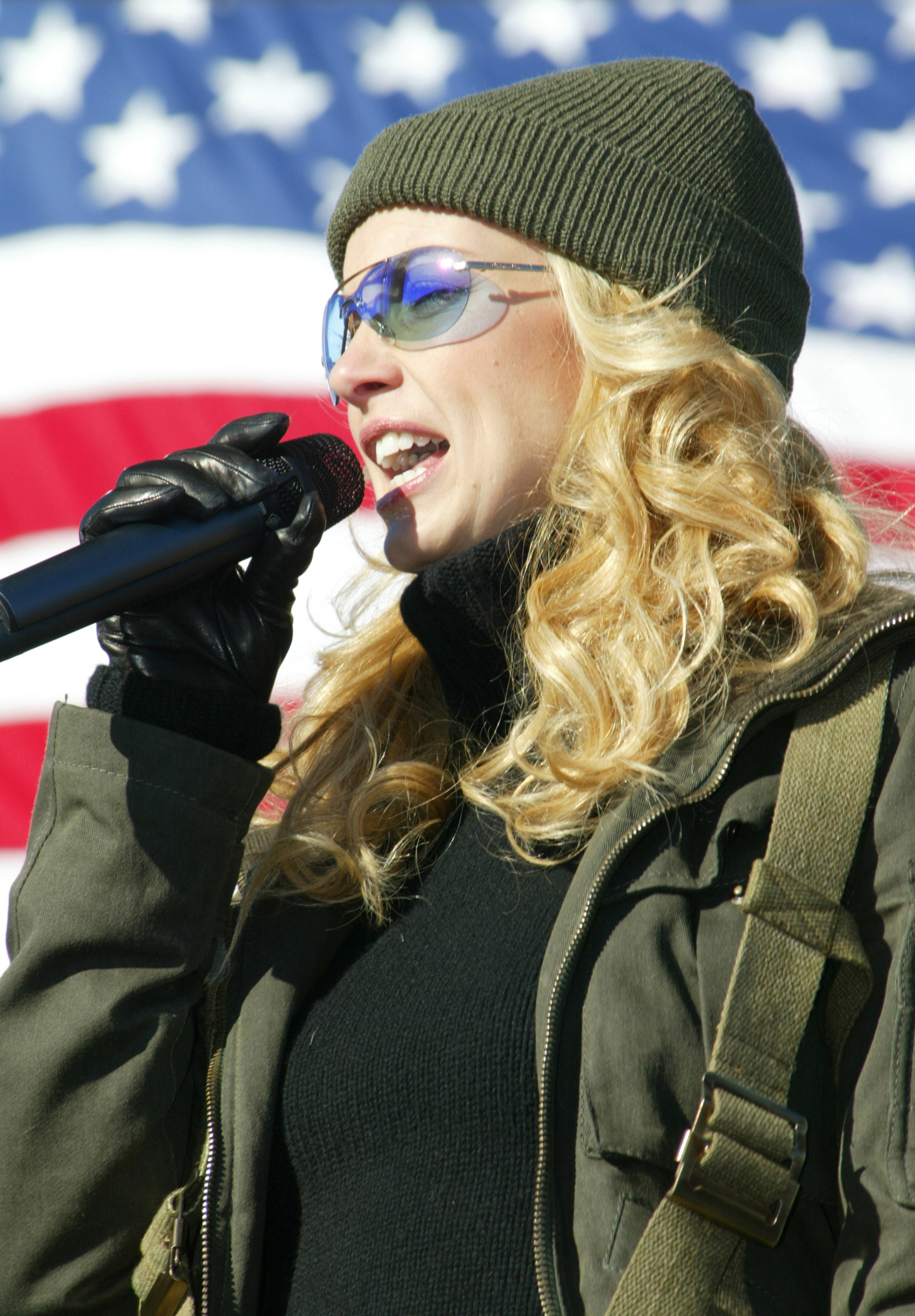
American country artist Faith Hill topped the chart for the first time since 2003 with "A Baby Changes Everything" which spent the final weeks of 2008 at the top of the chart.

Key
†	Indicates best-performing AC song of 2008

Issue date	Title	Artist(s)	Ref.
January 5	"I'll Be Home for Christmas"	Josh Groban	
January 12	"Bubbly"	Colbie Caillat	
January 19	"Bubbly"	Colbie Caillat	
January 26	"Bubbly"	Colbie Caillat	
February 2	"Bubbly"	Colbie Caillat	
February 9	"Bubbly"	Colbie Caillat	
February 16	"Bubbly"	Colbie Caillat	
February 23	"Bubbly"	Colbie Caillat	
March 1	"Bubbly"	Colbie Caillat	
March 8	"Bubbly"	Colbie Caillat	
March 15	"Bubbly"	Colbie Caillat	
March 22	"Bubbly"	Colbie Caillat	
March 29	"Bubbly"	Colbie Caillat	
April 5	"Bubbly"	Colbie Caillat	
April 12	"Bubbly"	Colbie Caillat	
April 19	"Bubbly"	Colbie Caillat	
April 26	"Bubbly"	Colbie Caillat	
May 3	"Bubbly"	Colbie Caillat	
May 10	"Bubbly"	Colbie Caillat	
May 17	"Bubbly"	Colbie Caillat	
May 24	"Love Song" †	Sara Bareilles	
May 31	"Love Song" †	Sara Bareilles	
June 7	"Love Song" †	Sara Bareilles	
June 14	"Love Song" †	Sara Bareilles	
June 21	"Love Song" †	Sara Bareilles	
June 28	"Love Song" †	Sara Bareilles	
July 5	"Love Song" †	Sara Bareilles	
July 12	"Love Song" †	Sara Bareilles	
July 19	"Love Song" †	Sara Bareilles	
July 26	"Love Song" †	Sara Bareilles	
August 2	"Love Song" †	Sara Bareilles	
August 9	"Love Song" †	Sara Bareilles	
August 16	"Love Song" †	Sara Bareilles	
August 23	"Bleeding Love"	Leona Lewis	
August 30	"Love Song" †	Sara Bareilles	
September 6	"Bleeding Love"	Leona Lewis	
September 13	"Love Song" †	Sara Bareilles	
September 20	"The Time of My Life"	David Cook	
September 27	"Bleeding Love"	Leona Lewis	
October 4	"Bleeding Love"	Leona Lewis	
October 11	"The Time of My Life"	David Cook	
October 18	"The Time of My Life"	David Cook	
October 25	"The Time of My Life"	David Cook	
November 1	"The Time of My Life"	David Cook	
November 8	"The Time of My Life"	David Cook	
November 15	"The Time of My Life"	David Cook	
November 22	"The Time of My Life"	David Cook	
November 29	"The Time of My Life"	David Cook	
December 6	"The Time of My Life"	David Cook	
December 13	"The Time of My Life"	David Cook	
December 20	"A Baby Changes Everything"	Faith Hill	
December 27	"A Baby Changes Everything"	Faith Hill	

== See also ==
- 2008 in music
- List of artists who reached number one on the U.S. Adult Contemporary chart
