= Little Voice (album) =

Studio album by Sara Bareilles
- Released: July 3, 2007
- Studio: Capitol Studios (Los Angeles); Sunset Sound Recorders (Los Angeles); NRG Recording Studios (Los Angeles)
- Genre: Pop
- Length: 49:01
- Label: Epic
- Producer: Eric Rosse

Sara Bareilles chronology
Careful Confessions (2004)	Little Voice (2007)	Kaleidoscope Heart (2010)

Singles from Little Voice
- 1. "Love Song" Released: June 19, 2007; 2. "Bottle It Up" Released: April 29, 2008; 3. "Gravity" Released: February 3, 2009

Professional ratings
Review scores
Source	Rating
AllMusic	3.5/5 stars
Digital Spy	(mixed)
PopMatters	8/10
Rolling Stone	3.5/5 stars

Little Voice is the second and major-label debut studio album by American singer-songwriter Sara Bareilles, which was released on July 3, 2007, on the Epic Records label. Six of the tracks are re-recorded studio versions of songs from her previous album, Careful Confessions. A two-disc special edition of Little Voice with live acoustic tracks was released on March 18, 2008. The bonus disc also includes an interview with Bareilles and accompanying videos of the performances.

"Love Song" was selected as the first single. It was featured as the iTunes Single of the Week for June 19–25, 2007. In 2008, "Bottle It Up" was released as the second single. The video was directed by Marcos Siega. The third single in the United States was supposed to be "Gravity", with the video released on February 3, 2009, but no further information was ever revealed as to the date of the single release.

The album was certified gold in February 2008, and platinum in 2011 by the Recording Industry Association of America (RIAA) for sales of over one million copies. At the 51st Grammy Awards, "Love Song" was nominated for Song of the Year and Best Female Pop Vocal Performance.

== Singles ==
"Love Song" was the album's lead single. Released in the United States on June 19, 2007, and in the UK and Europe in April 2008, it is Bareilles' most successful single, charting at number four in both the United States and the UK. "The River" (live) was released on January 1, 2008. Although not a mainstream release, "The River" is a live cover of Joni Mitchell's "River". "Bottle It Up" was the second official single, released in the United States on April 29, 2008. It did not gain as much popularity as "Love Song", and only charted on the Bubbling Under Hot 100 at number seven. It was released in the United Kingdom on October 13, 2008, but failed to make any impact on the charts, peaking at number 92. "Gravity" was supposed to be the third United States single from the album. The video was released online in February 2009 and appeared on VH1's top 20 countdown. The song also appears in the TV series Community, and plays during a montage (intended to be humorous) of lingering looks between the characters Annie and Jeff. This was inspired by a real life fanvid on YouTube featuring the pair that was well known amongst the cast and crew. The montage on the show was then instantly parodied using the song as backing for similar moments between the characters Abed and Pierce.

== Critical reception ==
The album was well received by critics. When asked in an interview by British newspaper The Daily Mirror about how she would describe her music, Bareilles said, "I guess I would say it's piano-based pop/soul," and said she listened to a lot of early soul and jazz when making the album.

"Love Song" was nominated for Song of the Year and Best Female Pop Vocal Performance at the 51st Grammy Awards.

== Commercial performance ==
Little Voice debuted at number 45 on the US Billboard 200 chart, selling 16,000 copies in its first week. After spending 20 weeks on the chart, the album reached its peak at number seven on the chart dated March 8, 2008, selling 37,000 copies. As of September 2010, the album has sold 997,000 copies in the US. On January 13, 2011, the album was certified platinum by the Recording Industry Association of America (RIAA) for sales of over one million copies in the United States.

In the United Kingdom, the album debuted at number nine on the UK Albums Chart, selling 14,484 copies in its first week. On July 22, 2013, the album was certified silver by the British Phonographic Industry (BPI) for sales of over 60,000 copies in the UK. In New Zealand, the album debuted at number 26, helped by "Love Song" reaching number one on the radio airplay chart.

== Track listing ==
All tracks are written by Sara Bareilles, except where noted.

No.	Title	Writer(s)	Length
1.	"Love Song"		4:18
2.	"Vegas"		4:07
3.	"Bottle It Up"		3:00
4.	"One Sweet Love"		4:20
5.	"Come Round Soon"		3:33
6.	"Morningside"		3:58
7.	"Between the Lines"		4:34
8.	"Love on the Rocks"	Bareilles, Javier Dunn	4:13
9.	"City"		4:33
10.	"Many the Miles"		5:11
11.	"Fairytale"		3:14
12.	"Gravity"		3:52
13.	"Any Way the Wind Blows" (Japan/Platinum MusicPass bonus track)
Total length:			49:01

Bonus acoustic tracks (2-disc edition)
No.	Title	Writer(s)	Length
1.	"Bottle It Up"		3:25
2.	"Love Song"		4:13
3.	"In Your Eyes"	Peter Gabriel	5:28
4.	"Many the Miles"		4:47
5.	"Gravity"		4:17
Total length:			22:10

All acoustic versions were recorded in 2008 as part of a live session for Stripped Music. The two-disc version also replaces the original version of "Bottle It Up" with the radio edit, which is renamed "Bottle It Up" (remix edit).

== Personnel ==
- Drums: Matt Chamberlain, Brian MacLeod
- Percussion: Rafael Padilla, Eric Ivan Rosse
- Bass guitar: Chris Chaney
- Piano: Sara Bareilles (tracks 1, 2, 4–7, 9, 11, 12), Jamie Muhoberac (tracks 3 and 8), Chris Joyner (track 10)
- Fender Rhodes: Sara Bareilles
- Mellotron: Eric Ivan Rosse
- Guitars: Stuart Mathis, Bruce Watson, Lyle Workman, Joel Shearer
- Acoustic guitar: Sara Bareilles
- Programming: Eric Ivan Rosse
- Cello: Cameron Stone
- String arrangements: Eric Ivan Rosse
- String arrangements: David Campbell
- Backing vocals: Javier Dunn, Josh Day (both on "Many The Miles"), Sara Bareilles ("Love Song")

=== Production ===
- Arranged, produced, recorded and mixed by Eric Rosse
- Basic tracks recorded and engineered by Howard Christopher Willing
- Vocals and overdubs recorded and engineered by Eric Rosse
- Assistant engineers: Dave Colvin (NRG Studios), Bill Mims (Sunset Sound Recorders), Charlie Paakari (Capitol Studios)

== Charts ==
=== Weekly charts ===
Chart (2008)	Peak position
Australian Albums (ARIA)	49
Austrian Albums (Ö3 Austria)	46
Belgian Albums (Ultratop Flanders)	43
Belgian Albums (Ultratop Wallonia)	43
Dutch Albums (Album Top 100)	31
French Albums (SNEP)	87
German Albums (Offizielle Top 100)	52
Irish Albums (IRMA)	36
Italian Albums (FIMI)	45
New Zealand Albums (RMNZ)	26
Swiss Albums (Schweizer Hitparade)	34
UK Albums (OCC)	9
US Billboard 200	7

=== Year-end charts ===
Chart (2008)	Position
US Billboard 200	47

== Certifications ==
Region	Certification	Certified units/sales
New Zealand (RMNZ)	Gold	7,500^{‡}
United Kingdom (BPI)	Silver	60,000^{*}
United States (RIAA)	2× Platinum	2,000,000^{‡}
^{*} Sales figures based on certification alone.^{‡} Sales+streaming figures based on certification alone.
