= Lucy (Tom Dice song) =

Single by Tom Dice

from the album Teardrops
- Released: 13 August 2010
- Recorded: 2010
- Genre: Pop
- Label: SonicAngel
- Songwriter(s): Tom Eeckhout; Tom Helsen
- Producer(s): Tom Eeckhout; Tom Helsen

Tom Dice singles chronology
"Me and My Guitar" (2010)	"Lucy" (2010)	"A Thousand Years" (2011)

"Lucy" is a song performed by Belgian singer-songwriter Tom Dice from his debut album Teardrops. It was released on 13 August 2010. It peaked to number 21 on the Belgian music chart Ultratop in the first week of October in 2010. A music video was made for the single and was uploaded to YouTube on 12 August 2010.

== Track listing ==
CD and Digital download
No.	Title	Lyrics	Producer(s)	Length
1.	"Lucy"	Tom Dice; Tom Helsen	Tom Dice; Tom Helsen	2:59
2.	"Murderer"	Tom Dice	Tom Dice; Erhan Kurkun	3:22

== Credits and personnel ==
- Lead vocals – Tom Dice
- Record producer – Tom Dice, Tom Helsen
- Music – Tom Dice, Tom Helsen
- Lyrics – Tom Dice, Tom Helsen
- Label: SonicAngel

== Charts ==
Chart (2010)	Peak position
Belgium (Ultratop 50 Flanders)	21

== Release history ==
Region	Date	Format	Label
Belgium	13 August 2010	Digital Download	SonicAngel
