= Love Song (Sara Bareilles song) =

2007 single by Sara Bareilles

Single by Sara Bareilles

from the album Little Voice
- B-side: "The River"
- Released: June 2007
- Studio: NRG Recording Studios (Los Angeles, California); Squawkbox Studios (New York City, New York)
- Length: 4:20 (album version); 3:53 (radio edit)
- Label: Epic
- Songwriter: Sara Bareilles
- Producer: Eric Rosse

Sara Bareilles singles chronology
| "Love Song" (2007) | "Bottle It Up" (2008) |

Music video
- "Love Song" on YouTube

Audio sample
- file; help

"Love Song" is a song by American singer-songwriter Sara Bareilles, released as her debut single in June 2007. Issued through Epic Records, it served as the lead single from her second album, Little Voice (2007). It was nominated for 2009 Grammy Awards in the categories Song of the Year and Best Female Pop Vocal Performance.

"Love Song" spent 19 weeks in the top ten and an overall 41 weeks on the Billboard Hot 100, peaking at number four there. Similarly, it peaked at number four on the UK Singles Chart and the Australian ARIA Charts. It also reached number one on the Canadian Hot 100, while topping the US Mainstream Top 40 airplay chart. It also spent many weeks atop the Hot Adult Pop Songs and Hot Adult Contemporary Tracks charts, ending up number one at the year-end tally of both charts.

== Background ==
Speaking of the song's origin in an interview with MTV, Bareilles said of her label, "They had encouraged me to keep writing, and I just wasn't having any luck. [...] I went to a rehearsal space one day. I sat down and wrote something for me. And 'Love Song' basically wrote itself. It's totally honest, and I'm very lucky the label liked it as well."

Later in 2011, she explained: "It was actually written for my record label. I had been turning in new music. I was getting the red light. I couldn't go into the studio yet because they were waiting for something. But they wouldn't [...] nobody said what they were waiting for. So I kept turning in new songs, thinking like, 'Is this what you want? Is this what you want?' And it was always a big thumbs down, and I ended up writing 'Love Song' out of frustration." In 2014, she stated it was "very tongue-in-cheek,” confirming it was a response to the record label pressuring her to make safe, "radio-friendly" songs.

== Chart performance ==
Featured initially as the free iTunes song of the week on June 16, 2007, the song was a sleeper hit, debuting a few months later at number 100 on the US Billboard Hot 100. After her appearance in a Rhapsody TV commercial, in which she performs "Love Song", it rocketed from number 72 to number 16 on the Hot 100 and from number 32 to number five on the Hot Digital Songs chart. In the first week of 2008, the song cracked the top 10 on the Hot 100, jumping to number nine, where it stayed for four non-consecutive weeks before reaching a peak of number four. In spite of not reaching the top three, "Love Song" managed to spend 19 weeks in the top 10, in contrast with other songs that reached higher peak but did not maintain such longevity. The single was certified six platinum by the RIAA for over six million in sales.

As of April 2014, the single had sold 3,717,000 digital copies in the United States. The song was listed at number seven on the Billboard Hot 100 year-end chart of 2008. It also topped both the Billboard Hot Adult Contemporary Tracks and Hot Adult Top 40 Tracks charts in 2008.

The song debuted on the UK Singles Chart at number 30 and later peaked at number four. The song debuted at number 100 on the Canadian Hot 100 the week of January 31, 2008, and reached number one on the chart the week of March 29, 2008. In Australia, "Love Song" peaked at number four during its ninth week on the country's chart. In New Zealand, it reached number seven on the RIANZ Singles Chart.

== Music video ==
Directed by Josh Forbes, the music video features a miniature Bareilles playing the piano inside a coin-operated jukebox that plays love songs. A steady stream of men and women enter the booth and insert coins to observe her through a pinhole as she plays the same song day after day. The lyrics express her growing frustration as she declares that she is "not gonna write you a love song today," whereupon Bareilles grabs the next coin that rolls inside, and uses it to jam the gears. The next morning, the owner of the booth (who was seen at the beginning of the video) enters; he notices that the jukebox has gone dark, and appears amazed when he discovers Bareilles inside the jukebox. He retrieves the jammed coin from the gears and hands it to Bareilles.

The music video features the album version of the song. The video also features British actor Adam Campbell as the owner of the booth.

== Charts ==
=== Weekly charts ===
| Chart (2007–2009) | Peak position |
|---|---|
| Australia (ARIA) | 4 |
| Austria (Ö3 Austria Top 40) | 18 |
| Belgium (Ultratop 50 Flanders) | 10 |
| Belgium (Ultratop 50 Wallonia) | 12 |
| Canada Hot 100 (Billboard) | 1 |
| Czech Republic Airplay (ČNS IFPI) | 35 |
| Denmark (Tracklisten) | 9 |
| Europe (Eurochart Hot 100) | 7 |
| Finland Download (Latauslista) | 27 |
| France Download (SNEP) | 22 |
| Germany (GfK) | 13 |
| Germany Airplay (BVMI) | 1 |
| Hungary (Rádiós Top 40) | 21 |
| Ireland (IRMA) | 5 |
| Italy (FIMI) | 11 |
| Mexico Anglo (Monitor Latino) | 1 |
| Netherlands (Dutch Top 40) | 5 |
| Netherlands (Single Top 100) | 17 |
| New Zealand (Recorded Music NZ) | 7 |
| Scottish Singles Sales (Official Charts) | 7 |
| Slovakia Airplay (ČNS IFPI) | 35 |
| Sweden (Sverigetopplistan) | 17 |
| Switzerland (Schweizer Hitparade) | 16 |
| UK Singles (Official Charts) | 4 |
| US Billboard Hot 100 | 4 |
| US Adult Alternative Airplay (Billboard) | 3 |
| US Adult Contemporary (Billboard) | 1 |
| US Adult Pop Airplay (Billboard) | 1 |
| US Pop Airplay (Billboard) | 1 |

=== Year-end charts ===
| Chart (2008) | Position |
|---|---|
| Australia (ARIA) | 37 |
| Belgium (Ultratop 50 Flanders) | 51 |
| Canada (Canadian Hot 100) | 22 |
| Canada AC (Billboard) | 4 |
| Canada Hot AC (Billboard) | 5 |
| Europe (Eurochart Hot 100) | 88 |
| Hungary (Rádiós Top 40) | 40 |
| Netherlands (Dutch Top 40) | 14 |
| Netherlands (Single Top 100) | 71 |
| Switzerland (Schweizer Hitparade) | 79 |
| UK Singles (OCC) | 55 |
| US Billboard Hot 100 | 7 |
| US Adult Contemporary (Billboard) | 1 |
| US Adult Top 40 (Billboard) | 1 |
| US Mainstream Top 40 (Billboard) | 9 |

| Chart (2009) | Position |
|---|---|
| Hungary (Rádiós Top 40) | 149 |
| US Adult Contemporary (Billboard) | 23 |

=== Decade-end charts ===
| Chart (2000–2009) | Position |
|---|---|
| US Billboard Hot 100 | 77 |

== Certifications ==
| Region | Certification | Certified units/sales |
|---|---|---|
| Australia (ARIA) | Platinum | 70,000^{^} |
| Canada (Music Canada) | Gold | 20,000^{*} |
| Denmark (IFPI Danmark) | Gold | 7,500^{^} |
| Italy | — | 48,307 |
| Italy (FIMI) Sales since 2009 | Gold | 50,000^{‡} |
| New Zealand (RMNZ) | 2× Platinum | 60,000^{‡} |
| United Kingdom (BPI) | Platinum | 600,000^{‡} |
| United States (RIAA) | 6× Platinum | 6,000,000^{‡} |
| United States (RIAA) Mastertone | Gold | 500,000^{*} |
^{*} Sales figures based on certification alone.^{^} Shipments figures based on certification alone.^{‡} Sales+streaming figures based on certification alone.

== Release history ==
Release dates and formats for "Love Song"
| Region | Date | Format | Label(s) | Ref. |
|---|---|---|---|---|
| United States | December 4, 2007 | Mainstream airplay | Epic | |

== See also ==
- List of Hot 100 number-one singles of 2008 (Canada)
- List of Mainstream Top 40 number-one hits of 2008 (U.S.)
- List of Billboard Adult Contemporary number ones of 2008
- List of Hot Adult Top 40 Tracks number-one singles of 2008
