= List of Billboard Adult Contemporary number ones of 2009 =

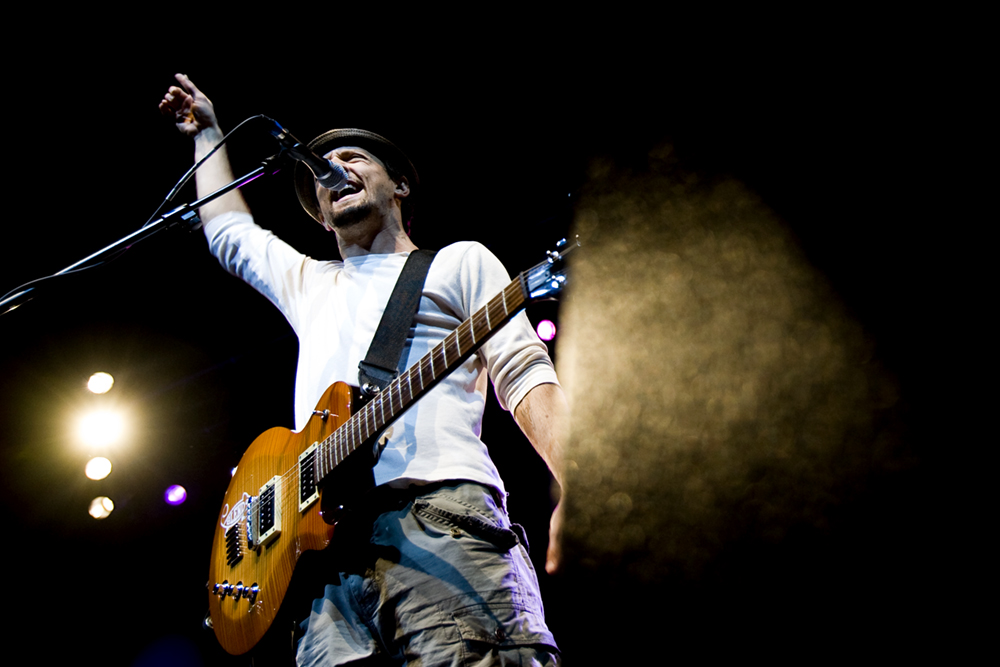
Jason Mraz spent 16 weeks at number one with "I'm Yours".

Adult Contemporary is a chart published by Billboard ranking the top-performing songs in the United States in the adult contemporary music (AC) market. In 2009, seven different songs topped the chart in 52 issues of the magazine, based on weekly airplay data from radio stations compiled by Nielsen Broadcast Data Systems.

At the start of the year, the number one position was held by Faith Hill with her song "A Baby Changes Everything", retaining its position from the final chart of 2008. It held the top spot for a single week in 2009 before being replaced by David Cook's song "The Time of My Life". Cook's song, his "coronation single" after winning the previous year's season of American Idol, had spent 11 weeks in the top spot in 2008 and thus finished with a total of 15 weeks at number one. Following Cook's run at number one, British band Coldplay topped the chart for a single week with "Viva La Vida", which won the Grammy Award for Song of the Year at the 51st Annual Grammy Awards held on February 8.

From mid-February on, only four songs topped the chart, spending 46 weeks between them at number one. In the issue of Billboard dated February 14, Jason Mraz's song "I'm Yours" reached number one, beginning a run of 16 consecutive weeks in the top spot, the longest of the year. The song built airplay gradually across various radio formats, and finally topped the AC chart a full year after its initial release in February 2008. Despite holding the top spot for four months, "I'm Yours" remains Mraz's only song to reach number one on the Adult Contemporary chart. In June, teenage country music singer Taylor Swift replaced Mraz in the top spot with "Love Story", her first AC number one. The song was released in two different versions to country and pop radio, a pattern repeated later in the year with her single "You Belong with Me", which also topped the AC chart. Following Swift's six-week run at number one, another teenage vocalist took the top spot as Miley Cyrus' "The Climb" began a run of 15 consecutive weeks atop the chart. Taken from the soundtrack of Hannah Montana: The Movie, in which she starred, "The Climb" was Cyrus' only song to reach number one on the Adult Contemporary chart until "Flowers" in 2023. Cyrus' run at number one ended in the issue of Billboard dated October 31, when Swift returned to the top spot with "You Belong with Me", making her the only artist to achieve two AC number ones in 2009. Swift's song held the number one position for the remainder of the year.

== Chart history ==
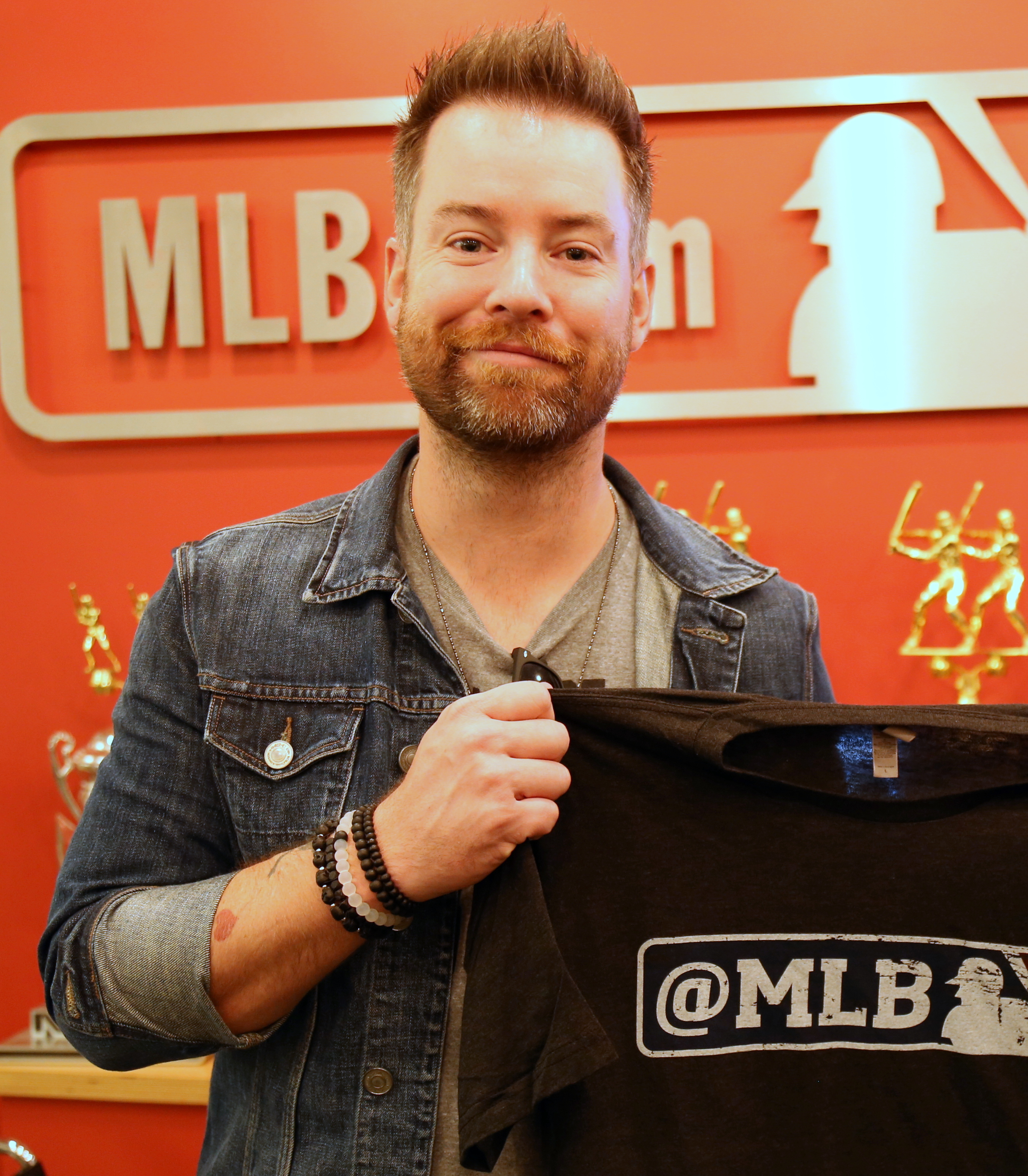
American singer David Cook spent four weeks at number one with his song "The Time of My Life".

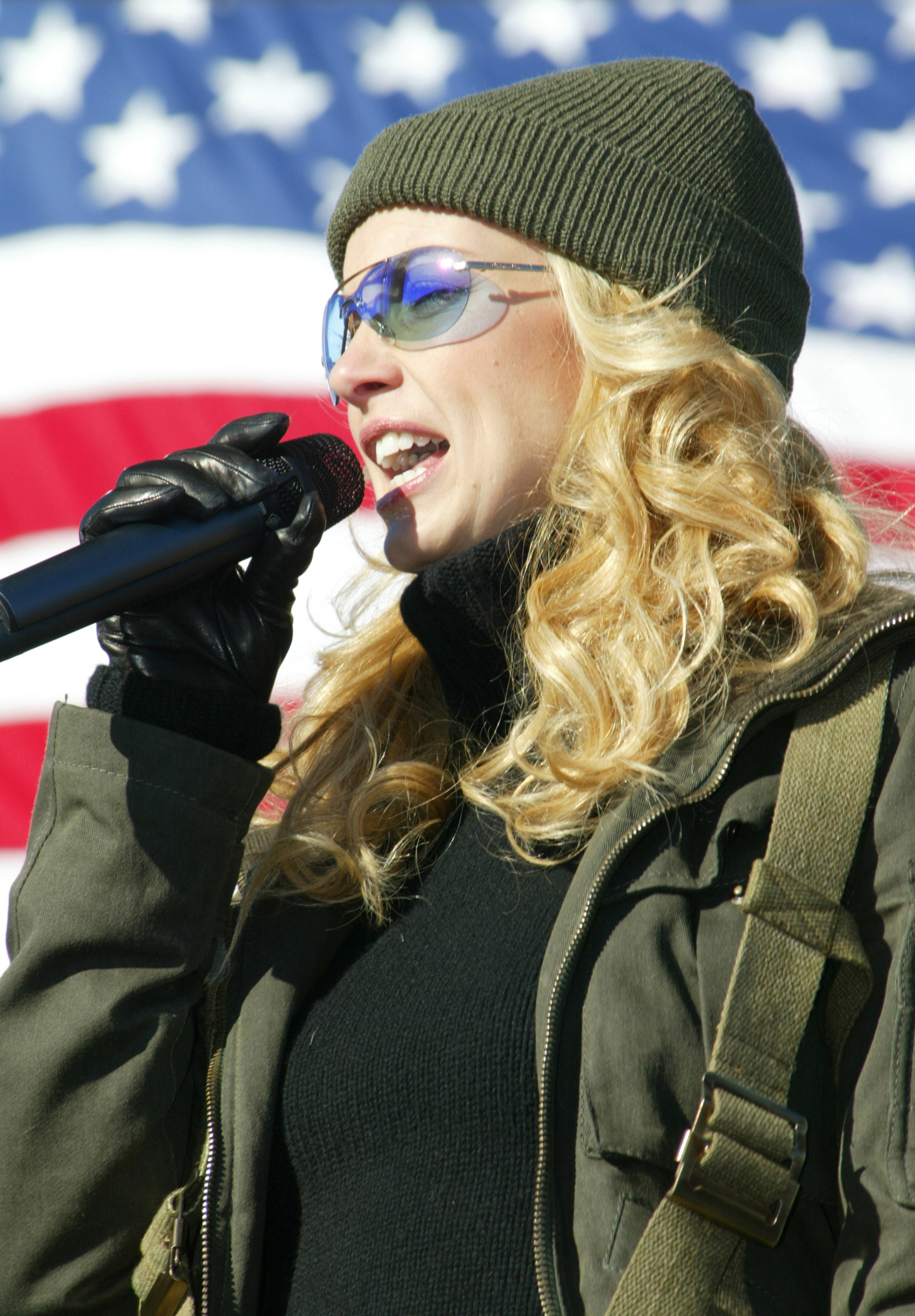
Faith Hill claimed the first number one on the chart in 2009 with "A Baby Changes Everything".

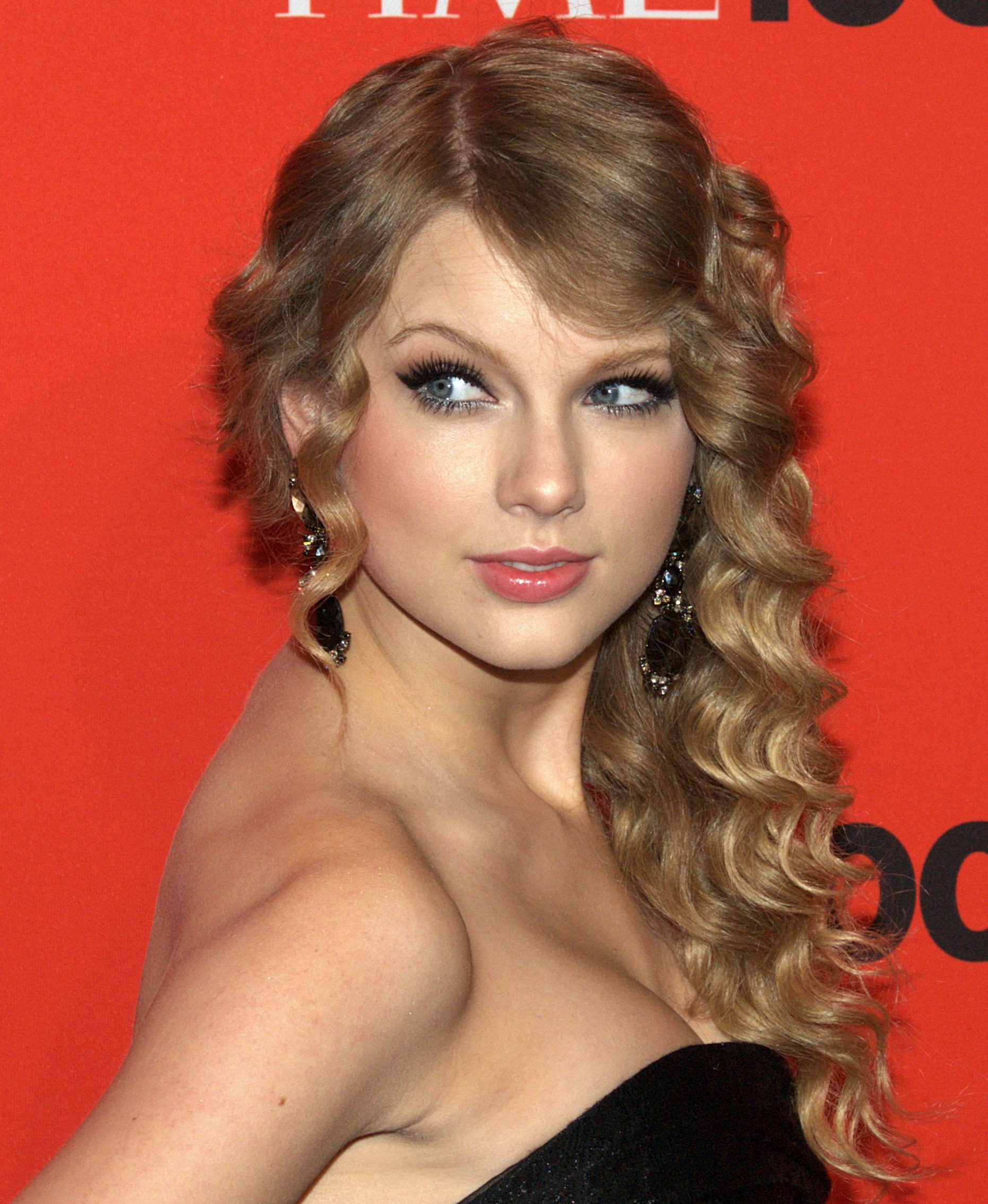
Taylor Swift topped the chart twice in 2009 with "Love Story" and "You Belong with Me".

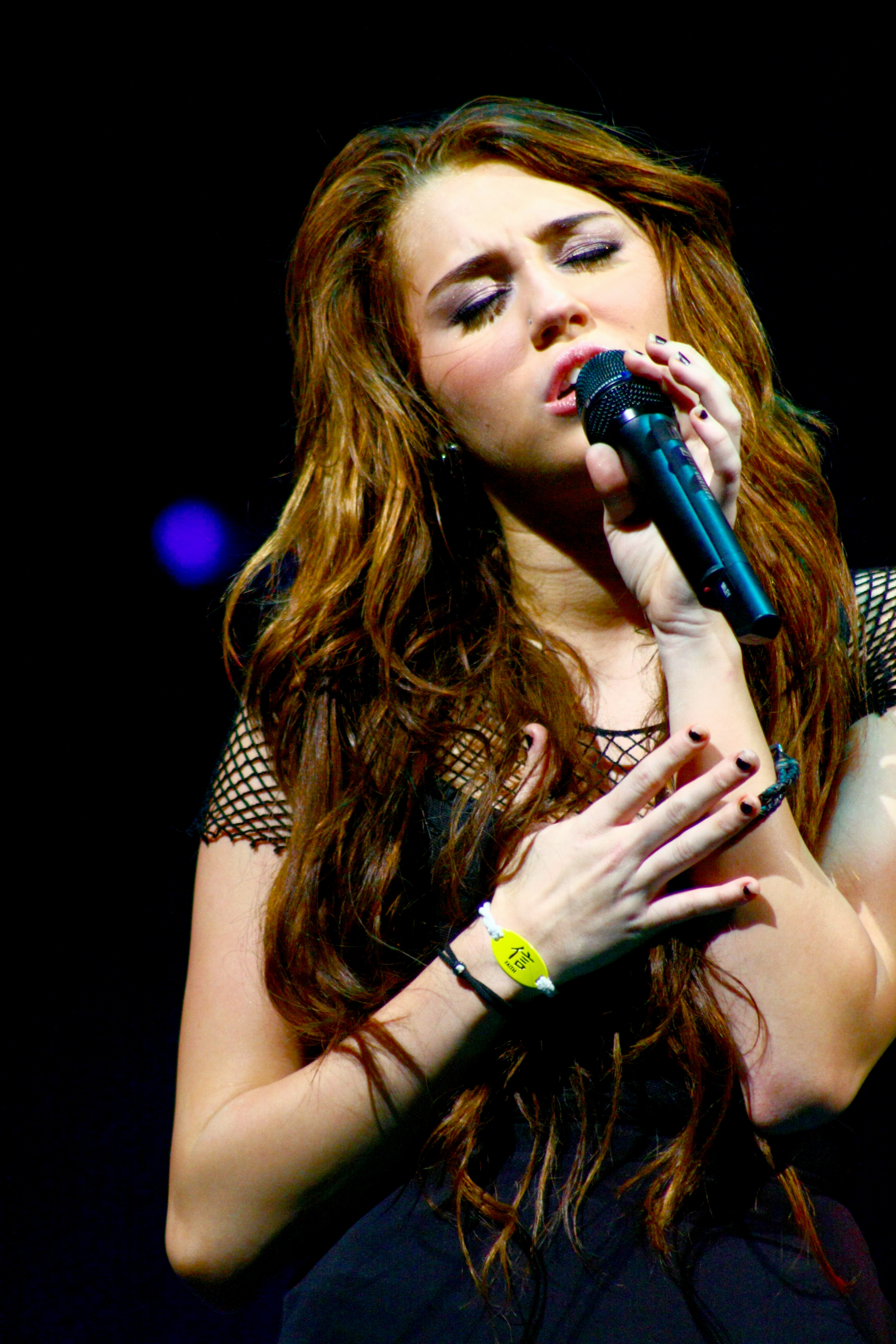
Miley Cyrus had a lengthy run at number one with "The Climb", from the soundtrack of her film Hannah Montana: The Movie.

Key
†	Indicates best-performing AC song of 2009

Issue date	Title	Artist(s)	Ref.
January 3	"A Baby Changes Everything"	Faith Hill	
January 10	"The Time of My Life"	David Cook	
January 17	"The Time of My Life"	David Cook	
January 24	"The Time of My Life"	David Cook	
January 31	"The Time of My Life"	David Cook	
February 7	"Viva la Vida"	Coldplay	
February 14	"I'm Yours" †	Jason Mraz	
February 21	"I'm Yours" †	Jason Mraz	
February 28	"I'm Yours" †	Jason Mraz	
March 7	"I'm Yours" †	Jason Mraz	
March 14	"I'm Yours" †	Jason Mraz	
March 21	"I'm Yours" †	Jason Mraz	
March 28	"I'm Yours" †	Jason Mraz	
April 4	"I'm Yours" †	Jason Mraz	
April 11	"I'm Yours" †	Jason Mraz	
April 18	"I'm Yours" †	Jason Mraz	
April 25	"I'm Yours" †	Jason Mraz	
May 2	"I'm Yours" †	Jason Mraz	
May 9	"I'm Yours" †	Jason Mraz	
May 16	"I'm Yours" †	Jason Mraz	
May 23	"I'm Yours" †	Jason Mraz	
May 30	"I'm Yours" †	Jason Mraz	
June 6	"Love Story"	Taylor Swift	
June 13	"Love Story"	Taylor Swift	
June 20	"Love Story"	Taylor Swift	
June 27	"Love Story"	Taylor Swift	
July 4	"Love Story"	Taylor Swift	
July 11	"Love Story"	Taylor Swift	
July 18	"The Climb"	Miley Cyrus	
July 25	"The Climb"	Miley Cyrus	
August 1	"The Climb"	Miley Cyrus	
August 8	"The Climb"	Miley Cyrus	
August 15	"The Climb"	Miley Cyrus	
August 22	"The Climb"	Miley Cyrus	
August 29	"The Climb"	Miley Cyrus	
September 5	"The Climb"	Miley Cyrus	
September 12	"The Climb"	Miley Cyrus	
September 19	"The Climb"	Miley Cyrus	
September 26	"The Climb"	Miley Cyrus	
October 3	"The Climb"	Miley Cyrus	
October 10	"The Climb"	Miley Cyrus	
October 17	"The Climb"	Miley Cyrus	
October 24	"The Climb"	Miley Cyrus	
October 31	"You Belong with Me"	Taylor Swift	
November 7	"You Belong with Me"	Taylor Swift	
November 14	"You Belong with Me"	Taylor Swift	
November 21	"You Belong with Me"	Taylor Swift	
November 28	"You Belong with Me"	Taylor Swift	
December 5	"You Belong with Me"	Taylor Swift	
December 12	"You Belong with Me"	Taylor Swift	
December 19	"You Belong with Me"	Taylor Swift	
December 26	"You Belong with Me"	Taylor Swift	

== See also ==
- 2009 in music
