= Teardrops (album) =

Studio album by Tom Dice
- Released: 30 April 2010
- Genre: Pop
- Label: Sonic Angel
- Producer: Tom Dice; Erhan Kurkun; Jeroen Swinnen

Tom Dice chronology
Teardrops (2010)	Heart for Sale (2012)

Singles from Teardrops
- 1. "Bleeding Love" Released: 25 May 2009; 2. "Me and My Guitar" Released: 12 March 2010; 3. "Lucy" Released: 13 August 2010; 4. "A Thousand Years" Released: 20 September 2010

Teardrops is the debut studio album by Belgian singer-songwriter, Tom Dice. It was released on 30 April 2010. The album reached number 1 in Belgium. The album was produced by Tom Dice, Erhan Kurkun and Jeroen Swinnen.

== Singles ==
"Bleeding Love" was the first single to be released from the album, the single peaked to number 7 in Belgium. "Me And My Guitar" was the second single released from the album. Tom Dice sang the song at the Eurovision Song Contest 2010 for Belgium in the final Tom scored 143 points and finished 6th, it also reached number 1 in Belgium. "Lucy" is the third single released from the album and has so far peaked at number 21 in Belgium. "A Thousand Years" is the fourth single released from the album and has so far peaked at number 44 in Belgium.

== Track listing ==
No.	Title	Writer(s)	Producer(s)	Length
1.	"Start Without the Ending"	Tom Dice	Tom Dice; Erhan Kurkun	1:01
2.	"Me and My Guitar"	Dice; Jeroen Swinnen; Ashley Hicklin	Jeroen Swinnen	3:01
3.	"Lucy"	Dice; Tom Helsen	Dice; Tom Helsen	2:59
4.	"Too Late"	Dice	Dice; Kurkun	3:13
5.	"A Soldier for His Country"	Dice	Dice; Kurkun	4:08
6.	"Carrying Our Burden"	Dice	Dice; Kurkun	3:17
7.	"Murderer"	Dice	Dice; Kurkun	3:22
8.	"Why?"	Dice	Dice; Kurkun	3:11
9.	"Forbidden Love"	Dice	Dice; Kurkun	3:47
10.	"Always and Forever"	Dice	Dice; Kurkun	3:30
11.	"Broken"	Dice	Dice; Kurkun	3:55
12.	"Miss Perfect"	Dice	Dice; Kurkun	4:38
13.	"Bleeding Love"	Jesse McCartney; Ryan Tedder	Dice; Kurkun	3:23

Bonus Tracks
No.	Title	Writer(s)	Producer(s)	Length
14.	"A Thousand Years"	Dice	Dice; Kurkun	4:02
15.	"Bleeding Love" (Acoustic)	McCartney; Tedder	Dice; Kurkun	3:30
16.	"Questions & Scars"	Dice	Dice; Kurkun	3:24

== Charts and certifications ==
=== Weekly charts ===
Chart (2010)	Peak position
Belgian Albums (Ultratop Flanders)	1
Belgian Albums (Ultratop Wallonia)	57
French Albums (SNEP)	107

=== Year-end charts ===
Chart (2010)	Position
Belgian Albums (Ultratop Flanders)	33

=== Certifications ===
Country	Certification (sales thresholds)
Belgium	Gold
