= Careful Confessions =

Studio album by Sara Bareilles
- Released: January 20, 2004; 2008 (reissue)
- Recorded: 2003
- Studios: Asylum Recording Studios (Culver City, CA)
- Length: 49:28
- Labels: Tiny Bear Publishing; Epic Records (2008 reissue)
- Producers: Gabriel Mann; Sara Bareilles

Sara Bareilles chronology
Careful Confessions (2004)	Little Voice (2007)

Careful Confessions is the 2004 independently produced debut studio album by Sara Bareilles. In addition to seven studio tracks, the album features four songs recorded during live performances. Several of the songs on the album were re-recorded to appear on Bareilles' second album, Little Voice, her major label debut.

The album was recorded and mixed at Asylum Recording Studios in Culver City, California, over roughly a one-month period in 2003. Bareilles produced alongside college friend Gabriel Mann, prolific singer/songwriter, music producer, television and video game music composer, and member of Los Angeles alternative rock band The Rescues. Mann had produced two albums for Awaken, the college a cappella group Bareilles sang in while attending UCLA.

In 2004, a music video for "Fairytale" was released.

After Bareilles was signed to Epic Records in 2005 and the success of her second and major-label debut Little Voice in 2007, Careful Confessions was reissued in early 2008.

== Track listing ==
All songs written and composed by Sara Bareilles; track 3 additional composition by Javier Dunn

No.	Title	Length
1.	"Gravity"	3:59
2.	"Undertow"	4:42
3.	"Love On the Rocks"	4:18
4.	"Responsible"	4:34
5.	"One Sweet Love"	3:57
6.	"Fairytale"	2:50
7.	"Come Round Soon"	4:51
8.	"Inside Out" (Live)	5:19
9.	"City" (Live)	4:36
10.	"Red" (Live)	4:19
11.	"My Love" (Live)	6:03
Total length:		49:28

== Personnel ==
- Sara Bareilles – piano, vocals
- Josh Day – drums, percussion (tracks 1–7, 11)
- Travis Carlton – bass (tracks 1–8, 11)
- Javier Dunn – guitar
- Mona Tavakoli – drums, background vocals (tracks 8–10)
- Chaska Potter – background vocals (tracks 8–10)
- Josh Archibec – bass (tracks 9, 10)
