= Me and My Guitar (Tom Dice song) =

2010 song by Tom Dice

Single by Tom Dice

from the album Teardrops
- Released: February 2010
- Recorded: 2010
- Genre: Acoustic; Pop
- Label: SonicAngel
- Songwriters: Tom Eeckhout; Jeroen Swinnen; Ashley Hicklin
- Producer: Jeroen Swinnen

Tom Dice singles chronology
"Bleeding Love" (2009)	"Me and My Guitar" (2010)	"Lucy" (2010)

Eurovision Song Contest 2010 entry
- Country: Belgium
- Artist: Tom Dice
- Language: English
- Composers: Tom Eeckhout; Jeroen Swinnen; Ashley Hicklin
- Lyricists: Tom Eeckhout; Jeroen Swinnen; Ashley Hicklin

Finals performance
- Semi-final result: 1st
- Semi-final points: 167
- Final result: 6th
- Final points: 143

Entry chronology
- ◄ "Copycat" (2009)
- "With Love Baby" (2011) ►

"Me and My Guitar" is a song performed by Belgian singer-songwriter Tom Dice from his debut album Teardrops. The song was written by British singer-songwriter Ashley Hicklin, writer-producer Jeroen Swinnen and Tom Dice himself. It took first place in the Eurovision Song Contest 2010 Semi-final 1 on 25 May and was the first Belgian act to qualify for the final since the introduction of the semi-finals in Eurovision. In the final Tom Dice scored 143 points and finished 6th.

== Track listing ==
Digital download
No.	Title	Lyrics	Producer(s)	Length
1.	"Me and My Guitar"	Jeroen Swinnen; Tom Dice; Ashley Hicklin	Jeroen Swinnen	3:00
2.	"Forbidden Love"	Tom Dice	Tom Dice; Erhan Kurkun	3:46

== Credits and personnel ==
- Lead vocals – Tom Dice
- Record producer – Jeroen Swinnen
- Music – Jeroen Swinnen, Tom Dice, Ashley Hicklin
- Lyrics – Jeroen Swinnen, Tom Dice, Ashley Hicklin
- Label: SonicAngel

== Charts performance ==
Chart (2010)	Peak position
Belgium (Ultratop 50 Flanders)	1
Belgium (Ultratop 50 Wallonia)	1
Denmark (Tracklisten)	39
Europe (European Hot 100)	27
France (SNEP)	68
Germany (GfK)	20
Iceland (RÚV)	12
Ireland (IRMA)	20
Netherlands (Single Top 100)	30
Sweden (Sverigetopplistan)	24
Switzerland (Schweizer Hitparade)	32
UK Singles (OCC)	85

=== Certifications ===
Country	Certification (sales thresholds)
Belgium	Gold

== See also ==
- Ultratop 40 number-one hits of 2010
- Ultratop 50 number-one hits of 2010
