= List of Ultratop 40 number-one singles of 2010 =

These singles topped the Belgian Walloon (francophone) Ultratop 40 in 2010.

Issue date	Song	Artist
2 January	"Meet Me Halfway"	The Black Eyed Peas
9 January	"Meet Me Halfway"	The Black Eyed Peas
16 January	"Tik Tok"	Kesha
23 January	"Tik Tok"	Kesha
30 January	"Tik Tok"	Kesha
6 February	"Tik Tok"	Kesha
13 February	"Tik Tok"	Kesha
20 February	"Tik Tok"	Kesha
27 February	"We Are the World 25 for Haiti"	Artists for Haiti
6 March	"Memories"	David Guetta featuring Kid Cudi
13 March	"Memories"	David Guetta featuring Kid Cudi
20 March	"Memories"	David Guetta featuring Kid Cudi
27 March	"Memories"	David Guetta featuring Kid Cudi
3 April	"Telephone"	Lady Gaga featuring Beyoncé
10 April	"Telephone"	Lady Gaga featuring Beyoncé
17 April	"Telephone"	Lady Gaga featuring Beyoncé
24 April	"Telephone"	Lady Gaga featuring Beyoncé
1 May	"Telephone"	Lady Gaga featuring Beyoncé
8 May	"Alors on danse"	Stromae
15 May	"Telephone"	Lady Gaga featuring Beyoncé
22 May	"Alors on danse"	Stromae
29 May	"Alors on danse"	Stromae
5 June	"Me and My Guitar"	Tom Dice
12 June	"Me and My Guitar"	Tom Dice
19 June	"Waka Waka (This Time for Africa)"	Shakira featuring Freshlyground
26 June	"Waka Waka (This Time for Africa)"	Shakira featuring Freshlyground
3 July	"Waka Waka (This Time for Africa)"	Shakira featuring Freshlyground
10 July	"Waka Waka (This Time for Africa)"	Shakira featuring Freshlyground
17 July	"Waka Waka (This Time for Africa)"	Shakira featuring Freshlyground
24 July	"Waka Waka (This Time for Africa)"	Shakira featuring Freshlyground
31 July	"Waka Waka (This Time for Africa)"	Shakira featuring Freshlyground
7 August	"We No Speak Americano"	Yolanda Be Cool & DCUP
14 August	"We No Speak Americano"	Yolanda Be Cool & DCUP
21 August	"We No Speak Americano"	Yolanda Be Cool & DCUP
28 August	"Waka Waka (This Time for Africa)"	Shakira featuring Freshlyground
4 September	"We No Speak Americano"	Yolanda Be Cool & DCUP
11 September	"Love the Way You Lie"	Eminem featuring Rihanna
18 September	"Love the Way You Lie"	Eminem featuring Rihanna
25 September	"Love the Way You Lie"	Eminem featuring Rihanna
2 October	"Dynamite"	Taio Cruz
9 October	"Only Girl (In the World)"	Rihanna
16 October	"Only Girl (In the World)"	Rihanna
23 October	"Barbra Streisand"	Duck Sauce
30 October	"Only Girl (In the World)"	Rihanna
6 November	"Loca"	Shakira featuring Dizzee Rascal
13 November	"Loca"	Shakira featuring Dizzee Rascal
20 November	"Barbra Streisand"	Duck Sauce
27 November	"The Time (Dirty Bit)"	The Black Eyed Peas
4 December	"The Time (Dirty Bit)"	The Black Eyed Peas
11 December	"The Time (Dirty Bit)"	The Black Eyed Peas
18 December	"The Time (Dirty Bit)"	The Black Eyed Peas
25 December	"The Time (Dirty Bit)"	The Black Eyed Peas

== See also ==
- 2010 in music
