= Gravity (Sara Bareilles song) =

Single by Sara Bareilles

from the album Little Voice
- Released: February 3, 2009
- Recorded: 2007
- Studio: NRG Recording Studios (Los Angeles, CA)
- Length: 3:52
- Label: Epic
- Songwriter: Sara Bareilles
- Producer: Eric Rosse

Sara Bareilles singles chronology
"Winter Song" (2008)	"Gravity" (2009)	"King of Anything" (2010)

Music video
- "Sara Bareilles - Gravity (Official HD Video)" on YouTube

"Gravity" is a song written and performed by Sara Bareilles. It was released as the third single from her major-label debut album Little Voice (2007). The track was produced by Eric Rosse. Its music video was released on February 3, 2009. Bareilles said she wrote the song after her "first real heartbreak", and was hoping the ballad would help others in similar situations. The song was originally on her UCLA a cappella group's album Dysfunktional Family Album as well as her first album Careful Confessions, but was later included on Little Voice.

== Composition ==
Sheet music for the track is composed in the key of C major in common time with a tempo of "gently" at 80 beats per minute.

== Critical reception ==
"Gravity" received widespread acclaim from music critics. Chris Klimek of The Washington Post called the song "haunting" and stated that "Gravity is strong evidence that Bareilles's songcraft may yet warrant the stardom she's attained." Shirley Brinkley wrote for The Virginian-Pilot that it was her favorite song, and that "It speaks to the paradoxes and complexity of relationships". Michael Menachem of Billboard wrote, "[T]his melodic, introspective ballad is Bareilles' finest moment." The Hollywood Reporter mentioned the song in their review of one her concerts, stating it was the "night's bravest and most powerful performance" when "she brilliantly sang fan favorite Gravity". Mark Savage for BBC News called it a "tearjerking ballad" and characterized it as Bareilles' calling card.

== Music video ==
In an homage to the short film Powers of Ten, the music video for "Gravity" features a single unbroken take of Bareilles strolling in the middle of a street while people are walking behind her bringing lights, balloons, and globes of other planets representing a journey through the Solar System and into deep space. The video was directed by Mathew Cullen of Motion Theory.

== Cover versions ==
Kelly Clarkson covered the song in Durham, North Carolina, during her Stronger World Tour, in which she praised Bareilles's voice and lyrics. Bareilles responding the following day by tweeting: “Holy pipes, Batman! Kelly Clarkson sang Gravity. Whoah. Gurrrl. Can. Sang. So Cool!”

Brittany Cairns performed this song for her blind audition on the first season of The Voice - Australia. Cairns' version peaked at number 58 on the ARIA Singles Chart in April 2012.

Emma Hunton and Josh Pence covered this song in Season 3, Episode 9 of Good Trouble, "Driver's Seat."

== In popular culture ==
The song is frequently used in fan YouTube videos with romantic couples from TV shows or movies.

A shipping video featuring a clip montage of the characters of Jeff Winger (Joel McHale) and Annie Edison (Alison Brie) set to "Gravity" was made by a Community fan in November 2009, halfway through the first season of the show. The video inspired show creator Dan Harmon and he included a similar sequence of clips of the two characters in the second season episode "Paradigms of Human Memory". Harmon paid for the rights to the song himself. The clips of Annie and Jeff were immediately followed by clips of Pierce Hawthorne (Chevy Chase) and Abed Nadir (Danny Pudi) again set to "Gravity", as a parody to show how easy it is make any set of characters appear romantically interested in one another (this was repeated with Annie's Boobs, a monkey, and Ben Chang near the end of the episode). Bareilles eventually made an appearance as a hot-air balloon guide in "Intro to Felt Surrogacy", the ninth episode of the series' fourth season.

It was used as the closing song in the pilot episode of the Starz series Gravity.

On So You Think You Can Dance, Season 5, Mia Michaels choreographed a dance that Kayla and Kupono performed. In the dance, Kupono personified the concept of addiction while Kayla was the addict.

It was used in Season 1, Episode 2 and Season 5, Episode 4 of The Vampire Diaries.

== Charts ==
Chart (2012)	Peak position
South Korea International Singles (Gaon)	44

Chart (2013)	Peak position
New Zealand (Recorded Music NZ)	27

Chart (2017)	Peak position
Scottish Singles Sales (Official Charts)	64

== Certifications ==
Region	Certification	Certified units/sales
New Zealand (RMNZ)	Gold	15,000^{‡}
United Kingdom (BPI)	Silver	200,000^{‡}
United States (RIAA)	2× Platinum	2,000,000^{‡}
^{‡} Sales+streaming figures based on certification alone.
