= A Baby Changes Everything =

Single by Faith Hill

from the album Joy to the World
- Released: September 2008
- Genre: Country, Christmas
- Length: 4:52
- Label: Warner Bros. Nashville
- Songwriters: Craig Wiseman, Tim Nichols
- Producers: Byron Gallimore, Faith Hill, Dann Huff

Faith Hill singles chronology
"Red Umbrella" (2007)	"A Baby Changes Everything" (2008)	"Come Home" (2011)

"A Baby Changes Everything" is a song by American country singer Faith Hill. It was the first single released from her album Joy to the World. It was her thirteenth single release to AC radio, and in late 2008, the song spent three weeks at number one on the Billboard Adult Contemporary chart.

== Content ==
The song is the tale of a pregnant teenage girl faced with the uncertainty of her future and coming to terms with the fact that her life is about to change. In the bridge of the song, it is revealed that the teenaged girl and baby in question are in fact the virgin Mary and Jesus Christ.

== Chart performance ==
"A Baby Changes Everything" debuted at No. 24 on the Billboard Hot Adult Contemporary Tracks for the week of November 29, 2008. After spending only four weeks on the chart, the song became her fourth number-one single on that chart.

The song then debuted at No. 57 on the Billboard Hot Country Songs chart for the week of December 13, 2008. After five weeks on the country chart, the song peaked at No. 36, giving Hill her thirty-fifth Top 40 single on the country chart.

Chart (2008–2009)	Peak position
US Billboard Bubbling Under Hot 100	5
US Hot Country Songs (Billboard)	36
US Adult Contemporary (Billboard)	1

== See also ==
List of Billboard Adult Contemporary number ones of 2008 and 2009 (U.S.)
