= Bleeding Love =

2007 single by Leona Lewis

Single by Leona Lewis

from the album Spirit
- B-side: "Forgiveness"
- Released: 16 September 2007
- Recorded: 2007
- Studio: Mansfield Studios (Los Angeles, California); Record Plant (Hollywood, California); Encore Studios (Burbank, California)
- Genre: Pop; R&B
- Length: 4:22
- Label: Syco Music; J
- Songwriters: Jesse McCartney; Ryan Tedder
- Producer: Ryan Tedder

Leona Lewis singles chronology
"A Moment Like This" (2006)	"Bleeding Love" (2007)	"Better in Time" / "Footprints in the Sand" (2008)

"Bleeding Love" is a song recorded by British singer Leona Lewis for her debut studio album, Spirit (2007). It was originally written and recorded by American singer Jesse McCartney, and was co-written and produced by American singer Ryan Tedder. (Note: McCartney's version was later included as a bonus track on the international editions of his third studio album Departure (2008).) "Bleeding Love" was released worldwide during the last quarter of 2007, and the first of 2008, as the album's lead single internationally, and as the second single in Ireland and the United Kingdom. McCartney later included his version of the song as a bonus track on the international edition of his third studio album, Departure (2008). It is Lewis' biggest hit, to date, and remains her signature song. As of 2021, "Bleeding Love" has been streamed over two billion times.

Debuting at number one on the Irish Singles Chart and UK Singles Chart, "Bleeding Love" became the best-selling single of 2007 in both countries. After its release, the single became a massive success and was the world's best-selling single of 2008. "Bleeding Love" reached number one in over 35 countries, including France, Germany, Japan and the United States, making it only the second single in history to achieve this feat, Elton John's "Candle in the Wind '97" being the first. The original accompanying music video first aired on 17 October 2007, and was uploaded to YouTube that same day. A second music video was premiered on 29 January 2008, on Yahoo! Music and was uploaded to YouTube the next day.

"Bleeding Love" has sold more than one million copies in the United Kingdom and over 4 million digital downloads in the United States, where it was the best-selling digital song there in 2008. It was named the 17th most successful song of the 2000s in the United States. "Bleeding Love" has charted on the UK Singles Chart in three different years: at number one in 2007; number 76 in 2008; and at number 97 in 2009. It sold 788,000 copies in the United Kingdom alone during 2007. "Bleeding Love" was nominated for Record of the Year and Best Female Pop Vocal Performance at the 51st Annual Grammy Awards. It also received a nomination for Best British Single at the 2008 Brit Awards.

== Background ==
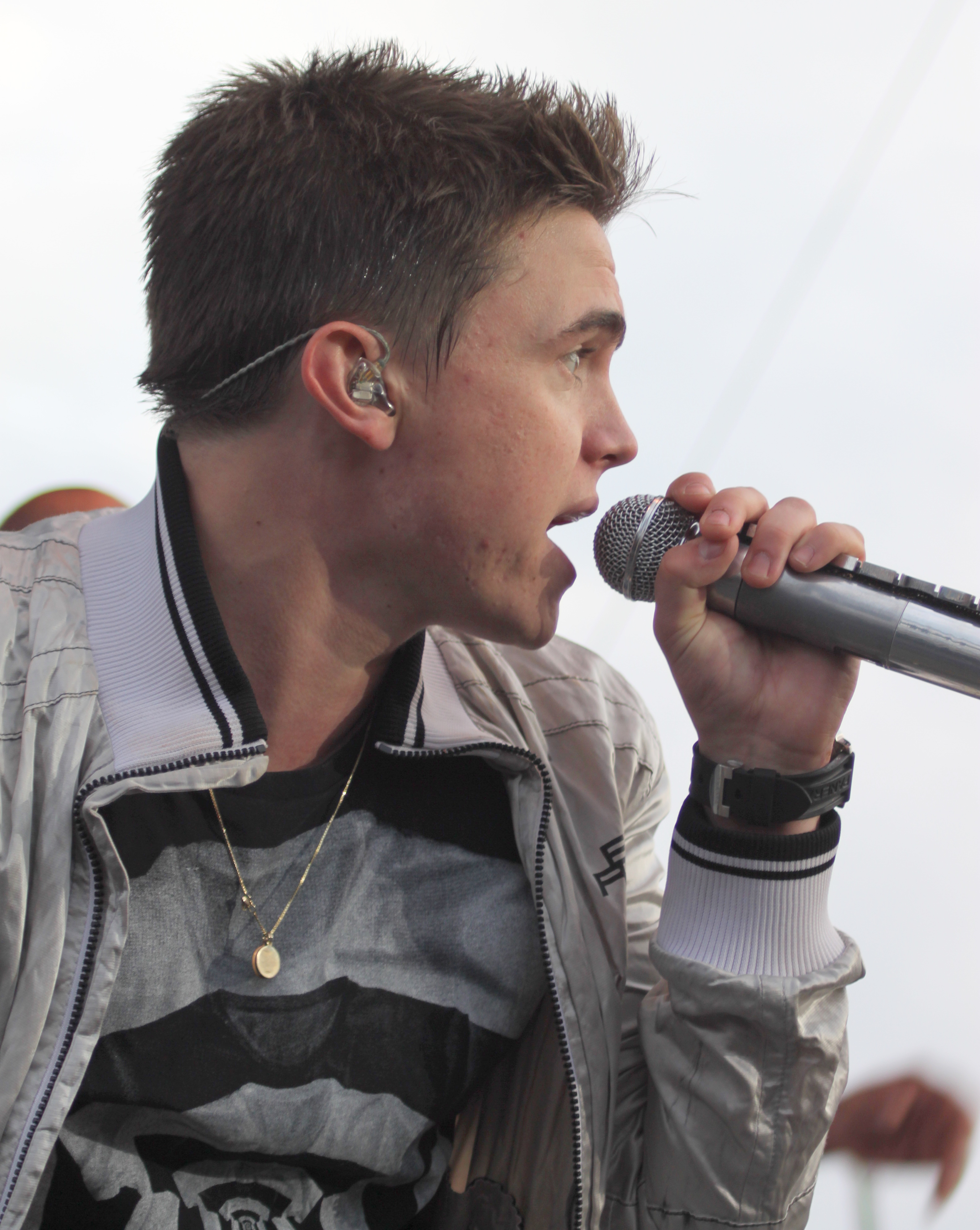
"Bleeding Love" was initially co-written by Jesse McCartney (pictured) for his third album Departure.

In 2006, Leona Lewis entered the third series of the British reality television music competition The X Factor and, after performing and competing against other aspiring hopefuls, the public voted her the winner on 16 December 2006, receiving 60% of the final vote. As the winner, Lewis received the prize of a £1 million recording contract with Sony BMG, of which The X Factor's creator Simon Cowell is an A&R executive, and with Cowell's own label Syco Music.

Meanwhile, in February 2007, OneRepublic's frontman Ryan Tedder and singer Jesse McCartney had written "Bleeding Love" for the latter's third studio album, Departure (2008). However, his label, Hollywood Records, did not like the song. Tedder believed it was a "massive" song and the record company was "out of [their] mind". Despite his own reality television background, Tedder had previously made the decision not to work with contestants from American Idol, but he had not heard of The X Factor, and on being shown a website about Lewis, he thought that "her voice just sounded unreal," saying that "from a writer's perspective, this girl – with or without a television show – has one of the best voices I've ever heard." On hearing that Cowell was looking for songs for Lewis' debut studio album, Tedder rearranged "Bleeding Love", changed the key and tailored it to suit her voice. He pitched the song to Cowell, who said it was "the one". After the success of Lewis' version, the song was re-recorded by McCartney, being included as a bonus track on the international edition of Departure.

== Recording and production ==
"Bleeding Love" was written by McCartney and Tedder, while production was helmed by the latter. It was recorded at several studios in California, including Mansfield Studios in Los Angeles, the Record Plant in Hollywood and Encore Studios in Burbank. The song was recorded at these locations by Tedder and Craig Durrance, and were assisted in the process by Nate Hertweck. Programming and arrangement was carried out also by Tedder. It was mixed by Phil Tan at Soapbox Studios in Atlanta, Georgia, and he was assisted by Josh Houghkirk. The song's string arrangement was completed by Tedder.

== Composition and lyrics ==
"Bleeding Love"
A 26-second sample of "Bleeding Love" containing the chorus, backed by drums and a church organ.

"Bleeding Love" is a mid-tempo pop and R&B song set in the key of F major. It moves at 104 beats per minute and is set in 4/4 time signature. The album version runs for four minutes and twenty-two seconds and the radio edit runs for three minutes and fifty-nine seconds. Lewis' vocal range extends from C_{4} to B♭_{5}, but has gone higher into the sixth octave in most live performances of the song. "Bleeding Love" is constructed in the common verse–chorus–bridge song pattern. The song employs a church organ which is audible throughout until the bridge. Synthesized strings are also prominent throughout the song, which intermittently integrates wood block percussion. A heavy, distorted marching band-like drum loop backs the song. It employs a harmonic shift beginning at the bridge. A harmonic shift or harmonic variety generally identifies most song bridges. In "Bleeding Love", the turn around from the common I, vi, IV, V (F, Dm, Bb, C) progression used exclusively up to the bridge for both verses and choruses shifts to focus on the relative minor: vi, IV, I/V, V (Dm, Bb, F/C, C).

McCartney wrote the song about his longtime girlfriend and said: "I kept thinking about being in love so much that it hurts. I was away from my girlfriend for four months at the time and I really wanted to [quit] and fly home. I was so in love that it was painful. It was like bleeding, it cut me open." Lyrically, "Bleeding Love" shows the singer in a relationship and extremely blinded by love. Heedless of warnings from friends, and regardless of being emotionally hurt by the person the song is addressed to, the singer continues to love that person and accepts the pain. Metaphorically, this is represented by being "cut open". When this happens, however, all the singer can do is "bleed love" for the person being addressed.

== Promotion ==
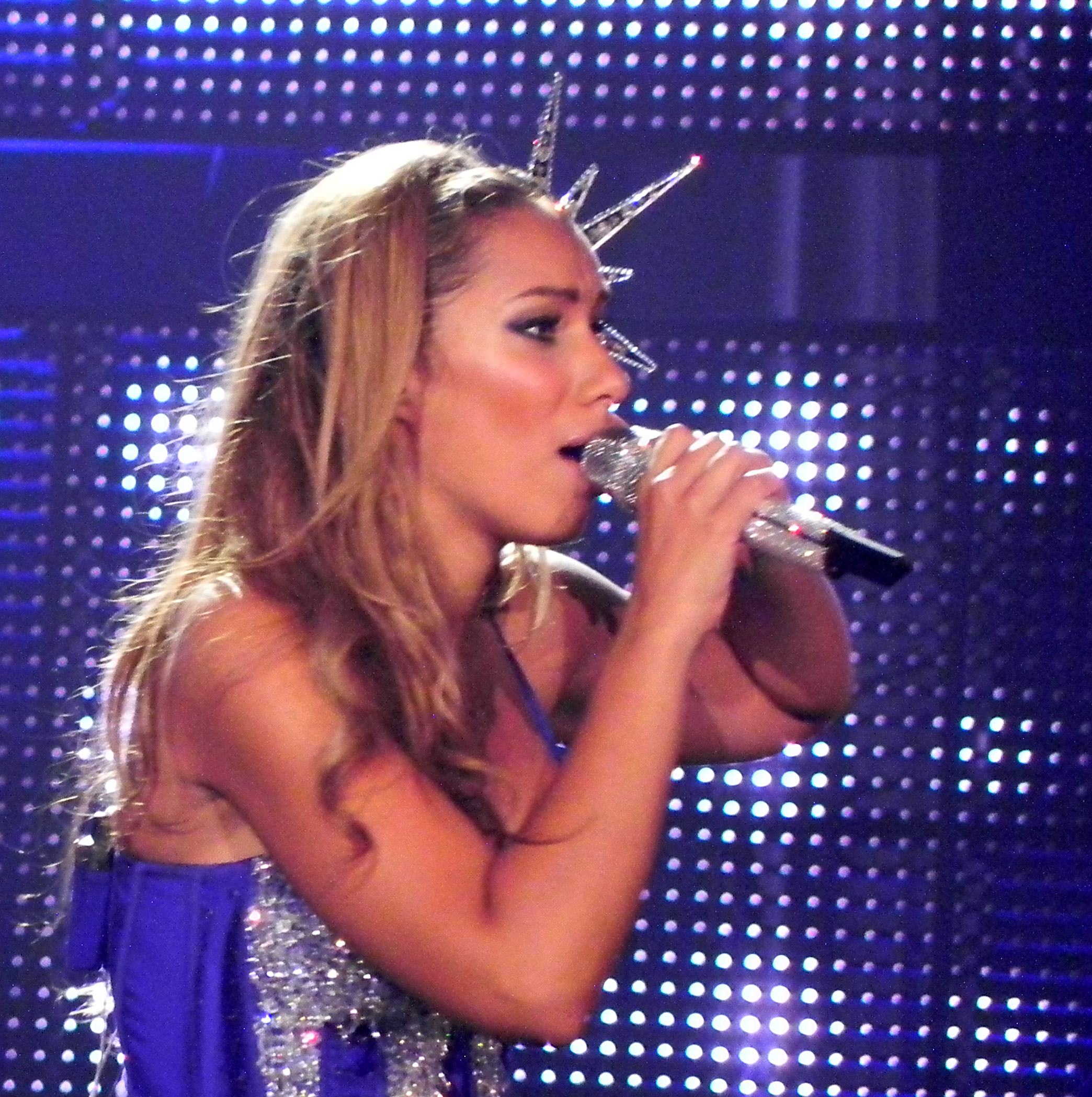
Lewis performing "Bleeding Love" on her debut concert tour The Labyrinth (2010).

The song's first radio play was on the BBC Radio 1 Chart Show on 16 September 2007, and was quickly followed by an online exclusive streaming by celebrity blogger Perez Hilton. It was reported that over 1.5 million people listened to the song online. "Bleeding Love" was also Scott Mills' Record of the Week from Monday 24 September to Friday 28 September. Lewis went on a two-day regional radio tour in the United Kingdom to promote the single and album on 11 and 12 October 2007. This was followed by an appearance on This Morning on 15 October. Lewis performed the song live on the fourth series of The X Factor on 20 October 2007, and also made appearances on several other television and radio shows such as T4, GMTV and Loose Women.

Lewis performed the song at the Sanremo Music Festival in Italy on 29 February 2008, and on the German entertainment television show Wetten, dass..? on 1 March 2008. The singer made her US television debut on The Oprah Show on 17 March 2008, where she sang "Bleeding Love". She also performed it on Good Morning America on 4 April 2008, Live with Regis and Kelly on 8 April 2008, Jimmy Kimmel Live!, The Ellen Show on 11 April 2008, and The Tyra Banks Show on 17 April 2008. Lewis performed the song live on the seventh season of American Idol on Wednesday 23 April 2008.

== Critical reception ==
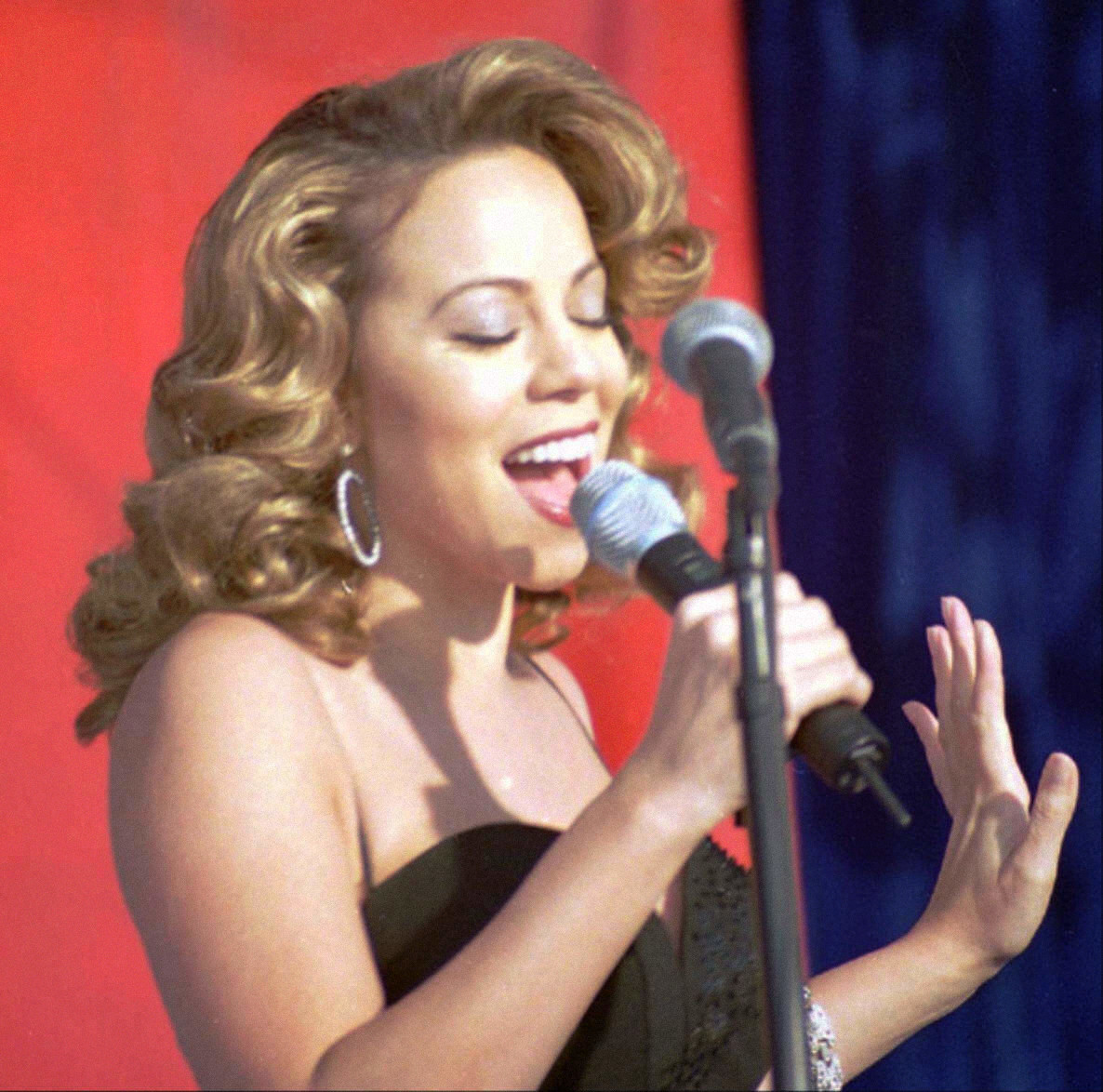
Critics noted similarities between Lewis' vocals and those of American singer Mariah Carey.

"Bleeding Love" received widespread acclaim from music critics. Showbiz Spy described it as "emotionally fuelled," and opined "this track perfectly showcases Leona's impressive vocal prowess and from the moment she opens her mouth we are instantly reminded about her amazing voice, capable of heart stopping intensity and a playful light touch." Digital Spy's review of the song gave it four out of five stars, saying it is "easily the best single to be released by an X Factor star," and describing it as "a brilliantly smart pop record, managing to offer the lovelorn balladry that Lewis' X Factor fans are no doubt craving, while also suggesting a hint of street cred in the form of some beefy, vaguely modish beats." It came second in Digital Spy's Top 20 Singles of 2007 announced on 31 December.

However, BBC America's reviewer expressed that "the inventive percussion can't stop 'Bleeding Love' from sounding dated, like filler on some long-lost, late '90s Mariah Carey album. It is one of those mid-tempo numbers – too slow for the club, too fast for the foxtrot. Actually, with its marching band drum beat, it sounds as much like Gwen Stefani's 'Hollaback Girl' as a ballad can." The critic continues to say, "On to the positive: Lewis wisely restrains her vocals, never devolving into those vocal acrobatics that have historically plagued Christina Aguilera." Billboard's review by Singles Review editor Chuck Taylor for "Bleeding Love", the first ahead of the song's release in the United States, stated it was "a colossal and timeless debut," going on to say "not only a one-listen harmonic show-stopper, it is also hip, soulful, beat-rippling and an undeniable vocal tour de force." The Village Voice described the song as a "perfectly devised emo-pop machine ... the old Mariah is jealous right now".

=== Accolades ===
"Bleeding Love" has earned Lewis numerous awards and nominations. In December 2007, it won the Record of the Year and the award for Best Track at the 2007 Virgin Media Music Awards. In January 2008, the song was nominated for Best British Single at the 2008 Brit Awards. Although the award was won by Take That's "Shine", it was announced that "Bleeding Love" had received the second-highest number of public votes. The song's massive success earned Lewis the award at Britain's Best 2008, which was aired on ITV1 on Friday 23 May 2008. On 3 December 2008, "Bleeding Love" was nominated for Record of the Year and Best Female Pop Vocal Performance at the 51st Annual Grammy Awards, but lost to Robert Plant and Alison Krauss' "Please Read the Letter" and Adele's "Chasing Pavements", respectively. Rolling Stone ranked it 25th on their list of the 100 Best Singles of 2008. In April 2009, Tedder and McCartney were awarded with the Song of the Year Award at the 26th Annual ASCAP Pop Music Awards. In September 2011, VH1 ranked "Bleeding Love" number 67 on its list for the 100 Greatest Songs of the '00s.

The song has been ranked 129th by Billboard on its 600 most massive smashes over the chart's six decades.

== Chart performance ==
In the United Kingdom, "Bleeding Love" debuted at the top of the UK Singles Chart on 28 October 2007 ― for the week ending dated 3 November 2007. With the single reaching number one, Lewis became the first X Factor contestant to achieve two chart-topping hits. It was reported to be outselling Take That's "Rule the World" by three-to-one in chain store Woolworths. The single went on to sell 218,805 copies in its first week, gaining the biggest one-week sales in 2007, a feat it maintained until "When You Believe" by Leon Jackson ― her successor as winner of the UK X Factor – was released in December 2007. In its second and third weeks on sale, the single sold 158,370 copies and 111,978 copies, respectively, bringing the total sales to 489,153 and making "Bleeding Love" the biggest-selling single of 2007 after just three weeks of release. It stayed at the top of the chart for seven weeks, the longest run from a homegrown female solo artist in British chart history, until Adele's "Easy on Me" spent eight weeks at number one in 2021 and 2022. By the end of 2007, "Bleeding Love" had sold a total of 788,000 copies, becoming Britain's biggest-selling single of 2007. It was the first time a single by a British female solo artist had topped the end of year singles sales chart in the then 55-year history of the Official Charts Company. The British Phonographic Industry (BPI) certified the single platinum on 18 January 2008, and three-times platinum on 5 March 2021. In February 2014, it was confirmed by the Official Charts Company that "Bleeding Love" had sold total of 1,180,000 copies in the United Kingdom, making it the 103rd song overall to sell a million copies in Britain, with Lewis the fourteenth female singer to achieve the feat.

In Australia, "Bleeding Love" debuted at number nine on the ARIA Singles Chart on the issue dated 24 December 2007, and topped the chart on 21 January 2008. On 10 February 2008, the single received a platinum certification by the Australian Recording Industry Association (ARIA), with sales of over 70,000 copies. In New Zealand, Lewis became the first British female artist to have a number-one single since the Sugababes' "Push the Button" topped the chart in January 2006; it stayed at number one for five weeks. It also reached number one in Belgium, France, the Netherlands, Norway and Switzerland. In Spain, the single reached number two on the Promusicae Singles Chart and was certified platinum for sales of 40,000 copies. "Bleeding Love" was a success on radio stations around the world, reaching number one on the Airplay Charts of the United Kingdom, Switzerland, Germany, Australia, New Zealand, Luxembourg, Slovakia, Latin America, Estonia and Japan. In the Greek Airplay Chart, it reached number two. In Italy, the single peaked at number two on the FIMI Singles Chart based only on digital downloads; instead it peaked at number one on the Italian Musica&Dischi Singles Chart, which is based on digital downloads and CD single sales, for 13 non-consecutive weeks.

In the United States, "Bleeding Love" was released digitally on 18 December 2007, and debuted on the Bubbling Under Hot 100 chart at number 11. The single officially debuted at number 85 on the Billboard Hot 100 on the issue dated 1 March 2008. It became Lewis' first US top-ten hit and reached the top of the Hot 100 three separate times: twice for one week and once for two weeks. It also topped the Billboard component charts, including the Hot Digital Songs and Adult Contemporary, where it spent 52 weeks. Lewis is the third British female artist to have a number-one hit with a debut US single, following Petula Clark with "Downtown" and Sheena Easton with "Morning Train (Nine to Five)". It became the second single to have three separate turns atop the Hot 100, following Chic's "Le Freak". On Billboard's Hot 100 Year-End chart for 2008, "Bleeding Love" was ranked at number two, only behind "Low" by Flo Rida featuring T-Pain. During this time, Spirit debuted at number one on the Billboard 200, making Lewis the first British solo artist in 18 years to simultaneously top both the Billboard 200 and Hot 100 charts. Certified platinum by the Recording Industry Association of America (RIAA), the single has sold 4,589,000 digital downloads in the United States as of December 2013. In January 2025, "Bleeding Love" was ranked by Billboard as the 60th highest-performing song of the 21st century so-far on the Billboard Hot 100, based on weekly chart performance. In Canada, "Bleeding Love" peaked at number one on the Canadian Hot 100 on the issue dated 5 April 2008.

In July 2025, "Bleeding Love" surpassed 1 billion streams on Spotify, becoming Lewis' first song to achieve this milestone on the service.

== Music videos ==
Two music videos were produced for the release of "Bleeding Love". The first was directed by Melina Matsoukas and was filmed in Los Angeles. It is set in a mock apartment block and features six storylines about couples in different stages of relationships. Lewis stated that it is "real colourful, very funky, has lots of extras and I get to really perform". Matsoukas explained her meaning of the music video in an interview on MTV's Making the Video, saying that the water in the video is a metaphor for the tenants' love problems, as if the apartments are bleeding love. The version of the music video was first uploaded to YouTube on 17 October 2007, and which now has over 204 million views.

Lewis filmed a second music video in New York City for the US release of "Bleeding Love". The treatment for the video was written by Tedder, and centres on a storyline involving Lewis arguing with her boyfriend, played by model Nicholas Lemons. It was directed by Jessy Terrero. The music video premiered on 29 January 2008, on Yahoo! Music, and was uploaded to YouTube on the next day. Its television debut was on 4 February 2008, on VH1 as part of their "You Oughta Know" campaign. This video has over 362 million views on YouTube.

The first version of the music video was nominated for Best UK Video at the 2008 MTV Video Music Awards. The second version was number one on the VH1's Year-End Top 40.

== Track listing and formats ==
- CD single (88697175622)
1. "Bleeding Love" (Album Version) – 4:22
2. "Forgiveness"(Kara DioGuardi, Leona Lewis, Salaam Remi) – 4:21
- Maxi single (88697222422)
1. "Bleeding Love" (Album Version) – 4:22
2. "Forgiveness" – 4:21
3. "A Moment Like This" (Jörgen Elofsson, John Reid) – 4:17
4. "Bleeding Love" (video)
- US digital single (886972980522)
1. "Bleeding Love" (Album Version) – 4:22

== Credits and personnel ==
Credits adapted from the liner notes of Spirit.

Recording

- Recorded at Mansfield Studios, Los Angeles, California; Record Plant, Hollywood, California; Encore Studios, Burbank, California.
- Mixed at Soapbox Studios, Atlanta, Georgia.

Personnel

- Songwriting – Ryan Tedder, Jesse McCartney
- Production – Ryan Tedder
- Programming and arrangement – Ryan Tedder
- Vocal recording – Ryan Tedder, Craig Durrance
- Assistant vocal recording – Nate Hertweck
- Mixing – Phil Tan
- Assistant mixing – Josh Houghkirk
- String arrangement – Ryan Tedder

== Charts ==
=== Weekly charts ===
Chart (2007–2008)	Peak position
Australia (ARIA)	1
Austria (Ö3 Austria Top 40)	1
Belgium (Ultratop 50 Flanders)	1
Belgium (Ultratop 50 Wallonia)	4
Canada Hot 100 (Billboard)	1
Canada AC (Billboard)	1
Canada CHR/Top 40 (Billboard)	2
Canada Hot AC (Billboard)	1
CIS Airplay (TopHit)	3
Croatia International Airplay (HRT)	1
Czech Republic Airplay (ČNS IFPI)	2
Denmark (Tracklisten)	2
European Hot 100 Singles (Billboard)	1
Finland (Suomen virallinen lista)	2
France (SNEP)	1
Germany (GfK)	1
Hungary (Rádiós Top 40)	1
Ireland (IRMA)	1
Italy (FIMI)	2
Japan Hot 100 (Billboard)	1
Mexico (Top 20 – Inglés)	2
Netherlands (Dutch Top 40)	1
Netherlands (Single Top 100)	1
New Zealand (Recorded Music NZ)	1
Norway (VG-lista)	1
Poland (Polish Airplay Chart)	1
Portugal Digital Songs (Billboard)	3
Romania (Romanian Top 100)	4
Russia Airplay (TopHit)	9
Russia Airplay (TopHit) Moto Blanco Radio Remix	37
Scottish Singles Sales (Official Charts)	1
Slovakia Airplay (ČNS IFPI)	1
Spain (Promusicae)	38
Spain Airplay (PROMUSICAE)	9
Sweden (Sverigetopplistan)	2
Switzerland (Schweizer Hitparade)	1
Turkey (Turkey Top 20)	2
UK Singles (Official Charts)	1
UK Airplay (Music Week)	1
UK Hip Hop/R&B (Official Charts)	1
US Billboard Hot 100	1
US Adult Pop Airplay (Billboard)	1
US Adult Contemporary (Billboard)	1
US Dance Club Songs (Billboard)	11
US Hot R&B/Hip-Hop Songs (Billboard)	74
US Pop Airplay (Billboard)	1
US Rhythmic Airplay (Billboard)	6

Chart (2025–2026)	Peak position
Estonia Airplay (TopHit)	90
Philippines (Billboard Philippines Hot 100)	87

=== Year-end charts ===
Chart (2007)	Position
European Hot 100 Singles (Billboard)	81
Ireland (IRMA)	1
Sweden (Sverigetopplistan)	81
UK Singles (OCC)	1

Chart (2008)	Position
Australia (ARIA)	4
Austria (Ö3 Austria Top 40)	3
Belgium (Ultratop 50 Flanders)	2
Belgium (Ultratop 50 Wallonia)	22
Brazil (Crowley)	84
Canada (Canadian Hot 100)	2
Canada AC (Billboard)	7
Canada CHR/Top 40 (Billboard)	9
Canada Hot AC (Billboard)	1
CIS (TopHit)	23
European Hot 100 Singles (Billboard)	3
France (SNEP)	42
Germany (Media Control GfK)	2
Italy (FIMI)	13
Japan (Japan Hot 100)	8
Netherlands (Dutch Top 40)	7
Netherlands (Single Top 100)	12
New Zealand (RIANZ)	8
Portugal (AFP)	14
Russia Airplay (TopHit)	61
Russia Airplay (TopHit) Moto Blanco radio remix	183
Spain (PROMUSICAE)	40
Sweden (Sverigetopplistan)	23
Switzerland (Schweizer Hitparade)	2
Taiwan (Yearly Singles Top 100)	4
UK Singles (OCC)	76
US Billboard Hot 100	2
US Adult Contemporary (Billboard)	4
US Adult Top 40 (Billboard)	6
US Mainstream Top 40 (Billboard)	3
US Rhythmic Airplay (Billboard)	30

Chart (2009)	Position
US Adult Contemporary (Billboard)	15

Chart (2025)	Position
Estonia Airplay (TopHit)	175

=== Decade-end charts ===
Chart (2000–2009)	Rank position
Australia (ARIA)	23
Germany (Official German Charts)	18
UK Singles (OCC)	11
US Billboard Hot 100	17

=== All-time charts ===
Chart	Rank position
Australia (ARIA)	39
New Zealand (Recorded Music NZ)	54
UK Singles (OCC)	121
US Billboard Hot 100	129

== Certifications and sales ==
Region	Certification	Certified units/sales
Australia (ARIA)	2× Platinum	140,000^{^}
Austria (IFPI Austria)	Gold	15,000^{*}
Belgium (BRMA)	Gold	10,000^{*}
Canada (Music Canada)	Platinum	129,000
Denmark (IFPI Danmark)	2× Platinum	30,000^{^}
Finland (Musiikkituottajat)	Platinum	20,000
Germany (BVMI)	5× Gold	750,000^{‡}
Italy (FIMI)	Gold	146,673 (Note: In Italy, "Bleeding Love" sold 121,673 copies in 2008 alone. Federazione Industria Musicale Italiana (FIMI) began including digital downloads to determine certifications on 1 January 2010. In 2019, "Bleeding Love" was certified gold for 2010–2019 digital sales of 25,000 units.)
New Zealand (RMNZ)	5× Platinum	150,000^{‡}
Spain (Promusicae)	Platinum	25,000^{*}
Sweden (GLF)	2× Platinum	40,000^{^}
United Kingdom (BPI)	4× Platinum	2,400,000^{‡}
United States (RIAA)	Platinum	4,589,000
Ringtone
Canada (Music Canada) Mastertone	Gold	20,000^{*}
Japan (RIAJ) Ringtone	Gold	100,000^{*}
United States (RIAA) Mastertone	Platinum	1,000,000^{*}
^{*} Sales figures based on certification alone.^{^} Shipments figures based on certification alone.^{‡} Sales+streaming figures based on certification alone.

== Release history ==
Region	Date	Format(s)	Label(s)	Ref.
Various	16 September 2007	Streaming	Syco Music	
United Kingdom	19 October 2007	Digital download	Syco Music	
United Kingdom	22 October 2007	CD	Syco Music	
Australia	13 December 2007	CD	Sony BMG	
United Kingdom	28 December 2007	Digital download (EP)	Syco Music	
Germany	11 January 2008	CD; CD maxi	Ariola	
Belgium	14 January 2008	CD maxi	RCA	
France	14 January 2008	CD maxi	RCA	
Hong Kong	23 January 2008	CD maxi	Sony BMG	
Netherlands	28 January 2008	CD	Sony BMG	
Belgium	11 February 2008	CD	RCA	
France	17 March 2008	CD	RCA	
United States	4 February 2008	Contemporary hit radio; rhythmic contemporary	J	
United States	18 March 2008	CD	J	
United States	1 April 2008	Digital download (EP)	J	

== Tom Dice version ==
"Bleeding Love"

Single by Tom Dice

from the album Teardrops
- Released: 25 May 2010
- Genre: Pop
- Length: 3:23
- Label: Sonic Angel
- Songwriters: Jesse McCartney; Ryan Tedder
- Producers: Tom Dice; Erhan Kurkun

Tom Dice singles chronology
"Bleeding Love" (2010)	"Me and My Guitar" (2010)

"Bleeding Love" was covered by Belgian singer-songwriter Tom Dice after he won the Flemish version of The X Factor in 2008. He released his version on 25 May 2010, and included it on his debut studio album, Teardrops (2010). It reached number seven on the Ultratop 50 Flanders chart.

=== Track listing ===
Digital download
No.	Title	Length
1.	"Bleeding Love"	3:23
2.	"A Soldier for His Country"	4:12

=== Charts ===
==== Weekly charts ====
Chart (2009)	Peak position
Belgium (Ultratop 50 Flanders)	7

== See also ==
- List of best-selling singles
- List of best-selling singles by year in the United Kingdom
- List of UK Singles Chart number ones of the 2000s
- List of number-one singles of 2007 (Ireland)
- List of 2000s number-one singles (New Zealand)
- List of number-one singles of 2008 (Australia)
- List of European number-one hits of 2008
- List of number-one hits of 2008 (France)
- List of Ultratop 50 number-one singles of 2008
- List of Dutch Top 40 number-one singles of 2008
- List of Hot 100 number-one singles of 2008 (Canada)
- List of Hot 100 number-one singles of 2008 (Japan)
- List of Hot 100 number-one singles of 2008 (U.S.)
- List of number-one adult contemporary singles of 2008 (U.S.)
