= Pure Imagination (disambiguation) =

"Pure Imagination" is a song from the 1971 film Willy Wonka & the Chocolate Factory.

Pure Imagination may also refer to:

== Music ==
- Pure Imagination (Eric Reed album), 1998
- Pure Imagination (Michael Feinstein album), 1992
- Pure Imagination, a 2004–2007 series of compilation albums from Utopia Records
- "Come with Me (Pure Imagination)", a 2016 song by Karmin
- “Pure Imagination”, a 1999 remixed version of the Brenda K. Starr song "I Still Believe"

== Other uses ==
- Pure Imagination (comics), an American comic book, magazine, and book publisher
- "Pure Imagination" (Top Chef Just Desserts), a 2011 TV episode
- Pure Imagination, an ice cave in the Sandy Glacier Caves, Mt. Hood, Oregon

== See also ==
- The Land of Pure Imagination, a 2006 album by Roger Joseph Manning, Jr.
- Imagination (disambiguation)
- Imaginary (disambiguation)
- Imagine (disambiguation)
