= Hornet Disaster =

2025 studio album by Weatherday

Studio album by Weatherday
- Released: 19 March 2025
- Recorded: 2020–2025
- Genres: Emo; lo-fi; noise pop; slacker rock
- Length: 76:22
- Label: Topshelf Records
- Producer: Weatherday

Weatherday chronology
Come In (2019)	Hornet Disaster (2025)

Singles from Hornet Disaster
- 1. "Angel" / "Heartbeats" Released: 29 January 2025; 2. "Tiara" Released: 19 February 2025; 3. "Ripped Apart By Hands" Released: 5 March 2025

Hornet Disaster is the second studio album by Weatherday, a solo project of the Swedish musician Sputnik, released on 19 March 2025, through Topshelf Records. An emo, lo-fi, noise pop, and slacker rock album, they entirely wrote, produced, and performed the whole album. It follows Weatherday's 2019 album Come In, which received a cult following online.

== Background and recording ==
Weatherday released their debut studio album, Come In, in 2019. It received a cult following online after its release on websites such as Rate Your Music, Bandcamp, and Album of the Year. In 2022, they also released the collaborate EP Weatherglow with Asian Glow.

After the success of Come In, Weatherday upgraded their production software from GarageBand to Logic Pro and their microphone from an iPhone earbud to an actual microphone. However, they still said it was a "cheap, tiny one". Weatherday said that writing and recording tracks did not take very long and that the most time-consuming process was the production, which took up much of the fifteen hours daily they worked on making music. They started working on the album in 2020, with the initial plan to make a more casual EP with less effort for experience, with it eventually morphing into an album and gaining complexity. They ended up making nearly seventy songs for the album. Some fans called the album Sprite in its early days because of a joke Weatherday made online.

== Production and composition ==
=== Overview ===
The album is primarily an emo, lo-fi, noise pop, and slacker rock album. Hornet Disaster has a darker and more aggressive tone than Come In; Weatherday said that "Come In is the happy album, and [Hornet Disaster] is the sad one", being more explosive, harsh, and abrasive. They also said that it places more emphasis on hooks and pop song structures to be more "conventional"-sounding. Their main influences on the album included Snowing, The Brave Little Abacus, and Number Girl. Many of the songs deal with the feeling of being misunderstood.

=== Songs ===
Andrew Sacher of BrooklynVegan compared Weatherday's "yelpy" singing on "Angel" to the singing of Bren Lukens from Modern Baseball. "Pulka", a song about the Swedish winter, is sung entirely in Swedish and is Weatherday's version of Swedish rock from bands such as Broder Daniel and Kent. "Heartbeats" combines bedroom pop with noise pop and its title references "Heartbeats", the 2002 single by Swedish electronic music duo The Knife. On "Chopland Sedans", Weatherday ventures into a bit of hyperpop mixed with The Beach Boys harmonies. "Ripped Apart By Hands" has the narrator overwhelmed and in turmoil as the instrumental seems about to break apart. "Tiara" is a noise pop song reminiscent of work of The Brave Little Abacus where the narrator tries to make connections after being isolated. The closing track, "Heaven Smile", ventures into trip hop.

== Release and promotion ==
Weatherday announced Hornet Disaster on 30 October 2024; they also announced a U.S. tour for spring 2025. On 29 January, they released two songs, "Angel" and "Heartbeats", as singles for the album. The second single, "Tiara", was released on 19 February. "Ripped Apart By Hands", the third and final single, was released on 5 March.

== Critical reception ==
Professional ratings
Review scores
Source	Rating
Boolin Tunes	7/10
The Daily Campus	4.5/5
The Needle Drop	7/10
North Texas Daily	3.5/5

The album received positive reviews. Stereogum called Hornet Disaster Generation Z's The Glow Pt. 2 or Twin Fantasy. Both Tim Averell of Boolin Tunes and Anthony Fantano gave the album a 7/10, noting the highlights and energy but felt that the album was a bit bloated and long considering its energy. Bonnibel Lilith Rampertab of The Daily Campus rated the album 4.5/5, praising the sonic and thematic elements of the album. Diego Hernandez of North Texas Daily, in a 3.5/5 review, thought that the album frequently lost itself in its chaos, although there were outstanding moments.

== Track listing ==
All songs are written and produced by Weatherday.

Hornet Disaster track listing
No.	Title	Length
1.	"Hornet Disaster"	1:53
2.	"Meanie"	2:38
3.	"Angel"	1:54
4.	"Take Care of Yourself (Paper-Like Nests)"	3:46
5.	"Hug"	4:51
6.	"Radar Ballet"	4:50
7.	"Green Tea Seaweed Sea"	6:20
8.	"Blood Online"	3:24
9.	"Blanket"	4:00
10.	"Pulka"	3:30
11.	"Heartbeats"	2:30
12.	"Chopland Sedans"	4:27
13.	"Cooperative Calligraphy"	4:04
14.	"Ripped Apart By Hands"	3:46
15.	"Nostalgia Drive Avatar"	8:17
16.	"Aldehydes"	3:33
17.	"Tiara"	3:42
18.	"Agatha's Goldfish (Sparkling Water)"	6:02
19.	"Heaven Smile"	2:44
Total length:		76:22
