= Come In (Weatherday album) =

Studio album by Weatherday
- Released: 29 April 2019
- Genre: Emo; lo-fi; noise pop; indie rock
- Length: 51:17
- Label: Porcelain Music (Note: Topshelf Records later sold physical copies of the album.)
- Producer: Weatherday

Weatherday chronology
Come In (2019)	Hornet Disaster (2025)

Come In (stylized as Come in) is the debut album by Weatherday, a solo project of the Swedish musician Sputnik, released on 29 April 2019. The album was entirely written, performed, and recorded by Sputnik, who used minimal equipment and varied recording locations. It has been described as emo, lo-fi, noise pop, and indie rock. Following its release, Come In gained a cult following online on sites such as Rate Your Music, Album of The Year, and Bandcamp. Critics praised the album's wide breadth of sound and emotional lyrics and performance.

== Background and recording ==
Weatherday is the solo project of the semi-anonymous Swedish musician Sputnik. Prior to releasing Come In, Sputnik created webcomics with the characters Agatha, Oswald, Ines, and Mio, who all make appearances in the album; Mio also appears on the cover art. They (Note: Sputnik uses singular they pronouns.) were also active in music communities hosted on Discord and Reddit.

According to the liner notes on Bandcamp, Sputnik variously recorded the album in their bedroom, a rehearsal space, a cabin in the mountains, a bog, and a city. The music was recorded on GarageBand on an iPhone, using a hands-free microphone attached to a pair of headphones. Late into the mixing process, Sputnik switched to a desktop application of GarageBand, on which they made major EQ and panning adjustments. They had no previous producing or mixing experience.

== Composition ==
Come In has been described as emo, lo-fi, noise pop, and indie rock and as having influence from shoegaze, bedroom pop, post-punk, and post-hardcore. Many reviews noted the wide scope of the album's sound and influences. Classical music was an important influence for Sputnik; their first instrument was the cello and they stated that they "wanted to base the sound on classical music (classical and romantic eras) and emo with some pop." Although the album's sound has been widely compared to Car Seat Headrest's, Sputnik stated the band's work was not a conscious influence on their own. They have listed their influences as including The Brave Little Abacus, Shinsei Kamattechan, and My Chemical Romance, along with visual media such as Ghost in the Shell and Mother.

Sputnik wrote the lyrics for Come In before the instrumentals in order to form a base for a concept album, a process that took a year. The story was inspired by a webcomic they wrote several years prior and is told from multiple perspectives. Sputnik said that the album's themes are in the title and the audience's interpretation, specifically saying that "everything ties into letting someone or something into your personal space or consciousness". Marvin Dotiyal wrote that the album's lyrical leitmotif is "letting someone into your life and ultimately out seeing the verisimilitude of love." Highlighting the album as one to watch, Zoe Camp described its lyrical approach as being "no thoughts unspoken, no emotions suppressed, no base instinct ignored". Camp also described it as a "queer confessional" and Dotiyal called it "a picture-perfect portrait of Sputnik as much as it is a puzzle of their characteristic nuances as a nonbinary artist." Sputnik said that while there is no wrong way to listen the album, they want people to be aware of the "significant LGBTQ themes throughout."

== Release and response ==
Come In was released on Porcelain Music in April 2019. The album gained attention on Bandcamp and later on online music communities such as the r/indieheads subreddit and Rate Your Music, where it gained a cult following. The album particularly made waves in the emo community; Leor Gelil described it as "an urtext for emo's emerging fifth wave" and Matt Cruz wrote that Sputnik's following and acclaim made them a "figurehead" in the "cultural and technical zeitgeist of emo". Parannoul said that Come In was the main influence on his album To See the Next Part of the Dream.

In 2021, Topshelf Records reissued the album on vinyl, CD, and cassette. After the initial vinyl press sold out, copies went for sale on Discogs for as high as US$100. In February 2022, a compilation album consisting of songs by musicians who participate in the Weatherday fan Discord server was released.

== Critical reception ==
Professional ratings
Review scores
Source	Rating
The Needle Drop	7/10

Critical reception for the album was positive. While critical of the recording quality and its influences being obvious at points, Anthony Fantano said that the album was "easily one of the more creative rock records [he'd] heard" that year and praised the album's high energy and emotional heart. Marvin Dotiyal of ACRN Media found the lo-fi quality to be crucial to the album's atmosphere and wrote that "the ambiance buzzes like a fridge waiting to be opened". He also praised its intimacy, stating that it "embraces you dearly with emotional strife but also warmth" and is an "unfiltered, stripped-down reflection of Sputnik themself." Luke Whitaker of The Pacific Index referred to the album as Sputnik's magnum opus and called it a "modern relative classic", saying that it had the potential to reach a similar level of internet success to Twin Fantasy, In the Aeroplane Over the Sea, and The Glow Pt. 2.

== Track listing ==
All tracks are written, produced, and performed by Weatherday.

Come In track listing
No.	Title	Length
1.	"Come In"	1:36
2.	"Older Than Before (Oswald Made No Way for Himself)"	3:42
3.	"Mio, Min Mio"	4:46
4.	"Sleep in While You're Doing Your Best"	2:21
5.	"My Sputnik Sweetheart"	13:43
6.	"Cut Lips"	3:26
7.	"Embarrassing Paintings (Agatha Showed Great Initiative in Art Class This Week)"	3:21
8.	"Water Dreamer the Same"	6:11
9.	"Painted Girl's Theme"	3:17
10.	"Агaтка (Agatha! You're Being Melodramatic)"	4:26
11.	"Porcelain Hands"	4:28
Total length:		51:17

Notes

- All track titles are stylized in sentence case.
