= Paraglow =

2022 extended play by Parannoul and Asian Glow

EP by Parannoul and Asian Glow
- Released: 21 September 2022
- Genre: Shoegaze, emo
- Length: 28:46
- Label: Longinus Recordings
- Producer: Parannoul, Asian Glow

Parannoul chronology
White Ceiling / Black Dots Wandering Around (2022)	Paraglow (2022)	After the Magic (2023)

Asian Glow chronology
Stalled Flutes, Means (2022)	Paraglow (2022)	Dreamglow (2023)

Paraglow is an extended play (EP) by the South Korean musicians Parannoul and Asian Glow. It was released on 21 September 2022.

== Background ==
Parannoul and Asian Glow are two representative artists of the shoegaze scene that started in South Korea since 2020. They had previously collaborated on Downfall of the Neon Youth, and prior to the EP's release, they also joined the crew Digital Dawn, which includes Brokenteeth, Wapddi, Della Zyr and Fin Fior.

== Critical reception ==
Professional ratings
Review scores
Source	Rating
Pitchfork	7.4/10

Ian Cohen of Pitchfork wrote: "Paraglow, a new joint release from the Seoul artists feels like a true collaboration, fusing their distinct styles with shoegaze production and alt-rock guitars." Paraglow was named the best EP of 2022 by Our Culture Mag. Writing for it, Konstantinos Pappis described the track "Wheel" as "the 15-minute mammoth of a closing track, that overflows with the most astounding ideas, leaving you dizzy and breathless".

== Track listing ==
No.	Title	Length
1.	"Hand" ("손")	5:32
2.	"The Light Side of the Eyes" ("흰자")	4:19
3.	"Swamp" ("늪")	4:00
4.	"Wheel" ("운전대")	14:55
