= Sketchbook (disambiguation) =

A sketchbook is a book or pad with blank pages for sketching. It may also refer to:

- Sketchbook (manga), a Japanese manga series written and illustrated by Totan Kobako
- Sketchbook (software), a raster graphics software app intended for expressive drawing and concept sketching
- Sketchbook, an original 2022 documentary series made for the Disney+ service

== Music ==
- Sketchbook (album), a 2019 album by American singer Fantasia
- Sketchbook, a 1990 album by American jazz bassist and composer John Patitucci
- Sketchbook, a 2002 album by American singer, songwriter and bassist Johnette Napolitano
- Sketchbook, a 2017 EP by South Korean boy band 100%
- "Sketchbook", a song by Parannoul from After the Magic, 2023
