= Imagination (disambiguation) =

Imagination is the process of producing mental images.

Imagination or Imaginations may also refer to:

== Books ==
- Imaginations, William Carlos Williams 1970
- Imagination (magazine), a science fiction and fantasy magazine

== Film and TV ==
- Imagination (film), a 2007 fantasy film
- "Imagination" (The Armando Iannucci Shows), a television episode

== Companies and leisure ==
- Imagination! (Epcot pavilion), a pavilion at Epcot, a Disney theme park
- Imagination Technologies, a British company
- Carnival Imagination, a cruise ship
- Mercedes-Benz F200 "Imagination", a concept automobile
- ImagiNation Network, a 1990s online gaming network

== Organizations ==
- Imagination Foundation, a non-profit organization

== Music ==
- Imagination (band), a British soul band
- The Imaginations, California band The Charades
- The Imaginations (band), Mari Wilson
- The Imaginations Brass, Music of the Virgin Islands

=== Albums ===
- Imagination (Bethany Dillon album), 2005
- Billy Eckstine's Imagination, 1958
- Imagination (Brian Wilson album), 1998
- Imagination (Curtis Fuller album), 1959
- Imagination (Deni Hines album), 1996
- Imagination (Dick Haymes album), 1982
- Imagination (Gladys Knight & the Pips album), 1973
- Imagination (Helen Reddy album), 1983, or the title song
- Imagination, a 1958 album by The King Sisters, also a track on the album
- Imagination (La Toya Jackson album), 1986, or the title song (see below)
- Imagination (Lisette Melendez album), 1998, or the title song
- Imagination (The Whispers album), 1980, or the title song
- Imagination (Woody Shaw album), 1988
- Imaginations (Fantastic Plastic Machine album), 2006
- Imaginations (Molly Nilsson album), 2017

=== Songs ===
- "Imagination" (1940 song), a popular song written by Johnny Burke and Jimmy Van Heusen
- "Imagination" (Belouis Some song)
- "Imagination" (Cee Farrow song)
- "Imagination" (Deni Hines song)
- "Imagination" (Gorgon City song)
- "Imagination" (JES song)
- "Imagination" (La Toya Jackson song)
- "Imagination" (Tamia song)
- "Imagination", by Erasure from The Innocents
- "Imagination", by Jessica Simpson from Irresistible
- "Imagination", by Laura Branigan and featured on the soundtrack to Flashdance in 1983
- "Imagination", by Milk Inc.
- "Imagination", by Parannoul from After the Magic
- "Imagination", by Pseudo Echo from Race
- "Imagination", by Xymox
- "Imagination", a 1928 song written by Joseph Meyer and Roger Wolfe Kahn
- "Imagination", a song from the television series Small Potatoes

== See also ==
- Imaginary (disambiguation)
- Imagine (disambiguation)
