= Imagine =

Imagine may refer to:

- Imagination

== Music ==
=== Albums ===
- Imagine (Armin van Buuren album), 2008
- Imagine (Eva Cassidy album), 2002
- Imagine (Janice Vidal album), 2012
- Imagine (John Lennon album), 1971
  - Imagine: John Lennon (soundtrack), 1988
- Imagine (Mort Shuman album), 1976
- Imagine, a 1997 album by 14 Karat Soul
- Imagine, a 2000 album by Aaron Benward
- Imagine, a 1993 album by Gonzalo Rubalcaba
- Imagine, a 1995 album by Keiko Lee
- Imagine, a 2004 album by Minmi
- Imagine, a 1996 album by Ofra Harnoy
- Imagine, a 1989 album by Sébastien El Chato
- Imagine, a 2008 album by Vox Angeli

=== Songs ===
- "Imagine" (song), a 1971 song by John Lennon
- "Imagine" (Ariana Grande song), 2018
- "Imagine" (Shola Ama song), 1999
- "Imagine" (Snoop Dogg song), 2006
- "Imagine" (Tone Damli song), 2012
- "Imagine", a song by Armin van Buuren from Imagine, 2008
- "Imagine", a song by Doja Cat from Planet Her, 2021
- "Imagine", a song by Salt-n-Pepa from Brand New, 1997
- "Imagine", a 1969 song by Argosy
- "Imagine", a song by Daniël Sahuleka
- "Imagine", a song by Sébastien El Chato
- "Imagine", a song from the film Athena
- "Imagine", a song from the film The Bobo
- "Imagine", a song by Christ Crosby from the film Flipper's New Adventure
- "I Can Only Imagine" (MercyMe song) or "Imagine", 1999

== Film and television ==
- Imagine (1972 film), a film by John Lennon and Yoko Ono
- Imagine (1986 film), a short film by Zbigniew Rybczyński
- Imagine (2012 film), a Polish film
- Imagine (TV series), a BBC arts show
- Imagine Entertainment, a production company founded by Brian Grazer and Ron Howard
- Imagine Film Festival, a film festival in Amsterdam, Netherlands
- Imagine: John Lennon, a 1988 documentary film
- Imagine TV, a former Indian TV channel
- “Imagine”, the final episode of Kamen Rider ZEZTZ

== Games ==
- Imagine (video game series), a series of Nintendo DS and Wii games
- Shin Megami Tensei: Imagine, a MMORPG
- Imagine Software, a UK video game company

== Books and magazines ==
- Imagine (book), a book by Alan McCombes and Tommy Sheridan
- Imagine: How Creativity Works, a 2012 book by Jonah Lehrer
- Imagine (game magazine), an adventure games magazine
- Imagine (educational magazine), an educational periodical for 7th-12th graders
- Imagine Publishing, a UK-based magazine publisher
- Imagine, a 1970s comics magazine published by Star Reach
- Imagine, a journal by the Socialist Party of Canada

== Other uses ==
- Imagine (horse), an Irish Thoroughbred racehorse
- Imagine (3D modeling software), a 3D modeling and ray tracing program
- Imagine Communications, an Irish ISP and telephone operator
- Imagine Communications Corporation, a television technology company
- imagine (Brunei telecommunications company), a Bruneian ISP and telephone operator
- Imagine (Gal Gadot video), a 2020 video by Gal Gadot and other celebrities

== See also ==
- Ikarus Imagine, a German hang glider design
- Imagen (disambiguation)
- Imaginary (disambiguation)
- Imagine... A Fantasy in the Sky, a fireworks show at the Disneyland Resort in California, U.S.
- Imago (disambiguation)
- Imajin, American contemporary R&B band
  - Imajin (album), eponymous album from the band
