= Sky Hundred =

Studio album by Parannoul
- Released: 3 August 2024
- Genre: Shoegaze, noise pop
- Length: 52:22
- Label: Poclanos
- Producer: Parannoul

Parannoul chronology
Scattersun (2024)	Sky Hundred (2024)

Singles from Sky Hundred
- 1. "Gold River" Released: 9 May 2024; 2. "Painless" Released: 12 July 2024

Professional ratings
Review scores
Source	Rating
The Line of Best Fit	8/10
Ondarock	6.5/10
Pitchfork	7.9/10

Sky Hundred is the fourth solo studio album by South Korean shoegaze musician Parannoul. It was surprise-released to Bandcamp on 3 August 2024, and later to all streaming platforms on 7 August. The album was preceded by two singles: "Gold River" on 9 May and "Painless" on 12 July.

In the album's Bandcamp description:

"The sky is looking at hundreds of me, and no one can answer what the difference is between us. […] Innumerable skies have shone brighter than me, and now I think they are too precious for me to accept the truth and disappearance directly." (Note: Original Korean: 하늘은 수백의 저를 보고 있고, 그들과 제가 과연 무엇이 다른지 아무도 제 앞에서 대답하지 못했습니다. [...] 수많은 하늘은 저보다 빛났고, 진실과 사라짐을 직접 받아들이기엔 그동안 너무 소중하게 자라왔던 것 같습니다.)

— Parannoul

He dedicated the album to his current listeners, to his family, to "those who have left", and to "hundreds of me". Paste named it one of the best albums of 2024, and PopMatters named it one of the best shoegaze albums of 2024.

== Track listing ==
Sky Hundred track listing
No.	Title	Length
1.	"주마등 (A Lot Can Happen)"	4:36
2.	"황금빛 강 (Gold River)"	5:11
3.	"Maybe Somewhere"	5:16
4.	"고통없이 (Painless)"	5:14
5.	"암전고백 (Lights Off Repentance)"	3:39
6.	"Evoke Me"	14:05
7.	"No One Talks About It Anymore"	1:28
8.	"시계 (Backwards)"	6:00
9.	"후회하는 의미 (Meaning of Regret) (Note: Track 9 is listed as "Meaning of Forget" on some digital versions.)"	1:12
10.	"환상 (Fantasy)"	5:41
Total length:		52:22

The album featured different abridged track listing for its vinyl release and remastered recording

Vinyl Version (Side One)
No.	Title	Length
1.	"주마등 (A Lot Can Happen)"	4:36
2.	"황금빛 강 (Gold River)"	5:11
3.	"Maybe Somewhere"	5:16
4.	"고통없이 (Painless)"	5:14
5.	"암전고백 (Lights Off Repentance)"	3:39

Vinyl Version (Side Two)
No.	Title	Length
1.	"Evoke Me (LP Version)"
2.	"시계 (Backwards) (LP Version)"
3.	"환상 (Fantasy) (LP Version)"
