= I Wanna Love You (Akon song) =

2006 single by Akon

Single by Akon featuring Snoop Dogg

from the album Konvicted and Tha Blue Carpet Treatment
- B-side: "Struggle Everyday"
- Released: October 5, 2006
- Genre: R&B; hip-hop
- Length: 4:07; 2:59 (short version)
- Label: SRC; Universal; Konvict; UpFront; Geffen; Doggystyle
- Songwriters: Aliaune Thiam; Cordozar Broadus
- Producer: Akon

Akon singles chronology
"Smack That" (2006)	"I Wanna Love You" (2006)	"The Sweet Escape" (2006)

Snoop Dogg singles chronology
"Vato" (2006)	"I Wanna Love You" (2006)	"That's That" (2006)

Music video
- "I Wanna Love You" on YouTube

"I Wanna Love You" (originally titled "I Wanna Fuck You") is a song by Senegalese-American singer Akon featuring American rapper Snoop Dogg. It was released in October 2006 as the second single from his second studio album, Konvicted. It is also featured on Snoop Dogg's eighth album, Tha Blue Carpet Treatment. This song was Akon's first #1 single on the Billboard Hot 100 and was also Snoop's second #1 on the same chart. It also reached a peak of #3 on the UK Singles Chart. The track originally had Akon as a featured artist and was performed by rapper Plies from Fort Myers, Florida, but his verse was replaced by Snoop's and his name has been left out from the writers' credits. This song was #88 on MTV Asia's list of Top 100 Hits of 2007. The song was nominated for the Grammy Award for Best Rap/Sung Collaboration at the 50th Grammy Awards in 2008.

In the edited version of the song, the word "fuck" is replaced with "love", and a line in the chorus ("I see you winding and grinding, up on that pole") is rewritten as "up on the floor". "Pussy", "penis" "nigga" are played backwards, and "dick", "fucking", and "titties" are blanked out. However, despite the self-censorship, a Parental Advisory label was still printed on the cover. The Vevo version of the music video is highly censored, with words like "caddy" and "riding," due to their context within the song, muted as well.

== Background ==
Florida rapper Plies was the original performer on this song, but Akon replaced his verses with those of Snoop Dogg's for commercial reasons. Plies was arrested on July 2, 2006, for illegal gun possession while two of his people were charged with attempted murder after a shooting broke out at 238 West Nightclub in Gainesville, Florida. Plies was performing a concert when he was informed that his show would be cut 15 minutes short in order to give time to Lil' Boosie to perform right after. In response, Plies' entourage started to fire at the crowd, resulting in the injury of five people with non-life-threatening wounds. Shortly after, Plies was released after paying $50,000 bail. Akon wished to continue to promote his song, but remained worried that the recent incident involving Plies would reflect poorly on his label. Since the version with Snoop Dogg already circulated unofficially in the mixtape scene, Akon replaced the single and album edit since Snoop Dogg was already a well-received name, as opposed to that of an up-and-coming, controversial artist. Akon and Snoop Dogg's management also agreed to participate on each other's forthcoming albums. In an interview with Akon on Hot 97, he said that the song was sent for Trick Daddy but somehow ended up in the hands of Plies. It was said that Plies was not the originator of the song and should have never recorded to that beat in the first place. To make up for this, Akon recorded and produced the single "Hypnotized" for Plies, being featured on it also. This reached #14 on the U.S. Billboard Hot 100 chart. Samples of the Roland TR-808 drum machine provide the song's bass drum, clap and hi-hat sounds. The song was covered in 2007 by CocoRosie. Their version of the song is written from the perspective of the pole dancer, who is described as a victim of childhood sexual abuse and her own drug addiction (and implicitly, of all the men who are only interested in her as a sexual object).

== Music video ==
The video was directed by Benny Boom and premiered on BET's 106 & Park on November 17, 2006. It was performed live at the 2006 American Music Awards.

== Track listing ==
I Wanna Love You — United States vinyl single
No.	Title	Writer(s)	Producer(s)	Length
1.	"I Wanna Love You" ((featuring Snoop Dogg) (Clean))	Aliaune "Akon" Thiam	Akon	4:07
2.	"I Wanna Love You" ((featuring Snoop Dogg) (Dirty))	Akon	Akon	4:07
3.	"I Wanna Love You" ((featuring Snoop Dogg) (Instrumental)	Akon	Akon	4:07
Total length:				12:21

I Wanna Love You — United Kingdom CD single
No.	Title	Writer(s)	Producer(s)	Length
1.	"I Wanna Love You" (featuring Snoop Dogg)	Aliaune "Akon" Thiam	Akon	4:11
2.	"Struggle Everyday"	Akon	Akon	4:16
Total length:				8:27

I Wanna Love You — Australia CD single
No.	Title	Writer(s)	Producer(s)	Length
1.	"I Wanna Love You" (featuring Snoop Dogg and Sean Paul) (Clean))	Aliaune "Akon" Thiam	Akon	4:07
2.	"I Wanna Love You" (featuring Snoop Dogg) (Explicit))	Akon	Akon	4:07
3.	"Struggle Everyday"	Akon	Akon	4:17
4.	"I Wanna Love You" (Video)	Akon	Akon	4:07
Total length:				16:38

== Official versions ==
Several remixes of the song exist. The official remix features Tego Calderón and Snoop Dogg and is included in the album as an iTunes album-only bonus track. The first, titled the 'Six Minute Remix', features additional vocals and production by Plies. The second, titled the 'Seven Minute Remix', features both Plies and rapper Trina. The third version, titled the 'International Remix', features Portuguese rapper Boss AC. A video also exists for this version. The fourth remix, the 'Australian Remix', features both Snoop Dogg and Sean Paul performing vocals. The fifth remix, the 'Walmart Remix', features Tego Calderón, Don Omar and Cynthia Antigua, and appears as a bonus track on the Walmart version of Konvicted. A further remix, the 'Female Mix', features new vocals by Nivea and Rasheeda.

== Personnel ==
- Written by C. Broadus, A. Thiam
- Produced by Aliaune "Akon" Thiam for Upfront/Konvict
- Publishers: My Own Chit Publishing/EMI Blackwood Music (BMI); Byefall Music/Famous Music Publishing (ASCAP)
- Recorded by Akon and Mark "Exit" Goodchild at Konkast Recording Studios, Atlanta, Georgia, Patchwerks Studio, Atlanta, Ga, Record Plant Studios, Los Angeles, California
- Snoop's vocals recorded by Chris Jackson at The Cathedral
- Assisted by Rick DeVarona
- Mixed by Leslie Brathwaite at PatchwerksStudio, Atlanta, Georgia
- Assisted by Kori Andrews

== Charts ==
=== Weekly charts ===
Chart (2006–2007)	Peak position
Australia (ARIA)	6
Australian Urban (ARIA)	2
Austria (Ö3 Austria Top 40)	29
Belgium (Ultratop 50 Flanders)	16
Belgium (Ultratop 50 Wallonia)	13
Canada Hot 100 (Billboard)	23
Canada CHR/Top 40 (Billboard)	4
CIS Airplay (TopHit)	34
Czech Republic Airplay (ČNS IFPI)	7
Denmark (Tracklisten)	2
Germany (GfK)	14
Hungary (Dance Top 40)	28
Hungary (Editors' Choice Top 40)	28
Ireland (IRMA)	2
Netherlands (Dutch Top 40)	21
Netherlands (Single Top 100)	20
New Zealand (Recorded Music NZ)	2
Norway (VG-lista)	16
Russia Airplay (TopHit)	43
Scottish Singles Sales (Official Charts)	2
Slovakia Airplay (ČNS IFPI)	40
Sweden (Sverigetopplistan)	17
Switzerland (Schweizer Hitparade)	16
UK Singles (Official Charts)	3
UK Hip Hop/R&B (Official Charts)	1
US Billboard Hot 100	1
US Pop Airplay (Billboard)	3
US Hot Latin Songs (Billboard)	16
US Hot R&B/Hip-Hop Songs (Billboard)	3
US Rhythmic Airplay (Billboard)	1

=== Year-end charts ===
Chart (2007)	Position
Australia (ARIA)	43
Belgium (Ultratop Flanders)	94
Belgium (Ultratop Wallonia)	62
Brazil (Crowley)	15
CIS (TopHit)	114
Germany (Official German Charts)	86
New Zealand (Recorded Music NZ)	27
Russia Airplay (TopHit)	107
Switzerland (Schweizer Hitparade)	77
UK Singles (Official Charts Company)	36
UK Urban (Music Week)	9
US Billboard Hot 100	8
US Hot Latin Songs (Billboard)	46
US Hot R&B/Hip-Hop Songs (Billboard)	20
US Rhythmic (Billboard)	15

== Certifications ==
Region	Certification	Certified units/sales
Australia (ARIA)	3× Platinum	210,000^{‡}
Brazil (Pro-Música Brasil) DMS	Platinum	60,000^{*}
Brazil (Pro-Música Brasil)	Diamond	250,000^{‡}
Denmark (IFPI Danmark)	Gold	4,000^{^}
Germany (BVMI)	Gold	150,000^{‡}
New Zealand (RMNZ)	3× Platinum	90,000^{‡}
United Kingdom (BPI)	Platinum	600,000^{‡}
United States (RIAA)	6× Platinum	6,000,000^{‡}
United States (RIAA) Mastertone	3× Platinum	3,000,000^{*}
^{*} Sales figures based on certification alone.^{^} Shipments figures based on certification alone.^{‡} Sales+streaming figures based on certification alone.

== See also ==
- List of Billboard Hot 100 number-one singles of 2006
- List of Billboard Rhythmic number-one songs of the 2000s
