= The Imaginary =

The Imaginary may refer to:

- The Imaginary (novel) (2014), written by A. F. Harold and illustrated by Emily Gravett
  - The Imaginary (film) (2023), directed by Yoshiyuki Momose and produced by Studio Ponoc
- The Imaginary (Sartre) (1940), by Jean-Paul Sartre
- "The Imaginary" (short story) (1942), by Isaac Asimov
- The Imaginary (psychoanalysis), contrasted with The Real and The Symbolic by Jacques Lacan
- The social imaginary, a concept in sociology

== See also ==
- Imaginary (disambiguation)
