= Tha Blue Carpet Treatment =

Studio album by Snoop Dogg
- Released: November 21, 2006
- Recorded: November 2005 – September 2006
- Studios: Doggystyle Records Studio, Diamond Bar, Los Angeles, California – Los Angeles, California – New York City – Atlanta, Georgia
- Genres: West Coast hip-hop; gangsta rap; G-funk
- Length: 77:50
- Labels: Doggy Style; Geffen
- Producers: 1500; Akon; DJ Battlecat; Brainz; Chris Goodman; Danja; DJ DDT-Da Busta; DJ Pooh; Dr. Dre; Fredwreck Nassar; Frequency; Jamie Foxx; Mark Batson; Mr. Porter; N8; Nottz; Rhythum D; Rick Rock; Soopafly; Stevie Wonder; Terrace Martin; The Neptunes; Timbaland

Snoop Dogg chronology
| Tha Blue Carpet Treatment Mixtape (2006) | Tha Blue Carpet Treatment (2006) | Ego Trippin' (2008) |

Singles from Tha Blue Carpet Treatment
- 1. "Vato" Released: August 15, 2006; 2. "I Wanna Love You" Released: October 5, 2006; 3. "That's That" Released: October 10, 2006; 4. "Candy" Released: December 12, 2006; 5. "Boss' Life" Released: April 10, 2007

Tha Blue Carpet Treatment is the eighth studio album by West Coast hip-hop recording artist Snoop Dogg. It was released on November 21, 2006, by Doggystyle Records and Geffen Records. Recording sessions took place from November 2005 to September 2006 in several recording studios and artists such as Dr. Dre, The Neptunes, DJ Battlecat, DJ Pooh, Timbaland, Danja, Mark Batson, Terrace Martin, and Mr. Porter appear on the album, among others.

The album debuted at number 5 on the US Billboard 200, selling 264,000 copies in its first week. Upon its release, Tha Blue Carpet Treatment received generally positive reviews from music critics. The album was promoted with Tha Blue Carpet Treatment Mixtape, which was released a few days before the official album release. It is one of Snoop Dogg’s favorite albums of his discography.

== Background ==
The title of the album, Tha Blue Carpet Treatment is a reference to the red carpet traditionally present at formal events. The blue color refers to Snoop Dogg's affiliation with the gang of Crips, who often wear blue (as opposed to the primary color, red, of their rival gang, the Bloods). The album cover underwent several revisions. In August 2006, the first concept art was revealed on Snoop Dogg's website. It features a cartoon dog (representing Snoop Dogg) displaying Crip gang signals, while standing on a blue carpet patterned-like bandana. The design has been used, which would have been the third of Snoop Dogg's album covers to use the cartoon for likeness of the rapper that was designed by his cousin Darryl Daniel. The updated version of his cover artwork was shown on the Late Show with David Letterman's 13th Anniversary Special on August 30, 2006, and that cover artwork features a parody of the famous Hollywood Sign, that reads "LONG BEACH". It has changed to its current version. Geffen posted this as the final cover for the album on their website.

Snoop Dogg directed to take the Long Beach back to its gangsta roots. The rapper told MTV.com about embracing his true nature to the album; stating, "I went right back to the 'hood", he said of his album's production. "I took it back to the basics. I've been making a lot of pop songs, lot of R&B songs. Songs that may have made my fans feel like I wavered from what I was naturally accustomed to doing. But I'm an entertainer and I entertain people and that's what I was feeling at the time. But right now, I'm feeling like going right back to the 'hood". Pharrell said that the music video for "Vato" would not only show Snoop's gangsta side, but would also tackle the issue of violence between African Americans and Hispanics in Los Angeles and call for racial unity.

Snoop Dogg also teamed up with DJs from the West, the East and the South on Tha Blue Carpet Treatment Mixtape, which was hosted by DJ Skee, DJ Whoo Kid and DJ Drama. It contained all the rumoured tracks that had been cut from the final track listing of the studio album, and was released a few weeks before the official album came out.

"Think About It" was composed by Frequency in his dorm room one and a half years prior to the album, while Frequency was a student in Virginia. The material was passed to Mike Chavez of Geffen Records, who gave it to Snoop Dogg. Snoop Dogg uses the track to show his older son—who had not chosen him as the favorite hip-hop artist when being asked—that he can still be an old school gangster rapper regarding his style if he wants to. The track, titled "Imagine" was slated to be featured on Busta Rhymes' album The Big Bang. Busta Rhymes stated in several interviews, before the release of The Big Bang, that the sample for "Imagine" was still trying to be cleared. Busta Rhymes stated that he was not sure that the sample would be cleared on time for his album's release, so it had to be excluded from his album. With the sample not being cleared at the time, and it is presumable that the song was given to Snoop Dogg for his album. It was recorded with verses by Kam and Snoop Dogg (in different from the album version) while playing during TBCT Listening party. Although Busta Rhymes released the remix to "Imagine", it is presumable that his "remix" when it was actually the intended original version which did not make it on the release of The Big Bang. Artists such as Nas, Ja Rule and Black-Ty each did their freestyles on this track.

== Music ==
"Which One of You" was recorded during the album sessions at its process, with the group called N.V. The song was run by the production team 1500. "Round Here" contains the same sample of the song "Thank You" performed by Dido, in which became the same sample that was used by fellow American rapper Eminem for his track Stan. Therefore, Snoop Dogg wasn't aware about this matter when he was making that record during its recording sessions. "L.A.X." contains a sample of "More Bounce to the Ounce" performed by Zapp, in which Snoop Dogg already have used this sample of a song once on one of his earlier track, "Snoop Bounce", in which was included from his album Tha Doggfather (1996). All three songs – "That's That Shit", "Boss' Life" and "Imagine" – has lyrics ghostwritten from a former Aftermath Entertainment artists such as Stat Quo (Benton, S.) and The D.O.C. (Curry, T.).

== Recording ==
Snoop Dogg told Billboard, that he was working on this album, Tha Blue Carpet Treatment, for nine months. He has collaborated with the likes of R. Kelly on the biggest song on the album, titled "That's That" produced by Nottz and other featured on the album Ice Cube, Pharrell, D'Angelo, Akon, Nate Dogg, B-Real (of Cypress Hill) and even Stevie Wonder. He also confirmed that Dr. Dre had a big input on this album, producing several tracks and even rapping a verse on the track, "Imagine". Dr. Dre hadn't produced any Snoop Dogg tracks since 2000. He also did "I Wanna Fuck You" with Akon, but had to release a cleaned up version for radio play called I Wanna Love You.

Other songs recorded for this album didn't make the final cut, including "Wannabes" featuring Young Jeezy and Nate Dogg; produced by DJ Quik, "Smokin' Smokin' Weed" featuring Ray J, Slim Thug, Shorty Mack and Nate Dogg, and "Put This Thang on You" featuring Ne-Yo, only two of these (except on "You Put This Thang") are released in disc two that is, in the disc of bonus tracks.

== Critical reception ==
Professional ratings
Aggregate scores
| Source | Rating |
|---|---|
| Metacritic | 70/100 |
Review scores
| Source | Rating |
| AllMusic | 4/5 stars |
| The A.V. Club | B+ |
| The Boston Phoenix | 3/4 stars |
| Entertainment Weekly | B+ |
| Okayplayer | 4/5 stars |
| Pitchfork | 7.5/10 |
| Rolling Stone | 3/5 stars |
| USA Today | 3.5/4 stars |
| Vibe | 4/5 stars |
| XXL | (XL) |

Tha Blue Carpet Treatment received generally positive reviews from music critics. The album maintained generally positive reviews with IGN calling it "one of Snoop's strongest efforts in a long time, with the beats, rhymes, and guests all complimenting the Doggfather with grand immediacy." It received a 4 out of 5 from AllHipHop, About.com and AllMusic. Ryan Dombal for Entertainment Weekly wrote that "Blue Carpet finds him refocused and reunited with Dr. Dre on four tracks. The two get nostalgic on standout 'Imagine'." – Grade: B+ Vibe magazine wrote that "Tha Blue Carpet Treatment stands as a strong statement from a veteran still pushing his artistic boundaries." Blender wrote that the album is "A throwback to his trunk-rattling G-funk heyday." – Grade: 3.5 out of five stars. XXL wrote that "Snoop's lyrical fire seems resurrected, as he delivers arguably his most consistently scorching work post-Doggystyle."

Christian Hoard for Rolling Stone wrote that Snoop's eighth LP doesn't do much to break the trend. The production is pretty hot, with high-def beats that range from tricked-out funk (Dr. Dre's "Boss's Life") to dark, tense bounce (the excellent Neptunes-produced "Vato"). The radio-friendly ups—the R. Kelly feature "That's That Shit"—balance out brawny head-nodders like "Gangbangin 101." Snoop sounds great dropping streams of consonants on "Think About It," and few rappers could make a minimalist "Drop It Like It's Hot"-style cut like "Candy (Drippin' Like Water)" sound so singular.

Nathan Rabin for The A.V. Club reviewed the album and wrote that "Snoop has always been able to knock out infectious radio singles, but his albums generally strand a few knockout songs amid oceans of lazy filler, opportunist trend-hopping, and derivative, second-rate G-funk. Sleepy, anticlimactic recent reunion albums from Dogg Pound and 213 (Snoop, Warren G, and Nate Dogg) failed to rouse Snoop out of his longstanding professional funk. So why does Snoop's shockingly good Tha Blue Carpet Treatment sound more like a loose, revitalized follow-up to Doggystyle? Dr. Dre's reappearance certainly doesn't hurt. Dre has always brought out the best in Snoop, and his presence seems to have reignited Snoop's passion and hunger. No track better exemplifies the disc's ethos of delirious excess than "Candy (Drippin' Like Water)", an insanely catchy candy-coated R&B song with clever nods to hyphy (E-40 and producer Rick Rock) and retro jazz-rap (check out that crazy Digable Planets sample!), plus guest raps from a small army of past-their-prime gangstas. When faced with a choice, Snoop here inevitably chooses all of the above. So Treatment gives listeners Dr. Dre and The Neptunes, The Game and Ice Cube, red-hot polygamy enthusiast Akon and old standby Nate Dogg, George Clinton and Stevie Wonder, gangsta shit, pimp shit, and at least one song encouraging pee-wee football players to go hard or go home. With his lush Blue Carpet Treatment, Snoop Dogg finally seems intent on building and expanding his musical legacy, rather than merely coasting on it.

== Commercial performance ==
Tha Blue Carpet Treatment debuted at number 5 on the US Billboard 200, selling 264,000 copies in its first week. On the Nielsen SoundScan annual "Best Sellers Top 100" rankings, the album was listed 97th with the 2006 year-end catalog closing sales number of 637,000 copies despite having been released in mid-November and its sales data were accumulated for only one and a half months. As of June 2018, the album had sales 903,000 copies in the United States.

== Track listing ==
| No. | Title | Writer(s) | Producer(s) | Length |
|---|---|---|---|---|
| 1. | "Intrology" (featuring George Clinton) | Calvin Broadus, Jr.; George Clinton; Kevin Gilliam | DJ Battlecat | 1:59 |
| 2. | "Think About It" | Broadus, Jr.; Bryan Fryzel | Frequency | 3:37 |
| 3. | "Crazy" (featuring Nate Dogg) | Broadus, Jr.; Nathaniel Hale; Farid Nassar | Fredwreck | 4:26 |
| 4. | "Vato" (featuring B-Real) | Broadus, Jr.; Louis Freese; Chad Hugo; Pharrell Williams | The Neptunes | 4:44 |
| 5. | "That's That Shit" (featuring R. Kelly) | Broadus, Jr.; Robert Kelly; Dominick Lamb; Stanley Benton; Tracy Curry | Nottz | 4:17 |
| 6. | "Candy" (featuring E-40, MC Eiht, Goldie Loc, Daz Dillinger, and Kurupt) | Broadus, Jr.; Earl Stevens; Aaron Tyler; Keiwan "Goldie Loc" Spillman; Delmar Arnaud; Ricardo Brown; Ricardo Thomas | Rick Rock | 4:48 |
| 7. | "Get a Light" (featuring Damian Marley) | Broadus, Jr.; Damian Marley; Timothy Mosley; Floyd Nathaniel Hills | Timbaland; Danja | 3:41 |
| 8. | "Gangbangin' 101" (featuring The Game) | Broadus, Jr.; Jayceon Taylor; Terrace Martin | Martin | 4:01 |
| 9. | "Boss' Life" (featuring Akon^{1}) | Broadus, Jr.; Aliaune Thiam; Andre Young | Dr. Dre | 3:22 |
| 10. | "LAX" (featuring Ice Cube) | Broadus, Jr.; O'Shea Jackson, Jr.; Gilliam; Roger Troutman | DJ Battlecat | 3:21 |
| 11. | "10 Lil' Crips" | Broadus, Jr.; Hugo; Williams | The Neptunes | 3:15 |
| 12. | "Round Here" | Broadus, Jr.; Young; Dido Armstrong | Dr. Dre | 3:42 |
| 13. | "A Bitch I Knew" | Broadus, Jr.; David "Rhythum D" Weldon | Rhythum D | 4:32 |
| 14. | "Like This" (featuring Western Union and LaToiya Williams) | Broadus, Jr.; Terence "Western Union" Harden; LaToiya Williams; Priest Brooks; Damani Washington | Soopafly | 3:56 |
| 15. | "Which One of You" (featuring Nine Inch Dix) | Broadus, Jr.; David "Jelly Roll" Drew; Donald Smith; Lenton Hutton; Brooks; Christopher "Brody" Brown; Kenneth "Bam" Alexander; Lamar Edwards; Larrance Dopson; Charles "Uncle Chucc" Hamilton | 1500 | 3:32 |
| 16. | "I Wanna Love You" (featuring Akon) | Broadus, Jr.; Thiam | Akon | 2:59 |
| 17. | "Psst!" (featuring Jamie Foxx) | Broadus, Jr.; Eric Bishop | N8; Brainz; Jamie Foxx | 2:59 |
| 18. | "Beat Up on Yo Pads" | Broadus, Jr.; Denaun Porter; Desmond "DJ DDT-Da Busta" Travis | Mr. Porter; DJ DDT-Da Busta | 2:57 |
| 19. | "Don't Stop" (featuring Warzone and Kurupt) | Broadus, Jr.; Tyler; Craig "Kam" Miller; Spillman; R. Brown; Chris "THX" Goodman | Goodman | 3:22 |
| 20. | "Imagine" (featuring Dr. Dre and D'Angelo) | Broadus, Jr.; Young; Michael Archer; Mark Batson | Dr. Dre; Batson | 4:42 |
| 21. | "Conversations" (featuring Stevie Wonder) | Broadus, Jr.; Stevie Wonder; Mark Jordan | DJ Pooh; Wonder | 3:38 |
| Total length: | | | | 77:50 |

=== Bonus tracks ===
| No. | Title | Length |
|---|---|---|
| 1. | "Got My Own" (featuring Swizz Beatz) |
| 2. | "Wanna Be" (featuring Nate Dogg and Young Jeezy) |
| 3. | "That's That (Remix)" (featuring Nas and R Kelly) |
| 4. | "Imagine (Remix)" (featuring D'Angelo, Dr. Dre, and Ja Rule) |
| 5. | "Do It" |
| 6. | "Life" (featuring The Emotions) |

Notes

- ^{1} On the single version, Akon's guest vocals were replaced by vocals from Nate Dogg.

Sample credits

- "Intrology" samples "Dirt off Your Shoulder" performed by Jay-Z.
- "Think About It" samples "I Need You" performed by The Impressions.
- "Crazy" contains interpolations of "She's Strange" performed by Cameo.
- "That's That Shit samples "The Bath" performed by Nile Rodgers.
- "Candy (Drippin' Like Water)" samples "9th Wonder (Blackploitism)" performed by Digable Planets, and contains an interpolations of "Candy" performed by Cameo.
- "Boss' Life" samples "If Tomorrow Never Comes" performed by The Controllers, and "Everybody Rise" performed by Busta Rhymes.
- "LAX" samples "Going Back to Cali" performed by The Notorious B.I.G., and "More Bounce to the Ounce" performed by Zapp.
- "Round Here" samples "Thank You" performed by Dido.
- "Like This" samples "Coffy Sauna" performed by Roy Ayers.
- "Conversations" samples "Have a Talk with God" performed by Stevie Wonder.

== Personnel ==
Credits adapted from Allmusic.

- Akon – vocals, engineer, producer
- B Real – vocals
- Bad Lucc – vocals
- Mark Batson – keyboards, producer
- Mike Bozzi – assistant
- Leslie Brathwaite – mixing
- Paul Bruski – engineer
- Mike Chav – engineer
- Ted Chung – A&R, engineer, marketing
- George Clinton – vocals
- Erik "Baby Jesus" Coomes – bongos
- Sean Cruse – bass
- Damani – vocals
- Rick DeVarona – assistant
- DJ DDT – producer
- DJ Pooh – engineer, mixing, producer, vocal engineer
- Dr. Dre – vocals, producer, mixing
- Nate Dogg – vocals
- Shon Don – engineer
- E-40 – vocals
- Lamar Edwards – bass guitar
- Jamie Foxx – vocals, producer
- The Game – vocals
- Abel Garibaldi – engineer
- Tasha Hayward – hair stylist
- Josh Houghkirk – assistant
- Richard Huredia – mixing
- Ice Cube – vocals
- Mauricio Iragorri – engineer, mixing
- Julio G – vocals, interlude
- Kam – vocals
- R. Kelly – vocals
- Kurupt – vocals
- Anthony Mandler – art direction, design, photography
- Deborah Mannis-Gardner – sample clearance
- Damian Marley – vocals
- MC Eiht – vocals
- Jeff Meeks – assistant
- Ian Mereness – engineer
- Raul Midón – guitar, trumpet
- Fredwreck – producer
- 9 Inch Dix – vocals
- Dawaun Parker – keyboards
- Orlando Rashid – engineer
- Robert "Roomio" Reyes – assistant
- J. Peter Robinson – art direction, design
- April Roomet – stylist
- Alexis Seton – mixing
- Snoop Dogg – primary artist
- Soopafly – vocals, producer
- Chris Soper – engineer
- Chris Starr – background vocals
- Phil Tan – mixing
- Timbaland – producer
- Warzone – vocals
- LaToiya Williams – vocals
- Marlon Williams – guitar
- Barbara Wilson – vocals
- Stevie Wonder – vocals, producer
- Young Jeezy – vocals

== Charts ==
=== Weekly charts ===
Weekly chart performance for Tha Blue Carpet Treatment
| Chart (2006) | Peak position |
|---|---|
| Australian Albums (ARIA) | 56 |
| Austrian Albums (Ö3 Austria) | 48 |
| Belgian Albums (Ultratop Flanders) | 46 |
| Belgian Albums (Ultratop Wallonia) | 86 |
| Canadian Albums (Billboard) | 10 |
| Danish Albums (Hitlisten) | 28 |
| Dutch Albums (Album Top 100) | 53 |
| French Albums (SNEP) | 8 |
| German Albums (Offizielle Top 100) | 41 |
| Italian Albums (FIMI) | 56 |
| Norwegian Albums (VG-lista) | 18 |
| New Zealand Albums (RMNZ) | 20 |
| Polish Albums (ZPAV) | 37 |
| Scottish Albums (Official Charts) | 57 |
| Swiss Albums (Schweizer Hitparade) | 12 |
| UK Albums (Official Charts) | 47 |
| UK Album Downloads (Official Charts) | 15 |
| UK R&B Albums (Official Charts) | 8 |
| US Billboard 200 | 5 |
| US Top R&B/Hip-Hop Albums (Billboard) | 2 |
| US Top Rap Albums (Billboard) | 2 |
| US Indie Store Album Sales (Billboard) | 3 |

=== Year-end charts ===
Year-end chart performance for Tha Blue Carpet Treatment
| Chart (2007) | Position |
|---|---|
| Australian Urban Albums (ARIA) | 41 |
| US Billboard 200 | 54 |
| US Top R&B/Hip-Hop Albums (Billboard) | 15 |
| US Top Rap Albums (Billboard) | 8 |

== Certifications ==
| Region | Certification | Certified units/sales |
|---|---|---|
| Canada (Music Canada) | Gold | 50,000^{^} |
| Denmark (IFPI Danmark) | Platinum | 20,000^{‡} |
| France (SNEP) | Gold | 75,000^{*} |
| Russia (NFPF) | Gold | 10,000^{*} |
| United Kingdom (BPI) | Silver | 60,000^{^} |
| United States (RIAA) | Gold | 500,000 |
^{*} Sales figures based on certification alone.^{^} Shipments figures based on certification alone.^{‡} Sales+streaming figures based on certification alone.
