= How to Sink Slowly =

Studio album by Brokenteeth
- Released: February 23, 2023
- Genre: Shoegaze; post-rock
- Length: 47:19
- Label: Poclanos
- Producer: Brokenteeth

Brokenteeth chronology
The Letters (2021)	How to Sink Slowly (2023)

Singles from How to Sink Slowly
- 1. "Spring" Released: 2 August 2022; 2. "Heaven Express(again)" Released: 20 December 2022

How to Sink Slowly (Korean: 추락은 천천히; RR: Choorageun cheoncheonhi) is the second studio album by South Korean shoegaze musician Brokenteeth. The album was released on 23 February 2023.

== Critical reception ==
Professional ratings
Review scores
Source	Rating
Sputnikmusic	4.0/5

Sunnyvale of Sputnikmusic described the album as "No matter how beautiful a given moment gets, there remains a sort of ambivalence about the proceedings." Pop music critic Seojeongmingab commented, "His music stands on the side of everyone who experienced and handled the moment by beautifully embodying even the moment of fall." Yoo Seongeun of Music Y reviewed the track 138 of the album and said, "The lyrical melody and soft voice are barely audible, and most of the space is occupied by the lazy stroke sound of the electric guitar, and in the chaotic mind, emotions such as sentimentalness and sadness that you could feel when listening to Radiohead's album in the early days are swirling."

== Track listing ==
No.	Title	Length
1.	"The Sun is Setting" (해는 지고 있는데)	5:00
2.	"138"	4:34
3.	"Walkerrrr…"	2:56
4.	"Sunset Strike" ("노을폭격")	5:06
5.	"Two Lines" ("동상이몽")	4:21
6.	"Sleepwalk to Sink" ("추락")	6:12
7.	"Farewell to a Long Night"	2:19
8.	"Heaven Express(again)"	4:46
9.	"Spring"	7:27
10.	"How to Avoid the Bends" ("잠수병")	4:38
