= Mort Shuman =

American songwriter (1938–1991)

Background information
- Born: November 12, 1938; Brooklyn, New York, U.S.
- Died: November 2, 1991 (aged 52) London, England
- Genres: Rock and roll
- Occupations: Singer, pianist, songwriter
- Spouses: Élisabeth Moreau (m. 1974; div. 1979): Maria-Pia Vezia; (m. c. 1982)

Mortimer Shuman (November 12, 1938 – November 2, 1991) was an American singer, pianist and songwriter, best known as co-writer of many 1960s rock and roll hits, including "Viva Las Vegas". He also wrote and sang many songs in French, such as "Le Lac Majeur", "Papa-Tango-Charly", "Sha Mi Sha", "Un Été de Porcelaine", and "Brooklyn by the Sea" which became hits in France and several other European countries. Shuman wrote over 500 songs, including those for Ben E. King, Elvis Presley, Ray Charles, Andy Williams, and Janis Joplin. He was also responsible for the English-language production of Jacques Brel is Alive and Well and Living in Paris. Shuman was posthumously inducted into the Songwriters Hall of Fame in 1992 and the Rock and Roll Hall of Fame in 2010.

== Early life ==
Mortimer Shuman was born in Brooklyn, New York, United States, on November 12, 1938, to Polish Jewish immigrant parents. His parents, Louis and Esther, were poor.

Jewish immigrants from Eastern Europe moved to Brooklyn, where Shuman lived in an apartment near the sea. Shuman was taller than peers of the same age. Like other Brooklyn residents, Shuman spoke Yiddish.

He learned English at the end of grade school. At the age of 18, he decided to begin writing lyrics. Shuman attended Abraham Lincoln High School.

He chose music as his field and consequently abandoned his studies in philosophy. He attended the New York Conservatory, where he studied classical music.

Shuman left the borough and headed toward "the lights of Manhattan" thanks to the English he had learned.

== Career ==
In Harlem, Shuman became a fan of rhythm and blues music in the clubs, and after meeting Doc Pomus, the two men teamed up to compose for Aldon Music at offices in New York City's Brill Building. Their songwriting collaboration saw Pomus write the lyrics and Shuman the melody, though each occasionally worked on both. Their compositions would be recorded by artists such as Dion, the Flamingos, Andy Williams, Bobby Darin, Fabian, Ajda Pekkan, the Drifters, and Elvis Presley, among others. Their most famous songs include "A Teenager in Love", "Turn Me Loose", "This Magic Moment", "Save the Last Dance for Me", "Little Sister", "Can't Get Used to Losing You", "(Marie's the Name) His Latest Flame", "Viva Las Vegas" and "Sweets for My Sweet".

With the advent of the British Invasion, they moved to London, where they penned songs for a number of British musicians. After his partnership with Doc Pomus ended in 1965, Shuman moved to Paris, France, where he wrote songs for Johnny Hallyday and launched his own recording career. Shuman wrote songs for Eddy Mitchell and Michel Sardou.

He also wrote a couple of hits in the UK (including the Small Faces' "Sha-La-La-La-Lee" and Cilla Blacks' "Love's Just A Broken Heart", both co-written with Kenny Lynch), as well as a musical, Budgie (lyrics by Don Black). With the Welsh songwriter Clive Westlake, he wrote "Here I Go Again", which was recorded by the Hollies. Billy J. Kramer enjoyed success with another Shuman song, "Little Children".

In 1968, Shuman teamed with Eric Blau and adapted the French lyrics of songs by the Belgian composer Jacques Brel used as the basis of the successful off-Broadway production Jacques Brel is Alive and Well and Living in Paris. Some of the songs from the show were subsequently recorded by Scott Walker, including "Jackie" and "Mathilde", and by David Bowie, including "My Death" and "Amsterdam".

During the 1970s, Shuman enjoyed "great success" in France with his best-known songs, such as "Le Lac Majeur", "Un été de porcelaine", and "Papa-Tango-Charly".

Shuman appeared in both the stage revue and the 1975 film adaptation. This was followed the next year with work on the soundtrack of the film Sex O'Clock U.S.A., which is notable for featuring one of the earliest known gay songs, "You're My Man," while another one of his compositions from the soundtrack, "Baby Come On" (billed under the Sex O'Clock U.S.A. name during its chart run) become a modest hit on Billboard's Disco chart, peaking at number 37 in July 1977. He also did many collaborations with the Israeli singer Mike Brant, and composed film scores, often French movies, including A Day at the Beach (1970), Romance of a Horsethief (1971), Black Thursday (1974), À nous les petites Anglaises (1976), Monsieur Papa (1977) and The More It Goes, the Less It Goes (1977). He also worked occasionally as an actor, notably appearing with Jodie Foster in The Little Girl Who Lives Down the Lane (for which he also served as musical supervisor).

"Sorrow" was another of his well-known songs, which he performed on January 14, 1978, during TF1's Numéro Un, the variety show of Maritie and Gilbert Carpentier.

In 2019, journalist Jean-Alphonse Richard said that Shuman "was never a star, but a clandestine worker of song: a man who fabricated hits on an assembly line... Too modest to claim gleaming paternity for it".

== Personal life ==
While living in France, he met Élisabeth Moreau, daughter of Claude Moreau, co-director of Larousse publishing. Shuman and Moreau married on September 28, 1974, in Villiers-Saint-Benoît, France. The couple worked together, co-writing some songs, including "My Name is Mortimer" and "La Lampe". Shuman and Moreau divorced in 1979.

During a stay in Arcachon, France, he met a woman from Bordeaux, Maria-Pia Vezia. Shuman and Vezia became engaged in December 1980. He married her, and they lived together in the Bordelaise region of France. Maria-Pia Shuman was his last wife.

He had four daughters.

His third language was French, whose sounds he adored.

He had been living in London since 1986, where he had stopped drinking alcohol, and where he had also released an album and staged two musicals.

Colette Godard of Le Monde described him as a man who "never knew how to say no to a friend, even knowing he wouldn't be paid. He loves to share; his generosity is disorderly, his disorder generous".

In 1991, Shuman underwent liver surgery. He was hospitalized again two weeks before his death.

== Death ==
On November 2, 1991, Shuman died in a London hospital following liver surgery. According to Colin Larkin, his cancer proved fatal. His funeral took place in the suburbs of London. Halliday placed on the coffin a cassette tape containing a song titled "Dans un an ou un jour" (lit. 'In a Year or a Day'), written by Shuman for him and recorded shortly before his death, his last composition, but of which he never heard the final version.

A few years later, his remains were transferred to the vault of his in-laws, at the Pins-Francs cemetery, in the Caudéran district of Bordeaux.

== Awards and honors ==
César Awards 1977: nominated for Best Music for À nous les petites Anglaises.

On May 27, 1992, he was inducted into the Songwriters Hall of Fame at the 23rd annual Induction and Awards Dinner held at the Sheraton New York Hotel and Towers.

On March 15, 2010, Shuman was inducted into the Rock and Roll Hall of Fame during the 25th annual induction ceremony at the Waldorf Astoria Hotel in New York. He was one of the 2010 recipients of the Ahmet Ertegun Award from the Rock and Roll Hall of Fame. He joined his early collaborator Doc Pomus, who was inducted in 1992.

== Selected discography ==
Albums

- Jacques Brel Is Alive and Well and Living in Paris (1968) with Eric Blau
- My Death (1969)
- Amerika (1972)
- Voilà Comment... (1973)
- Des Chansons Sentimentales (1974)
- Imagine (1976) - certified Gold in France
- À Nous les Petites Anglaises! (1976) Soundtrack
- My Name Is Mortimer (1977)
- Le Nègre Blanc (1979)
- Slave (1980)
- Lumières d'Amour (1982)
- Pharaon (1984)
- Distant Drum (1991)

Singles

- "Le Lac Majeur" (1972) (a Number One hit in the Netherlands in 1973)
- "La Splendeur de Rome" (1974)
- "Sorrow" (1976)
- "Machines" (1980)

== Selected filmography ==
(As composer unless otherwise stated)

- A Day at the Beach (1970)
- Romance of a Horsethief (1971)
- Black Thursday (1974)
- Jacques Brel is Alive and Well and Living in Paris (1975) (Actor and lyricist)
- The Little Girl Who Lives Down the Lane (1976) (Actor)
- A Guy Like Me Should Never Die (1976) (Actor and composer)
- Let's Get Those English Girls (1976)
- Game of Seduction (1976)
- A Real Young Girl (1976)
- High Street (1976) (Actor and composer)
- La Nuit de Saint-Germain-des-Prés (1977) (Actor and composer)
- The More It Goes, the Less It Goes (1977) (Actor and composer)
- Monsieur Papa (1977)
- Holiday Hotel (1978)
- The Associate (1979)
- Psy (1981)
- Cent Francs L'amour (1986)

== Notes ==
- Bloom, Ken. American song. The complete musical theater companion. 1877–1995, Vol. 2, 2nd edition, Schirmer Books, 1996.
- Larkin, Colin. The Encyclopedia of Popular Music, Third edition, Macmillan, 1998.
- Stambler, Irwin. Encyclopedia of Pop, Rock and Soul, St. Martin's Press, 1974.
