= Candy (Drippin' Like Water) =

Single by Snoop Dogg featuring E-40, MC Eiht, Goldie Loc and Tha Dogg Pound

from the album Tha Blue Carpet Treatment
- Released: December 12, 2006
- Recorded: 2005
- Genre: Hyphy
- Length: 4:26; 4:14 (Music video)
- Label: Geffen; Doggystyle
- Songwriters: Arnaud, D.; Blackman, L.; Broadus, C.; Brown, R.; Butler, I.; Emmanuel, R.; Irving, C.; Stephens, E.; Vieira, M. Ann; Spillman, K.; Tyler, A.; Thomas, R.
- Producer: Rick Rock

Snoop Dogg singles chronology
| "Hollywood Divorce" (2006) | "Candy (Drippin' Like Water)" (2006) | "Boss' Life" (2007) |

E-40 singles chronology
| "Oh Yeah (Work)" (2006) | "Candy (Drippin' Like Water)" (2006) | "Wake It Up" (2008) |

Tha Dogg Pound singles chronology
| "Cali Iz Active" (2006) | "Candy (Drippin' Like Water)" (2006) |

"Candy (Drippin' Like Water)" is the third single by Snoop Dogg from his 2006 album Tha Blue Carpet Treatment, produced by Rick Rock. It features E-40, MC Eiht, Goldie Loc and Tha Dogg Pound (Daz Dillinger and Kurupt), and Ladybug on the chorus. The song title and sample come from Ladybug Mecca's vocals on Digable Planets's "9th Wonder (Blackitolism)". "Candy" refers to a high gloss paint finish applied to automobiles. In the song it is also used as a euphemism for marijuana, cocaine and sex.

== Music video ==
The video was filmed on Hollywood Boulevard in Hollywood, Los Angeles. The women in it wore different colored wigs. It features a lot of candy and a Snoop Dogg plaque. It has cameo appearances by Kam, JT The Bigga Figga and Ladybug who adlibs the choruses.

== Track listing ==
=== A-side ===
1. "Vato" (Radio edit)
2. "Vato" (Radio edit #2 (extra clean))
3. "Vato" (LP)
4. "Vato" (Instrumental)

=== B-side ===
1. "Candy (Drippin' Like Water)" (LP)
2. "Candy (Drippin' Like Water)" (Radio)
3. "Candy (Drippin' Like Water)" (Instrumental)
4. "Candy (Drippin' Like Water)" (A cappella)

== Personnel ==
- Written by C. Broadus, E. Stephens, K. Spillman, D. Arnaud, R. Brown, A. Tyler, R. Thomas, R. Emmanuel, Butler, Vieira, Irving, L. Blackmon, T. Jenkins)
- Produced by RickRock for Sharick & Mook Inc.
- Publishers: My Own Chit Publishing/EMI Blackwood Music (BMI); Heavy On The Grind Entertainment Publishing (BMI); Lil Gangsta Music (ASCAP); Dogg Pound Music (BMI); Scodie Mac (BMI); Gaffled Em Up (BMI); Cypher Cliff Music Publishing (ASCAP); EMI
- Video Production : Snoopadelic Films
- Video director : Pook Brown of Soopadelic Films
- Video appearance of JT the Bigga Figga is by the courtesy of Get Low Recordz.
