= Stalled Flutes, Means =

Studio album by Asian Glow
- Released: June 13, 2022
- Genre: Indie Rock, emo, shoegaze
- Length: 59:59
- Label: Longinus Recordings
- Producer: Asian Glow

Asian Glow chronology
Weatherglow (2022)	Stalled Flutes, Means (2022)	Paraglow (2022)

Singles from Stalled Flutes, Means
- 1. "Sneezing : Seasonal Creators" Released: 23 May 2022

Stalled Flutes, Means (stylised in Stalled Flutes, means) is the third studio album by South Korean rock singer-songwriter Asian Glow. The album was released on 13 June 2022, and Sneezing: Seasonal Creators was released as a single prior to the album's release.

== Critical reception ==
Professional ratings
Review scores
Source	Rating
Sputnikmusic	4.1/5

JohnnyoftheWell of Sputnikmusic reviewed "Though tallest and most majestic, it’s just one moment on an album teeming with moments building and moments escaping: grasp one, however fleetingly and you can grasp them all." Jay Honeycomb, the critic of PopMatters and No Transmission described the album as "The confidence he has in his craft typically comes with hard-won struggles and failures. On the other hand, the songs have a youthful passion, like Asian Glow is really "going for it""

== Track listing ==
No.	Title	Length
1.	"Lit Lips the Bracken"	6:03
2.	"Sneezing : Seasonal Creators"	3:46
3.	"Faltering Waver"	5:58
4.	"Station Blue / Broiled Wrist"	4:45
5.	"When Summer"	5:46
6.	"Curled From the Roots Pt. 2"	4:09
7.	"Sneezing Pt. 2"	1:11
8.	"Stalled Flutes, Means"	4:11
9.	"Ashpit Nowhere"	4:39
10.	"Look Close, Nose the Reflection"	9:06
11.	"If It's Okay to Cry"	4:43
12.	"End by Forever"	5:42
Total length:		59:59
