= Imaginary =

Imaginary may refer to:

- Imaginary (sociology), a concept in sociology
- The Imaginary (psychoanalysis), a concept by Jacques Lacan
- Imaginary number, a concept in mathematics
- Imaginary time, a concept in physics
- Imagination, a mental faculty
- Object of the mind, an object of the imagination

== Music ==
- Imaginary Records, a record label
- "Imaginary", a song by Evanescence from Fallen
- "Imaginary", a song by Imran Khan best video and best song Pakistani Music and Media Awards (PMMA)
- "Imaginary", a song by Peace from Happy People
- "Imaginary", a song by Brennan Heart with Jonathan Mendelsohn

== Other ==
- The Imaginary (Sartre), a 1940 philosophical work by Jean-Paul Sartre
- Imaginary (exhibition), a mathematical art exhibition by the Mathematisches Forschungsinstitut Oberwolfach
- Imaginary (film), a 2024 American supernatural horror film directed by Jeff Wadlow
- The Imaginary (film), a 2023 Japanese animated fantasy film directed by Yoshiyuki Momose

== See also ==
- The Imaginary (disambiguation)
- Imagination (disambiguation)
- Imagine (disambiguation)
