= Seeking Darkness =

Studio album by Huremic
- Released: 13 March 2025
- Genre: Post-rock; noise rock; experimental rock
- Length: 1:00:00
- Label: Self-released
- Producer: Huremic

Huremic chronology
Seeking Darkness (2025)	3. How I See Nothing But You; (2025)

Seeking Darkness is an album by the South Korean shoegaze musician Parannoul under the pseudonym Huremic. It was independently released on 13 March 2025.

== Background and composition ==
The album is divided into five chronologically-numbered tracks which feature a more aggressive and abrasive sound than much of Parannoul's previous work. The album is mostly instrumental, with some sparse usage of vocals.

The album was partly created using virtual instruments developed at the Seoul National University Centre for Arts and Science. The composition of the third track was influenced by the South Korean avant-garde band Ureuk and the Gypsies. Huremic stated that he was inspired to create the album after watching Osamu Tezuka's manga Buddha.

== Reception ==
Professional ratings
Review scores
Source	Rating
Pitchfork	7.3/10
OndaRock	7.5/10

The album received positive reviews from music critics. Patrick Lyons of Pitchfork described the album's tracks as "five murky, cacophonous compositions" which "often gently meander or abruptly shift, and sometimes do both within the span of a couple minutes." Michele Corrado of OndaRock emphasised the album's departure from Parannoul's usual sound, calling the album "a mad and meticulous work". Chris DeVille of Stereogum said that the album "has some of the epic scope and headblown noisiness of Parannoul's main catalog, but — true to its name — it's darker and more aggressive, with a focus on hard-pounding repetition that reminds me of Boredoms."

== Track listing ==
Seeking Darkness track listing
No.	Title	Length
1.	"Seeking Darkness Pt. 1"	14:15
2.	"Seeking Darkness Pt. 2"	11:33
3.	"Seeking Darkness Pt. 3"	13:33
4.	"Seeking Darkness Pt. 4"	11:27
5.	"Seeking Darkness Pt. 5"	9:12
Total length:		1:00:00
