= Tha Blue Carpet Treatment Mixtape =

Mixtape by Snoop Dogg
- Released: November 18, 2006
- Genre: West Coast hip-hop; gangsta rap; G-funk
- Length: 77:24
- Label: Doggystyle; CMP Entertainment
- Compiler: DJ Whoo Kid; DJ Drama; DJ Skee

Snoop Dogg chronology
R&G (Rhythm & Gangsta): The Masterpiece (2004)	Tha Blue Carpet Treatment Mixtape (2006)	Tha Blue Carpet Treatment (2006)

Tha Blue Carpet Treatment Mixtape is a mixtape by American West Coast hip-hop artist Snoop Dogg; it was released on November 18, 2006. The mixtape contains appearances from Nate Dogg, Ice Cube, Young Jeezy, Game, Xzibit, Flavor Flav, B. Real, Warzone, Western Union, Daz Dillinger, E-40, Goldie Loc, Kurupt, J. Wells, MC Eiht, Swizz Beatz, Lil Wayne, Big Daddy Kane and Katt Williams. Tha Blue Carpet Treatment Mixtape was released as a prelude to his eighth studio album, Tha Blue Carpet Treatment.

== Track listing ==
No.	Title	Length
1.	"Intro"	1:19
2.	"Wannabes" (feat. Nate Dogg & Young Jeezy)	4:04
3.	"Bad Bitch" (feat. Flavor Flav)	3:27
4.	"Keep Bouncing" (Too $hort feat. Snoop Dogg, will.i.am & Fergie)	1:29
5.	"LAX" (feat. Ice Cube)	3:15
6.	"Interlude"	0:45
7.	"Look Around"	3:40
8.	"Vato" (feat. B-Real)	4:45
9.	"California Vacation" (The Game feat. Snoop Dogg & Xzibit)	4:24
10.	"Real Shit"	2:46
11.	"Skit"	0:36
12.	"Territory" (feat. Brotha Lynch Hung)	3:18
13.	"Get A Light" (feat. Timbaland)	0:54
14.	"That's That Shit" (feat. R. Kelly)	4:00
15.	"Killas" (feat. Western Union & War Zone)	4:43
16.	"Gangbangin' 101" (feat. The Game)	0:49
17.	"Crazy" (feat. Nate Dogg)	4:21
18.	"Real One"	3:41
19.	"Got My Own" (feat. Swizz Beatz)	3:08
20.	"Candy" (feat. Tha Dogg Pound, E-40, Goldie Loc, & MC Eiht)	4:16
21.	"All That I Need" (Daz Dillinger feat. Snoop Dogg)	1:16
22.	"Hollywood Divorce" (Outkast feat. Lil Wayne & Snoop Dogg)	3:22
23.	"We Do" (feat. Big Daddy Kane)	3:29
24.	"Long Gone"	4:22
25.	"Listen" (feat. Katt Williams)	3:02
26.	"Outro"	2:13

== Release history ==
Region	Date	Format	Label	Ref.
United States	November 18, 2006	Free Digital download	Doggystyle	
United States	March 26, 2007	CD	CMP Entertainment	
