= Vato (song) =

2006 single by Snoop Dogg

Single by Snoop Dogg featuring B-Real

from the album Tha Blue Carpet Treatment
- Released: August 15, 2006
- Recorded: 2005
- Genre: Hip-hop
- Length: 4:45
- Label: Geffen; Doggystyle; Star Trak
- Songwriters: Calvin Broadus; Pharrell Williams; Charles Hugo
- Producer: The Neptunes

Snoop Dogg singles chronology
| "Gangsta Walk" (2006) | "Vato" (2006) | "I Wanna Love You" (2006) |

B-Real singles chronology
| ""Get U Down"" (2006) | "Vato" (2006) |

Music video
- "Vato" on YouTube

"Vato" is the first single by Snoop Dogg from his album Tha Blue Carpet Treatment. The song features B-Real and was produced by the Neptunes. The word "vato" is Chicano slang for "homie".

== Background ==
The album version of "Vato" contains an introduction with Snoop Dogg saying "Man, don't you know that I'm loco?" and also some shout-outs from Julio G. Shortly after the release of the song, Snoop Dogg and B-Real would receive disses and responses by numerous Mexican rappers who mistakenly took the song as a slander towards the Chicano culture.

== Music video ==
The music video, directed by Phillip G. Atwell, premiered on BET on August 30, 2006. Williams said the video showed his gangsta side, but would also tackle the issue of racial conflict in Los Angeles between African Americans and Hispanics and call for racial unity. It features cameos by Goldie Loc, Chicano rapper Frost as well as actor Edward James Olmos. An animated video also premiered on snoopdogg.com in September.

== Remixes ==
Official

- "Vato (DJ Jam Remix)" (featuring Malverde)
- "Vato (Remix)" (featuring Lil Uno & B-Real)

== Track listing ==
=== A-side ===
1. "Vato" (Radio edit)
2. "Vato" (Radio edit #2 (extra clean))
3. "Vato" (LP)
4. "Vato" (Instrumental)

=== B-side ===
1. "Candy (Drippin' Like Water)" (LP)
2. "Candy (Drippin' Like Water)" (Radio)
3. "Candy (Drippin' Like Water)" (Instrumental)
4. "Candy (Drippin' Like Water)" (A cappella)

== Personnel ==
- Written by C. Broadus, C. Hugo, P. Williams
- Produced by the Neptunes
- Publishers: My Own Chit Publishing/EMI Blackwood Music (BMI); Waters of Nazareth Publishing/ EMI Blackwood Music, Inc. (BMI)/
- Recorded by Andrew Coleman at Chalice Studios, Los Angeles, California, Chris Jackson at The Cathedral, Hollywood, California
- Mixed by Phil Tan in the Tanning Booth at the Record Plant, Los Angeles, California and Soapbox Studios, Atlanta, Georgia
- Assisted by Josh Houghkirk Heavy Harmony Music Publishing; WB Music Corp. (ASCAP) and EMI April Music (ASCAP)

== Charts ==
Chart performance for "Vato"
| Chart (2006-2007) | Peak position |
|---|---|
| Australia (ARIA) | 55 |
| Australian Urban (ARIA) | 10 |
| Finnish Singles Chart | 3 |
| US Hot R&B/Hip-Hop Songs (Billboard) | 85 |
| US Hot Singles Sales (Billboard) | 31 |
