= Boss' Life =

Single by Snoop Dogg featuring Nate Dogg

Single by Snoop Dogg featuring Nate Dogg

from the album Tha Blue Carpet Treatment
- Released: April 10, 2007
- Recorded: 2006
- Studio: Record One, Los Angeles
- Genre: Gangsta rap; G-funk; R&B
- Length: 3:30
- Label: Geffen; Doggystyle
- Songwriters: Stanley Benton; Broadus, C.; Camon, D.; Curry, T.; Lamb, D.; Parker, D.; Smith, T.; Thiam, A.; Hale, N.; Young, A.
- Producer: Dr. Dre

Snoop Dogg singles chronology
"Candy (Drippin' Like Water)" (2007)	"Boss' Life" (2007)	"My 64" (2007)

Nate Dogg singles chronology
"Have a Party" (2006)	"Boss' Life" (2007)	"My House" (2015)

"Boss' Life"

Song by Snoop Dogg featuring Akon

from the album Tha Blue Carpet Treatment
- Released: November 21, 2006
- Recorded: 2006
- Genre: West Coast hip hop
- Length: 3:22
- Label: Geffen; Doggystyle
- Songwriters: Stanley Benton; Broadus, C.; Camon, D.; Curry, T.; Lamb, D.; Parker, D.; Smith, T.; Thiam, A.; Hale, N.; Young, A.
- Producer: Dr. Dre

"Boss' Life" is the fourth and final single from Snoop Dogg's 8th studio album Tha Blue Carpet Treatment. The song originally featured Akon, but due to label issues the original vocals were replaced by Nate Dogg's for the single version. The lyrics of Snoop Dogg were co-written by The D.O.C. It samples "If Tomorrow Never Comes" by The Controllers. This is the last single that Nate Dogg was featured on before his death in 2011.

== Personnel ==
- Written By C. Broadus, A. Thiam, N. Hale, A. Young, T. Curry, D. Camon, D. Lamb, T. Smith S. Benton, D. Parker)
- Produced by Dr. Dre.
- Published by My Own Chit Publishing/EMI Blackwood Music (BMI); Byefall Music/Famous Music Publishing (ASCAP); WB Music Corp. (ASCAP); Almo Music Corp (ASCAP); Every Knight Music Co. (BMI), Warner-Tamerlane Pub Corp. (BMI), Unichappell Music Inc. (BMI) and Teamsta Entertainment Music (BMI); YEL-NATS (BMI); Psalm 144:1 Music (BMI)
- Keyboards by Dawaun Parker
- Guitar by John “Natural” Najera

== Music video ==
The music video premiered on BET's Access Granted on March 21, 2007 which features Snoop Dogg in a mansion with girls dancing around and ending with a big puff of smoke is blown that reads "Tha Blue Carpet Treatment". The video premiered on MTV's TRL on April 17, 2007 3:30pm est & pst with Snoop Dogg and Don Magic Juan being the guests of the show.

=== Personnel ===
- Anthony Mandler, director
- Kim Bradshaw, producer
- Box Fresh, production co
- Ketil Dietrichson, cinematographer
- Jeff Selis, editor

== Charts ==
=== Weekly charts ===
Chart (2007)	Peak position
US Hot R&B/Hip-Hop Songs (Billboard)	65
US R&B/Hip-Hop Airplay (Billboard)	65
US Bubbling Under R&B/Hip-Hop Singles (Billboard) featuring Akon version	15

== Remixes ==
An official remix with additional verse by JT The Bigga Figga is available on DubCNN. It is also available on Snoop Dogg and JT the Bigga Figga's Myspace pages.
