= The More It Goes, the Less It Goes =

- French: Plus ça va, moins ça va
- Directed by: Michel Vianey
- Starring: Louis Jourdan; Jean-Pierre Marielle; Niels Arestrup; Jean Carmet
- Music by: Mort Shuman
- Release date: 1977
- Country: France
- Language: French
- Box office: $3.9 million

The More It Goes, the Less It Goes (French: Plus ça va, moins ça va) is a 1977 French film.

== Plot ==
Two police inspectors are investigating a homicide.

== Cast ==
- Jean-Pierre Marielle as Inspector Pignon
- Jean Carmet as Inspector Melville
- Niels Arestrup as Vincent
- Caroline Cartier as Sylvia Rastadelle
- Henri Garcin as Edouard Jesufard
- Louis Jourdan as Paul Tango
- Mort Shuman as Francis Million
- Helga Liné as Annie
- Nadiuska as Zuka
- Tomás Picó as Alex
- Mostéfa Stiti as Salah
- Máximo Valverde as Donald Passover
