= The Letters (album) =

Studio album by Brokenteeth
- Released: September 10, 2021
- Genre: Shoegaze; post-rock
- Length: 32:49
- Label: Poclanos
- Producer: Brokenteeth

Brokenteeth chronology
The Letters (2021)	How to Sink Slowly (2023)

The Letters (Korean: 편지; RR: Pyeonji) is the debut studio album by South Korean shoegaze musician Brokenteeth. The album was released on 10 September 2021.

== Background ==
The Letters was first released in the form of a demo album and was later released as a studio album. Brokenteeth explained that The Letters is an album that contains stories like letters that have never been told, which have been burned down in the end. The album was re-released as vinyl in 2023.

== Critical reception ==
Web magazine Highjinkx described the album as a work that not only harmonises noise, but also warms felt in the lyrics and guitar performance. Na Wonyoung, editor of Weiv praised the fact that the various types of noise and noise of the album become handwriting and sentences, presenting themselves, but that the stronger one does not completely cover everything. Music Y rated the album as one of the 2021 rookies.

== Track listing ==
No.	Title	Length
1.	"Unsent Letters(blank)" ("수취인오류(blank)")	3:12
2.	"Fireworks" ("불꽃놀이")	4:17
3.	"Whitebird"	4:42
4.	"Rain, Rain, Rain." ("내일은비가내린다. (어제도)")	6:01
5.	"First Snow" ("첫눈")	4:54
6.	"A Giant Step of the Turtle" ("거북이는 발이 무겁다")	4:04
7.	"In Full Bloom" ("벚꽃이 화사했던 계절처럼")	5:39
