= To See the Next Part of the Dream =

Studio album by Parannoul
- Released: 23 February 2021
- Genre: Shoegaze; lo-fi; emo; indie rock
- Length: 61:37
- Language: Korean
- Label: Self-released (Note: While initially self-released, Longinus Recordings sold physical copies of the album and Poclanos released it on streaming services.)
- Producer: Parannoul

Parannoul chronology
Let's Walk on the Path of a Blue Cat (2020)	To See the Next Part of the Dream (2021)	Downfall of the Neon Youth (2021)

To See the Next Part of the Dream is the second studio album by the South Korean musician Parannoul, released independently on 23 February 2021, and later that same year through Longinus Recordings and Poclanos. Parannoul, an anonymous artist of whom little information is known, recorded the album over several years in his bedroom using very limited equipment.

To See the Next Part of the Dream has been variously characterized as a shoegaze, lo-fi, emo, and indie rock record. All instruments are virtual and the volume of most songs usually reaches clipping levels. The lyrics relate to Parannoul's depression and struggles, and the record contains references to 2000s culture, especially Japanese media.

Following its release, To See the Next Part of the Dream gained popularity on the Internet and garnered a cult following. It was critically acclaimed and was considered one of the best albums of 2021 by music publications.

== Background and production ==
Parannoul (Korean: 파란노을; lit. 'blue sunset') is a solo project by an anonymous man from Seoul, South Korea. According to him, no one in real life knows he produces music. In an interview, he said: "[i]f my acquaintance listens to my song[s], I might commit suicide because of embarrassment"; with Pitchfork, he said he was too shy to reveal information about himself or even tell his parents that he makes music. As such, little about him is known.

In the text accompanying To See the Next Part of the Dream's release on Bandcamp, Parannoul described himself as "just a student in [his] bedroom". Between 2017 and 2019, he released multiple albums under the alias laststar. In 2020, he released his debut studio album as Parannoul, Let's Walk on the Path of a Blue Cat. To See the Next Part of the Dream took several years to complete. It was recorded and produced with a single old computer in Parannoul's bedroom using an old digital audio workstation. The vocals were recorded on a Samsung Galaxy S5.

== Composition ==
To See the Next Part of the Dream has been characterized as shoegaze, (Note: Attributed to multiple references:) lo-fi, indie rock, and emo. Sources also described it as a blend between shoegaze, (Note: Attributed to multiple references:) emo (Note: Attributed to multiple references:) (including midwest emo and emo pop), and bedroom pop. (Note: Attributed to multiple references:) Although Parannoul didn't intend for the record to be emo, it naturally became so due to him becoming emotional during the recording process. Ian Cohen of Pitchfork felt some of tracks contained elements of house music, twee punk, and krautrock, while IZM's Kim Seong-wook wrote that the album embraces post-rock and emocore. Eli Enis of Stereogum said that the album "unleash[es] a downpour of lo-fi shoegaze" and, in retrospect, compared its low-quality computerized sound to the "artificial rumble" present in songs by Jane Remover, quannnic, and flyingfish. Arielle Gordon wrote to the same magazine that, while the album feels out of touch with contemporary rock, it's not "passé" but rather evoking of "the nostalgic innocence of early '00s emo". Parannoul cited Weatherday's Come In (2019) as his main influence for the album, and he was also heavily influenced by Sister's Barbershop. Pitchfork's Jillian Mapes found the album inspired by M83's Dead Cities, Red Seas & Lost Ghosts (2003).

To See the Next Part of the Dream goes from soft MIDI keys to "fuzzed, crunchy guitars" that Grant Sharples of Consequence of Sound compared to the sound of Slowdive, Ride, and My Bloody Valentine. Cohen felt the guitars are "either coppery acoustics or saturated fuzz, with nothing in between." The album contains other instruments such as synthesizers, pianos, xylophones, and violins; Parannoul wanted to make the album feel more dynamic and different from other shoegaze bands. Almost all instruments in the album are virtual, using the Virtual Studio Technology technology; Parannoul felt his guitar skills were "terrible" and that he could replicate its sounds using a virtual instrument. Sharples felt that, despite the album's reverb-filled MIDI percussion, default plug-ins, and direct-input guitar, the album sounded "incredibly humanist". Enis said that the album's sound was "caustic and brittle, panoramic and intimate". Paste's Lizzie Manno felt that the record contained "starry-eyed", dense soundscapes, and that it was uncommon for "songs [to burst] with that much rawness and life". Joon Hwan Jang of IZM noted that the album actively incorporated "heightened fuzz effects [and] raw sound resulting from poor recording conditions". Most of the album has its volume at clipping levels, something Parannoul did on purpose, inspired by Still (2014), an album by Nouns. The vocals are mixed low, with the instrumental overpowering it; Parannoul "pulled back" the vocals as he felt this was a typical feature of shoegaze.

"Beautiful World"
A sample of "Beautiful World". Cohen felt that the lyrics in this sample exemplified the album's melodramatic approach. Jang compared its sound to My Bloody Valentine's "Only Shallow".

To See the Next Part of the Dream was influenced by Parannoul's depression, personal struggle, and rock star dreams; he wrote the lyrics at "the darkest time in [his] life", and music was his way to overcome that. Jang noted that Parannoul's lyrics are highly pessimistic and uses self-deprecating language. However, Parannoul feels that, as his mood changed during the album's production, depression-marked lyrics are present along with hopeful ones. He described it as a concept album with a story about "the future of an adult who only dreams about the past while denying reality". It is full of contradictions: "longing for the nostalgia that doesn't exist, denying reality while living in reality, and wanting to love oneself while hating oneself"; Parannoul also lived through these experiences. Depending on the listener's interpretation, the album's ending can be seen as the narrator's suicide or as the narrator succeeding in moving on to reality. Cohen felt that the lyrics expressed that the future or the present doesn't have happiness, and the only feeling that remains is of bittersweetness regarding memories of the youth. Alternatively, Jang noted it addresses themes of inadequacy and the "embarrassing memories of youth". Mapes found that the "dread lingering in every moment of beauty" on the album makes it hopeful.

The album contains samples from his "favorite things", including Japanese media; the idea of adding samples was inspired by an album by Bulssazo. It contains themes of nostalgia and references to the culture of the early 2000s, including Welcome to the N.H.K., Goodnight Punpun, and All About Lily Chou-Chou; the latter film impacted Parannoul's youth, and he considers it his favorite film. Its elements are present in To See the Next Part of the Dream in the form of samples and its cover art, which depicts a scene from it. The album's title is a line from Satoshi Fukushima's manga Hoshikuzu Nina.

== Release and response ==
Parannoul self-released To See the Next Part of the Dream via Bandcamp on 23 February 2021 to little attention. It soon developed a cult following, appearing on the front page of Rate Your Music (RYM) and topping the 2021 chart. While Parannoul is Korean, most of his popularity was from other countries. The album also enjoyed popularity on YouTube and Reddit. Sharples wrote that this popularity made Parannoul reach "post-rock spotlight". After finding the album on RYM, Matt Cruz emailed Parannoul and founded Longinus Recordings with him; according to Cruz, "We all know the story of how that seemed to gain an audience at an exponential level." To See the Next Part of the Dream was Longinus' inaugural release, with Cruz selling physical copies of it. On 19 April, Poclanos released the album on streaming services. In response to the album's popularity, Parannoul felt it was overrated. In April 2021, he rejected an interview with Newsis, writing: "Honestly, I felt burdened by becoming known by this album. It felt like my flaws were being exposed to the world." On 23 February 2022, a follow-up extended play titled White Ceiling / Black Dots Wandering Around was released to mark the album's first anniversary, composed of B-sides not included on the initial album and a demo of "White Ceiling".

== Critical reception ==
Professional ratings
Review scores
Source	Rating
Consequence of Sound	B+
IZM	3.5/5 stars
Ondarock	7.0/10
Pitchfork	8.0/10

To See the Next Part of the Dream received critical acclaim. Grant Sharples of Consequence of Sound wrote that the album "is a masterful work in its genre" and "a bona fide Bandcamp gem in every sense of the phrase". He wrote that, while Parannoul imagined his musical influences "living their lives, disappearing from the Internet", this would not be the case with Parannoul considering how compelling the record was. Ian Cohen of Pitchfork described the music as bold and attractive, skillfully capturing the essence of an "uncanny familiar" sound that "feels like a dream", and concluded his review by stating: "If Parannoul aspires solely to be remembered and not to be adored, [he] might not have much of a choice for long".

Chris DeVille of Stereogum said the album was splendid and that it contained "big fuzz, big feelings, and some astonishingly expansive home-recorded rock music". Abby Jones of Consequence of Sound described the album as "emo ... in utopia". Conor Lochrie of Our Culture Mag wrote that "[e]ach resounding instrumental builds to a feverish conclusion, offering the listener catharsis" and an indescribable "hazy dream of a record". Peter Helman wrote to Stereogum that the record has "sheer unmistakable quality" and concluded: "Occasionally redlining into the stratosphere, there's a vulnerable charm to Parannoul's music that's only enhanced by the fuzzy limitations of its homespun origins." Jang said that due to the song's long runtimes, the listener could be fatigued, but concluded that "the mere fact that [Parannoul] created a space where forgotten purity, individual excitement, and thrill can be reminisced upon imbues this unknown artist's created chromatic reverie with undeniable value."

=== Accolades ===
In June 2021, To See the Next Part of the Dream appeared in Stereogum's list of "The 50 Best Albums of 2021 So Far". It later appeared in best albums of the year lists by Stereogum and Our Culture Mag, and in a list of the best rock albums of the year by Pitchfork. IZM considered it one of the ten best Korean pop albums of the year. In 2022, it appeared in Consequence of Sound's list of "The Top 15 Emo Albums of the Last 15 Years".

Publication	List	Rank	Ref.
Consequence of Sound	The Top 15 Emo Albums of the Last 15 Years (2022)	6	
IZM	2021 K-Pop Album of the Year	—N/a	
Pitchfork	The 31 Best Rock Albums of 2021	—N/a	
Our Culture Mag	The 50 Best Albums of 2021	41	
Stereogum	The 50 Best Albums of 2021 So Far (June)	49	
Stereogum	The 50 Best Albums of 2021	30	

== Track listing ==
All tracks are written by Parannoul.

To See the Next Part of the Dream track listing
No.	Title	Length
1.	"Beautiful World" (아름다운 세상; Areumdaun sesang)	5:20
2.	"Excuse" (변명; Byeonmyeong)	5:51
3.	"Analog Sentimentalism" (아날로그 센티멘탈리즘; Anallogeu sentimentallijeum)	4:24
4.	"White Ceiling" (흰천장; Huincheonjang)	10:00
5.	"To See the Next Part of the Dream"	5:07
6.	"Age of Fluctuation" (격변의 시대; Gyeokbyeonui sidae)	9:20
7.	"Youth Rebellion" (청춘반란; Cheongchunbanran)	7:00
8.	"Extra Story" (엑스트라 일대기; Ekseuteura il-daegi)	2:59
9.	"Chicken"	6:00
10.	"I Can Feel My Heart Touching You"	5:36
Total length:		61:37
