= That's That =

2006 single by Snoop Dogg featuring R. Kelly

Single by Snoop Dogg featuring R. Kelly

from the album Tha Blue Carpet Treatment
- B-side: "Crazy"
- Released: October 10, 2006
- Recorded: 2005–2006
- Genre: West Coast hip hop; R&B
- Length: 4:17
- Label: Geffen; Doggystyle
- Songwriters: Stanley Benton; Calvin Broadus; Tracy Curry; Robert Kelly
- Producers: Nottz; Dr. Dre

Snoop Dogg singles chronology
"I Wanna Fuck You" (2006)	"That's That" (2006)	"Hollywood Divorce" (2006)

R. Kelly singles chronology
"Burn It Up" (2005)	"That's That" (2006)	"Go Getta" (2007)

Music video
- "That's That Ft. R. Kelly" on YouTube

"That's That" (a euphemistic form of the title "That's That Shit") is the second single by Snoop Dogg from the album Tha Blue Carpet Treatment. The song was the first single taken from the album in the UK; however, the single only achieved notable success in the U.S., where it reached #20 on the Billboard Hot 100 chart. The song samples the melody played in the 1988 film Coming to America during the bathroom scene in which Eddie Murphy gets washed by female servants.

== Background ==
Snoop Dogg spoke to AllHipHop.com about the track off Tha Blue Carpet Treatment which Dr. Dre produced and features R. Kelly. Snoop explained "Dr. Dre called me today. We’ve been working on my record. He helped me fix this song I did with R. Kelly. It was a hit record before I gave it Dre, but now it’s a super hit record. He made me strike all my vocals. That means, 'Take all your lyrics off, I don’t like ‘em. They’re wack.' I even go through that shit too. To this day, you know what I mean? I ain’t too big to take criticism. He made me take all my lyrics off and me and D.O.C. had to come up with some more shit that was just extraordinary." The title comes from Kelly repeatedly saying "That's that shit!" in the song.

The song was performed live at the MTV Europe Music Awards 2006, although Kelly wasn't present. The curiosity of the live act was that the intro of the song was the same cut as in the movie with the Victoria Dillard skit at the end, which was left unedited in the direct broadcast, though in the later reruns of the program, "penis" was censored. Though Kelly wasn't present here either, the song was also performed live at the 2006 BET Hip Hop Awards and at the 2006 American Music Awards. Kelly's part was playback in the events.

The song samples a skit from the Coming to America score, which Dr. Dre helped to mix into a single. However he worked on the original movie as well, as he provided the track "Comin' Correct" by J.J. Fad for the soundtrack. He was credited the producer.

== Music video ==
The video premiered on MTV Tuesday, November 7 at 3:30pm EST on TRL. The album version differs from the video/single in its intro, whereas the lyrics includes the movie intro (see below), and R. Kelly answering "Thank you". The clean version has the title shortened to exclude profanity, and has R. Kelly's final solo hook its "sex" word taken out.

== US 12"-vinyl track listing ==
A1 That's That (Radio) (4:17)

- Vocals [Featuring] - R. Kelly

A2 That's That (LP) (4:17)

- Vocals [Featuring] - R. Kelly

A3 That's That (Instrumental) (4:17)

B1 Crazy (Radio) (4:31)

- Vocals [Featuring] - Nate Dogg

B2 Crazy (LP) (4:32)

- Vocals [Featuring] - Nate Dogg

B3 Crazy (Instrumental) (4:31)

== Remixes ==
A remix with Nas was presented on DubCNN where Nas changes the chorus and raps "Nas-is-back" instead of the original one. He also adds a new verse where a lady says "The royal penis is clean your highness" with Snoop responding "Thank You" in place of Kelly in the intro, which is from Coming To America. Another remix features D-Block's Sheek Louch.

== Remakes ==
- Slim Thug & Boss Hogg Outlawz made a remake called "That Click" presented in the mixtape DJ 31 Degreez - The Forecast 3
- Melanie of Redman's label Gilla House, made a remake of it on Redman's mixtape Live From The Bricks called "R&B Smoke Break".

== Personnel ==
- Written by C.Broadus, R. Kelly, D. Lamb, N. Rodgers, S. Benton, T. Curry
- Produced by Nottz for DMP/Teamsta Entertainment
- Additional Production by Dr. Dre
- Publishers: My Own Chit Publishing/EMI Blackwood Music (BMI); Zomba Songs/R. Kelly Publishing (adm. by Zomba Songs) (BMI); DMP/Teamsta Entertainment Music (BMI); Ensign Music LLC (BMI); YEL-NATS (BMI); Almo Music Corp.(ASCAP)
- Recorded by Chris Jackson at The Cathedral, Hollywood, CA
- Recorded by Abel Garibaldi and Ian Mereness at The Chocolate Factory, Chicago, IL
- Assisted by Jeff Meeks
- Recorded by Mauricio "Veto" Iragorri at Record One Studios, Sherman Oaks, Ca
- Assisted by Robert "Roomio" Reyes / Mixed by Dr.Dre at Record One Studios, Sherman Oaks, CA
- Mix engineer: Mauricio "Veto" Iragorri at Record One Studios, Sherman Oaks, CA
- Vocal performance used courtesy of Victoria Dillard
- Contains elements from "The Bath" written by Nile Rodgers and published by Ensign Music LLC (BMI) performed by Nile Rodgers from the motion picture Coming To America courtesy of Paramount Pictures / "Coming To America" courtesy of Paramount Pictures.
- Video shooting location : Chicago
- Directed by Benny Boom
- 1st AD : Joe Osborne

=== B-Side ===
- Written by C. Broadus, F. Nassar, N. Hele
- Produced by "Fredwreck" Farid Nassar for Doggy Style Productions
- Publishers: My Own Chit Publishing/EMI Blackwood Music (BMI); Karam's Kid
- Songs (ASCAP); Nate Dogg Music (BMI) adm. by Reach Global
- Moog, Rhodes, piano, guitars, strings, & ARP by Fredwreck
- Bongos by Erik Coomes
- Recorded by Fredwreck at Palace De Nathan, Fred's Treehouse / Snoop's vocals recorded by Chris Jackson at The Cathedral, Hollywood, CA
- Mixed by Richard "Segal" Huredia & Fredwrizzle at Paramount Recording Studios, Hollywood, CA

== Charts ==
=== Weekly charts ===
Weekly chart performance for "That's That"
Chart (2006–2007)	Peak position
Australia (ARIA)	64
Finland (Suomen virallinen lista)	6
France (SNEP)	30
Germany (GfK)	39
Greece (IFPI)	22
Irish Singles Chart	43
New Zealand (Recorded Music NZ)	18
Sweden (Sverigetopplistan)	55
Switzerland (Schweizer Hitparade)	37
Scottish Singles Sales (Official Charts)	44
UK Singles (Official Charts)	38
UK Hip Hop/R&B (Official Charts)	7
US Billboard Hot 100	20
US Hot R&B/Hip-Hop Songs (Billboard)	9
US Hot Rap Songs (Billboard)	3
US Latin Rhythm Airplay (Billboard)	22
US Rhythmic Airplay (Billboard)	7

=== Year-end charts ===
Year-end chart performance for "That's That"
Chart (2007)	Position
US Billboard Hot 100	99
US Hot R&B/Hip-Hop Songs (Billboard)	57

== Certifications ==
Certifications for "That's That"
Region	Certification	Certified units/sales
New Zealand (RMNZ)	Gold	15,000^{‡}
^{‡} Sales+streaming figures based on certification alone.

== Awards and nominations ==
Awards and nominations for "That's That"
Year	Ceremony	Category	Result
2007	MTV Australia Video Music Awards 2007	Best Hip Hop Video	Won

== Media ==
Coming to America (sample)
Music played during the bathroom scene between 04:47-05:14. Additional scenario voice "The royal penis is cleaned, Your Highness!" is done by Victoria Dillard
