= Downfall of the Neon Youth =

Studio album by Parannoul, Asian Glow, and sonhos tomam conta
- Released: 22 October 2021
- Genre: Shoegaze
- Length: 55:10
- Language: English, Korean, Portuguese
- Label: Longinus Recordings

Parannoul chronology
To See the Next Part of the Dream (2021)	Downfall of the Neon Youth (2021)	White Ceiling / Black Dots Wandering Around (2022)

Asian Glow chronology
Cull Ficle (2021)	Downfall of the Neon Youth (2021)	Weatherglow (2022)

sonhos tomam conta chronology
Hypnagogia (2021)	Downfall of the Neon Youth (2021)	Maladaptive Daydreaming (2022)

Downfall of the Neon Youth is a collaborative studio album by shoegaze musicians Parannoul, Asian Glow, and sonhos tomam conta. It was released on 22 October 2021 through Longinus Recordings.

== Reception ==
Chris DeVille of Stereogum wrote that the collaborations "are about as sweeping and ambitious as DIY home recordings can be". A staff member of Sputnikmusic gave it a 3.9/5 review. David Renshaw of The Fader highlighted the song "Colors". Lizzie Manno of Paste included the album in a list of "Great Records You May Have Missed" in 2021.

== Track listing ==
Downfall of the Neon Youth track listing
No.	Title	Artist	Length
1.	"Nails"	Asian Glow	4:28
2.	"Insomnia"	Parannoul	4:40
3.	"todos os sonhos que eu tive"	sonhos tomam conta	6:37
4.	"Phone Ringing on Corridor"	Asian Glow	5:06
5.	"Colors"	Parannoul	8:08
6.	"tons de azul"	sonhos tomam conta	2:43
7.	"One May Be Harming"	Asian Glow	6:41
8.	"vento caminha comigo"	sonhos tomam conta	8:23
9.	"70 Seconds Before Sunrise"	Parannoul	1:10
10.	"Love Migraine"	Parannoul	7:09
Total length:			55:10
