= Brokenteeth =

South Korean shoegaze musician

BrokenTeeth
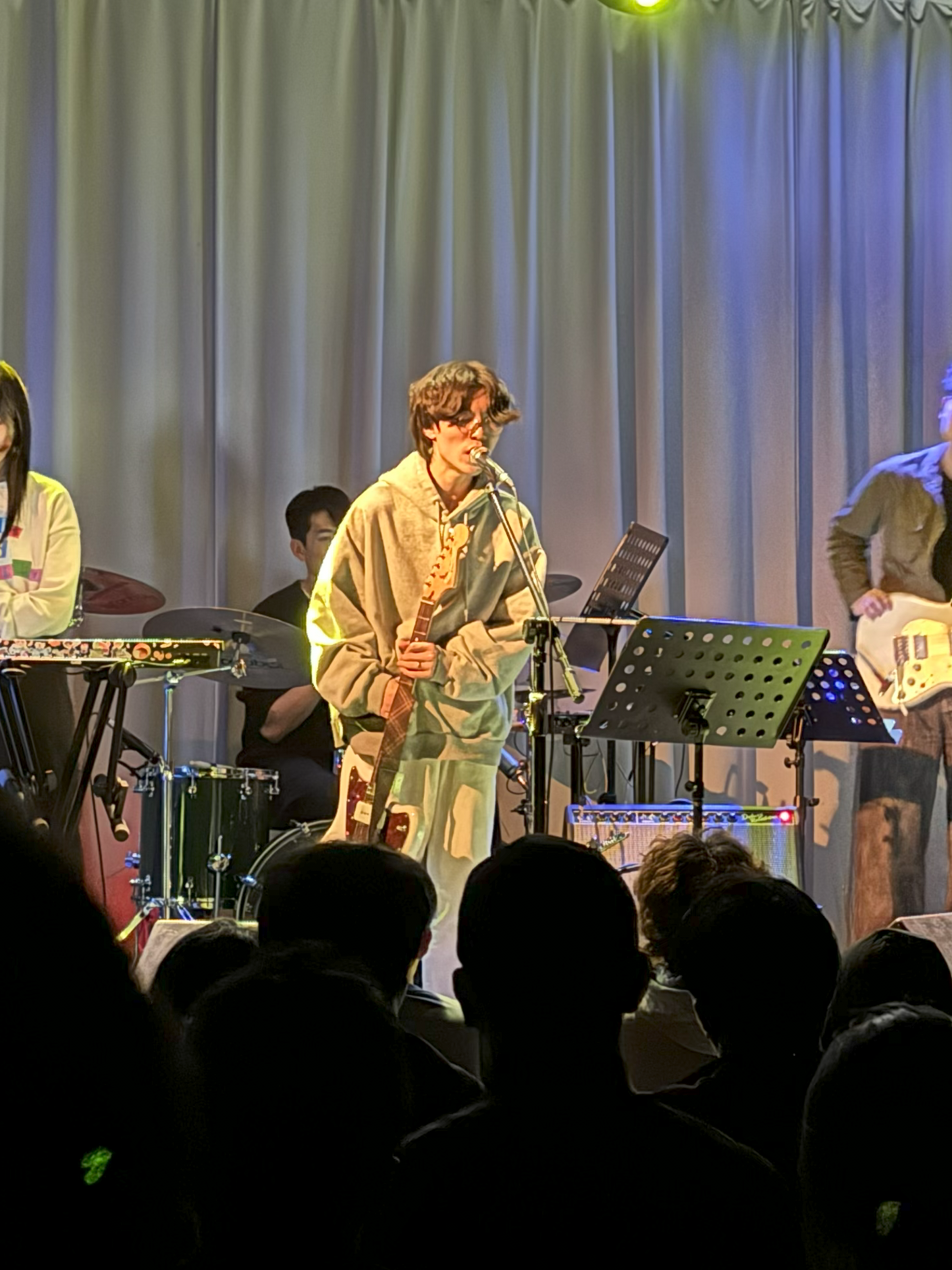
- Brokenteeth in 2023

Background information
- Born: Kim Minha; February 28, 1999 (age 27)
- Origin: Seoul, South Korea
- Genres: Shoegaze, post-rock
- Years active: 2021–present
- Labels: 6v6 Recordings; Poclanos

Kim Minha (Korean: 김민하; born February 28, 1999), better known by his stage name Brokenteeth (stylised BrokenTeeth; Korean: 브로큰티스), is a South Korean shoegaze musician. He has released two albums: The Letters (편지) (2021) and How to Sink Slowly (추락은 천천히) (2023).

== Career ==
BrokenTeeth debuted with his first album, The Letters (편지), in 2021. The album gained popularity when it was released on YouTube.

In February 2022 he released his new single, Paradox (당신의 사랑이 늘 행복하기를). He joined the crew Digital Dawn, which includes Parannoul, Asian Glow, Wapddi, Della Zyr and Fin Fior, and held a concert together in September 2022. He later performed on The EBS space. In December 2022, he released the single Heaven Express (again), which was also featured by Della Zyr.

On February 23, 2023, he released his second studio album, How to Sink Slowly (추락은 천천히). Sunnyvale of Sputnikmusic described the album as "No matter how beautiful a given moment gets, there remains a sort of ambivalence about the proceedings." Music Y's Yoo Seongeun reviewed the track 138 of the album and said, "He conveys the beauty of the shoegaze genre, which has not changed over the years since its previous release of demos."

In August 2023, he did a concert with Byul.org, and he supported Parannoul's After the Night concert.

== Discography ==
=== Studio albums ===
- The Letters (편지) (2021)
- How to Sink Slowly (추락은 천천히) (2023)

=== Live albums ===
- Broken Dental Clinic (수상한 치과) (2023)

=== Singles ===
- Paradox (당신의 사랑이 늘 행복하기를) (2022)
- Spring (2022)
- Heaven Express(again) (2022)
- Once in a Green Moon (2023)
