= Weatherday =

Swedish lo-fi artist

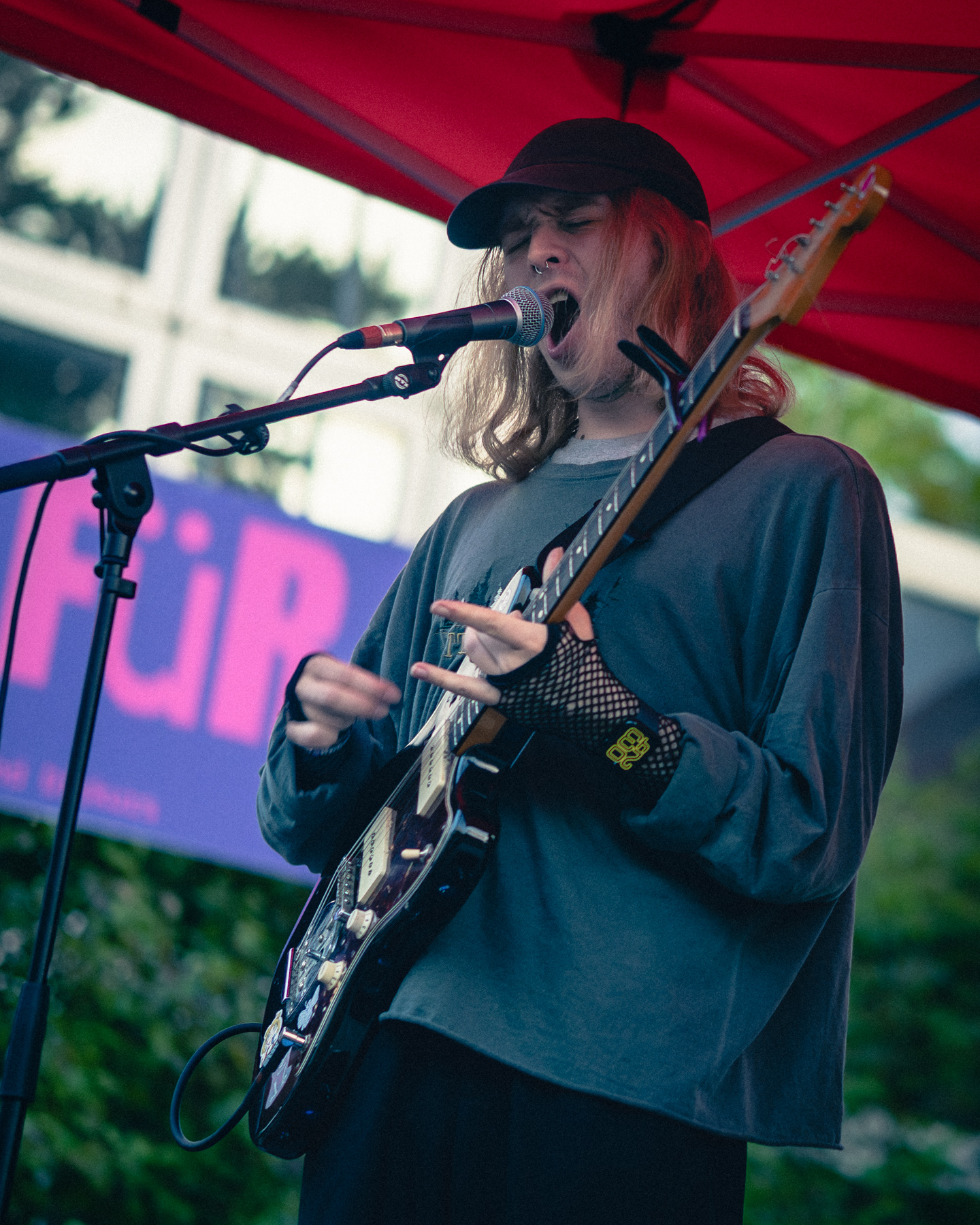
- Sputnik performing live in Vienna in 2025

Background information
- Also known as: Sputnik; Lola's Pocket PC; Rana Plastic Bubbles; Five Pebbles
- Origin: Sweden
- Genres: Emo; noise pop; lo-fi; electronic; shoegaze
- Years active: 2019–present
- Label: Topshelf

Sputnik is the alias of a Swedish lo-fi musician who has been involved in numerous solo projects, most notably, Weatherday. They have also released music under the aliases Five Pebbles, Lola's Pocket PC, and Rana Plastic Bubbles.

== History ==
Sputnik started attempting music production around 2015 before releasing their debut album, Come In, on Bandcamp in 2019, under the name Weatherday. After gaining underground popularity, the album was re-released on Topshelf Records. On 19 March 2025, the second album by Weatherday, Hornet Disaster, was released via Topshelf Records.

== Personal life ==
Sputnik reveals little about their personal life on social media or in interviews. They are non-binary and attracted to all genders.

== Discography ==
=== Albums ===
- Come In (2019)
- Hornet Disaster (2025)

=== EPs ===
- Lola's Pocket PC (2019; as Lola's Pocket PC)
- We Will Always Have (2019; as Lola's Pocket PC)
- forgetmenot (2021; as Five Pebbles)
- Kraków Angels (2021; as Rana Plastic Bubbles)
- Weatherglow (2022), with Asian Glow
- Edema Ruh (2022)
- Always Tangerine (2023; as Rana Plastic Bubbles)
- the loudest and brightest thing (2025)

=== Singles ===
- Only Us and Linger On (2018)
- All the Hand-Made Gifts We Planned to Make (2019; as Lola's Pocket PC)
- But We Get By (2019; as Rana Plastic Bubbles)
- Take the Opportunity (2020; as Rana Plastic Bubbles)
