= Imaginary (exhibition) =

Mathematics communication exhibition

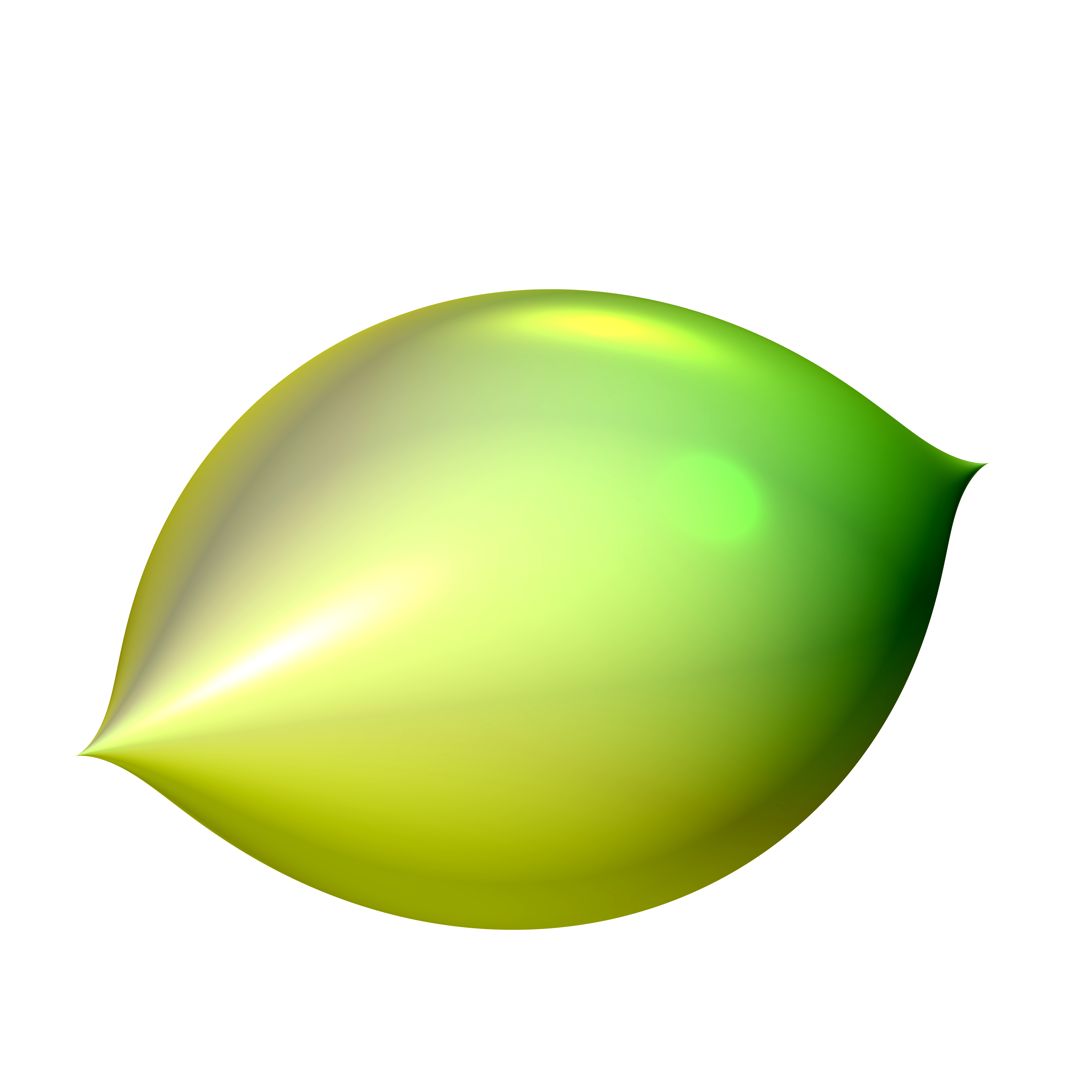
Title image of the exhibition: Citric by Herwig Hauser

IMAGINARY is an open platform dedicated to the communication of modern mathematics. With over 100 different exhibits, software, films, texts, and images for free use and editing, IMAGINARY connects users from over 50 countries. Science museums such as the German Museum in Munich or the Museum of Mathematics (MoMath) in New York have some of the exhibits in their collections. IMAGINARY also acted as an independent organizer of exhibitions.

== History ==
IMAGINARY was founded at the Mathematisches Forschungsinstitut Oberwolfach (MFO) in 2007 by Gert-Martin Greuel and Andreas Matt with an exhibition of the same name, supported by Klaus Tschira Foundation.

In 2013 Gert-Martin Greuel and Andreas Matt received the Media Prize Mathematics of the German Mathematicians Association for IMAGINARY.

From 2019 to 2019, IMAGINARY was funded by the Leibniz Association as an impetus to found a non-profit organisation. Since September 2017, IMAGINARY has been independent with an office in Berlin and regional representatives in numerous countries such as Spain, Uruguay, France, Turkey, South Korea, and China.

== Exhibitions ==
=== IMAGINARY - Through the eyes of mathematics 2007 ===
The IMAGINARY exhibition aimed to convey abstract mathematics through images and visualizations. In the Surfer exhibit, a real-time ray tracer for generating algebraic surfaces, users can enter and edit polynomial equations with three variables, as well as rotate and color the resulting surfaces. Together with the science magazine Spectrum, a competition was created at the MFO to promote the creation of artistic images made in Surfer.

=== MPE - Mathematics of Planet Earth ===
As part of the theme year “Mathematics of Planet Earth”, announced by UNESCO, the International Science Council ICSU and the International Council for Applied Mathematics ICIAM, IMAGINARY organized a competition on the topic. The best submissions were part of an exhibition in the German Museum of Technology in Berlin. These included an interactive simulation from the University of Freiburg that calculates the movements of ash clouds, and an exhibit from the Free University of Berlin that introduces the scientific prognosis of glacier changes.

=== La La Lab - The Mathematics of Music ===
The La La Lab exhibition was opened in 2019 in cooperation with the Heidelberg Laureate Forum Foundation in the Mathematik-Informatik-Station (MAINS) and communicates the research results from mathematics and music. The 20 interactive stations include, among others, an exhibit using a 3D printer, art objects, laser installation.

=== I AM A.I. 2020/2021 ===
The I.AM.AI exhibition was created in 2020 with the financial support of the Carl Zeiss Foundation with the aim of communicating current AI research to a general audience. Due to the corona pandemic, I.AM.AI initially celebrated its launch as a virtual exhibition. The physical exhibition has been postponed to the year 2021 and will visit three venues with the Friedrich Schiller University Jena, the Heidelberg Laureate Forum, and a not yet announced location in Kaiserslautern.

== Exhibition venues of the original IMAGINARY exhibition ==
A complete list of the exhibitions, past, current and future, can be found on the official website.

Date	City	Venue
21.09.2010 - 07.10.2010	Zurich, Switzerland	ETH Zurich
08.03.2010 - 17.03.2010	Cambridge, UK	Isaac Newton Institute for Mathematical Sciences
19.01.2010 - 26.02.2010	Hannover, Germany	Leibniz University Hannover
05.11.2009 - 15.11.2009	Kyiv, Ukraine	Museum für Russische Kunst
14.12.2008 - 31.12.2009	Second Life, Internet	Second Life Kunstgalerie
09.10.2009	Vienna, Austria	Museumsquartier
30.09.2009 - 20.10.2009	Münster, Deutschland	Stadthaus III
26.09.2009	Bonn, Germany	Hausdorff Center for Mathematics
24.03.2009 - 09.05.2009	Dresden, Germany	Helmholtz-Zentrum Dresden-Rossendorf
27.04.2009 - 01.05.2009	Stanford, United States	Stanford University
23.03.2009 - 19.04.2009	Berkeley, United States	MSRI
02.03.2009 - 20.03.2009	Vienna, Austria	University of Vienna
05.12 - 19.12.2008	Passau, Germany	University of Passau
24.10 - 16.11.2008	Saarbrücken, Germany	k4 galerie
01.10. - 19.10.2008	Konstanz, Germany	Stadtturm
25.09. - 21.10.2008	Munich, Germany	LMU Munich
08.09. - 26.09.2008	Köln, Germany	Mensa, University of Cologne
07.05. - 04.09.2008	Diverse Städte, Germany	Wissenschaftsschiff
05.08 - 29.08.2008	Kassel, Germany	Stadtsparkasse
08.07. - 30.07.2008	Rust, Germany	Science House
28.06. - 04.07.2008	Leipzig, Germany	Wissenschaftssommer
29.05. - 25.06.2008	Potsdam, Germany	Bahnhof
17.05. - 25.05.2008	Stuttgart, Germany	Ideenpark, Messe
10.03. - 11.04.2008	Kaiserslautern, Germany	Fraunhofer ITWM
19.02. - 06.03.2008	Berlin, Germany	Urania
28.01. - 05.02.2008	Berlin, Germany	Lichthof, Technische Universität Berlin
23.01.2008	Berlin, Germany	Telekomzentrale
10.12.2007 - 18.01.2008	Munich, Germany	Technical University of Munich

== Other projects and cooperations ==
- since 2010 MiMa - Museum for Minerals and Mathematics
- since 2014 Mathematics Communication Network
- 2015 Snapshots of Mathematics
- 2015 - 2019 Hilbert
- 2016 Mathematikon
- 2016 - 2017 MathCreations
- 2016 - 2019 Holo-Math
- 2017 - 2019 TROP ICSU
- 2018 Science Spaces
- 2018 STEAM HUB
- 2018 Imaginary, Conference IC18
- 2018 - 2021 Mathina
- since 2018 Women of Mathematics throughout Europe
- since 2020 UNESCO International Day of Mathematics
