= Imagine (Mort Shuman album) =

Studio album by Mort Shuman
- Released: 1976
- Genre: Chanson
- Label: Philips Records/ Phonogram/ Polygram.

Imagine is a 1976 French-language chanson album by Mort Shuman with band conducted by Hervé Roy. The album earned a gold record in France. Three singles were released from the album; "Sorrow" (B: "Botany Bay"), "Save The Last Dance For Me (B: "Papa-Tango-Charly") and "Imagine" (B: "Dansons").

== Track listing ==
A-side

1. Imagine – music Shuman lyrics Moro
2. Papa-Tango-Charly (Le Triangle Des Bermudes) – lyrics Philippe Adler
3. A Chaque Coeur Sa Raison
4. Sorrow

B-side

1. Save The Last Dance For Me – lyrics André Salvet, François Llenas
2. Le Vieux Broadway
3. Dansons – E. L. Moro, M. Shuman
4. Devant Ton Berceau
5. La Vieille Demoiselle
