= Rate Your Music =

Online music and film cataloging website

- Website type: Social cataloging website and online community
- Available in: English (main site); Dutch, Finnish, French, German, Greek, Italian, Polish, Portuguese, Russian, Spanish (forums)
- Founder: Hossein Sharifi
- Website: rateyourmusic.com; rym.fm (forums)
- Commercial: Yes
- Registration: Optional; required for cataloging, rating, reviewing, and forum participation
- Users: 1.6 million registered accounts (August 2026)
- Launched: December 24, 2000; 25 years ago
- Current status: Active

Rate Your Music (often abbreviated as RYM) is a social cataloging website for music releases and films. Users can catalog, tag, rate, and review entries; ratings are submitted on a five-star scale and aggregated into community-based charts. Founded by Hossein Sharifi on December 24, 2000, Rate Your Music initially focused on music and began adding films to its database in 2009.

The site has been discussed by music writers as a discovery and cataloging resource, and its charts and user community have been associated with the online popularity of some artists and albums.

== History ==
Rate Your Music was founded by Hossein Sharifi on December 24, 2000. The original site centered on user ratings, reviews, and cataloging of music releases. Later coverage highlighted other community features, including user-created lists and forum discussions. Mahalo described the original "RYM 1.0" interface as remaining visually unchanged until August 2006, when "RYM 2.0" introduced a redesigned interface and additional functionality.

In May 2009, Rate Your Music began adding films to its database.

In 2015, Rate Your Music announced plans for a redesigned version called Sonemic, alongside sister projects for films and video games, Cinemos and Glitchwave. Contemporary coverage described the redesign as intended to modernize the site's interface, expand its recommendation features, and preserve existing ratings and statistics. The project was the subject of an Indiegogo crowdfunding campaign.

In November 2020, Sonemic, Inc. stated that it would integrate Sonemic features into Rate Your Music itself rather than launch Sonemic as a separate replacement site. As of August 2026, the Sonemic project remained in progress, with several features already incorporated into Rate Your Music and further catalog, list, messaging, profile, and API work still listed as planned or in progress.

== Features ==
Rate Your Music is a social cataloging website where users can catalog, tag, rate, and review music. Users can create pages for new releases, vote on genre tags, and navigate a taxonomy of genres and subgenres. The site's rating system uses a five-star scale; users may assign ratings in half-star increments from 0.5 to 5.0 stars.

Rate Your Music's charts aggregate user ratings and can be searched by year or genre. The site also includes user-created lists and discussion forums. Its genre entries are edited by users, cite outside sources, and are approved by moderators.

== Statistics ==
As of August 2026, Sonemic reported that Rate Your Music had over 1.6 million registered accounts, 7.4 million releases, 27.8 million songs, 176 million ratings, and 3.8 million reviews.

As of August 2026, the site listed over 1.6 million user-created lists.

== Impact ==
Music writers have described Rate Your Music as one of several online communities involved in the rediscovery or internet popularity of some artists and albums. In 2019, Kerrang! wrote that Have a Nice Life's 2008 album Deathconsciousness became a "viral hit" among internet communities including /mu/, Sputnikmusic, and Rate Your Music. The Ringer wrote the same year that Duster's cult following grew in online spaces including Rate Your Music, message boards, Reddit, and YouTube comments, while Vice described the band's legacy as reaching listeners through Soulseek and Rate Your Music genre lists.

Pitchfork wrote in 2024 that Parannoul's 2021 album To See the Next Part of the Dream made him "internet-famous", and described Rate Your Music as the online community that initially championed Parannoul and Asian Glow.

Bandcamp Daily reported in 2022 that Chat Pile's self-released debut EP reached the top of Rate Your Music's weekly charts due to a timing fluke, giving the band a "receptive base of music nerds"; guitarist Luther Manhole said the band's popularity on RYM had contributed to its career.

== Reception ==
Commentary about Rate Your Music has often focused on its value as a music-discovery and cataloging resource, as well as its dense or dated interface. In a 2011 comparison of Spotify and Rdio, Wired writer Andy Baio used Rate Your Music's top 5,000 albums as a dataset and described the site as a "quirky 11-year-old online community dedicated to rating and reviewing music". In 2015, Hypebot published a guest article by Peter Getty that included Rate Your Music among useful music-discovery tools, describing its community as multilingual and collection-focused. Writing for M.O.V.I.N [UP] the same year, Maurício Angelo praised the site's archive, lists, classifications, maps, and release guide, while saying that it was not an example of strong layout or usability. Radio Wave's Karel Veselý described Rate Your Music and Discogs as cult music portals with large online communities, and noted that Rate Your Music users especially valued its genre-, subgenre-, format-, country-, and year-based charts.

The Daily Star's Deeparghya Dutta Barua similarly described Rate Your Music as a site that favored "functionality over aesthetics", highlighting its database, user-curated lists, and configurable charts.

In February 2023, NME and Consequence reported that Kendrick Lamar's 2015 album To Pimp a Butterfly had overtaken Radiohead's 1997 album OK Computer as the highest-rated album on Rate Your Music. Consequence described Rate Your Music as a "popular community review site" and contrasted its community-based ratings with sites such as Metacritic.

== See also ==
- List of online music databases
