= Imagen =

Imagen may refer to:

- Imagen (text-to-image model), a text-to-image machine learning model
- Imagen (magazine), a Spanish language women's fashion magazine
- Imagen Televisión, a television network
- Imagen Awards
- Grupo Imagen, a Mexican media group
