= Imagine (Snoop Dogg song) =

Song by Snoop Dogg featuring Dr. Dre and D'Angelo

from the album Tha Blue Carpet Treatment
- Released: November 21, 2006
- Genre: Hip hop, G-funk
- Length: 4:42
- Label: Geffen
- Songwriter(s): Calvin Broadus, Andre Young, Mark Batson
- Producer(s): Dr. Dre, Mark Batson

"Imagine" is a song by American rapper Snoop Dogg, featuring guest vocals from rapper Dr. Dre and singer D'Angelo, taken from Snoop Dogg's eighth studio album Tha Blue Carpet Treatment (2006). The song was written by Snoop Dogg, Dr. Dre and Mark Batson, with production handled by Dr. Dre and Mark Batson.

== Background ==
Originally, the track "Imagine" was slated to be on Busta Rhymes' The Big Bang album. Busta Rhymes stated in several interviews, shortly before The Big Bang's release, that the sample for "Imagine" was still trying to be cleared. Busta Rhymes stated that he was not sure that the sample would be cleared in time for his album's release, so it had to be excluded from his album. The sample was not cleared in time, and it is presumable that the song was given to Snoop Dogg for his album soon after. It was then recorded with verses by Kam and Snoop Dogg (different from the album version) that was played on the TBCT Listening party. Although Busta Rhymes later released a remix to the song, it is presumable that his "remix" is actually the intended original version that did not make the release of The Big Bang. Moreover, artists like Nas, Ja Rule and Black-Ty also did freestyles to the song. He also confirmed that Dr. Dre had a big input on this album, producing several tracks and even rapping a verse on the track, "Imagine". Dr. Dre hadn't produced any Snoop Dogg tracks since 2000.

== Lyrics ==
The track was written by Snoop Dogg, Dr. Dre and Mark Batson, and was performed by Snoop Dogg, Dr. Dre, and D'Angelo who did the chorus. In the song, Snoop Dogg and Dr. Dre are trying to encourage the listener to imagine a world without hip-hop. They are providing examples of things that would have not been possible if hip-hop had not been invented. Dr. Dre mentions that both Tupac and The Notorious B.I.G. would have not been killed if they had not been a part of the hip-hop movement.

== Charts ==
Chart (2006)	Peak position
US Bubbling Under R&B/Hip-Hop Singles (Billboard)	7
