= After the Magic =

Studio album by Parannoul
- Released: 28 January 2023
- Genre: Shoegaze; indie rock; hyper-rock
- Length: 59:05
- Label: Topshelf
- Producer: Parannoul

Parannoul chronology
Paraglow (2022)	After the Magic (2023)	After The Night (2023)

Singles from After the Magic
- 1. "Insomnia" Released: November 9, 2022; 2. "We Shine at Night" Released: January 11, 2023

After the Magic is the third studio album by the South Korean shoegaze musician Parannoul. It was released on January 28, 2023, through Topshelf Records, making it his first album not to be self-released. The album was preceded by two singles: "Insomnia" on November 9, 2022, and "We Shine at Night" on January 11, 2023.

Parannoul described the album as "not what you expected, but what I always wanted", and stated it was inspired by dreams he had after finishing his previous album, To See the Next Part of the Dream.

== Critical reception ==
Professional ratings
Review scores
Source	Rating
AllMusic	4/5 stars
Ondarock	7.5/10
Pitchfork	8.4/10
Spectrum Culture	80%
Sputnikmusic	4.2/5

Upon its release, After the Magic was generally well received by music critics. Reviewing the album for AllMusic, Paul Simpson described it as "Parannoul's breakthrough moment, featuring their most memorable songwriting to date as well as their most stunning arrangements. Not quite as overtly emo-influenced as previous releases, After the Magic draws more from chiming, melodic '90s alt-rock, adding electronic flourishes such as glitches and subtle breakbeats, and even approaching chamber pop." Ian Cohen for Pitchfork rated the album an 8.4/10 and awarded it the "Best New Music" distinction, writing: "It's an album that might make one hour of our lives so powerful that we spend the rest of our days trying to remember it." Fader included "We Shine at Night" in a list of "The 20 Best Rock Songs Right Now".

== Track listing ==
All tracks are written by Parannoul and produced by Parannoul and eeajik.

After the Magic track listing
No.	Title	Length
1.	"북극성 (Polaris)"	4:22
2.	"불면증 (Insomnia)"	4:49
3.	"도착 (Arrival)"	7:44
4.	"우리는 밤이 되면 빛난다 (We Shine at Night)"	6:27
5.	"Parade"	7:34
6.	"스케치북 (Sketchbook)"	7:02
7.	"Imagination"	4:37
8.	"Sound Inside Me, Waves Inside You"	5:13
9.	"개화 (Blossom)"	6:11
10.	"After the Magic"	5:02
Total length:		59:05

== Personnel ==
Additional musicians

- Della Zyr – vocals
- 은해 – vocals (8)
- Rei from Vampillia – strings, string arrangement
- Fin Fior – trumpet (4, 5, 9)
- Asian Glow – guitar (7)
- eeajik – guitar

Production

- eeajik – producer, mixing, mastering
- Parannoul – producer, mixing, mastering, album cover
- Sarah Alvarez – album cover

== Chart performance ==
In the United States, After the Magic sold 1,000 copies in its first week of release and charted at 76 on Billboard's Top Current Album Sales, Parannoul's first appearance in the charts. Following the album's release, Parannoul charted at 45 on the Emerging Artists chart.

Chart (2023)	Peak position
US Top Current Album Sales (Billboard)	76
