= Parannoul =

South Korean musician (born 2001)

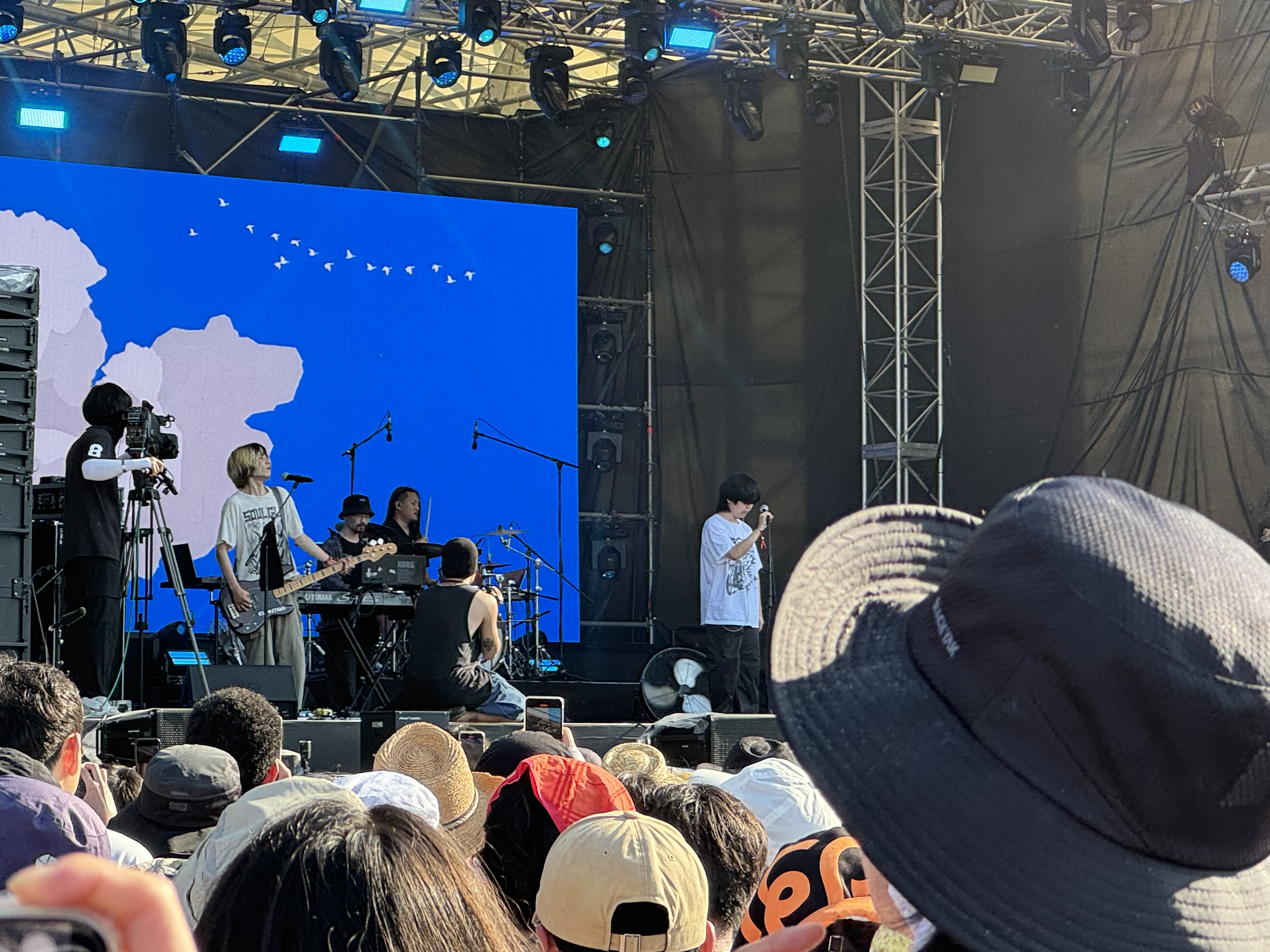
- Parannoul performing at Pentaport Rock Festival 2024

Background information
- Also known as: laststar; Mydreamfever; Huremic
- Born: 2001 (age 24–25)
- Origin: Seoul, South Korea
- Genres: Shoegaze; emo
- Instruments: Vocals; keyboards
- Years active: 2017–present
- Labels: Topshelf; Longinus Recordings; Poclanos

- Parannoul
- Hangul: 파란노을
- RR: Parannoeul
- MR: P'arannoŭl

Parannoul (Korean: 파란노을; lit. 'blue sunset'; born 2001) is a pseudonymous South Korean shoegaze musician. He has released four solo albums: Let's Walk on the Path of a Blue Cat (2020), To See the Next Part of the Dream (2021), After the Magic (2023) and Sky Hundred (2024).

Parannoul has collaborated with other shoegaze musicians like Asian Glow of South Korea and sonhos tomam conta of Brazil, releasing the split album, Downfall of the Neon Youth (2021), and later the Paraglow EP in 2022. In 2024, he worked with the international rap group Fax Gang to make the album Scattersun.

Parannoul has also released music under other pseudonyms, including the ambient and new age Rough and Beautiful Place (2022) as Mydreamfever, as well as several now-deleted albums as laststar. He is one of the most representative musicians in the shoegaze scene, which has emerged as a new trend in the South Korean indie music scene since 2021.

== Career ==
Parannoul released his first and second albums, Let's Walk on the Path of a Blue Cat in 2020 and To See the Next Part of the Dream in 2021, through Bandcamp. He has gained popularity through Bandcamp, Rate Your Music, and Reddit. His second album was reviewed on Pitchfork, Consequence of Sound, and Stereogum. He featured on the split album Downfall of the Neon Youth with Asian Glow and sonhos tomam conta, contributing four tracks, which was released on October 22, 2021.

Parannoul describes himself as "just a student writing music in my bedroom". In an interview with Sonemic, Parannoul stated that the album cover for his album To See the Next Part of the Dream "is actually one of the scenes from リリイ・シュシュのすべて (All About Lily Chou-Chou). It's not an important scene at all, it's just a scene that lasts five seconds...But for some reason, the smokestack and the white smoke made me feel nostalgic. (Actually the whole movie feels that way.) When I first saw the factory with smokestacks, I felt stuffy and uncomfortable, like we won't have freedom inside there. On the other hand, I felt something contradictory when I saw the pure white smoke coming out of it. I wanted to show the clean yet dirty side of youth through this smokestack. The little birds above the smoke show the mind of the teenager that wanted to be free."

On 1 January 2022, Parannoul released Rough and Beautiful Place under the pseudonym Mydreamfever. The release is a departure from the shoegaze style present on his Parannoul works, with the album being described as ambient and new-age. Rough and Beautiful Place was featured as Bandcamp's "Album of the Day" shortly after its release. He joined the crew Digital Dawn, which includes Asian Glow, Brokenteeth, Wapddi, Della Zyr and Fin Fior, and he held his first concert with Digital Dawn in September 2022. His third album under the name Parannoul, After the Magic, was released on January 28, 2023.

Later on Parannoul released Seeking Darkness under the alias Huremic, released on March 13, 2025. The album explores a cinematic post-rock sound, drawing comparisons to Sigur Rós with its slow-building compositions, ambient textures, and emotional depth. Huremic’s use of layered guitars, subtle electronics, and minimal vocals creates an introspective atmosphere throughout the record. Upon release, Seeking Darkness received widespread acclaim on independent music platforms, earning high ratings on Rate Your Music and other music critic sites, where users praised its immersive soundscapes and cohesive mood. On October 29, 2025, he released How I See Nothing But You as a collaborative album by Mydreamfever and Huremic.

== Music ==
Parannoul sings in Korean. His tracks are titled in the English language or else are offered in Korean, as Hangul with English translation.

== Discography ==
=== Released under laststar ===
Albums

- In the Purest Sense (2017)
- Winter Rain, Winter Rain (2018)
- Strange Days (2018)
- 꽃샘추위 (Recurrence) (2018)
- Sleepless (2018)
- Tomorrow's They And I (2018)
- Egoletter (2018)
- Our Last Summer (2018)
- In the City Made Of Echoes (2018)
- Introvert Love Connection (2018)
- Behind the Shadow (2019)
- Covers +1 (2019)
- Stars Whisper to Me Tonight (2019)

EPs

- 기억일기 (Memory Diary) (2017)

=== Released under Parannoul ===
Albums

- Let's Walk on the Path of a Blue Cat (2020)
- To See the Next Part of the Dream (2021)
- After the Magic (2023)
- Sky Hundred (2024)

Live albums

- After the Night (2023)

EPs

- White Ceiling / Black Dots Wandering Around (2022)

Singles

- "Into the Endless Night" (2021)
- "Insomnia" (2022)
- "We Shine at Night" (2023)
- "Acryl" (2023) (Under compilation album "Xtalline : 001")
- "Gold River" (2024)
- "Painless" (2024)

Collaborative albums & EPs

- Downfall of the Neon Youth (2021) (Split album with Asian Glow and sonhos tomam conta)
- Paraglow (2022) (Collaborative EP with Asian Glow)
- Scattersun (2024) (Collaborative album with Fax Gang)

=== Released under Mydreamfever ===
Albums

- Rough and Beautiful Place (2022)
- 1. Silence Is the New Noise (2025)
- 2. Blue Lucent Reverie (2025)
- 3. How I See Nothing But You (2025) (Collaborative album with Huremic)
- 4. Mountain Still Breathing (2026)
- 5. In the Same Light (2026)
- 6. Noise Is the New Silence (2026)

Singles

- Anywhere, Anytime (2021)

=== Released under Huremic ===
Albums

- Seeking Darkness (2025)
- 3. How I See Nothing But You (2025) (Collaborative album with Mydreamfever)

Collaborative albums & EPs

- 祈雨祭 (Guiouejae) (2025) (Split album with Brokenteeth, Fin Fior, Asian Glow, Della Zyr, and Wapddi)

Live Albums

- No Dancing Allowed (2026)
