= Asian Glow =

South Korean rock musician

- Asian Glow at The Vera Project in 2026

Background information
- Born: Shin Gyeongwon; June 14, 2001 (age 25)
- Origin: Seoul, South Korea
- Genres: Slacker rock, emo, shoegaze
- Years active: 2020–present
- Label: Longinus Recordings

Shin Gyeongwon (Korean: 신경원; born June 14, 2001), better known by their stage name Asian Glow (Korean: 아시안 글로우), is a South Korean slacker rock musician. They have released six albums: Nosferadoof (2020), Cull Ficle (2021), Stalled Flutes, Means (2022), Unwired Detour (2024), 11100011 (2025) and "Arin Cot" (2026).

== Career ==
Prior to the solo project, Shin was a member of the shoegaze band FØG, and also made music under various monikers and projects. In 2020, they released their first album Nosferadoof under the stage name Asian Glow, and later gained attention from fans of emo music on YouTube and Reddit.

In 2021, they released their second full-length album, Cull Ficle. Later that year, they released a split album, Downfall Of The Neon Youth with close musicians Parannoul and sonhos tomam conta.

In 2022, they collaborated with Swedish musician Weatherday, releasing the EP Weatherglow. In June, they released their third album Stalled Flutes, Means. In August, they performed alongside Parannoul, Brokenteeth, Wapddi, Della Zyr and Fin Fior at Digital Dawn, a concert that celebrated the burgeoning online Korean indie scene. On September 22, they released Paraglow with Parannoul, and received acclaim from TheNeedleDrop and Pitchfork, with contributor Ian Cohen commenting the release "feels like a true collaboration".

On 1 January 2023, they released the single Dorothee Thines.

On 4 February 2024, alongside the release of their album Unwired Detour, Shin announced the retirement of the Asian Glow stage name, but then in November returned to using it.

On 6 January 2025, they released their newest album 11100011, under the Asian Glow name.

== Discography ==
=== Studio albums ===
- Nosferadoof (2020)
- Cull Ficle (2021)
- Stalled Flutes, Means (2022)
- Unwired Detour (2024)
- 11100011 (2025)
- Arin Cot (2026)

=== EPs ===
- pt.2345678andstill (2021)
- lines between the doorframe (2021)
- Coverglow pt. 1 (2022)

=== Collaborative albums & EPs ===
- Downfall of the Neon Youth (2021) (with Parannoul and sonhos tomam conta)
- Weatherglow (2022) (with Weatherday)
- Paraglow (2022) (with Parannoul)
- Dreamglow (2023) (with sonhos tomam conta)
