= 2006 in music =

This is a list of notable events in music that took place in the year 2006.

== Specific locations ==
- 2006 in British music
- 2006 in Irish music
- 2006 in Norwegian music
- 2006 in Scandinavian music
- 2006 in South Korean music
- 2006 in Swiss music

== Specific genres ==
- 2006 in classical music
- 2006 in country music
- 2006 in heavy metal music
- 2006 in hip-hop
- 2006 in jazz
- 2006 in Latin music
- 2006 in progressive rock
- 2006 in rock music

== Events ==
=== January ===
- January 14 – Eminem remarries ex-wife Kim after five years of separation.
- January 20 – February 5 – The Big Day Out festival takes place in Australia and New Zealand, headlined by The White Stripes, Iggy and the Stooges and Franz Ferdinand. AFI withdraw due to a delay in recording their then-untitled seventh studio album, with Mylo and Jean Grae also withdrawing from the lineup.
- January 31 – American hardcore punk band Champion announced their impending breakup, with a final show scheduled for May.

=== February ===
- February 1
  - Vienna State Opera announces that music director Seiji Ozawa will have to cancel all of his performance commitments for 2006 due to ill-health.
- February 8 – The 48th annual Grammy Awards are handed out at the Staples Center in Los Angeles, USA. Madonna opens the awards for a third time. U2 is the night's big winner, with five awards, becoming the only rock act currently to win two Album of the Year awards with their win for How to Dismantle an Atomic Bomb, following their 1988 win for The Joshua Tree. They also win Song of the Year for "Sometimes You Can't Make It on Your Own", while Green Day's "Boulevard of Broken Dreams" wins Record of the Year. John Legend wins Best New Artist. Mariah Carey won three of her eight nominations, her first Grammys since 1991. Kelly Clarkson is the first American Idol contestant ever to win a Grammy.
- February 18 – The Rolling Stones give a free concert with about 1,3 million people in Rio de Janeiro, Brazil.
- February 22 – The one billionth song is downloaded on iTunes; the song is "Speed of Sound" by Coldplay.
- February 24 – Premiere of The Scarecrow by Joseph Turrin at University of Texas at Austin Performing Arts Center.
- February 25 – The fourth annual Total Request Live awards are held in New York City, USA. Madonna wins the Lifetime Achievement Award and Bono wins the Most Inspired Artist/Humanitarian Award. Other winners include Fall Out Boy, Chris Brown, Mariah Carey, Ashlee Simpson, Kelly Clarkson, Amanda Bynes, and My Chemical Romance. Performers included Ashlee Simpson and Chris Brown.

=== March ===
- March 5
  - Bon Jovi's second single, "Who Says You Can't Go Home", from the album Have A Nice Day goes to number one in the U.S. Hot Country Charts for two weeks. This is the first time a rock band has achieved a number one hit in the US country charts.
  - Three 6 Mafia became the first African American hip-hop group to win an Academy Award for Best Song and also became the first hip-hop artists to ever perform at the ceremony. The group was nominated for the song "It's Hard out Here for a Pimp" from the Hustle & Flow film soundtrack.
- March 11 – James Blunt, with his single "You're Beautiful", becomes the first British artist to top the US Billboard Hot 100 chart since Elton John with "Candle in the Wind 1997" almost nine years earlier.

=== April ===
- April 1–2 – The Festival Imperial is held in the Autódromo La Guácima, in Alajuela, Costa Rica.
- April 5 – Eminem files for divorce from wife Kim, less than three months after they were married for the second time.
- April 11 – Rapper Proof is shot and killed by a nightclub bouncer at 8 Mile Road in Detroit, Michigan, after allegedly shooting a third man, Keith Bender, Jr, who later dies of his injuries.
- April 15 – Mary J. Blige's single "Be Without You" ends its 15th week at number one on the US Billboard R&B chart, making it the most successful R&B song in history.
- April 29–30 – The Coachella Valley Music and Arts Festival takes place in Indio, California, USA. Performers include Madonna, James Blunt, Kanye West, Depeche Mode, Daft Punk, and Paul Oakenfold.

=== May ===
- May 1 – 1,951 guitarists simultaneously play Jimi Hendrix's song "Hey Joe" in the town square of Wrocław, Poland, breaking a Guinness world record.
- May 2 – Pearl Jam release their self-titled album Pearl Jam, their eighth studio album. It was also their first released album after their departure from Sony.
- May 8 – Mor ve Otesi, a Turkish alternative rock band, release Büyük Düşler, their fifth studio album.
- May 9 – Beirut release their debut album, Gulag Orkestar.
- May 20 – Finnish monster rock band Lordi win the Eurovision Song Contest 2006 with the song "Hard Rock Hallelujah", the first hard rock and heavy metal song to win.
- May 21 – Madonna begins her Confessions Tour in Los Angeles, USA. Tickets were sold out within minutes in North America, Europe, and Asia, resulting in new dates to be announced in New York, Los Angeles, Tokyo, and London. The tour grossed more than US$260 million – the highest-grossing tour in history by a female artist.
- May 24 – Taylor Hicks wins the US television talent contest, American Idol, season 5. Katharine McPhee is the runner-up.

=== June ===
- June 1 – YoungbloodZ and their entourage are arrested on drugs and weapons charges in Atlanta, Georgia, USA.
- June 6 – Ice Cube's first album in six years, Laugh Now, Cry Later, is released on his independently owned record label Lench Mob Records. The album debuted in the top five selling 144,000 copies in the first week.
- June 7 – World premiere of Karlheinz Stockhausen's Freude, for two harps, in the Milan Cathedral by Esther Kooi and Marianne Smit.
- June 8 – Shakira's single "Hips Don't Lie" sells 266,500 downloads in its first week of availability, overtaking D4L's record of 175,000. "Hips Don't Lie" also breaks another record, gaining the greatest airplay in a single week with 9,657 plays, breaking Gwen Stefani's "Hollaback Girl" record of 9,582.
- June 9
  - Nelly Furtado's new album, Loose is released and debuts at No. 1 with 219,000 copies sold, making it her first number-one album.
  - Igor Cavalera leaves Sepultura because of artistic differences – the third official member and the second Cavalera to leave.
- June 9–11 – The annual Download Festival takes place at Donington Park in Leicestershire, England. Tool, Metallica and Guns N' Roses headlined the main stage, the Snickers stage by The All-American Rejects, Alter Bridge and The Prodigy, the Gibson/Myspace stage by Ginger & The Sonic Circus, Killing Joke and Sick of It All, and the Snickers Bowl stage by Gay for Johnny Depp, Get Cape. Wear Cape. Fly and Viking Skull.
- June 14 – Shakira launches her Oral Fixation Tour in Zaragoza, Spain.
- June 16–18 – Bonnaroo Music Festival takes place in Manchester, Tennessee, USA. Performers include Radiohead, Tom Petty, Phil Lesh and Friends, Beck, and Sasha.
- June 19 – Taylor Swift released her first single, "Tim McGraw", at 16 years old.
- June 23 – Backstreet Boys band member Kevin Richardson leaves the group to pursue other interests. However, he would return to the group permanently on April 29, 2012.

=== July ===
- July 1 – Glue Gun performed their first reunion concert at Harpers in Northridge, Los Angeles, California, USA. It was the band's first performance since breaking up in 1996.
- July 4 – Steven Tyler and Joe Perry of Aerosmith perform with the Boston Pops Orchestra in an event televised nationally in the USA.
- July 5 – The US television talent show, American Idol, begins its tour.
- July 7 – Justin Timberlake released his single SexyBack. The song went on to top the Billboard Hot 100 for a total of 7 weeks.
- July 9 – Scooter releases the live CD and DVD Excess All Areas, with recordings taken from the Who's Got The Last Laugh Now? tour.
- July 11 – Jean Dolabella replaces Igor Cavalera in Sepultura.
- July 12 – Rivers Cuomo confirms that Weezer is now on hiatus again. Commenting on the band's future he said, "I'm not certain we'll ever make a record again, unless it becomes really obvious to me that we need to do one."
- July 17 – Canadian singer-songwriter Avril Lavigne marries Sum 41 frontman Deryck Whibley in a private ceremony.
- July 22 – Mariah starts her tour for The Emancipation of Mimi [The Adventures of Mimi].
  - Taylor Swift first video, "Tim McGraw" on Great American Country.
- July 29
  - Stephanie McIntosh, former star of the Australian television soap opera, Neighbours, releases her debut single, "Mistake", in Australia, where it became a top three hit.
  - Family Values Tour 2006, featuring Korn, Deftones and Stone Sour, begins. This was the first Family Values Tour since 2001.
- July 30 – The last ever weekly edition of the British television chart show, Top of the Pops, is broadcast after 42 years on the air.
- July 31 – Chicago rock band OK Go release their video for their single "Here It Goes Again", and the video quickly becomes an internet phenomenon on YouTube.

=== August ===
- August 1 – The 10th anniversary of television channel MTV2's launch and the 25th anniversary of MTV's launch.
- August 2 – Dan Swanö quits Bloodbath.
- August 4–6 – The Lollapalooza festival is held in Chicago, USA.
- August 15 – Christina Aguilera releases her third studio album Back to Basics, and debuts No. 1 on the Billboard 200; her first studio album in four years, it becomes her second number one album since her debut, selling 346,000 copies in its first week.
- August 21 – Anne-Sophie Mutter announces her divorce from André Previn.
- August 25
  - It is reported that Aerosmith bassist Tom Hamilton is undergoing treatment for throat cancer and will sit out the first half of the band's Route of All Evil Tour, the first time he would miss any shows in the band's history. Long time band friend David Hull filled in for Hamilton until his return.
  - The Assassin Tree (score: Stuart MacRae, libretto: Simon Armitage) is premiered at the Edinburgh International Festival.
- August 26 – David Gilmour's world tour ends with a performance at the Gdańsk shipyards, Gdańsk. The show was filmed and recorded for release of the live album set Live in Gdańsk (2008).
- August 29 – Jessica Simpson released her first album in three years, A Public Affair, after her "public" divorce.
- August 31 – Rock group Panic! at the Disco win the Video of the Year award for their hit single "I Write Sins Not Tragedies" at the 2006 MTV Video Music Awards.

=== September ===
- September 3 – Beyoncé Knowles releases her second consecutive No.1 solo album B'Day, selling 541,000 copies in its first week. And spawning two UK No.1 singles.
- September 5 – The Mercury Music Prize is held in the UK, with Arctic Monkeys' debut album Whatever People Say I Am, That's What I'm Not winning ahead of entries from acts such as Muse and Thom Yorke. Audioslave's third and final album, Revelations, is released.
- September 8 – Eddie Van Halen announces that the lineup for his next album will include his son Wolfgang on bass and not the longtime Van Halen bassist Michael Anthony, whom Eddie says he is on the outs with.
- September 12 – Justin Timberlake releases his second album FutureSex/LoveSounds after 4 years. The album debuted No. 1 on the Billboard 200, giving Justin his first number one album as a solo artist, selling 648,000 copies in its first week. Its first three singles were consecutive number-one hit on the Billboard Hot 100, making Timberlake the first male artist to have three or more consecutive number-one hits from one album since Usher achieved it in 2004
- September 18 – Elton John released his 29th studio album The Captain & the Kid.
- September 19
  - Ben Kweller releases his third solo album Ben Kweller on the label ATO Records.
  - Navin Kundra debuts with what became number one on the UK Asian Charts, Tukde, Tukde (Pieces in English). His first of six number one singles.
- September 22 – A Tempestade, (score and libretto: Ronaldo Miranda), based on Shakespeare's play The Tempest, is premiered at Theatro São Pedro in São Paulo, Brazil.
- September 27 – Boy band, Five, announce they are to reunite, minus original bandmate Sean Conlon.

=== October ===
- October 2 – Violinist and opera singer Logan Simpson is arrested for refusing to stop his car when a traffic light turns red.
- October 3 – Evanescence releases their second studio album The Open Door. The album debuted No. 1 on the Billboard 200.
- October 7 – Liquidation of the bankrupt music store chain Tower Records begins after its assets are purchased by Great American Group. The last store closes its doors permanently on December 22.
- October 10 – Justin Hawkins, lead singer of the band The Darkness announces he is leaving the band.
- October 11 – After 25 years as an artist, "Weird Al" Yankovic finally gets his first top 10 hit, with "White & Nerdy".
- October 15 – New York City music club CBGB closes after a lengthy rent dispute. Patti Smith performs the final show at the club that night.
- October 17 – French singer Manu Chao performs in Colombia to an audience of 80,000 people.
- October 23
  - Launch of MTV Pakistan.
  - My Chemical Romance release their third studio album The Black Parade, the first on which Bob Bryar plays drums.
- October 24 – Taylor Swift releases her debut self-titled album at the age of 16, which sold 39,000 in its first week.
- October 25 – Guitarist Brian May announces on his website that Queen is returning to the studio for recording sessions. The new lineup, Queen + Paul Rodgers, features May, Paul Rodgers (the former lead vocalist of Free) and former Queen drummer Roger Taylor.
- October 26 – Duran Duran lead guitarist Andy Taylor once again leaves the band after a series of disagreements surrounding their latest album, which was still incomplete by the year's end. Reasons given are his disapproval of the usage of both Timbaland and Justin Timberlake in the creation of the band's album. The band hires an interim guitarist to supplant Taylor, with no real replacement being announced.
- October 30
  - Keane release "Nothing In My Way", the first single to be released on a USB memory stick.
  - Bring Me the Horizon release Count Your Blessings, their debut album.
- October 31
  - The Who release Endless Wire, their first studio album for 24 years.
  - Green Day and U2 released a cover of "The Saints Are Coming".

=== November–December ===
- November 7
  - Nelly Furtado records a cameo appearance in the Portuguese soap opera Floribella.
  - Britney Spears files for divorce from Kevin Federline after two years of marriage.
- November 11
  - Justin Timberlake's single "My Love" reaches number one on the US Billboard Hot 100.
  - Kylie Minogue resumes Showgirl – The Homecoming Tour in Sydney, Australia after a break of a year and a half resulting from undergoing treatment for breast cancer.
- November 14 – Microsoft releases the first Zune media player.
- November 16
  - The MTV Movie Awards Latin America 2006 are held. Performers at the event included Evanescence, Robbie Williams, Panda, Nelly Furtado, and Shakira.
  - Snow Patrol become the first British band in 13 years to reach the top five of the US Billboard Hot 100.
- November 21 – American rock band Daughtry release their debut album, which sells 306,000 copies in the opening week, to become the fastest selling rock album in soundscan history.
- November 24 – The American Music Awards are broadcast. Winners include Kelly Clarkson, Red Hot Chili Peppers, Shakira, Jamie Foxx, Nickelback, Sean Paul, The Black Eyed Peas, Eminem, Faith Hill, Rascal Flatts, Tim McGraw and Mary J. Blige, Nelly Furtado, John Mayer, Fall Out Boy and Beyoncé performed at the event.
- November 26 – Damien Leith wins the Australian television talent show, Australian Idol 2006, becoming the oldest winner of any Idol show in the world and defeating 16-year-old Jessica Mauboy.
- November 27 – The Offspring announce that they were back in the studio recording their first album since 2003's Splinter.
- December 6 – December 6 is declared Dia de Shakira (Day of Shakira) by the mayor of Miami, USA.
- December 13 – David Silveria leaves Korn to manage his restaurant.
- December 16
  - Leona Lewis is named winner of the third series of The X Factor UK. Ray Quinn is named runner-up, while Ben Mills and The MacDonald Brothers finish in third and fourth place respectively.
  - The inaugural edition of the Premios Principales del Año (later known as Premios 40 Principales and currently Los 40 Music Awards) takes place in Madrid. El Canto del Loco win three awards in the national categories; Shakira wins two in the international categories.

=== Undated ===
- Bilal's second album, Love for Sale, is leaked and shelved by his record label.
- Rohan Kriwaczek's An Incomplete History of the Art of Funerary Violin, a non-existent musical genre, is published.

== Returning performers ==
- Bob Seger (first studio album since 1995)
- DMX (first studio album since 2003)
- Evanescence (first studio album since 2003)
- Jay-Z (first studio album since 2003)
- Jurassic 5 (first studio album since 2002)
- Red Hot Chili Peppers (first studio album since 2002)
- Rob Zombie (first studio album since 2001)
- Stone Sour (first studio album since 2002)
- Tenacious D (first studio album since 2001)
- The Coup (first studio album since 2001)

== Bands on hiatus ==
- Black Sabbath

== Bands reformed ==
- Orchestral Manoeuvres in the Dark (reunited after 1996 disbandment; co-founder Paul Humphreys re-joined the group for the first time since 1989)
- Take That (4 out of 5 original members reunited after the group disbanded in 1996)

== Top 10 best-selling albums of 2006 ==
No.	Artist	Album	Copies sold
1.	High School Musical cast	Soundtrack	8,500,000
2.	Justin Timberlake	FutureSex/LoveSounds	8,350,000
3.	Nelly Furtado	Loose	8,200,000
4.	Red Hot Chili Peppers	Stadium Arcadium	7,900,000
5.	Carrie Underwood	Some Hearts	6,900,000
6.	Pink	I'm Not Dead	6,500,000
7.	Beyoncé	B'Day	8,700,000
8.	The Beatles	Love	5,650,000
9.	Daughtry	Daughtry	4,900,000
10.	Taylor Swift	Taylor Swift	4,500,000

== Songs released in 2006 ==
Date	Song	Artist
January 12	"Ridin'"	Chamillionaire featuring Krayzie Bone
January 16	"I Write Sins Not Tragedies"	Panic! at the Disco
January 17	"Pump It"	The Black Eyed Peas
February 13	"Far Away"	Nickelback
February 14	"S.O.S."	Rihanna
February 27	"Move Along"	The All-American Rejects
February 28	"Hips Don't Lie"	Shakira featuring Wyclef Jean
March 13	"Crazy"	Gnarls Barkley
March 14	"World Wide Suicide"	Pearl Jam
March 18	"The Best of Both Worlds"	Hannah Montana
March 18	"If We Were a Movie"	Hannah Montana
March 21	"Do It to It"	Cherish featuring Sean Paul of YoungBloodZ
March 26	"Gorillaz"	Gorillaz
April 11	"No Hay Igual"	Nelly Furtado
April 25	"Promiscuous"	Nelly Furtado featuring Timbaland
May 2	"Unfaithful"	Rihanna
May 12	"Maneater"	Nelly Furtado featuring Timbaland
May 29	"Mas que Nada"	Sérgio Mendes featuring The Black Eyed Peas
June 6	"Ain't No Other Man"	Christina Aguilera
June 6	"Chasing Cars"	Snow Patrol
June 20	"A Little Less Sixteen Candles, a Little More "Touch Me""	Fall Out Boy
July 18	"SexyBack"	Justin Timberlake featuring Timbaland
July 19	"Don't Stop Believin'"	Scissor Sisters
July 24	"Lips of an Angel"	Hinder
July 24	"Too Little Too Late"	JoJo
August 7	"Lying Is the Most Fun a Girl Can Have Without Taking Her Clothes Off"	Panic! at the Disco
August 11	"Hurt"	Christina Aguilera
August 21	"We Ride"	Rihanna
September 6	"Starlight"	Muse
September 12	"Welcome to the Black Parade"	My Chemical Romance
October 3	"Unappreciated"	Cherish
October 23	"Fergalicious"	Fergie featuring will.i.am
October 24	"My Love"	Justin Timberlake featuring T.I.
October 30	"Pick of Destiny"	Tenacious D
October 31	"Say It Right"	Timbaland featuring Nelly Furtado
November 13	"Break it Off"	Rihanna featuring Sean Paul
November 17	"All Good Things (Come to an End)"	Nelly Furtado
November 22	"The Metal"	Tenacious D
November 27	"Knights of Cydonia"	Muse

== Top hits on record in the world ==
=== United States ===
Billboard Hot 100 No. 1 Hits

- "Bad Day" – Daniel Powter (5 weeks)
- "Check on It" – Beyoncé featuring Slim Thug (5 weeks)
- "Do I Make You Proud" – Taylor Hicks (1 week)
- "Don't Forget About Us" – Mariah Carey (1 week in 2005/1 week in 2006)
- "Hips Don't Lie" – Shakira featuring Wyclef Jean (2 weeks)
- "Grillz" – Nelly featuring Paul Wall, Ali and Big Gipp (2 weeks)
- "I Wanna Love You" – Akon featuring Snoop Dogg (2 weeks)
- "Irreplaceable" – Beyoncé (3 weeks in 2006/7 weeks in 2007)
- "Laffy Taffy" – D4L (1 week)
- "London Bridge" – Fergie (3 weeks)
- "Money Maker" – Ludacris featuring Pharrell (2 weeks)
- "My Love" – Justin Timberlake featuring T.I. (3 weeks)
- "Promiscuous" – Nelly Furtado featuring Timbaland (6 weeks)
- "Ridin'" – Chamillionaire featuring Krayzie Bone (2 weeks)
- "SexyBack" – Justin Timberlake featuring Timbaland (7 weeks)
- "So Sick" – Ne-Yo (2 weeks)
- "SOS (Rescue Me)" – Rihanna (3 weeks)
- "Temperature" – Sean Paul (1 week)
- "You're Beautiful" – James Blunt (1 week)

Billboard Hot 100 Hits – Singles which have ranked within Top 20

- "Ain't No Other Man" – Christina Aguilera (#6)
- "America" – Razorlight
- "Beast and the Harlot" – Avenged Sevenfold
- "Beep" – Pussycat Dolls featuring will.i.am (#13)
- "Before He Cheats" – Carrie Underwood (#8)
- "Bones" – The Killers
- "Bossy" – Kelis (#16)
- "Breaking Free" – Zac Efron, Drew Seeley and Vanessa Anne Hudgens (#4)
- "But It's Better If You Do" – Panic! at the Disco
- "Buttons" – Pussycat Dolls featuring Snoop Dogg (#3)
- "Call Me When You're Sober" – Evanescence
- "Chain Hang Low" – Jibbs (#7)
- "Chasing Cars" – Snow Patrol (#5)
- "Check on It" – Beyoncé featuring Slim Thug (#1)
- "Chelsea Dagger" – The Fratellis
- "Come To Me" – Diddy featuring Nicole Scherzinger (#9)
- "Control Myself" – LL Cool J featuring Jennifer Lopez (#4)
- "Crazy" – Gnarls Barkley (#2)
- "Cupid's Chokehold" – Gym Class Heroes featuring Patrick Stump (#4)
- "Dani California" – Red Hot Chili Peppers (#6)
- "Deja Vu" – Beyoncé Knowles featuring Jay-Z (#4)
- "Dick In A Box" – The Lonely Island
- "Do It To It" – Cherish featuring Sean Paul of The YoungBloodZ (#12)
- "El Mañana" – Gorillaz
- "Far Away" – Nickelback (#8)
- "Fergalicious" – Fergie featuring will.i.am(#3; later peaked at No. 2 in 2007)
- "From Yesterday" – Thirty Seconds to Mars
- "Get Up" – Ciara featuring Chamillionaire (#7)
- "Gimme That" – Chris Brown featuring Lil Wayne (#15)
- "Gone Going" – The Black Eyed Peas featuring Jack Johnson
- "High School Never Ends" – Bowling for Soup
- "Hips Don't Lie" – Shakira featuring Wyclef Jean (#1)
- "How To Save A Life" – The Fray
- "Hurt" – Christina Aguilera (#19)
- "I Know You See It" – Yung Joc (#17)
- "I Write Sins Not Tragedies" – Panic! at the Disco (#7)
- "Irreplaceable" – Beyoncé (#1)
- "It Ends Tonight" – The All-American Rejects
- "It's Goin' Down" – Yung Joc (#3)
- "It's Not Over" – Daughtry (#4)
- "It's Not Your Fault" – New Found Glory
- "Jesus, Take the Wheel" – Carrie Underwood (#20)
- "Just Friends" – Gavin DeGraw
- "Keep Holding On" – Avril Lavigne (#17)
- "Kids with Guns" – Gorillaz
- "The Kill (Bury Me)" – Thirty Seconds to Mars
- "La Camisa Negra" – Juanes
- "Lean Wit It, Rock Wit It" – Dem Franchize Boyz (#7)
- "Leave the Pieces" – The Wreckers (#34)
- "Let U Go" – Ashley Parker Angel (#12)
- "Life Is a Highway" – Rascal Flatts (#7)
- "Lights and Sounds" – Yellowcard
- "Lips of an Angel" – Hinder (#3)
- "A Little Less Sixteen Candles, A Little More "Touch Me"" – Fall Out Boy
- "Love" – Keyshia Cole (#19)
- "Love Me or Hate Me" – Lady Sovereign
- "Lying Is the Most Fun a Girl Can Have Without Taking Her Clothes Off" – Panic! at the Disco
- "MakeDamnSure" – Taking Back Sunday
- "Maneater" – Nelly Furtado (#16)
- "Me & U" – Cassie (#3)
- "Miss Murder" – AFI (#24)
- "Move Along" – The All-American Rejects
- "Ms. New Booty" – Bubba Sparxxx featuring Ying Yang Twins & Mr. ColliPark (#7)
- "Over My Head (Cable Car)" – The Fray
- "Patience" – Take That
- "Promise" – Ciara (#11)
- "A Public Affair" – Jessica Simpson (#14)
- "Pullin' Me Back" – Chingy featuring Tyrese (#9)
- "Pump It" – The Black Eyed Peas (#18)
- "Ridin'" – Chamillionaire featuring Krayzie Bone
- "Ring The Alarm" – Beyoncé Knowles (#11)
- "Rough Landing, Holly" – Yellowcard
- "Say Goodbye" – Chris Brown (#10)
- "Say It Right" – Nelly Furtado (#6)
- "Savin' Me" – Nickelback (#19)
- "Seize the Day" – Avenged Sevenfold
- "Sexy Love" – Ne-Yo (#7)
- "SexyBack" – Justin Timberlake featuring Timbaland (#1)
- "Shake That" – Eminem featuring Nate Dogg (#6)
- "Shortie Like Mine" – Bow Wow featuring Chris Brown and Johnta Austin (#9)
- "Shoulder Lean" – Young Dro featuring T.I. (#10)
- "Show Me What You Got" – Jay-Z (#8)
- "Show Stopper" – Danity Kane (#8)
- "Smack That" – Akon featuring Eminem (#2)
- "Snap Yo Fingers" – Lil Jon featuring E-40 and Sean Paul of The YoungBloodZ (#7)
- "So What" – Field Mob featuring Ciara (#10)
- "Somewhere Over the Rainbow" – Katharine McPhee (#12)
- "Stars Are Blind" – Paris Hilton (#18)
- "Stupid Girls" – P!nk (#13)
- "Temperature" – Sean Paul
- "That's That" – Snoop Dogg featuring R. Kelly (#20)
- "Tokyo Drift" – Teriyaki Boyz
- "Too Little Too Late" – JoJo (#3)
- "Top of the World" – The All-American Rejects
- "U and Dat" – E-40 featuring T-Pain and Kandi Girl (#13)
- "Unfaithful" – Rihanna (#6)
- "Unpredictable" – Jamie Foxx
- "Waiting On the World to Change" – John Mayer (#20)
- "Walk Away" – Kelly Clarkson (#12)
- "Walk It Out" – Unk (#14)
- "Welcome to the Black Parade" – My Chemical Romance
- "What Hurts the Most" – Rascal Flatts (#6)
- "What You Know" – T.I. (#3)
- "What's Left of Me" – Nick Lachey (#6)
- "When You're Mad" – Ne-Yo (#15)
- "When I'm Gone" – Eminem (#8)
- "(When You Gonna) Give It Up To Me" – Sean Paul featuring Keyshia Cole (#3)
- "When You Were Young" – The Killers
- "Where'd You Go" – Fort Minor featuring Holly Brook (#4)
- "White & Nerdy" – "Weird Al" Yankovic
- "Yo (Excuse Me Miss)" – Chris Brown (#7)
- "You Don't Know" – Eminem featuring 50 Cent, Cashis, and Lloyd Banks (#12)

Billboard Year-End Hot 100 singles of 2006

=== United Kingdom ===
The Official UK No. 1 Singles

- "America" – Razorlight (1 week)
- "Crazy" – Gnarls Barkley (9 weeks)
- "Déjà Vu" – Beyoncé Knowles featuring Jay-Z (1 week)
- "Don't Stop Believin'" – Scissor Sisters (4 weeks)
- "I Wish I Was A Punk Rocker" – Sandi Thom (1 week)
- "It's Chico Time" – Chico (2 weeks)
- "Hips Don't Lie" – Shakira featuring Wyclef Jean (4 weeks, 5 weeks in total)
- "Maneater" – Nelly Furtado (3 weeks)
- "A Moment Like This" – Leona Lewis (2 weeks)
- "Nasty Girl" – The Notorious B.I.G. featuring Diddy, Nelly, Jagged Edge, and Avery Storm (2 weeks)
- "No Tomorrow" – Orson (1 week)
- "Patience" – Take That (3 weeks)
- "Please, Please/Don't Stop Me Now" – McFly (1 week)
- "Put Your Hands Up For Detroit" – Fedde Le Grand (1 week)
- "The Rose" – Westlife (1 week)
- "SexyBack" – Justin Timberlake (1 week)
- "Smack That" – Akon (Featuring Eminem) (1 week)
- "Smile" – Lily Allen (2 weeks)
- "So Sick" – Ne-Yo (1 week)
- "Sorry" – Madonna (1 week)
- "Star Girl" – McFly (1 week)
- "Thunder In My Heart Again" – Meck and Leo Sayer (2 weeks)
- "Welcome to the Black Parade" – My Chemical Romance (2 weeks)
- "When the Sun Goes Down" – Arctic Monkeys (1 week)

The Official UK Hit Singles – Singles which have ranked within Top 20

- "The Adventure" – Angels & Airwaves (#20)
- "After All This Time" – Simon Webbe (#16)
- "Ain't No Other Man" – Christina Aguilera (#2)
- "All Good Things (Come to an End)" – Nelly Furtado (#4)
- "All Time Love" – Will Young (#3)
- "Always on Your Side"(with Sting) – Sheryl Crow (#4)
- "Amazing" – Westlife (#4)
- "Analogue (All I Want)" – A-Ha (#10)
- "Angel" – Pharrell Williams (#15)
- "Bad" – Michael Jackson (#16) (re-release)
- "Bang Bang You're Dead" – Dirty Pretty Things (#5)
- "Beat It" – Michael Jackson (#15) (re-release)
- "Beautiful Soul" – Jesse McCartney (#16)
- "Because I Want You" – Placebo (#13)
- "Beep" – Pussycat Dolls featuring Will.I.Am (#2)
- "Better Do Better" – HARD-Fi (#14)
- "Billie Jean" – Michael Jackson (#11) (re-release)
- "Black or White" – Michael Jackson (#18) (re-release)
- "Bones" – The Killers (#15)
- "Boyfriend" – Ashlee Simpson (#12)
- "Boys Will Be Boys" – The Ordinary Boys (#3)
- "Break the Night with Colour" – Richard Ashcroft (#3)
- "Bright Idea" – Orson (#11)
- "Burning Benches" – Morning Runner (#19)
- "Buttons" – Pussycat Dolls featuring Snoop Dogg (#3)
- "Call Me When You're Sober" – Evanescence (#4)
- "Call on Me" – Janet Jackson and Nelly (#18)
- "Chasing Cars" – Snow Patrol (#6)
- "Check on It" – Beyoncé Knowles featuring Slim Thug (#3)
- "Checkin' It Out" – Lil' Chris (#3)
- "Come To Me" – Diddy featuring Nicole Scherzinger (#3)
- "Control Myself" – LL Cool J featuring Jennifer Lopez (#2)
- "Country Girl" – Primal Scream (#5)
- "Crystal Ball" – Keane (#20)
- "Dance, Dance" – Fall Out Boy (#8)
- "Dancin'" – Aaron Smith Featuring. Luvli (#20)
- "Dani California" – Red Hot Chili Peppers (#2)
- "Different World" – Iron Maiden (#3)
- "Dirty Diana" – Michael Jackson (#17) (re-release)
- "Do You Ever Think of Me" – Antony Costa (#19)
- "Don't Bother" – Shakira (#9)
- "Don't Stop 'Til You Get Enough" – Michael Jackson (#17) (re-release)
- "Downtown" – Emma Bunton (#3)
- "Dreams" – Deep Dish feat. Stevie Nicks (#14)
- "Eddie's Song" – Son Of Dork (#10)
- "Everytime We Touch" – Cascada (#2)
- "The Fallen / L. Wells" – Franz Ferdinand (#14)
- "Faster Kill Pussycat" – Oakenfold featuring Brittany Murphy (#7)
- "Fill My Little World" – The Feeling (#10)
- "First Time" – Sunblock feat. Robin Beck (#9)
- "Fly" – Hilary Duff (#20)
- "From Paris to Berlin" – Infernal (#2)
- "Funny Little Frog" – Belle & Sebastian (#10)
- "Get Together" – Madonna (#7)
- "Gold Lion" – Yeah Yeah Yeahs (#18)
- "Grow" – Kubb (#18)
- "Heartbeats" – José González (#9)
- "Here We Go" – Trina feat. Kelly Rowland (#15)
- "He's the Greatest Dancer" – Dannii Minogue (#3)
- "Hustler's Ambition" – 50 Cent (#13)
- "I See You You See Me" – The Magic Numbers (#20)
- "I'll Be Ready" – Sunblock (#4)
- "I'm with Stupid" – Pet Shop Boys (#8)
- "In the Closet" – Michael Jackson (#20) (re-release)
- "Incredible" – Shapeshifters (#12)
- "Irreplaceable" – Beyoncé Knowles (#4)
- "Is It Any Wonder?" – Keane (#3)
- "Is It Just Me?" – The Darkness (#8)
- "It's All Coming Back to Me Now" – Meat Loaf featuring Marion Raven (#6)
- "Jump In My Car" – David Hasselhoff (#3)
- "Knights of Cydonia" – Muse (#10)
- "Leave Me Alone" – Michael Jackson (#15) (re-release)
- "Like You" – Bow Wow feat. Ciara (#10)
- "Live with Me" – Massive Attack (#17)
- "Lost & Found" – Feeder (#12)
- "Love Don't Let Me Go (Walking Away)" – David Guetta vs. The Egg (#3)
- "Lovelight" – Robbie Williams (#8)
- "Make a Move on Me" – Joey Negro (#11)
- "Moodswings (To Come at Me Like That)" – Charlotte Church (#14)
- "Most Precious Love" – Blaze feat. Barbara Tucker (#17)
- "Munich" – Editors (#10)
- "Music Is Power" – Richard Ashcroft (#20)
- "Naïve" – The Kooks (#5)
- "Nature's Law" – Embrace (#2)
- "Never Wanna Say" – Soundbwoy Ent (#18)
- "Nine2Five" – The Ordinary Boys vs. Lady Sovereign (#6)
- "No Promises" – Shayne Ward (#2)
- "Nobody Knows" – Pink (#4)
- "Nothing In My Way" – Keane (#19)
- "One" – Mary J. Blige featuring U2 (#2)
- "One More Night Alone" – Friday Hill (#13)
- "One Wish" – Ray J (#13)
- "Piece of My Heart" – Beverley Knight (#16)
- "Promiscuous" – Nelly Furtado featuring Timbaland (#3)
- "Pump It" – The Black Eyed Peas (#3)
- "Put Your Records On" – Corinne Bailey Rae (#2)
- "Run It" – Chris Brown featuring Juelz Santana (#2)
- "Red Dress" – Sugababes (#4)
- "Ride A White Horse" – Goldfrapp (#15)
- "Ridin'" – Chamillionaire featuring Krayzie Bone (#2)
- "Rock with You" – Michael Jackson (#15) (re-release)
- "Rooftops" – Lostprophets (#8)
- "Rudebox" – Robbie Williams (#4)
- "The Saints Are Coming" – U2 and Green Day (#6)
- "Say I" – Christina Milian feat. Young Jeezy (#4)
- "Say Say Say (Waiting 4 U)" – Hi-Tack (#4)
- "Sewn" – The Feeling (#7)
- "She Moves In Her Own Way" – The Kooks (#8)
- "Sleep" – Texas (#6)
- "Smooth Criminal" – Michael Jackson (#19) (re-release)
- "Snow ((Hey Oh))" – Red Hot Chili Peppers (#16)
- "Somebody's Watching Me" – Beatfreakz (#3)
- "Something Kinda Ooooh" – Girls Aloud (#3)
- "SOS (Rescue Me)" – Rihanna (#2)
- "Soul Survivor" – Young Jeezy Featuring. Akon (#10)
- "Speechless" – Mish Mash (#16)
- "Standing In The Way Of Control" – Gossip (#5)
- "Standing On My Own Again" – Graham Coxon (#20)
- "Stars Are Blind" – Paris Hilton (#5)
- "Steady As She Goes" – The Raconteurs (#4)
- "Stoned In Love" – Chicane feat. Tom Jones (#7)
- "Stupid Girls" – Pink (#4)
- "Suffer Well" – Depeche Mode (#12)
- "Suzie" – Boy Kill Boy (#17)
- "Talk" – Coldplay (#10) (released in 2005)
- "Teenage Life" – Daz Sampson (#8)
- "Tell Me Baby" – Red Hot Chili Peppers (#16)
- "Temperature" – Sean Paul (#11)
- "Touch It" – Busta Rhymes (#6)
- "Touch the Sky" – Kanye West feat. Lupe Fiasco (#6)
- "U + Ur Hand" – Pink (#10)
- "Unbelievable" – Craig David (#18)
- "Unfaithful" – Rihanna (#2)
- "Unpredictable" – Jamie Foxx feat. Ludacris (#16)
- "Voodoo Child" – Rogue Traders (#3)
- "Watchin'" – Freemasons feat. Amanda Wilson (#19)
- "The Way You Make Me Feel" – Michael Jackson (#17) (re-release)
- "Welcome to Wherever You Are" – Bon Jovi (#19)
- "We Are Your Friends" – Justice vs Simian (#20)
- "We Ride" – Rihanna (#17)
- "The Weakness in Me" – Keisha White (#17)
- "When I Think of You" – Lee Ryan (#15)
- "When You Wasn't Famous" – The Streets (#8)
- "When I'm Gone" – Eminem (#4)
- "Who Am I" – Will Young (#11)
- "Who Knew" – Pink (#5)
- "Who Says You Can't Go Home" – Bon Jovi (#5)
- "Whole Lotta History" – Girls Aloud (#6)
- "Why Won't You Give Me Your Love?" – The Zutons (#9)
- "Wind It Up" – Gwen Stefani (#3)
- "Woman in Love" – Liz McClarnon (#5)
- "Wonderful World" – James Morrison (#8)
- "The Yeah Yeah Yeah Song (With All Your Power)" – Flaming Lips (#16)
- "Yo (Excuse Me Miss)" – Chris Brown (#13)
- "You Don't Love Me" – The Kooks (#12)
- "You Give Me Something" – James Morrison (#5)
- "You Got The Love" – The Source feat. Candi Staton (#7)
- "You Have Killed Me" – Morrissey (#3)
- "You Only Live Once" – The Strokes (#14)
- "You're All I Have" – Snow Patrol (#7)
- "You Spin Me Round" – Dead or Alive (#5)

=== Australia ===
- "Flaunt It" – TV Rock featuring Seany B (5 weeks)
- "Forever Young" – Youth Group (2 weeks)
- "Hips Don't Lie" – Shakira featuring Wyclef Jean (9 weeks)
- "Don't Stop Believin'" – Scissor Sisters (2 weeks)
- "I Wish I Was a Punk Rocker (with Flowers in My Hair)" – Sandi Thom (10 weeks)
- "Love Generation" – Bob Sinclar featuring Gary Pine (2 weeks)
- "Night of My Life" – Damien Leith (3 weeks)
- "Run It!" – Chris Brown featuring Juelz Santana (3 weeks)
- "The Saints Are Coming" – U2 and Green Day (1 week)
- "SexyBack" – Justin Timberlake (2 weeks)
- "SOS" – Rihanna (8 weeks)
- "Wasabi/Eye of the Tiger" – Lee Harding (3 weeks)
- "When I'm Gone" – Eminem (1 week)

Australian ARIA Hit Singles – Singles which have ranked within Top 20

- "Ain't No Other Man" – Christina Aguilera (#6)
- "Beep" – The Pussycat Dolls featuring will.i.am (#3)
- "Black Fingernails, Red Wine" – Eskimo Joe (#6)
- "Bossy" – Kelis (#18)
- "Buttons" – The Pussycat Dolls (#2)
- "Dani California" – Red Hot Chili Peppers (#8)
- "Deja Vu" – Beyoncé Knowles featuring Jay-Z (#12)
- "Don't Give Up" – Stephen Multari & Shae Brewster (#2)
- "Faded" – Kate DeAraugo (#8)
- "Goodbye My Lover" – James Blunt (#3)
- "Grillz" – Nelly featuring Paul Wall, Ali & Gipp (#11)
- "Joker & the Thief" – Wolfmother (#8)
- "L.O.V.E." – Ashlee Simpson (#5)
- "Maneater" – Nelly Furtado (#4)
- "Miss Murder" – AFI (#20)
- "Mistake" – Stephanie McIntosh (#3)
- "Nasty Girl" – The Notorious B.I.G. featuring Diddy, Nelly, Jagged Edge & Avery Storm (#15)
- "Nothing at All" – Kasey Chambers (#9)
- "Now I Run" – Shannon Noll (#6)
- "Promiscuous" – Nelly Furtado featuring Timbaland (#2)
- "Pump It" – Black Eyed Peas (#6)
- "Put Your Money Where Your Mouth Is" – Jet (#14)
- "Savin' Me" – Nickelback (#18)
- "Sexy Love" – Ne-Yo (#14)
- "Shine On" – Jet (#20)
- "So Sick" – Ne-Yo (#4)
- "So Under Pressure" – Dannii Minogue (#16)
- "Sorry" – Madonna (#4)
- "Stupid Girls" – Pink (#4)
- "Tell Me Baby" – Red Hot Chili Peppers (#20)
- "Temperature" – Sean Paul (#5)
- "This Time I Know It's for Real" – Young Divas (#2)
- "Tightrope" – Stephanie McIntosh (#16)
- "Together We Are One – Delta Goodrem (#2)
- "Touch The Sky" – Kanye West (#10)
- "U + Ur Hand – Pink (#6)
- "Unfaithful – Rihanna (#2)
- "Watching You" – Rogue Traders (#5)
- "We Are the Champions (Ding a Dang Dong)" – Crazy Frog (#13)
- "What's Left of Me" – Nick Lachey (#8)
- "When It All Falls Apart" – The Veronicas (#7)
- "Who Knew" – Pink (#2)
- "Wisemen" – James Blunt (#11)
- "Yo (Excuse Me Miss)" – Chris Brown (#10)
- "You Raise Me Up" – Westlife (#3)

== Classical music ==
The following composers' works were composed, premiered, or published this year, as noted in the citation.

=== A ===
- Christopher Adler – Music for a Royal Palace

=== B ===
- Leonardo Balada – Concerto for Three Cellos and Orchestra
- Ioseb Bardanashvili – Symphony No. 3 Bameh Madlikin

=== F ===
- Lorenzo Ferrero
  - DEsCH, for oboe, bassoon, piano and orchestra
  - Mozart a Recanati, for one actress, one voice, string trio, clarinet and piano
  - La conquista, suite for choir and orchestra
  - Haring at the Exhibition, ambient piece

=== G ===
- Philip Glass – The Passion of Ramakrishna, for chorus and orchestra

=== K ===
- Wojciech Kilar –
  - Magnificat for 3 solo voices, choir and orchestra
  - Three Mazurkas

=== M ===
- Krzysztof Meyer
  - Double Concerto for violin, violoncello and orchestra
  - Sonata No. 6 for Piano

=== P ===
- Alla Pavlova – Symphony No. 5

=== R ===
- Steve Reich – Daniel Variations
- Behzad Ranjbaran – Persian Trilogy

=== S ===
- Marijn Simons – Symphony No. 2, Op. 33
- Karlheinz Stockhausen
  - Natürliche Dauern (Natural Durations), for piano
  - Harmonien (Harmonies), three versions: for solo bass clarinet, for solo flute, for solo trumpet
  - Schönheit (Beauty), for flute, trumpet, and bass clarinet
  - Türin, for Tür (door), rin, and speaker (versions in German and English), with electronics,

== Opera ==
- Jorge Antunes – Olga
- George Benjamin – Into the Little Hill
- Jonathan Dove – The Enchanted Pig
- Tan Dun – The First Emperor
- Stephen Hartke – The Greater Good, or the Passion of Boule de Suif
- Stuart MacRae – The Assassin Tree (with libretto by Simon Armitage)
- Ernst Mahle – O Garatuja
- Ronaldo Miranda – A Tempestade
- Robert Xavier Rodriguez – La Curandera
- Ned Rorem – Our Town
- Salvatore Sciarrino – Da gelo a gelo
- Kaija Saariaho
  - Adriana Mater
  - La Passion de Simone
- Somtow Sucharitkul – Ayodhya

== Musical theater ==
- Grey Gardens – Broadway production opened at the Walter Kerr Theatre on November 2 and ran for 308 performances
- Mary Poppins – Broadway production opened at the New Amsterdam Theatre on November 16 and ran for 2619 performances
- The Phantom of the Opera officially became the longest Broadway running musical ever on January 9, at 7486 performances surpassing the previous record holder, Cats, also written by Andrew Lloyd Webber
- Spring Awakening – Broadway production opened at the Eugene O'Neill Theatre on December 10 and ran for 859 performances
- Tarzan – Broadway production opened at the Richard Rodgers Theatre on May 10 and ran for 486 performances
- The Wedding Singer – Broadway production opened at the Al Hirschfeld Theatre on April 27 and ran for 284 performances.

== Musical film ==
- Adaikalam, with music by Sabesh–Murali, released on December 29.
- American Hardcore, documentary of early hardcore punk rock, released on September 22.
- Antônia, the story of an Afro-Brazilian hip-hop girl group, released on September 8.
- Bolletjes Blues, a Dutch film starring Negativ, released on March 23.
- The Cheetah Girls 2, a Disney Channel Original Movie watched by 8.1 million viewers in its premiere broadcast on August 25.
- Dixie Chicks: Shut Up and Sing, documentary on the Dixie Chicks, released on September 12.
- Dreamgirls starring Jamie Foxx, Beyoncé Knowles, Eddie Murphy, Danny Glover and Jennifer Hudson, released on December 15
- Hannah Montana, a Disney Channel original series about a pop star, premiered on March 24.
- Happy Feet, a film with the voices of Nicole Kidman, Elijah Wood, Hugh Jackman, Brittany Murphy, Robin Williams and Anthony LaPaglia, released on November 17.
- High School Musical, a Disney Channel Original Movie watched by 7.7 million viewers in its premiere broadcast on January 20.
- Love @ First Note, with music by Mark Lui.
- Neil Young: Heart of Gold, a film directed by Jonathan Demme, released on February 10.
- Opera Jawa, directed by Garin Nugroho and featuring traditional Javanese classical music and dance, released August 7.
- Peter & the Wolf, short Polish-British-Norwegian-Mexican-Swiss stop-motion animated film, released on September 23.
- PollyWorld, direct-to-video animated film, released on November 14.
- Rani Kuthir Baki Itihash, directed by Samia Zaman, released on June 6.
- Take the Lead, a film starring Antonio Banderas and Alfre Woodard, released on April 7.

== Musical television ==
- Nodame Cantabile

== Births ==
- January 10
  - Angelina Jordan, Norwegian-American singer
  - Lumi Athena, American-Mexican singer, songwriter, and record producer
- January 20 - Chuckyy, American rapper and record producer
- January 24 - 2Slimey, Mexican-American rapper
- February 10 - Megan Skiendiel, American singer, dancer, actress and member of Katseye
- February 20 – Luh Tyler, American rapper
- February 24 – Jaydes, American rapper and singer-songwriter
- March 10 – Kyle Alessandro, Norwegian-Spanish singer-songwriter
- March 23 – Bella Kay, American indie pop singer-songwriter
- April 15 – Violet Grohl, daughter of Dave Grohl
- April 19 - Laila!, American singer
- May 14 – Bluebell Madonna Halliwell, daughter of Geri Halliwell and Sacha Gervasi
- May 26 – Kingston James McGregor Rossdale, son of Gwen Stefani and Gavin Rossdale
- June 25 - Mckenna Grace, American actress and singer
- July 18 - Daneliya Tuleshova, Kazakhstani singer
- August 29 - Che, American rapper, singer, songwriter, and producer
- September 9 - Gabriela Bee, Canadian actress, singer, and youtuber
- September 12 – Jayden James Federline, son of Britney Spears and Kevin Federline
- October 16 – Waylon Wyatt, American country music singer-songwriter, musician, and producer
- October 18 - Chino Pacas, Mexican singer-songwriter
- October 23 - Victor Vernicos, Greek singer
- October 25 - Milo J, Argentine rapper, singer and songwriter
- November 14 - tana, American rapper
- November 16 - Mason Ramsey, American singer
- November 28 – Romy Mars, American actress and singer
- November 29 - DD Osama, American rapper
- December 5 - Silia Kapsis, Australian-Cypriot singer, dancer

== Deaths ==
=== January–February ===
- January 1 – Bryan Harvey, American singer-guitarist of House of Freaks, 49 (murdered)
- January 6
  - Lou Rawls, American soul singer, 72
  - Alex St. Clair, American drummer of Captain Beefheart, 64
- January 11 – Markus Löffel, German disc jockey, 39
- January 19 – Wilson Pickett, American singer, 64
- January 22 – Janette Carter, member of the Carter Family, 82
- January 27 – Gene McFadden, American singer-songwriter and producer, 56
- January 30 – Thomas "Pig Champion" Roberts, American guitarist of Poison Idea, 47
- February 3 – Romano Mussolini, Italian jazz pianist, 78
- February 8
  - Elton Dean, English jazz saxophonist, 60
  - Akira Ifukube, Japanese classical music/film composer, 91
- February 10 – J Dilla, American hip hop producer, 32
- February 11 – Jockey Shabalala, South African bass vocalist of Ladysmith Black Mambazo, 62
- February 15 – Anna Marly, French singer-songwriter, 88
- February 16 – Sid Feller, conductor and arranger, 89
- February 18 – Bill Cowsill, American singer-songwriter and guitarist (The Cowsills), 58
- February 22 – Anthony Burger, American gospel music pianist, 44

=== March–April ===
- March 1 – Johnny Jackson, drummer of The Jackson 5, 54 (murdered)
- March 3 – Ivor Cutler, poet and songwriter, 83
- March 7 – Ali Farka Touré, Malian singer and guitarist, 66
- March 10
  - Anna Moffo, American operatic soprano, 75
  - Graciela Silvain, Argentine-born American soprano
- March 17
  - Narvin Kimball, jazz musician, 97
  - Professor X the Overseer, rapper, 49
- March 23
  - Pío Leyva, Cuban singer of the Buena Vista Social Club, 88
  - Cindy Walker, American country singer-songwriter, 87
- March 25
  - Buck Owens, American country singer and guitarist, 76
  - Rocío Dúrcal, Spanish singer and actress, 62
- March 26 – Nikki Sudden, English singer-songwriter, 49
- March 30 – Jackie McLean, American jazz alto saxophonist, 74
- April 2 – Bernard Seigal, guitarist and critic, 48
- April 5 – Gene Pitney, American singer-songwriter, 66
- April 11
  - June Pointer, American singer of Pointer Sisters, 52
  - Proof (DeShaun Holton), American rapper of D12, 32
- April 23 – Phil Walden, co-founder of Capricorn Records, 66
- April 24
  - Erik Bergman, Finnish composer of classical music, 94
  - Bonnie Owens, American country singer, 76
- April 28 – Ben-Zion Orgad, Israeli composer, 80

=== May–June ===
- May 1 – Naushad, Indian composer, 86
- May 6 – Grant McLennan, Australian guitarist and songwriter of The Go Betweens, 48
- May 7 – Steve Bender, Dschinghis Khan, The Poor Things, 60
- May 10
  - Soraya, Colombian-American singer, 37
  - John Hicks, American jazz pianist, 65
- May 13 – Johnnie Wilder, American singer of Heatwave, 56
- May 15 – Cheikha Rimitti, Algerian singer, 83
- May 18 – Andy Capps, American drummer of Built to Spill, 37
- May 19 – Freddie Garrity, English singer of Freddie and the Dreamers, 69
- May 23
  - Clifford Antone, American music executive, 56
  - Ian Copeland, American music promoter, 57
- May 25 – Desmond Dekker, Jamaican ska and reggae performer, 64
- June 1 – Rocío Jurado, Spanish singer and actress, 62
- June 2
  - Johnny Grande, American keyboardist of Bill Haley & His Comets, 76
  - Vince Welnick, American keyboardist of Grateful Dead, 55
- June 6
  - Billy Preston, American soul keyboardist, 59
  - Hilton Ruiz, Puerto Rican-American jazz pianist, 54
- June 12 – György Ligeti, Hungarian composer, 83
- June 20 – Claydes Charles Smith, American guitarist of Kool and the Gang, 57
- June 26 – Arif Mardin, Turkish-American music producer, 74
- June 27 – Eileen Barton, American singer, 76
- June 29 – Joyce Hatto, British concert pianist and piano teacher, 77

=== July–August ===
- July 3
  - Lorraine Hunt Lieberson, American mezzo-soprano, 52
  - Jack Smith, American singer, 92
- July 7
  - Syd Barrett, English singer, songwriter, guitarist and founding member of Pink Floyd, 60
  - Mícheál Ó Domhnaill, Irish singer and guitarist of The Bothy Band, 54
- July 8 – June Allyson, American actress, singer and dancer, 88
- July 9 – Milan Williams, American keyboardist of The Commodores, 58
- July 11 – Bill Miller, American jazz pianist, 91
- July 16 – Malachi Thompson, American jazz trumpeter, 56
- July 17
  - John G. Blowers, Jr., swing era drummer, 95
  - Sam Myers, American singer-songwriter, 70
- July 21 – Herbie Kalin, American singer, 72
- July 22 – Jessie Mae Hemphill, American singer-songwriter, 82
- July 23 – Bobby Paterson, Scottish pop rock bass guitarist of Love and Money
- July 30 – Anthony Galla-Rini, accordionist, composer, and conductor, 102
- July 31 – Rufus Harley, American jazz bagpiper, 70
- August 2 – Elisabeth Schwarzkopf, German operatic soprano, 90
- August 3 – Arthur Lee, American guitarist and vocalist of Love, 61
- August 11 – Mike Douglas, American singer and talk show host, 86
- August 16 – Jon Nödtveidt, Swedish singer of Dissection, 31
- August 17 – Walter Jagiello, polka musician, 76
- August 19 – Joseph Hill, Jamaican lead singer of roots reggae group Culture, 57
- August 21 – Ustad Bismillah Khan, Indian shehnai player, 90
- August 22 – Bruce Gary, American drummer of The Knack, 55
- August 24 – John Weinzweig, Canadian composer of classical music, 93
- August 27 – Jesse Pintado, Mexican-American guitarist with Napalm Death, 37
- August 28 – Pip Pyle, English drummer for Hatfield and the North, National Health and Gong, 56

=== September–October ===
- September 3 – Eva Knardahl, Norwegian classical pianist, 79
- September 4 – Astrid Varnay, Swedish operatic soprano, 88
- September 10 – Bennie Smith, American blues musician, 72
- September 13 – Lou Richards, American guitarist of Hatebreed, 35
- September 14 – Norman Brooks, Canadian singer, 78
- September 19 – Danny Flores, Mexican-American saxophonist of The Champs, 77
- September 20 – Armin Jordan, Swiss conductor, 74
- September 21 – Boz Burrell, English bass guitarist of Bad Company and King Crimson, 60
- September 23
  - Malcolm Arnold, English composer, 84
  - Etta Baker, American blues guitarist and singer, 93
- September 25 – Jamie Lyons, American rock singer (The Music Explosion), 57
- September 28 – Jan Werner Danielsen, Norwegian singer, 30
- September 30 – Isabel Bigley, American singer and actress, 78
- October 1 – Prentiss Barnes, American R & B singer, 81
- October 10 – Ed Summerlin, American composer, arranger, jazz saxophonist and music educator, 78
- October 14 – Freddy Fender, American singer, 69
- October 18 – Anna Russell, UK singer and comedian, 94
- October 21 – Sandy West, American drummer of The Runaways, 47
- October 23
  - Lebo Mathosa, singer, 29
  - Leonid Hambro, pianist, 86
- October 26 – Rogério Duprat, composer, 74

=== November–December ===
- November 1
  - Jason DiEmilio, guitarist (The Azusa Plane), 36
  - Buddy Killen, record producer and founder of Dial Records, 73
  - Silvio Varviso, conductor, 82
- November 3 – Paul Mauriat, orchestra leader, 81
- November 6 – Robert Jance Garfat (Dr Hook)
- November 8 – Basil Poledouris, film composer, 61
- November 10 – Gerald Levert, singer, 40
- November 17 – Ruth Brown, US singer, 78
- November 21 – Robert Lockwood, Jr., American blues guitarist, 91
- November 22 – John Allan Cameron, folk musician, 67
- November 23
  - Betty Comden, lyricist partner of Adolph Green, 89
  - Anita O'Day, jazz singer, 87
- November 24 – Juice Leskinen, Finnish singer-songwriter, 56
- November 25 – Valentín Elizalde, Mexican banda singer, 27
- November 30 – Shirley Walker, film composer, 61
- December 2 – Mariska Veres, singer with Shocking Blue, 59
- December 6 – Darren Brown, AKA Wiz, former frontman of Mega City Four, 44
- December 8 – Martha Tilton, American big band singer, 91
- December 9
  - Georgia Gibbs, American singer, 87
  - Freddie Marsden, drummer of Gerry & The Pacemakers
- December 11 – Homer Ledford, bluegrass musician, 79
- December 12 – Kenny Davern, American clarinet player and saxophonist, 71
- December 13 – Robert Long, singer and TV presenter, 63
- December 14
  - Ahmet Ertegün, co-founder of Atlantic Records, 83
  - Sivuca, Brazilian guitarist and accordionist, 76
- December 16 – Pnina Salzman, pianist, 84
- December 17 – Denis Payton, The Dave Clark Five, 63
- December 18
  - Scott Mateer, American songwriter and disk jockey, 46
  - Daniel Pinkham, American composer, 83
- December 22
  - Dennis Linde, Songwriter "Burnin' Love", "John Deere Green" and others, 63
  - Galina Ustvolskaya, Russian composer, 87
- December 24 – Kenneth Sivertsen, Norwegian guitarist and contemporary composer, 45
- December 25 – James Brown, American singer, 73
- December 27 – Pierre Delanoë, French lyricist, 88

== Awards ==
- ARIA Music Awards of 2006
- Grammy Awards of 2006
- 2006 Country Music Association Awards
- Eurovision Song Contest 2006
- Junior Eurovision Song Contest 2006
- 2006 BRIT Awards
- 2006 NME Awards
- 2006 World Music Awards
- 2006 MTV Video Music Awards
- Nationwide Mercury Prize 2006
- MTV Australia Video Music Awards
- MTV Europe Music Awards 2006

== See also ==
- 2006 in music (UK)
- Billboard's Top Hot 100 Hits of 2006
- 2006 in music (Switzerland)
- Record labels established in 2006
- Other events of 2006
- List of 'years in music'

== External charts ==
- Top 50 Albums For 2006 – Subculture Magazine UK
- Revolution 91.7's Top 30 Songs of 2006
- mxdwn.com's User-Submitted AOTY/SOTY 2006
- Open's Top 10 albums of 2006
