= Oceans (Morning Runner song) =

Single by Morning Runner

from the album Wilderness Is Paradise Now
- Released: 14 August 2006
- Recorded: 2005
- Genre: Rock
- Length: 3:42 (album version)
- Label: Parlophone; Faith & Hope
- Songwriters: Ali Clewer, Tom Derrett, Matthew Greener and Chris Wheatcroft
- Producer: John Cornfield

Morning Runner singles chronology
"The Great Escape" (2006)	"Oceans" (2006)

"Oceans" is a song by English rock band Morning Runner and was featured on their debut album, Wilderness Is Paradise Now. It was released on 14 August 2006 and was the band's final single (see 2006 in British music).

The song enjoyed some success on the radio, being made single of the week by Colin and Edith on BBC Radio 1 on 19 June 2006. In spite of this, it subsequently failed to gain enough airplay, and was reduced by the label from a CD and vinyl release to merely a vinyl release. The B-side planned to be on the CD version of the single, "When Your Watch Stops", was however still made available for download.

The music video for the single was shot in early June in New York City.

== Track listings ==
- Promo CD CDRDJ6701, released in early June 2006.
1. "Oceans" (radio edit)
2. "Oceans" (instrumental)
- 7" R6701, production of 1,000
1. "Oceans"
2. "Punching Walls" (2003 demo)
