= Wilderness Is Paradise Now =

Studio album by Morning Runner
- Released: 6 March 2006
- Recorded: Rockfield Studio, Monmouth and Sawmills Studio, Cornwall 2005
- Genre: Alternative rock
- Length: 42:47
- Labels: Parlophone, Faith & Hope
- Producer: John Cornfield

Morning Runner chronology
Drawing Shapes EP (2005)	Wilderness Is Paradise Now (2006)

Singles from Wilderness Is Paradise Now
- 1. "Gone Up in Flames" Released: 1 August 2005; 2. "Be All You Want Me to Be" Released: 24 October 2005; 3. "Have a Good Time" Released: 12 December 2005; 4. "Burning Benches" Released: 20 February 2006; 5. "The Great Escape" Released: 15 May 2006; 6. "Oceans" Released: 14 August 2006

Professional ratings
Review scores
Source	Rating
Clickmusic	link
Drowned In Sound	5/10 link
FHM	4/5 stars
Gigwise.com	link
The Guardian	link
NME	7/10
Q	3/5 stars
Room Thirteen	11/13 link
TheMusicZine	link
The Times	link

Wilderness Is Paradise Now was the debut and only album by Reading-based English rock band Morning Runner. Preceded by the release of single "Burning Benches", the album was released on 6 March 2006, and, despite failing to make a significant impact commercially, it gained generally favourable reviews.

== Track listing ==
All tracks written by Ali Clewer, Tom Derrett, Matthew Greener and Chris Wheatcroft.

1. "It's Not Like Everyone's My Friend" – 4:09
2. "Have a Good Time" – 3:44
3. "Gone Up in Flames" – 2:53
4. "Burning Benches" – 4:07
5. "Hold Your Breath" – 4:01
6. "Oceans" – 3:42
7. "The Great Escape" – 3:51
8. "Be All You Want Me to Be" – 4:41
9. "Punching Walls" – 4:04
10. "Work" – 4:02
11. "Best for You" – 3:33

=== Bonus tracks (Japan) ===
- "Can't Get It Right"
- "Them Folk" (from the Burning Benches UK single)
- "Burning Benches" (video) (from the Burning Benches UK single)

=== Conception ===
- "Gone up in Flames" contains three narratives: a racetrack loser, a devastated mourner, and a possessive consumer. "They are all pictures of desperation," explained lead singer Matthew Greener, "I got told this story about a woman so obsessed with this pearl that she sold all her possessions just to own it."
- "Burning Benches" was according to the band, not so much about love as it was about obsession. Greener said, "It sounded a bit too lovely, which is why we made it louder towards the end, we wanted to mess it up a bit." It was inspired by the surreal David Lynch horror film Eraserhead, in which the main character Henry Spencer watches and listens to the Lady in the Radiator sing about finding happiness in heaven.
- "Be All You Want Me to Be" was credited by Chris Martin as being inspiration for Coldplay's third album, X&Y. He said in NME, "I heard one of their songs called 'Be All You Want Me To Be' and I said, 'Fuck, that's better than most, no all, of our songs', and then it made us write a whole bunch of new tunes." Morning Runner supported Coldplay on some of their Twisted Logic Tour dates. The song was at one point considered not to be album material. "It's quite full-on and bold", stated pianist Chris "Fields" Wheatcroft, "We did struggle with where to put it on the album." However, it was decided that the song would be on the album "to bring it back up again", following the track "The Great Escape".
- "Punching Walls" was the first song that the band wrote. A demo version of the song was a B-side to 2006 single "Oceans".
- "Work" was written following Greener's father being made redundant.

== Naming of the album ==
The name of the album came from a romantic rhyme by Edward FitzGerald, translated from the Rubaiyat of Omar Khayyam:

Here with a Loaf of Bread beneath the Bough,
A Flask of Wine, a Book of Verse - and Thou
Beside me singing in the Wilderness -
And Wilderness is Paradise now.

Ali Clewer, the band's drummer, read the poem and believed it corresponded well with the album: "The poem describes a place that is a wilderness becoming paradise because of the person who is keeping you company," Clewer explained, "a kind of optimism that seemed to resonate with many of the ideas on the album."

== Cover art ==
The album's cover art was designed by Tappin Gofton, who created the cover for Coldplay's third album, X&Y, and The Chemical Brothers' Push the Button.

The artwork was inspired by a small collection of Victorian book illustrations. The kind of imagery that Tappin Gofton were looking at in these old volumes was noticeably decorative, with many of the pieces displaying strong narrative themes, and it was these two distinct elements that formed the foundations for their ideas. Once they had agreed on the overall thematic look for the covers and a set of ideas for each release, they commissioned the illustrator Kam Tang, who they collaborated with to produce the drawings for the artwork.

== Critical reaction ==
The album was generally seen as a strong debut by critics on release. On the negative side, the band suffered occasional accusations that they were too similar to other piano-driven bands, such as Coldplay and Keane; The Guardian's Caroline Sullivan talking of Morning Runner filling a "vacancy for a new Coldplay". However, some critics refuted these, with NME's Paul McNamee saying "they're a band that could knock 10 bells out of Keane" and Phil Mongredien of Q stating that a Coldplay comparison "would be doing Morning Runner a disservice." Mike Pattenden from The Times said that it was the band's slower tracks which suggested that "Morning Runner are in it for the long haul." However, the group disbanded in October 2007 before they could release a second album.

== Release details ==
Country	Date	Label	Format	Catalog
United Kingdom	6 March 2006	Parlophone Faith & Hope	CD	356 0972
Japan	15 March 2006	Toshiba-EMI	CD	TOCP-66498
