= 2006 in Irish music =

This is a summary of the year 2006 in the Irish music industry.

== Summary ==
=== January ===
- January 4 saw the 20th anniversary of the death of Phil Lynott, lead vocalist of legendary Irish rock band Thin Lizzy.

=== February ===
- U2 dominated the 2006 Meteor Awards held on February 2, winning three awards; Best Irish Band, Best Irish Album (for How to Dismantle an Atomic Bomb) and Best Live Performance (for their Croke Park gigs as part of their Vertigo Tour in 2005).
- February 20 saw the official announcement of the first acts that would perform at Oxegen 2006. These included The Who, Red Hot Chili Peppers, The Strokes, Arctic Monkeys, Franz Ferdinand and Kaiser Chiefs.
- The first annual Choice Music Prize was awarded to Julie Feeney's album 13 Songs at Vicar Street on February 28, 2006.

=== March ===
- American singer-songwriter, Josh Ritter, popular with Irish audiences, collapsed whilst performing on stage at An Grianán Theatre in Letterkenny on March 7. Fears that he would be unable to complete his Irish tour proved unfounded and Ritter returned to finish his Letterkenny show on September 4, playing a second gig there the following night. Later (Thursday September 6, 2007), whilst appearing on Rick O'Shea's show on 2fm, he commented: "If there's one thing I've learned it's to not eat Chinese food in Letterkenny."

=== May ===
- On May 1, Snow Patrol's internationally anticipated fourth album Eyes Open was released. It spawned a number of hits including "Chasing Cars", which gained significant popularity in the United States after being featured on the popular medical drama Grey's Anatomy.
- On Friday May 26, it was confirmed by Slane Castle and music promoters MCD that no concert would take place at the venue this year as a suitable act could not be found. It was the first time since the mid-1990s that it has not taken place in consecutive years, with Eminem having pulled out in 2005. Lord Henry Mountcharles had targeted American rock group Green Day as his preferred headline act, but the Californian band were not touring in 2006. He had this to say: "There was no big band that could do it. The acts are not available."

=== June ===
- On Friday June 9, Guns N' Roses made their first Irish appearance since May 1992, when they played the RDS Arena with support from Mötley Crüe.

=== July ===
- Oxegen 2006 got under way on the weekend of Saturday July 8 and Sunday July 9 and was memorable for hosting The Who's first Irish performance in 35 years, the Irish debut of Arctic Monkeys, James Brown's final Irish festival performance whilst alive and the Red Hot Chili Peppers fourth performance in Ireland in five summers.

=== August ===
- This was the month that saw the addition of a brand new festival to the Irish music spectrum. On Saturday August 5 and Sunday August 6 Hi:Fi Ireland took place in Belvedere House, near Mullingar in County Westmeath. It was headlined by Razorlight, The Streets, The Prodigy, Ian Brown, Mylo, Paul Oakenfold and Audio Bullys.
- On the same weekend, Indie-pendence 06 took place in New Square in Mitchelstown, County Cork. It was a two-day affair, headlined by The Proclaimers, The Sultans Of Ping FC and The Frank and Walters. Wicklow-based electronica group Hybrasil also played at the festival.
- Forfey Festival in Northern Ireland had its first outing, in Enniskillen over 24–26 August. Featured Irish acts included Foy Vance, Sixstarhotel, Mojo Fury and We Are Knives.
- August also saw a host of concerts staged in Dublin's Marlay Park as part of the second year of Bud Rising's summer shows; Radiohead, Snow Patrol, Morrissey, Daft Punk, Faithless with special guests Kasabian (Thursday August 17), The Dandy Warhols, The Magic Numbers and Beck were among the performers.

=== September ===
- On Friday September 1, the newly extended three-day Electric Picnic got under way in Stradbally, County Laois. The festival was as usual broadcast on RTÉ 2fm but for the first time ever it was also broadcast on RTÉ television, where a large part of the Saturday and Sunday schedule of RTÉ Two was taken up by the coverage, presented by Tom Dunne and Jenny Huston.

=== October ===
- The inaugural Heinken Green Synergy Festival took place from October 4–8 in various clubs, bars and venues in Dublin City Centre. Performing acts included The Sunshine Underground, Giveamanakick, Ghostface Killah, Messiah J & The Expert, as well as The Fall, Fujiya & Miyagi, The Congos and Nouvelle Vague.

=== November ===
- On Friday November 3, a group of largely Irish musical artists release an album The Cake Sale for the charity Oxfam and the Ireland Make Trade Fair campaign. They were formed by Brian Crosby of Bell X1, and other contributing artists included Crosby's bandmates Paul Noonan and David Geraghty, Glen Hansard of The Frames, Damien Rice, Lisa Hannigan, Neil Hannon, Gemma Hayes and Snow Patrol's Gary Lightbody.
- Just three days later, on Monday November 6, the U2/Green Day duet "The Saints Are Coming" was released. A music video for the song, directed by Chris Milk, was released on video site YouTube on Friday October 27, 2006. The music video showed the two bands playing at the Abbey Road Studio and at the Louisiana Superdome (though the footage from the live performance at the Superdome was overdubbed with the studio version of the song), intermixed with news footage of the displacement of residents after Hurricane Katrina in New Orleans. The second half of the video showed an alternate history in which George W. Bush redeployed troops and vehicles from Iraq to New Orleans to help victims of the hurricane, with the military personnel fulfilling the titular role of the "saints." The video had more than two million views on YouTube five days after its initial upload. The single received a Grammy nomination for "Best Rock Performance By A Duo Or Group".
- On Friday November 17, U2's compilation album U218 Singles was released. The track listing had been announced on Friday November 3.

=== December ===
- On Saturday December 9, U2 played the final date of their Vertigo Tour in Honolulu, Hawaii. After the show, U2 manager Paul McGuinness announced that the band were planning to release their new album by late 2007.
- On Thursday December 21, Bell X1 announced that they would be playing Malahide Castle in Dublin on Saturday June 30, 2007, and then Live at the Marquee in Cork on Sunday July 1, 2007.
- On Saturday 23 December, news broke that Bono was to receive an honorary British knighthood from Elizabeth II for his humanitarian work and contribution to music. He was eventually presented with the award by the British ambassador to Ireland on Thursday 29 March 2007.

== Bands formed ==
- Fight Like Apes

== Bands disbanded ==
- JJ72 (June 22)
- Turn

== Bands reformed ==
- Horslips
- The Stunning

== Albums & EPs ==
A total of 180 Irish albums were released in 2006.

Below is a list of notable albums & EPs released by Irish artists in Ireland in 2006.

- Aaagh! – Republic of Loose (April 7, 2006)
- Eyes Open – Snow Patrol (May 9, 2006)
- Victory for the Comic Muse – The Divine Comedy (June 19, 2006)
- Tremors – Humanzi (July 21, 2006)
- Not Fade Away – David Kitt (August 18, 2006)
- Neosupervital – Neosupervital (September 1, 2006)
- Boss Volenti – Boss Volenti (September 8, 2006)
- The Cost – The Frames (September 22, 2006)
- Songs from the Deep Forest – Duke Special (October 2006)
- We Thrive on Big Cities – Director (October 6, 2006)
- The Art of Insincerity – Royseven (October 20, 2006)
- Trouble Pilgrim – The Radiators (October 26, 2006)
- A Public Display of Affection – The Blizzards (October 27, 2006)
- The Cake Sale – The Cake Sale (November 3, 2006)
- 9 – Damien Rice (November 3, 2006)
- U218 Singles – U2 (November 17, 2006)

Release date unknown

- Adventures in Gramophone – Duke Special (??? 2006)
- A Moment of Stillness – God Is an Astronaut (??? 2006) (EP)
- In Towers and Clouds – The Immediate (Summer 2006)
- Now This I Have To Hear – Messiah J and the Expert (??? 2006)

== Singles ==
Below is a list of notable singles released by Irish artists in Ireland in 2006.

Issue date	Song title	Artist	Source	Sales	Notes
13 February	"Long Time Coming"	Humanzi			
__ February	"Deeper Than Deep"	Boss Volenti			
20 February	"St. Christopher"	Ham Sandwich			
13 March	"Flame"	Bell X1			
	"Trouble"	The Blizzards			
24 April	"Reconnect"	Director			
24 April	"You're All I Have"	Snow Patrol			
May	"The Rules"	Delorentos			
June	"Ain't No Use"	Boss Volenti			
	"One is Fun"	The Aftermath			
12 June	"Diva Lady"	The Divine Comedy			
17 July	"Diet Pills & Magazines"	Humanzi			
24 July	"Chasing Cars"	Snow Patrol			
7 August	"Portrait"	Duke Special			
14 August	"To Die a Virgin"	The Divine Comedy			
	"Say No More"	David Kitt			
18 August	"Miss Fantasia Preaches"	The Blizzards			
28 August	"Rocky Took a Lover"	Bell X1			
1 September	"Falling Slowly/No More I Love Yous"	The Frames			
September	"Older"	Royseven			
29 September	"Come With a Friend"	Director			
13 October	"War of Words"	The Blizzards			
16 October	"Last Night I Nearly Died (But I Woke Up Just in Time)"	Duke Special			
27 October	"Out On a Wire"	Humanzi			
27 October	"The People"	Travega			
November	"Words"	Ham Sandwich			
6 November	"The Saints Are Coming"	U2 (with Green Day)			
13 November	"Set the Fire to the Third Bar"	Snow Patrol			
27 November	"9 Crimes"	Damien Rice feat. Lisa Hannigan			
8 December	"Tinsel and Marzipan"	Pugwash and Friends			

Release date unknown

- "Undercover" – Gemma Hayes (??? 2006)
- "Something Outta Nothing" – Messiah J and the Expert (??? 2006)
- "When The Bull Gores The Matador" – Messiah J and the Expert (??? 2006)

== Festivals ==
=== Oxegen 2006 ===
- Oxegen 2006 took place at Punchestown Racecourse in County Kildare on Saturday July 8 and Sunday July 9. It was headlined by The Who, Red Hot Chili Peppers, The Strokes, Arctic Monkeys, Franz Ferdinand and Kaiser Chiefs.

=== Electric Picnic 2006 ===
- Electric Picnic 2006 took place in Stradbally Estate, County Laois from Friday September 1 until Sunday September 3. It was headlined by Pet Shop Boys, Basement Jaxx, Massive Attack, Bloc Party, The Frames, Gary Numan and Damien Rice.

=== Hi:Fi Ireland ===
- Hi:Fi Ireland took place in Belvedere House, near Mullingar in County Westmeath on Saturday August 5 and Sunday August 6. It was headlined by Razorlight, The Streets, The Prodigy, Ian Brown, Mylo, Paul Oakenfold and Audio Bullys.

=== Heineken Green Energy ===
The 11th Heineken Green Energy Festival at Dublin Castle was headlined by Snow Patrol who played on April 29. Richard Hawley also played that day. The 2006 event also saw Ian Brown and Republic of Loose on April 30 whilst Kaiser Chiefs and Graham Coxon finished off the festival on May 1. With many other acts playing around the city during the weekend as part of the "gig trail/fringe" (i.e. the other music venues around the city), Dublin once again became an international music centre for the duration of the festival.

=== Garden Party 2006 ===
- The Garden Party took place at Ballinlough Castle in Athboy, County Meath on Sunday June 4. Amongst the acts to play were The Orb, 2 Many DJs, Buck 65, Asian Dub Foundation and Neosupervital.

=== Indie-pendence 06 ===
- Indie-pendence 06 was a two-day affair taking place in New Square in Mitchelstown, County Cork on Saturday August 5 and Sunday August 6. It was headlined by The Proclaimers, The Sultans Of Ping FC and The Frank and Walters. Hybrasil also played at the festival.

=== Bud Rising ===
Bud Rising Spring, Bud Rising Summer and Bud Rising Winter took place in 2006 and as ever both were spread across a vast variety of venues.

- Bud Rising Spring saw Razorlight performing the Olympia Theatre on April 17, with The Marshals in support.
- August saw a host of concerts staged in Dublin's Marlay Park as part of the second year of Bud Rising's Summer shows; Radiohead, Snow Patrol, Morrissey, Daft Punk, Faithless, Kasabian, The Dandy Warhols, The Magic Numbers and Beck were among the performers.
  - Faithless played Marlay Park on Thursday August 17 with special guests Kasabian.
- Bud Rising Winter took place in Dublin and lasted for 7 days from Monday November 6 until Sunday November 12. Included in the festival line-up were the Irish debuts of Cansei de Ser Sexy (November 6 in The Village) and TV on the Radio (November 7 in Templebar Music Centre), and the event was also headlined by Primal Scream (November 11 in the Olympia Theatre), Brian Jonestown Massacre (November 12 in the Ambassador Theatre) and newcomers Tapes 'n Tapes. Playing on November 7 in The Village were The Spinto Band, while The Futureheads played the Ambassador and Gnarls Barkley in Vicar Street the following night.

=== Download Festival ===
- Download Festival Ireland hosted a two-day event at the RDS Showgrounds in Dublin in 2006, headlined by metal acts Guns N' Roses and Metallica.

=== Live at the Marquee ===
- Live at the Marquee 2006 took place in the Cork Showgrounds between June and July. Headlining acts included Bob Dylan, Roger Waters, The Frames and Des Bishop.

=== Slane 2006 ===
- Slane 2006 was cancelled after a failure to find a suitable headline act. It was the first time since the mid-1990s that it has not taken place in consecutive years, with Eminem having pulled out in 2005. Lord Henry Mountcharles had targeted American rock group Green Day as his preferred headline act, but the Californian band were not touring in 2006. Lord Henry had this to say: "There was no big band that could do it. The acts are not available."

== Music awards ==
=== 2006 Meteor Awards ===
The 2006 Meteor Awards were held on February 2, 2006. Below are the winners:

Award	Winner(s)
Best Irish Male	Damien Dempsey
Best Irish Female	Gemma Hayes
Best Irish Band	U2
Best Irish Album	How to Dismantle an Atomic Bomb (U2)
Best New Irish Act	Humanzi
Best Irish Pop Act	Westlife
Best Live Performance	U2 (Croke Park 2005)
Best Irish DJ	Ray D'Arcy
Hope for 2006	Laura Izibor
Best Folk/Traditional	John Spillane
Best International Male	Kanye West
Best International Female	Gwen Stefani
Best International Band	Kaiser Chiefs
Best International Album	Employment (Kaiser Chiefs)
Industry Award	Bill Whelan
Lifetime Achievement Award	The Pogues
Humanitarian Award	Father Peter McVerry

=== Choice Music Prize ===
The Choice Music Prize for Irish Album of the Year 2005 was awarded at Vicar Street to Julie Feeney for her album 13 Songs on February 28, 2006.

== See also ==
- 2006 in Swiss music
