= Burning Benches =

- 2-track CD cover

Single by Morning Runner

from the album Wilderness Is Paradise Now
- B-side: "Them Folk"
- Released: 20 February 2006
- Genre: Rock
- Length: 4:08 (radio edit)
- Label: Parlophone; Faith & Hope
- Songwriter(s): Ali Clewer, Tom Derrett, Matthew Greener and Chris Wheatcroft
- Producer(s): John Cornfield

Morning Runner singles chronology
"Have a Good Time" (2005)	"Burning Benches" (2006)	"The Great Escape" (2006)

Alternative cover
- Maxi-CD cover

"Burning Benches" is a song by English rock band Morning Runner and was the fourth track on their 2006 debut album Wilderness Is Paradise Now. The song was also released as the lead single from that album on 20 February 2006, peaking at #19 in the UK Singles Chart (see 2006 in British music).

The single enjoyed a large amount of success on the radio, reaching the BBC Radio 1 B List, as well as being made single of the week by Steve Lamacq, Scott Mills, and Colin and Edith.

The song was, according to the band, not so much about love as it was about obsession. Lead singer Matthew Greener said, "It sounded a bit too lovely, which is why we made it louder towards the end, we wanted to mess it up a bit." It was inspired by the surreal David Lynch horror film Eraserhead, in which the main character Henry Spencer watches and listens to the Lady in the Radiator sing about finding happiness in heaven.

== Track listings ==
- 7" R6683
1. "Burning Benches" (radio edit) - 4:08
2. "People Line Up the Halls" (demo) - 4:25
- CD CDR6683
1. "Burning Benches" (radio edit) - 4:08
2. "Them Folk" - 2:53
- Maxi-CD CDRS6683
1. "Burning Benches" (radio edit) - 4:08
2. "Them Folk" - 2:53
3. "Burning Benches" (acoustic) - 4:06
4. "Burning Benches" (video)

== Music video ==
The official music video depicts in reverse motion the band members trapped and drowning in a water-filled lift. As it is played in reverse, the video starts with their bodies underwater, their panic decreasing as the water level falls, their vain attempt to pry the door open, a leak starting, a floor button being pressed and ends with their walking into the lift.

== Uses in other media ==
In 2007 the song was used as part of the Adidas 'Impossible is Nothing' advertising campaign.
