= Gone Up in Flames =

Single by Morning Runner

from the album Wilderness Is Paradise Now
- B-side: "Leave Me Alone"
- Released: 1 August 2005
- Recorded: 2005
- Genre: Rock
- Length: 2:55
- Label: Parlophone; Faith & Hope
- Songwriters: Ali Clewer, Tom Derrett, Matthew Greener, Chris Wheatcroft
- Producers: John Cornfield, Graeme Moorcraft, Rik Simpson, Morning Runner

Morning Runner singles chronology
"Gone Up in Flames" (2005)	"Be All You Want Me to Be" (2005)

"Gone Up in Flames" is the debut single by English rock band Morning Runner, from their debut studio album, Wilderness Is Paradise Now. The song was first released on 1 August 2005 and reached number 39 in the UK Singles Chart. The song contains three narratives: a racetrack loser, a devastated mourner, and a possessive consumer. Lead singer Matthew Greener explained, "They are all pictures of desperation. I got told this story about a woman so obsessed with this pearl that she sold all her possessions just to own it."

The song features on the soundtrack of the video game FIFA 07. An instrumental version is the main theme tune to the BAFTA Award-winning sitcom The Inbetweeners and features in the end credits of the series' film adaptation and its sequel.

== Track listings ==
- 7" R6669
1. "Gone Up in Flames" - 2:55
2. "Leave Me Alone" - 2:43
- Maxi-CD CDRS6669
1. "Gone Up in Flames" - 2:55
2. "Leave Me Alone" - 2:43
3. "Work" (acoustic) - 4:11
4. "Gone Up in Flames" (video)
