= 1927 in Norwegian music =

The following is a list of notable events and releases of the year 1927 in Norwegian music.

== Deaths ==
June

- 17 – Ole Olsen, organist, composer, conductor and military musician (born 1850).

== Births ==
January

- 8 – Nils Grinde, organist, musicologist, and theatre historian (died 2012)

May

- 10 – Eva Knardahl, classical pianist (died 2006).

June

- 13 – Knut Wiggen, composer (died 2016).
- 18 – Kjell Lund, architect, songwriter and singer (died 2013).

November

- 8 – Ingrid Bjoner, operatic soprano (died 2006).
- 30 – Alfred Næss, playwright and songwriter (died 1997).

December

- 9 – Øistein "Tinka" Ringstad, jazz pianist and vibraphonist (died 1991).

== See also ==
- 1927 in Norway
- Music of Norway
