= 2006 in Swiss music =

2006 was an important year for Swiss music, with the first few months of the year seeing a very steady pattern at the top end of the Swiss singles and album charts.

== Chart summary ==
The first Swiss Top 100 Singles Chart number one of 2006 was Madonna's "Hung Up", the first single releases from her Confessions on a Dance Floor album (which itself had been number one in November 2005, and started the year at number two). "Hung Up" had been number since November 20, 2005 already and started the year with its seventh week at number one. The first album chart number one was Robbie Williams' Intensive Care, again a continuation from the previous year.

January 8 would bring the first new number one of 2006, in "Big City Life" by Mattafix. "Big City Life" had already been on the chart since October, ending 2005 at number two in the chart. Mattafix and Robbie Williams would see out January topping their respective charts. Meanwhile, the confirmed Swiss Eurovision Song Contest 2006 entrant Six4one announced during January that their song for the contest will be "If We All Give A Little", although no extra information about the song was given at the time.

February 5 seen the first new album chart number one of the year, with James Blunt's Back To Bedlam album climbing back to the top, having been there for four weeks the previous year. Having been on the chart since June 19, Back To Bedlam has become one of the 200 most successful albums of all time in Switzerland.

On February 12 Mattafix would finally fall off the top of the singles chart, with Eros Ramazzotti and Anastacia's duet "I Belong To You (Il Ritmo Della Passione)" taking over, having entered at No. 2 a week earlier. The duet is the third Swiss singles number one for both Ramazzotti and Anastacia. As of the chart week ending February 26, Ramazzotti and Anastacia still lie at number one in the singles chart, and James Blunt lies number one in the album chart (with his second album release, the live compilation Chasing Time: The Bedlam Sessions, at number two).

Despite the consistency at the top of the chart thus far in 2006, the Swiss singles chart has seen a lot of popular acts pass through it. Normally in the first two months of the year the chart would be mostly quiet, but the top ten has been fairly active, with acts including US5, 50 Cent, Ch!pz and Mary J. Blige entering toward the higher end of the chart this year.

== Swiss charts ==
Week Starting	Top 100 Singles #1		Top 100 Albums #1		Top 100 Singles Highest N.E.
January 1	Madonna	"Hung Up"	Robbie Williams	Intensive Care	Eminem	"When I'm Gone" (#15)
January 8	Mattafix	"Big City Life"	Robbie Williams	Intensive Care	Clémence	"Sans Défense" (#62)
January 15	Mattafix	"Big City Life"	Robbie Williams	Intensive Care	Mylène Farmer	"Redonne-Moi" (#31)
January 22	Mattafix	"Big City Life"	Robbie Williams	Intensive Care	Mary J. Blige	"Be Without You" (#8)
January 29	Mattafix	"Big City Life"	Robbie Williams	Intensive Care	Sean Paul	"Ever Blazin'" (#11)
February 5	Mattafix	"Big City Life"	James Blunt	Back To Bedlam	Eros Ramazzotti and Anastacia	"I Belong To You (Il Ritmo Della Passione)" (#2)
February 12	Eros Ramazzotti and Anastacia	"I Belong To You (Il Ritmo Della Passione)"	James Blunt	Back To Bedlam	Ch!pz	"1001 Arabian Nights" (#4)
February 19	Eros Ramazzotti and Anastacia	"I Belong To You (Il Ritmo Della Passione)"	James Blunt	Back To Bedlam	50 Cent	"Hustler's Ambition" (#10)
February 26	Eros Ramazzotti and Anastacia	"I Belong To You (Il Ritmo Della Passione)"	James Blunt	Back To Bedlam	US5	"Come Back To Me Baby" (#4)

== See also ==
- 2006 in music
- 2006 in British music
- 2006 in Irish music
- 2006 in Norwegian music
- 2006 in South Korean music
- 2006 in country music
- 2006 in classical music
- 2006 in heavy metal music
- 2006 in hip hop music
- 2006 in jazz
- 2006 in Latin music
- Six4one
