= Be All You Want Me to Be =

Single by Morning Runner

from the album Wilderness Is Paradise Now
- B-side: "Frayed Edges"
- Released: 24 October 2005
- Recorded: 2005
- Genre: Rock
- Length: 3:50
- Label: Parlophone; Faith & Hope
- Songwriter(s): Ali Clewer, Tom Derrett, Matthew Greener, Chris Wheatcroft
- Producer(s): John Cornfield, Graerne Moorcroft, Morning Runner

Morning Runner singles chronology
"Gone up in Flames" (2005)	"Be All You Want Me to Be" (2005)	"Have a Good Time" (2005)

"Be All You Want Me to Be" is a song by English rock band Morning Runner and was featured on their debut album, Wilderness Is Paradise Now. It was released 24 October 2005 as the band's second single, charting at #44 in the UK Singles Chart (see 2005 in British music).

The song has been credited by Chris Martin as being inspiration for Coldplay's third album, X&Y. He said in NME, "I heard one of their songs called 'Be All You Want Me To Be' and I said, 'Fuck, that's better than most, no all, of our songs', and then it made us write a whole bunch of new tunes."

== Track listings ==
- 7" R6674
1. "Be All You Want Me to Be" (radio edit) - 3:50
2. "You Tell Me I'm Awake"
- 7" R6674X, CD CDR6674
1. "Be All You Want Me to Be" (radio edit) - 3:50
2. "Frayed Edges" - 3:02
