= Kam Tang =

Kam Tang is an illustrator living and working in Brixton, London. His work is described as maximalist. After earning his degree from the University of Brighton he went on to do a masters at the Royal College of Art. Since graduating he has worked as a freelance creative. His first major commission was for GTF (Graphic Thought Facility), who called upon him to illustrate the journey from start to finish of a Royal College of Art student for the RCA prospectus. He has since worked for many editorial publications such as The Guardian, Wired, Arena, and more recently Wallpaper* magazine, where his intricate and highly detailed 'Navigator' maps have been a regular feature.

Kam has also designed and created images for many music campaigns, which have included work for Merz, Athlete, Gnarls Barkley, Morning Runner, Two Culture Clash and more recently The Chemical Brothers.

Besides editorial and music work, Kam's work has appeared on a much larger scale having been involved in advertising campaigns for Adidas, Nike and Sony. His designs have recently applied into commercial space for Quick restaurants (France), Burberry (Milan) and more noticeably London's Design Museum, collaborating again with GTF to create drawings for the new identity.

He continues to work as a freelancer in London.
