= Olga (opera) =

Opera by Jorge Antunes

- Opera by Jorge Antunes
- Librettist: Gerson Valle
- Based on: Life of Olga Benário Prestes
- Premiere: October 14, 2006; Theatro Municipal, São Paulo, Brazil

Olga is an opera in three-acts and eight scenes in singspiel form composed by Jorge Antunes with a libretto by Gerson Valle. It premiered at Theatro Municipal of São Paulo on October 14, 2006. It is based on the life of Olga Benário Prestes.

== Development ==
Antunes began working on the piece in 1997.

== Production history ==
In 2018, a cinematic adaptation of the opera was announced.

The opera was performed by Poland's Baltic State Opera during its 2019-2020 season.
