= Rohan Kriwaczek =

British musician

Rohan Kriwaczek is an English writer, composer and violinist. He studied under Peter Maxwell Davies, Oliver Knussen and Judith Weir, and has written classical works, scores for theatre, TV, and radio. He worked with Ken Campbell in 1995 on a BBC Radio 3 Studio 3 programme.

He is the author of the 2006 book An Incomplete History of the Art of Funerary Violin, which purports to document this musical genre and contains numerous musical examples in score.
