= Messiah J and the Expert =

Irish Musicians

Messiah J & The Expert
- Origin: Dublin, Ireland
- Genres: Hip hop Indie; Reggae; Funk
- Years active: 2002 – 2010
- Label: Inaudible Recordings
- Members: Messiah J The Expert

Messiah J & The Expert were a rapper/producer duo based in Dublin, Ireland.

== Career ==
=== The Stonecutters and Creative Controle ===
They originally met at a Scratch Perverts instore in 1999 and became part of a seven-strong collective, The Stonecutters. The Stonecutters consisted of Messiah J, The Expert, Robbie Delaney, DJ Splyce, Relevance, Grammar and DJ Mayhem. They practised and wrote weekly in impromptu surroundings including Harold's Cross Racetrack and Raheny Dart Station. They recorded what is considered to be THE lost Irish Hip-Hop album called 'Please Daddy, Don't!'. Due to infighting the album never saw the light of day but is believed to contain an early version of 'Year of the Genie' which came out on 2008's 'From The Word Go'. Alongside, DJ Mayhem, they formed Creative Controle. A four-track demo soon made its way into the hands of No Disco presenter Leagues O'Toole who released their first two singles ("Bloodrush"/"The Dose" and "Check the Vision") on his label, Volta Records (co-owned by Dave O'Grady).

=== What's Confusing You? (2003–2006) ===
In 2002, Messiah J & The Expert opted to continue as a two-piece and shortly after changed their name. Their first release under the name Messiah J & The Expert, the single "First place", was released in September 2003, quickly followed by their debut album, What's Confusing You?. The album included "Bloodrush" and "Check the Vision" which had originally been released by Creative Controle. This incarnation of the band featured DJ Flip and K-Why in their live line-up but by June 2004, the live line-up consisted of Messiah J, The Expert, The Twiddler on bass and G-bone on guitar. They played their last gig of that year in June supporting The Streets in Dublin Castle. They have, over the years, also supported Public Enemy, Gangstarr, De La Soul, Jurassic 5, Wyclef Jean, Buck 65, The Pharcyde, El-P, Jeru The Damaja and others. In 2005, they recorded a session for Steve Lamacq who had heard their demo, Something Outta Nothing, a track that was included on their yet-to-be-finished second album. This also led to plays by other BBC Radio 1 DJs. In March 2006, they released a 12" featuring New York rapper, C-Rayz Walz, entitled When the Bull Gores the Matador on their own label, Inaudible Records.

=== Now This I Have To Hear (2006–2008) ===
In October 2006, Messiah J & The Expert released the album, Now This I Have To Hear, which was nominated for the Choice Music Prize in January 2007. The album was preceded that September by the release of "Something Outta Nothing", featuring Leda Egri on vocals. The tracks, "Place Your Bets" and "All The Other Girls" were released as singles. A low-key tour mini-album compiling five new tracks and five previously released b-sides, ...And Another Thing was released in 2007. In October 2007, a download-only single, "Superfamous Supertune" was made available from their official website.

=== From The Word Go (2008–2010) ===
Messiah J & The Expert released their third album, From The Word Go, through Inaudible Recordings in October 2008. Assembled between 2006 and 2008 in their own Labbey Road studio, it features collaborations with singers Leda Egri, Joanne Daly and Ro and Kieran from Delorentos. Messiah J reflects:

"It has loads of strings and horns on it and it's pretty catchy. It's ballsier, riskier, less cluttered, simpler and definitely more eclectic than any of our previous records. The Expert's music is extremely varied. It has bits of indie, reggae, funk, four to the floor dance, psych and 'theme-tune-walk-in-the-ring' hip hop."

The full track-listing is: 'Year of the Genie', 'Megaphone Man', 'Keep The Noise Down', 'Turn The Magic On', 'Tomorrow Is Too Late', 'Jean Is Planning An Escape', 'Guess You Had To Be There', 'Geography', 'Panic Station', 'Amnesia Comes Easily', 'Looking for a Long Term Thing' and 'The Predicament'.

From the Word Go was nominated for Meteor album of the year award of 2008. Lead single, 'Megaphone Man' reached No. 14 in the Icelandic charts.

They played the Electric Picnic festival in September 2010 which was their last gig before pausing the MJEX project.

== Awards and nominations ==
In 2007, they were nominated to the 2006 Choice Music Prize nominated

== Discography ==
=== Studio albums ===
Year	Album details	Peak chart positions
Year	Album details	IRL
2003	What's Confusing You?: Released: 2003; Label: Volta; Formats: CD	—
2006	Now This I Have To Hear: Released: 2006; Label: Inaudible; Formats: CD	83
2008	From The Word Go: Released: 2008; Label: Inaudible; Formats: CD, Download	66
"—" denotes releases that did not chart.
