= 2006 in Norwegian music =

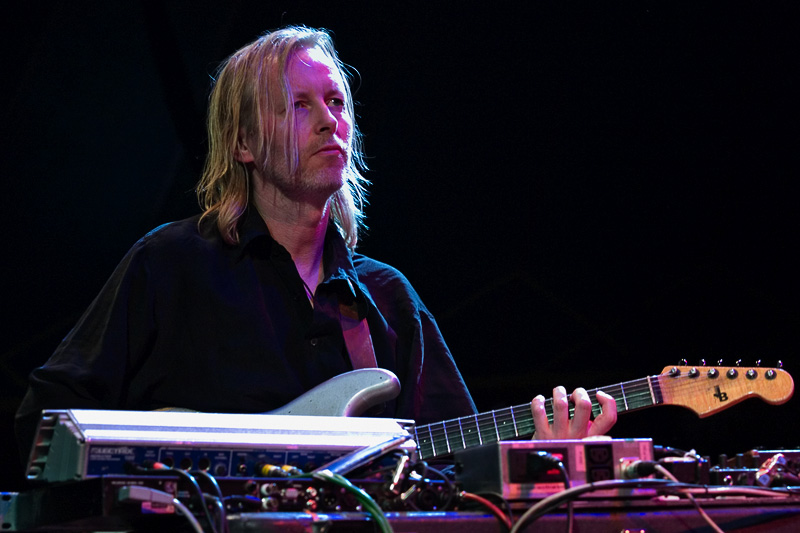
Eivind Aarset at the Moers Festival.

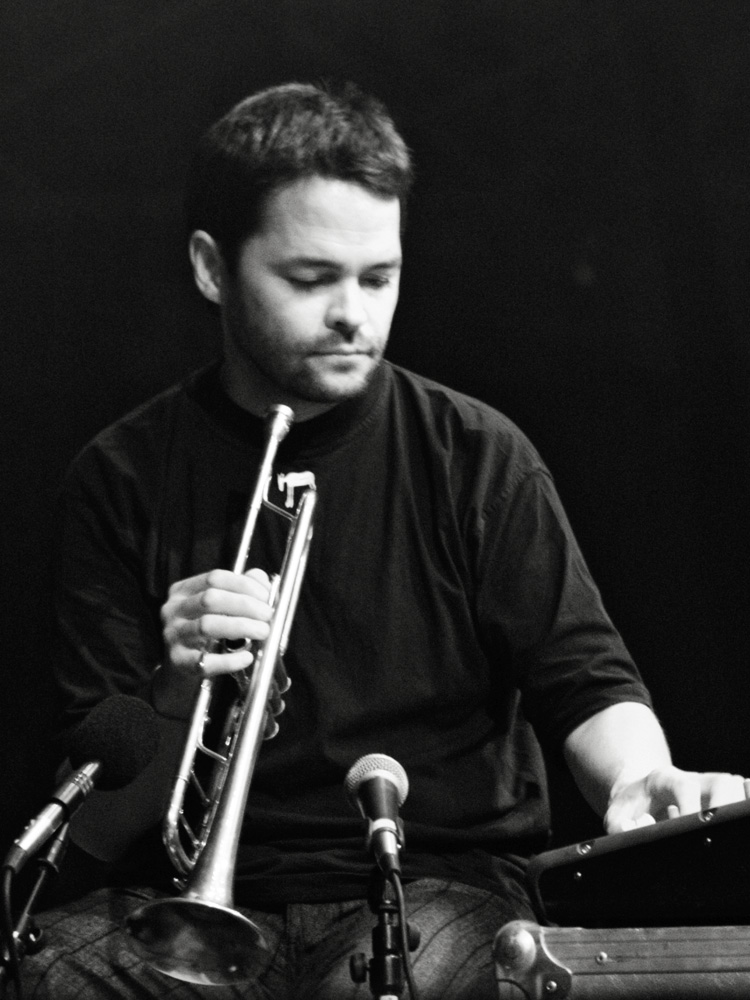
Arve Henriksen at the Moers Festival.

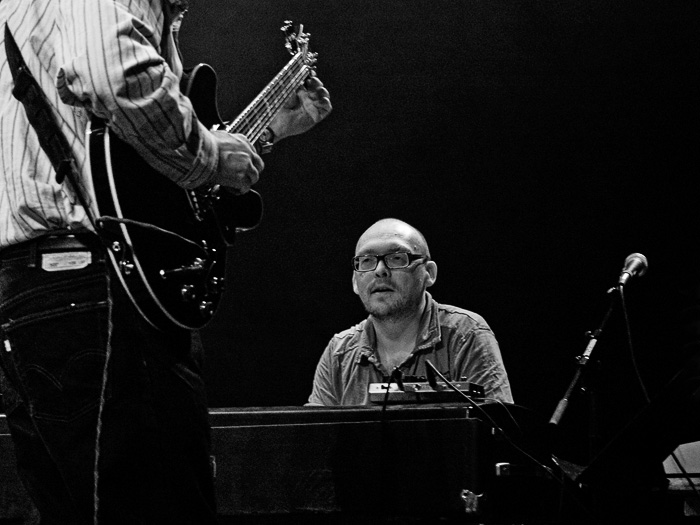
Bugge Wesseltoft at the Moers Festival.

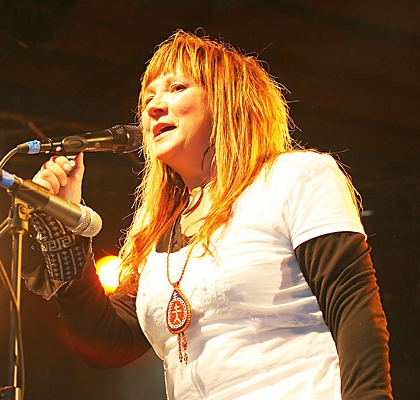
Mari Boine at Riddu Riđđu.

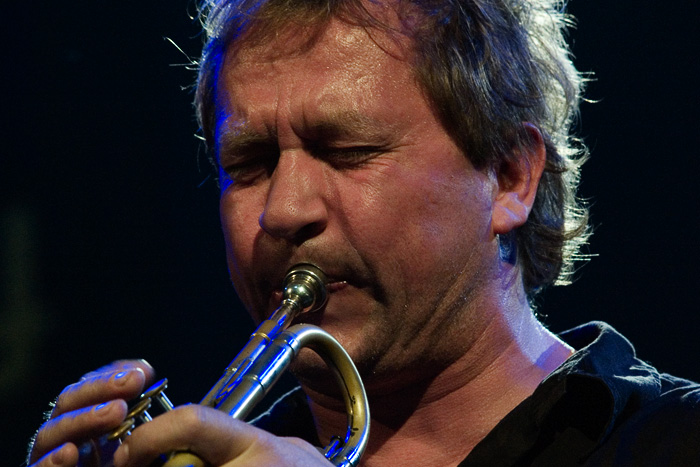
Nils Petter Molvaer at the Moers Festival.

The following is a list of notable events and releases of the year 2006 in Norwegian music.

== Events ==
=== January ===
- 13 – The very first Ice Music Festival Festival started in Geilo, Norway (January 13–15).
- 26 – The 9th Polarjazz Festival started in Longyearbyen, Svalbard (January 26–28).

=== February ===
- 2 – Kristiansund Opera Festival opened (February 2–18).

=== April ===
- 7
  - The 33rd Vossajazz started at Vossavangen (April 7 – 9).
  - Yngve Moe was awarded Vossajazzprisen 2006.
- 8 – Trygve Seim performs the commissioned work Reiser for Vossajazz 2006.
- 28 – Bergenfest started in Bergen (April 28 – May 6).

=== May ===
- 24
  - The start of Bergen International Music Festival Festspillene i Bergen (May 24 – June 5).
  - The 34th Nattjazz started in Bergen (May 24 – June 3).

=== June ===
- 14 – Norwegian Wood started in Oslo (June 14 – 18).

=== July ===
- 17 – The 46th Moldejazz started in Molde (July 17 – 22).

=== August ===
- 3 – The 19th Notodden Blues Festival started in Notodden (August 3 – 6).
- 9 – The 20th Sildajazz started in Haugesund (August 9 – 13).
- 13 – The 21st Oslo Jazzfestival started in Oslo (August 13 – 19).
- 24 – The 2nd Punktfestivalen started in Kristiansand (August 24–26).

=== September ===
- 13 – The DølaJazz started in Lillehammer (September 13 – 16).
- 28 – The 28th Ultima Oslo Contemporary Music Festival opened in Oslo (September 28 – Oktober 14).

=== October ===
- 11 – The 5th Insomnia Festival started in Tromsø (October 11 – 14).
- 31 – The Oslo World Music Festival started in Oslo (October 31 – November 5).

=== November ===
- 8 – The 1st Barents Jazz, Tromsø International Jazz Festival started (November 8 – 12).

=== December ===
- 11 – The Nobel Peace Prize Concert was held at Telenor Arena.

== Albums released ==
=== February ===
Day	Album	Artist	Label	Notes	Ref.
3	Vossabrygg	Terje Rypdal	ECM Records	Produced by Manfred Eicher	

=== Unknown date ===
K

Karin Krog

- Together Again (Grappa Music), with Steve Kuhn

== Deaths ==
January

- 23 – Olga Marie Mikalsen, singer (born 1915).

March

- 13 – Arne Dørumsgaard (84), composer and poet (born 1921).

September

- 3
  - Eva Knardahl, classical pianist (born 1927).
  - Lasse Myrvold (53), musician (born 1953).
- 4 – Ingrid Bjoner, opera singer (born 1927).
- 28 – Jan Werner Danielsen, singer (born 1976).

December

- 24 — Kenneth Sivertsen, composer and guitarist (born 1961).

== Births ==
January

- 10 – Angelina Jordan, jazz singer.

== See also ==
- 2006 in Norway
- Music of Norway
- Norway in the Eurovision Song Contest 2006
- 2006 in Swiss music
