= An Incomplete History of the Art of Funerary Violin =

Book tracing the lost history of funerary violin

An Incomplete History of the Art of the Funerary Violin
- Author: Rohan Kriwaczek
- Language: English
- Subject: Violin
- Published: 2006
- Publisher: Overlook Press
- ISBN: 1585678260

An Incomplete History of the Art of the Funerary Violin is a 2006 book by Rohan Kriwaczek, purportedly tracing the lost history of funerary violin. Contrary to its title, the book is a work of fiction; it is not an actual account of history.

Peter Mayer, the publisher of Overlook Press, doubted the veracity of the book and the history that it was said to contain; nevertheless, he agreed to publish it. Violin dealers and stringed instrument publications quickly refuted the existence of a musical genre called "funerary violin," as reported by The New York Times.

Defending his decision to publish the book, Mayer said:

I decided it didn't really matter to me how much of this was actually accurate. It was a life's work. [Kriwaczek] was dedicated to this guild not being forgotten, dedicated to the music. I decided this is just an amazing piece of work, and I wanted to publish it,... Who knows if it's true, but it's unbelievable reading.

The hoax was originally spotted by The Strad magazine. The author had submitted an article with illustrations and facsimiles of music manuscripts, but the sub-editor on the title, Matthew Rye, became suspicious that the images had been faked and that the facts could not be corroborated. The then-editor, Naomi Sadler, refused to publish the article.

Bookstores that have agreed to stock the book are unsure how to categorize it. The book does not really belong in fiction because it is not a typical narrative, but the art history section would also be incorrect because much "historical" fact has been invented.

Kriwaczek argues that his book is neither a hoax nor an attempt to mislead. He issued a statement on October 5, 2006, saying that he wanted to "expand the notion of musical composition to encompass the creation of an entire artistic genre, with its necessary accompanying history, mythology, philosophy, social function, etc."

== Publication information ==
- London; New York: Duckworth, 2006 (ISBN 1585678260)
