= Behzad Ranjbaran =

Persian composer (born 1955)

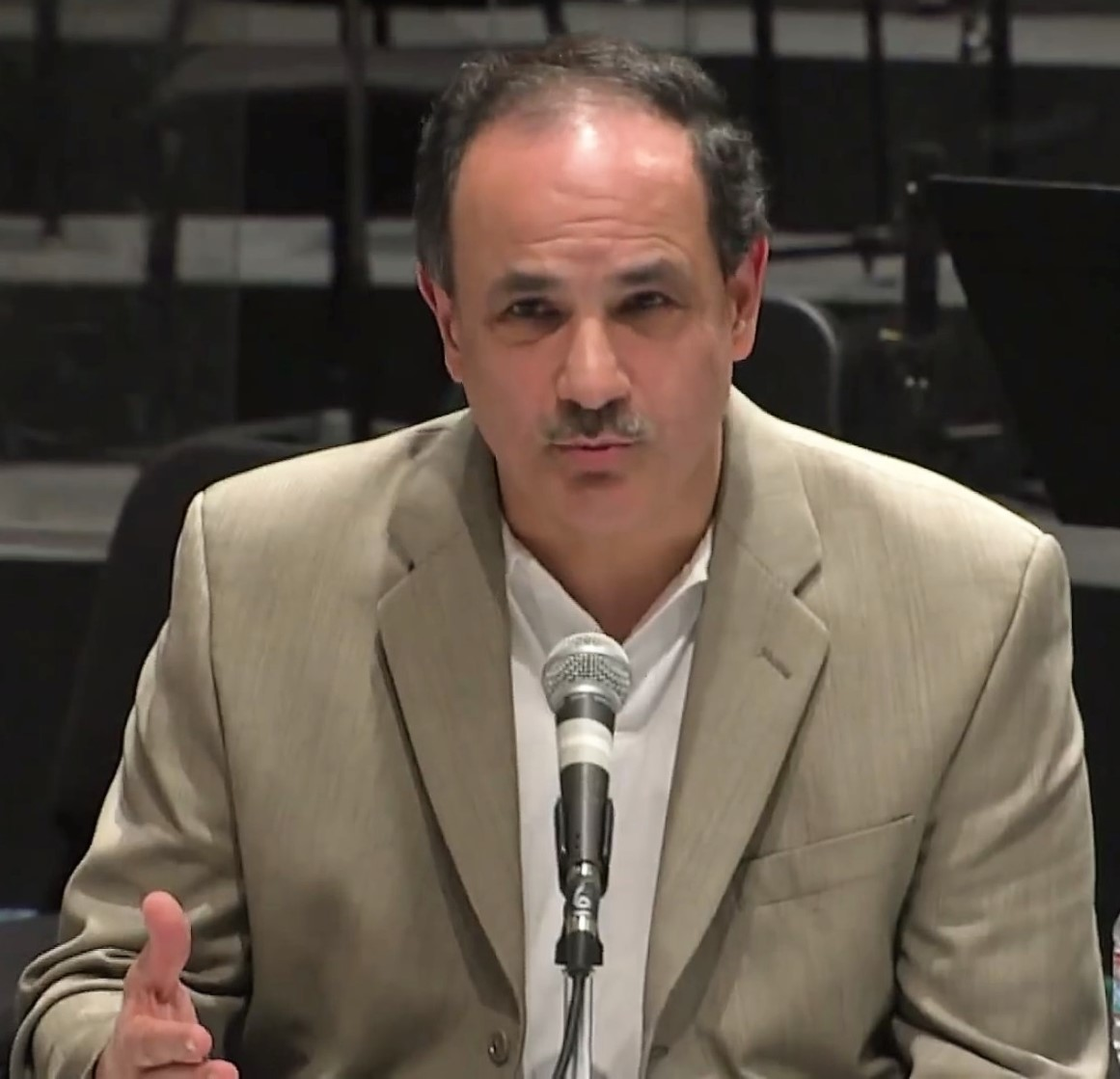
Ranjbaran at the 2012 Cabrillo Festival of Contemporary Music

Behzad Ranjbaran (Persian: بهزاد رنجبران; born 1955, in Tehran, Iran) is a Persian composer, known for his virtuosic concertos and colorful orchestral music. Ranjbaran's music draws from his cultural roots, incorporating Persian musical modes and rhythms.

== Life and career ==
Ranjbaran was born on July 1, 1955, in Tehran, Iran. He entered the Tehran Music Conservatory at the age of 9, studying the violin. In his teens while studying Western classical music, Ranjbaran began collecting folk music. Following his graduation, he immigrated to America in 1974. He studied at Indiana University, in Bloomington, and later at the Juilliard School in New York City where he obtained a DMA in music composition. His composition teachers at Juilliard were Vincent Persichetti, David Diamond, and Joseph Schwantner.

Ranjbaran's music is strongly rooted in the Neo-Romantic movement of the late 20th century, as well as showing the influence of Iranian and other non-Western music. He has written compositions for, among others, Joshua Bell, Renée Fleming, and Yo-Yo Ma, as well as a piano concerto for Jean-Yves Thibaudet.

Many of his works are inspired by Persian culture and literature. Persian Trilogy, a large orchestral cycle completed in 2000, was inspired by the Shahnameh of the 11th Century Persian poet Ferdowsi. He has been on the faculty of the Juilliard School since 1991.

His son Armand Ranjbaran and daughter Alina Ranjbaran are also composers.

== Selected works ==
Orchestral

- Elegy for string orchestra (1985)
- Persian Trilogy

1. Seemorgh (1991)
2. The Blood of Seyavash (ballet, 1994)
3. Seven Passages (2000)

- Symphony No. 1 (1992)
- Awakening for string orchestra (2005)
- Saratoga (2005)
- Mithra (2010)
- Esther (2015)

Concertos

- Concerto for violin and orchestra (1994)
- Concerto for cello and orchestra (1998)
- Elegy for cello and orchestra (1998)
- Moto Perpetuo for violin and string orchestra (2001)
- Elegy for cello (or clarinet) and string orchestra (2004)
- Concerto for piano and orchestra (2008)
- Concerto for violin, viola and orchestra (2009)
- Concerto for flute and orchestra (2013)
- Concerto for viola and orchestra (2014)
- Concerto for English horn and string orchestra (2015)
- Concerto for double bass and orchestra (2018)

Chamber music

- Six Caprices for 2 violins (1988)
- String Quartet No. 1 (1988)
- Dance of Life for violin and double bass (1990)
- Caprice No. 1 for violin solo (1995)
- Moto Perpetuo for violin and piano (1998)
- Ballade for double bass solo (1999)
- Elegy for cello and piano (2000)
- Moto Perpetuo for flute and piano (2004)
- "Enchanted Garden" for piano Quintet (2005)
- Shiraz for violin, cello and piano (2006)
- Isfahan for clarinet, harp, 2 violins, viola, cello and double bass (2007)
- Fountains of Fin for flute, violin and cello (2008)

Piano works

- Nocturne (A Night in a Persian Garden) (2002)

Vocal

- Songs of Eternity for soprano and orchestra (1998)
- Thomas Jefferson for narrator, solo cello and orchestra (1998)
- Three Persian Songs for soprano and piano

Choral

- Open Secret for chorus and mixed chamber ensemble (1999)
- We Are One for a cappella chorus (2008)
- We Are One for chorus and orchestra in 5 movements (2018)

== Awards ==
- Rudolf Nissim Award
- Charles Ives Award

== Students ==
- James Lavino
- Jay "Bluejay" Greenberg
