= Mish Mash (band) =

Music band

Mish Mash is a UK band created by Oscar Fullone who also created the Mish Mash parties in London and Glasgow. Comprised UK dj-circuit veterans Oscar Fullone and Kasper Winding, with vocals provided by Copenhagen native Louise Norby, also known as Lois. The group is best known for its hit single "Speechless", which reached number 16 on the UK Singles Chart in 2006 and was a hit in several other European countries.

== History ==
Oscar, an early acid house enthusiast, was active in the Scotland club scene. He released three of the first ten Soma tracks. Kasper, who is Danish and classically trained, came at music from quite different beginnings. He wrote a film score at age 13, secured a position in a radio orchestra at age 14, and kept on playing. He drummed for Teddy Pendergrass and Terry Riley in New York, and has released several solo projects. The two ostensibly met through their actress girlfriends and became friends and collaborators.

After building the Mish Mash parties - an avant-garde roaming club with widely varied musical styles, the two encountered an old friend Louise Norbye who started freestyling over an old disco track at a Paris concert they were hosting. The trio then founded Mish Mash the group.

The act was primarily one of creative enjoyment for the three.

"The only rule," laughs Kasper, "was to go really overboard, that there was to be no turning back. It had to be fun and put a smile on your face..." "But we wanted it to be quite dirty as well," interjects Oscar. "The re-emergence of that New York disco sound was perfect: there had to be a darkness to it. We wanted it to be big - big strings, dramatic all with a dirty groove." "Chic was an inspiration," recalls Kasper. "And Studio 54."

The act's initial album, Speechless, was chosen by Data Records to mark their 100th release. One review said of the group, "Looks like they’re having a stab at the hit parade. Provided they’ve got a video that includes semi-naked women prancing around in a badly choreographed routine, it’s safe to say they’ve got a hit on their hands."

== Discography ==
=== Albums ===
- Speechless (Crosstown Rebels, 2005)

=== Singles ===
List of singles, with selected chart positions
Title	Year	Peak chart positions					Album
Title	Year	UK	AUS	BEL (FL)	FIN	NLD	Album
"Speechless"	2005	16	57	23	1	48	Speechless
