= Mojo Fury =

Irish alternative rock band

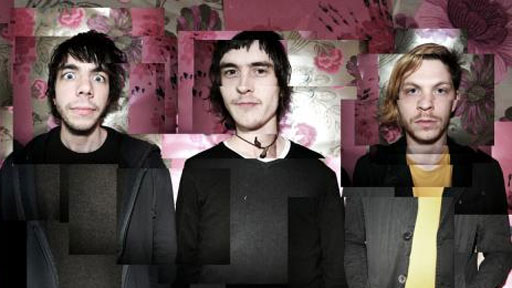
- Mojo Fury

Background information
- Origin: Lisburn, Northern Ireland
- Genres: Alternative rock, rock
- Years active: 2004–present
- Labels: Graphite Records
- Members: Michael Mormecha; James Lyttle; Ciaran McGreevy; Andrew Kearton
- Past members: Peter McAuley; Thomas Camblin
- Website: mojofury.co.uk

Mojo Fury are a Northern Irish alternative rock band from Lisburn, Northern Ireland. Their musical style has been described as "alternative rock" with "progressive" and "hardcore" influence, and the band have been compared to Nine Inch Nails, Queens of the Stone Age and Nirvana. To date, the band have toured all over the country and supported the likes of Biffy Clyro, Oceansize, Two Door Cinema Club and The Cooper Temple Clause.

== Background ==
Originally a three-piece, the band's singer/drummer, Michael Mormecha moved out from behind the kit in 2009 and are now a four-piece. The current lineup is Michael Mormecha (lead vocals, guitars), James Lyttle (guitars, vocals, keyboards), Ciaran McGreevy (bass guitar) and Andrew Kearton (drums).

At the end of April 2010, the band released an 'early album version' of "Deep Fish Tank (Factory Settings)" as a free download on their bandcamp site. In May 2011 they released their debut album Visiting Hours of Traveling Circus.

== Discography ==
=== EP's ===
- Mojo Fury EP (September, 2004)
- Untitled EP (February, 2006)
- Visiting Hours... EP (May, 2007)

=== Studio albums ===
Visiting Hours of a Traveling Circus – released 9 May 2011.

The Difference Between – released Sep 2013

=== Music videos ===
- "The Mann" – Directed by Kevin Godley
- "The Mann" (album version) – Directed by Tristan Crowe
- "Deep Fish Tank" (Factory Settings) – Directed by James Lyttle
- "We Should Just Run Away" – Directed by Darren Lee
- "Colour Of The Bear" – Directed by Darren Lee
- "The Difference Between" – Directed by Tommy Keery
- "Origami Bird" – Visual art concept by Helena Hamilton, shot by Maverick Renegade Productions
- "Iris Influential" – Directed by Daniel Holmes
- "All In Awe" – Directed by Daniel Holmes

== Reviews ==
We Should Just Runaway – South Sonic single review
