= Persian Trilogy =

Persian Trilogy is a set of three orchestral works composed by Iranian classical musician, Behzad Ranjbaran. All three works were inspired by stories from the Shahnameh ("The Book of Kings"), the Persian epic poem written by Ferdowsi in 11th century. Ranjbaran developed a lifelong fascination about Shahnameh ("The Book of Kings") from his childhood growing up in Iran.

Ranjbaran used three episodes from this epic as the basis for his music:

- Seemorgh (also "Simorgh"): a tone poem in three movements describing the fabulous magical bird Simorgh in her involvement with humankind and the natural elements surrounding her: the mountain, the moonlight and the sunrise.
- The Blood of Seyavash: conceived as a ballet in seven movements, relating the story of Prince Seyavash as young prince and heir, his seduction and betrayal, his trial by fire, his tormented loyalties, the seeds of envy, his idyllic love, and the prophecies fulfilled.
- Seven Passages: derives its inspiration from an episode in the Shahnameh, titled "The Seven Trials of Rostam".

In 2008, Toronto Symphony Orchestra performed a multimedia version of Persian Trilogy, which included the music, the naqqali, the traditional Persian theatrical storytelling, and the projection of Persian miniatures for the related episodes. Persian Trilogy was recorded by London Symphony Orchestra, conducted by JoAnn Falletta.

== See also ==
- Persian Symphonic Music
- Rostam and Sohrab (opera)
