= Morning Runner =

English alternative rock band

Background information
- Origin: Reading, England
- Genres: Alternative rock, indie rock
- Years active: 2003–2007
- Labels: Parlophone, Faith & Hope
- Past members: Matthew Jonathan Greener; Ali Clewer; Tom Derrett; Chris "Fields" Wheatcroft

Morning Runner were an English alternative rock band, formed in 2003 in Reading, Berkshire. The band comprised vocalist/guitarist Matthew Jonathan Greener, drummer Ali Clewer, bassist Tom Derrett and pianist Chris "Fields" Wheatcroft.

They released one album, Wilderness Is Paradise Now, following top 20 single "Burning Benches", before splitting up in late 2007 due to commercial pressures from their record label, Parlophone.

== History ==
=== Origin and early years (2003–2005) ===
Morning Runner formed in Reading, Berkshire. Pianist Chris "Fields" Wheatcroft moved to Reading from Salisbury, where he had dropped out of his classical music course, and Nottingham born vocalist/guitarist Matthew Jonathan Greener moved there with his parents in his early teens. Drummer Ali Clewer and bassist Tom Derrett are from Reading originally.

Greener began as a drummer in another band, writing some of their material himself. He left to perform solo, until one night a local promoter asked him to play again with his band. Greener agreed, without admitting he did not have one, so hurriedly recruited Derrett and Clewer, who were previously members of the Reading band Jericho.

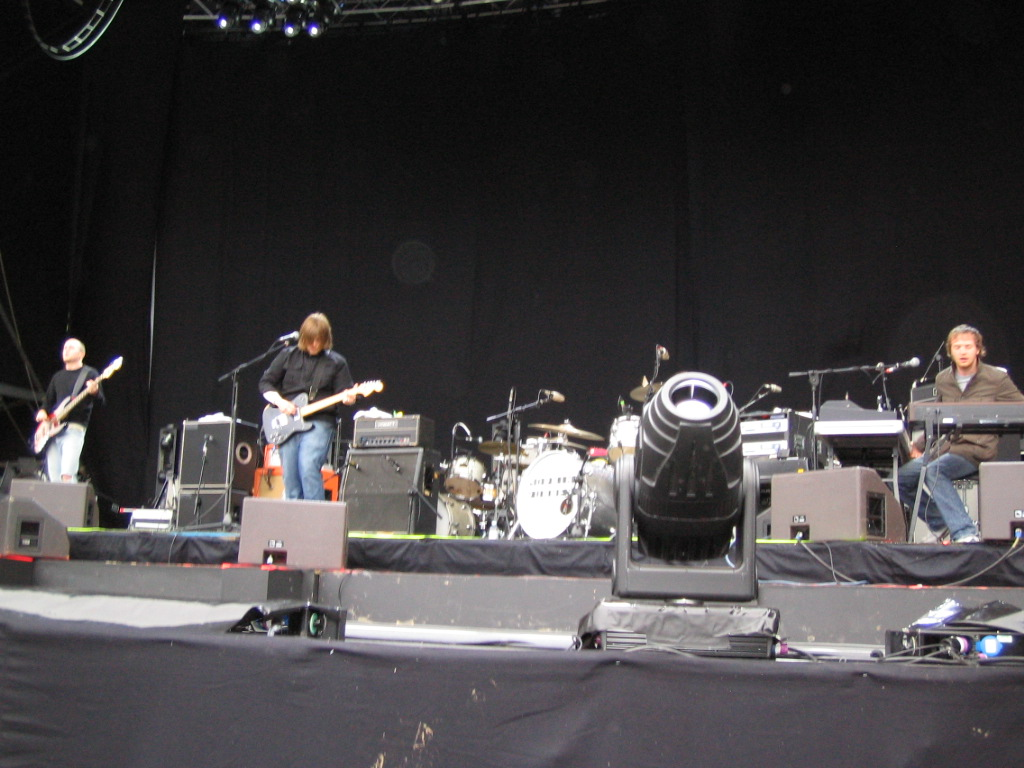
Morning Runner supporting Coldplay

At their debut performance, future member Fields liked what he saw, and was invited to join the band. Although Greener was initially reluctant to add a pianist into the mix, Derret has credited Fields with encouraging the band's melodic sound: "There were three of us just playing as loud as we could", Derrett said, "then Fields came in and introduced us to melody."

At first, they traded under Greener's name, but soon decided they required their own moniker. After three months of fraught discussion they chose the first name they came up with. The name "Morning Runner" came about from the vast impression that people who run in the early hours made on Greener, "It made me think of the pursuit people make to try and better themselves, be it physically, mentally or spiritually, when people will pass away one day anyway."

Morning Runner were soon making waves, with the band signing to Manchester independent record label Faith & Hope in 2003. After putting out The Great Escape in 2004 they played numerous gigs around the country and simultaneously became one of the most sought after bands on the A&R circuit. This led to the band signing with Parlophone in November 2004 and paved the way for a busy schedule in the year ahead.

The band spent much of 2005 touring, playing with the likes of Ian Brown, Bloc Party, The Magic Numbers, The Pogues, and supporting Coldplay on several of their Twisted Logic Tour dates, and built up a solid fanbase as a result.

=== Wilderness Is Paradise Now (2005–2006) ===
Lead singer Matthew Greener

After a couple of false starts, they began working with producer John Cornfield to record their debut album. At first Cornfield was unsure about the album but later agreed to help. In May, they released their first EP with Parlophone, Drawing Shapes, which led to a range of plaudits by NME, The Guardian, Steve Lamacq and Jo Whiley. The name of the EP came from inspiration the lead singer/guitarist Matthew Greener had after a "funny weekend". He said, "I was tired and you notice things that you don't normally notice ... I realised that everything was generally a square or a circle. And when you see the blueprints for a building or whatever, they're always made of lots of little boxes. This is our first EP, it's us drawing shapes." This was followed by their debut single, "Gone Up in Flames", in August.

In early 2006, Morning Runner embarked on an extensive three-month headline tour of the UK to promote the release of their debut album. In February, they released the single "Burning Benches", which broke the band into the top 20 of the official UK Singles Chart, as well as being made single of the week by Steve Lamacq, Scott Mills, and Colin and Edith on BBC Radio 1. Their debut album, Wilderness Is Paradise Now, was released shortly afterwards on 6 March 2006, and despite failing to make a significant impact commercially, it was generally critically well received.

Mike Pattenden from The Times found the album to be a generally strong debut, commenting that the slower tracks displayed a "transcendent quality that suggest Morning Runner are in it for the long haul". On the negative side, however, the band suffered occasional accusations that they were too similar to other piano-driven bands, such as Coldplay and Keane, although some critics refuted these, with NME's Paul McNamee saying "they're a band that could knock 10 bells out of Keane" and Phil Mongredien of Q stating that a Coldplay comparison "would be doing Morning Runner a disservice."

Over the summer of 2006, Morning Runner continued to keep up their reputation as a formidable live band, playing at some of the largest festivals in the UK including the Isle of Wight Festival, T in the Park, V Festival, and Guilfest. They were also special guests for Embrace in the Forestry Commission's 'Forest Tours 2006'. The Wilderness Is Paradise Now campaign finally came to an end in August 2006 with a homecoming concert in Reading followed by a headline show at Manifest in Mexico.

=== Beginnings of a second album and the end of Morning Runner (2006–2007) ===
The band began working on their second album in September 2006. At the beginning of 2007 they played two intimate shows to showcase their new material, one on 26 January at the South Street Arts Centre in Reading, and the other on 26 February at The Zodiac in Oxford. Following more gigs in June and July, the songwriting stage of the next album was said to be nearing completion, and by August the band were seeking a record producer to work with.

However, on 10 October the band posted a message on their official forum announcing their split. They blamed the split on pressures from their record label, saying that Parlophone had "heaped pressure on us to have a follow up hit record", partly due to the "relative commercial failure" of their first album. Parlophone had said that their music "wasn't commercially viable", and, after two days of contemplation, the band decided to go their separate ways. Their statement added that Matthew Greener and Ali Clewer would "probably go on to perform together in the future", and thanked fans for their support. Greener later commented on the end of the band, that "the year we had to write the second album was pretty bad. There was so much pressure and I don’t think we coped with that especially well".

Since their split, Morning Runner's music has continued to be used in other media, notably "Gone Up in Flames" as the theme tune for the E4 sitcom The Inbetweeners, used on Setanta Sports coverage of the IPL and on the FIFA 07 game soundtrack, and "Burning Benches" as part of the Adidas 'Impossible is Nothing' advertising campaign.

== Post split ==
Shortly after the split, Greener stated that he was in discussions with the other members of the band about releasing some of the demo tracks for the unfinished second album. He performed a handful of solo acoustic sets, including a support slot with SixNationState in Winchester two months after the band's split, before forming the more electronic sounding Glass in 2011 with former band mate Ali Clewer. The band supported Pete & The Pirates on tour before changing their name in September 2012 to Perfect Life. The band split in early 2014 prior to releasing anything commercially, with Clewer moving to Berlin. Greener has gone on to perform sporadic solo gigs in Reading whilst working as a heating engineer running his own business, Greener Heating & Plumbing.

Morning Runner reunited in February 2014 for a low key one-off free entry gig at Oakford Social Club, Reading.

== Band members ==
The band consisted of:

- Matthew Greener - lead vocals, guitar
- Tom Derrett - bass guitar, backing vocals
- Chris "Fields" Wheatcroft - piano/keyboard, backing vocals
- Ali Clewer - drums/percussion

== Discography ==
=== Albums ===
- Wilderness Is Paradise Now (6 March 2006), Parlophone / Faith & Hope – No. 25 UK

=== EPs ===
- The Great Escape (21 June 2004), Faith & Hope
- Drawing Shapes (23 May 2005), Parlophone / Faith & Hope – No. 70 UK

=== Singles ===
Title	Release date	Album	Label	Peak chart positions
Title	Release date	Album	Label	UK Singles Chart
"Gone Up in Flames"	1 August 2005	Wilderness Is Paradise Now	Parlophone / Faith & Hope	39
"Be All You Want Me to Be"	24 October 2005	Wilderness Is Paradise Now	Parlophone / Faith & Hope	44
"Have a Good Time" (Limited edition)	12 December 2005	Wilderness Is Paradise Now	Faith & Hope	—
"Burning Benches"	20 February 2006	Wilderness Is Paradise Now	Parlophone / Faith & Hope	19
"The Great Escape" (Limited edition)	15 May 2006	Wilderness Is Paradise Now	Parlophone / Faith & Hope	56
"Oceans" (Limited edition)	14 August 2006	Wilderness Is Paradise Now	Parlophone / Faith & Hope	—
