= Jorge Antunes (composer) =

Brazilian politician and composer

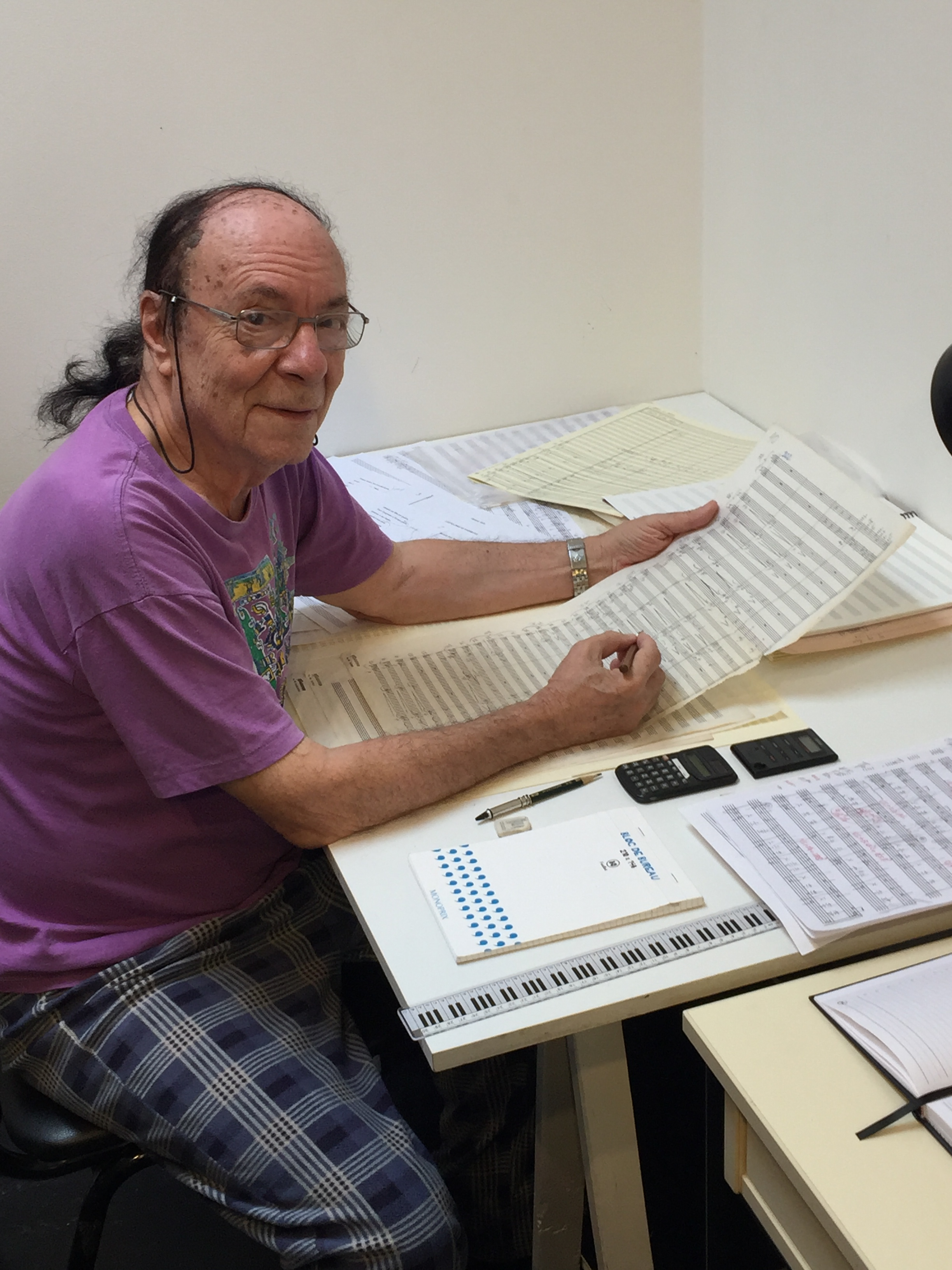
Jorge Antunes composing the Leopoldina opera during this artistic residency in the Cité internationale des arts, 2020

Jorge de Freitas Antunes (born 23 April 1942) is a Brazilian avant-garde composer of electroacoustic and acousmatic music. He is known as the man who pioneered electronic music in Brazil.

Born in Rio de Janeiro, Antunes entered the Escola de Música da Universidade Federal do Rio de Janeiro in 1959 where he studied violin. He went on to earn Master of Music degrees in both violin and composition from the Federal University of Rio de Janeiro and a Doctor of Music in electroacoustic music from the University of Paris (1977).

== Biography ==
In 1973, Antunes became a professor at the University of Brasília. He directs the Laboratory of Electroacoustic Music and teaches Composition and Musical Acoustics.

== Selected works ==
=== Opera ===
- Contato (1968)
- Vivaldia MCMLXXV, chamber opera buffa (1975)
- Qorpo Santo, opera in three acts (1983)
- O rei de uma nota só (The Single-tone King), mini-opera in four scenes (1991)
- A borboleta azul (The Blue Butterfly), mini-opera in two acts (1995)
- Olga (composed 1987–97, premiered 2006)

=== Chamber music ===
- Mascaruncho for two violas (1977)
- Microformóbiles I for viola and piano (1970)
- Modinha para Mindinha (Tune for Mindinha) for seven violas (1985)

=== Discography ===
Paul Gutama Soegijo / Jorge Antunes / Peter Schat / Junsang Bahk - IGNM - SIMC - ISCM / Musikprotokoll 1972 / Steirischer Herbst '72 / 9 10 17 10 (LP, Promo) Internationale Gesellschaft für Neue Musik - Sektion Österreich, Internationale Gesellschaft für Neue Musik - Sektion Österreich, ORF, ORF 0120045, 0120 045 1973

==== Música Eletrônica ====
- 2 versions E. S. Mangione 1975
- Catastrofe Ultra-Violeta / Isomerism (LP) Sistrum LPS 3001 1976
- !No Se Mata La Justicia! (LP) Sistrum LPS 3002 1981
- Jorge Antunes e o GeMUnB - Jorge Antunes e o GeMUnB (CD, Album) UnB Discos CD 350010 2002
- !No Se Mata La Justicia! (CD, Album) Paulinas COMEP CD 11807-9 2003
- Música De Câmara II (CD, Album) Sistrum Edições Musicais Ltda. CDST008 2010
- Música De Câmara I (CD, Album) Sistrum Edições Musicais Ltda. CDST007 2010
- Coloratus (CDr, Album) ABM Digital, Academia Brasileira De Música none 2011
- In Defense Of The Machine (CD) Pogus Productions 21067-2 2013
- Cordas Dedilhadas (2xCD, Album) Selo SESC SP CDSS 0132/19 2020

==== Singles & EPs ====
- Musica Electronica 70's I (CD, Mini) Sistrum Edições Musicais Ltda. CD ST 001 1994
- Musica Electronica 70's II (CD, Mini) Sistrum Edições Musicais Ltda. CD ST 002 1995
- Musica Electronica 90's I (CD, Mini) Sistrum Edições Musicais Ltda. CD ST 004 1998

==== Compilations ====
- Música Eletroacústica - Periodo Do Pioneirismo 2 versions ABM Digital, Academia Brasileira De Música 2002
