= Colin and Edith =

BBC radio show

Colin and Edith is a radio show broadcast on BBC Radio 1 until 12 August 2006, hosted by radio personalities Edith Bowman and Colin Murray. The show began in 2003 and was scheduled on the station's weekend morning shift. In April 2004, following the departure of Mark Radcliffe and Marc Riley, the show was rescheduled to the weekday afternoon slot, from 13:00 to 16:00. Their last show together was part of Radio 1's Six Weeks of Summer on 12 August 2006. Colin moved on to his own evening speciality music show while Edith continued to present in the same time slot.

== Features ==
=== Guest interviews ===
Occasionally a special guest was interviewed in the studio or over the phone. Guests included George Lucas, Foo Fighters, Natalie Portman, Tom Jones, Paul McCartney, Dido, Ice Cube, Tom Baker, Richard Park, Take That, a-ha, Ashley Jensen, Trey Parker and Matt Stone, McFly, Nick Park, David Schwimmer, Jason Donovan, Ricky Tomlinson, Peter Kay and Kermit the Frog.

=== Regular segments ===
The show was segmented into different sections which were included on every show, with the exception of 'Take On Me' which cannot be played if either presenter is absent. These segments are listed below.

==== Bits and Pieces ====
Colin & Edith brought back the classic Radio 1 Roadshow game for a few months in which much music was mixed together in short bursts, and contestants have to remember as many tracks as they can.

==== CD Burner ====
Colin and Edith pick a song which is due to be released which is played everyday of the week for one week. The last song they picked was Baby Boom by The Crimea.

==== Lunchtime Link-up ====
An office or group of friends is given the chance to choose the theme of the show's first hour and the public can text or e-mail an anecdotal story related to that theme. The public can also suggest a song related to that theme. The best suggestion is picked and played at the end of the hour.

==== Five Decades of Radio 1 ====
A feature created to celebrate Radio 1's fortieth anniversary, which over time underwent various format changes. The public vote for the best song out of five picked from the current date in random years in Radio 1's forty-year history. A consistent pattern was noted that if one of the songs is from the mid-1990s it would usually win.

==== Take On Me ====
A quiz where a caller challenged either Edith or Colin, or both of them at the same time, in a memory game. Each was given 30 seconds to list items from a specified subject, for example "Disney films from the 90s" or "song titles including names". Despite the challenger being allowed to go first, Colin and Edith normally won which led to changes in the rules giving the challenger more points if they took on both Colin and Edith. The feature was named after the a-ha song, "Take On Me" and parts of the song were used as a jingle and background music for the feature. The points won by either Colin and Edith or the public ran cumulatively each day until the last ever game on Thursday 10 August 2006 when the presenters were almost guaranteed to win overall and so took on a regular listener 'Kendle' in a winner takes all game. Colin and Edith won 15-7.

==== Sucking Diesel ====
A quiz which pitted members of the public from different home nations against each other in their own individually chosen subjects.

==== The Best Compilation Tape in the World... Ever! ====
Various songs were collated by a user vote over a number of weeks to create a 'mix tape' of popular songs. The final collection of songs selected was as follows:

Ash - Girl From Mars

Beastie Boys - No Sleep Till Brooklyn

Chemical Brothers - Block Rockin' Beats

Def Leppard - Pour Some Sugar On Me

EMF - Unbelievable

Faithless - Insomnia

Green Day - Basket Case

House of Fun - Jump Around

Idlewild - American English

Michael Jackson - Billie Jean

KLF - 3am Eternal

John Lennon - Imagine

Metallica - Enter Sandman

Nirvana - Smells Like Teen Spirit

Offspring - Pretty Fly For A White Guy

The Proclaimers - I'm Gonna Be (500 miles)

Queen - Don't Stop Me Now

Red Hot Chili Peppers - Californication

Stone Roses - Fools Gold

Tenacious D - Tribute

The Undertones - Teenage Kicks

The Verve - Bittersweet Symphony

Wheatus - Teenage Dirtbag

Will Young - Leave Right Now
