= List of Billboard Hot 100 top-ten singles in 2005 =

This is a list of singles that have peaked in the Top 10 of the Billboard Hot 100 during 2005.

50 Cent scored six top ten hits during the year with "Disco Inferno", "How We Do", "Candy Shop", "Hate It or Love It", "Just a Lil Bit", and "Outta Control (remix)", the most among all other artists.

== Top-ten singles ==
Key

- ↑ – indicates single's top 10 entry was also its Hot 100 debut
- † – indicates Best performing song of the year
- (#) – 2005 year-end top 10 single position and rank

List of Billboard Hot 100 top ten singles which peaked in 2005
Top ten entry date	Single	Artist(s)	Peak	Peak date	Weeks in top ten
Singles from 2004
November 27	"Let Me Love You" (#3)	Mario	1	January 1	21
December 4	"1, 2 Step" (#5)	Ciara featuring Missy Elliott	2	January 8	17
December 11	"Lovers & Friends"	Lil Jon & the East Side Boyz featuring Usher and Ludacris	3	January 22	14
December 18	"Soldier"	Destiny's Child featuring T.I. and Lil Wayne	3	February 12	11
Singles from 2005
January 1	"I Don't Want to Be"	Gavin DeGraw	10	January 1	2
January 8	"Disco Inferno"	50 Cent	3	March 26	17
January 22	"How We Do"	The Game featuring 50 Cent	4	February 19	12
January 29	"Boulevard of Broken Dreams" (#7)	Green Day	2	March 5	14
February 5	"Bring Em Out"	T.I.	9	February 5	1
February 12	"Since U Been Gone" (#4)	Kelly Clarkson	2	April 9	20
February 19	"Candy Shop" (#8)	50 Cent featuring Olivia	1	March 5	14
February 26	"Rich Girl"	Gwen Stefani featuring Eve	7	March 5	8
March 5	"Caught Up"	Usher	8	March 26	7
March 19	"Obsession (No Es Amor)"	Frankie J featuring Baby Bash	3	April 2	8
April 2	"Hate It or Love It"	The Game featuring 50 Cent	2	April 16	12
April 16	"Lonely"	Akon	4	April 23	7
April 23	"1 Thing"	Amerie	8	April 23	3
April 23	"Hollaback Girl" (#2)	Gwen Stefani	1	May 7	18
April 23	"Lonely No More"	Rob Thomas	6	May 21	6
April 30	"Oh"	Ciara featuring Ludacris	2	May 21	11
May 7	"Speed of Sound" ↑	Coldplay	8	May 7	2
May 14	"Just a Lil Bit"	50 Cent	3	June 18	12
May 14	"Slow Down"	Bobby Valentino	8	May 21	3
May 14	"We Belong Together" † (#1)	Mariah Carey	1	June 4	23
May 28	"Don't Phunk with My Heart"	The Black Eyed Peas	3	June 25	12
June 4	"Behind These Hazel Eyes" (#10)	Kelly Clarkson	6	June 11	15
June 4	"Switch"	Will Smith	7	June 18	5
June 11	"Mr. Brightside"	The Killers	10	June 11	1
June 18	"Grind with Me"	Pretty Ricky	7	June 25	5
July 2	"Inside Your Heaven" ↑	Carrie Underwood	1	July 2	4
July 2	"Get It Poppin'"	Fat Joe featuring Nelly	9	July 30	3
July 9	"Inside Your Heaven" ↑	Bo Bice	2	July 9	2
July 9	"Don't Cha" (#9)	The Pussycat Dolls featuring Busta Rhymes	2	August 20	14
July 16	"Lose Control"	Missy Elliott featuring Ciara and Fatman Scoop	3	September 17	12
July 16	"Pon de Replay"	Rihanna	2	July 30	11
July 30	"Let Me Hold You"	Bow Wow featuring Omarion	4	August 13	8
August 6	"Pimpin' All Over the World"	Ludacris featuring Bobby Valentino	9	August 6	3
August 13	"Listen to Your Heart"	DHT	8	August 20	5
August 13	"You and Me"	Lifehouse	5	August 27	6
August 27	"Shake It Off"	Mariah Carey	2	September 10	13
September 3	"Like You"	Bow Wow featuring Ciara	3	October 1	11
September 17	"Gold Digger" (#6)	Kanye West featuring Jamie Foxx	1	September 17	19
September 17	"Sugar, We're Goin Down"	Fall Out Boy	8	September 17	5
September 24	"My Humps"	The Black Eyed Peas	3	November 5	16
September 24	"Outta Control (remix)"	50 Cent featuring Mobb Deep	6	October 1	2
September 24	"Wake Me Up When September Ends"	Green Day	6	October 15	7
October 1	"Play"	David Banner	7	October 15	4
October 8	"Beverly Hills"	Weezer	10	October 8	1
October 8	"Photograph"	Nickelback	2	October 22	17
October 15	"Soul Survivor"	Young Jeezy featuring Akon	4	November 12	10
October 22	"Because of You"	Kelly Clarkson	7	November 19	10
October 22	"Run It!"	Chris Brown featuring Juelz Santana	1	November 26	17
November 5	"We Be Burnin'"	Sean Paul	6	November 12	7
November 19	"I'm Sprung"	T-Pain	8	November 19	2
November 26	"Stickwitu"	The Pussycat Dolls	5	December 31	12
December 3	"Hung Up"	Madonna	7	December 3	2
December 17	"Don't Forget About Us"	Mariah Carey	1	December 31	8
December 17	"When I'm Gone"	Eminem	8	December 17	2

=== 2004 peaks ===
List of Billboard Hot 100 top ten singles in 2005 which peaked in 2004
Top ten entry date	Single	Artist	Peak	Peak date	Weeks in top ten
September 25	"My Boo"	Usher and Alicia Keys	1	October 30	19
October 9	"Lose My Breath"	Destiny's Child	3	October 30	14
October 30	"Breakaway"	Kelly Clarkson	6	November 20	10
October 30	"Drop It Like It's Hot"	Snoop Dogg featuring Pharrell	1	December 11	17
October 30	"Over and Over"	Nelly featuring Tim McGraw	3	December 4	15
November 20	"Wonderful"	Ja Rule featuring R. Kelly and Ashanti	5	November 27	9

=== 2006 peaks ===
List of Billboard Hot 100 top ten singles in 2005 which peaked in 2006
Top ten entry date	Single	Artist	Peak	Peak date	Weeks in top ten
November 26	"Laffy Taffy"	D4L	1	January 14	11
December 24	"Grillz"	Nelly featuring Paul Wall and Ali & Gipp	1	January 21	13
December 31	"Check on It"	Beyoncé featuring Bun B and Slim Thug	1	February 4	14
December 31	"There It Go (The Whistle Song)"	Juelz Santana	6	January 28	5

== Artists with most top-ten songs ==
List of artists by total songs peaking in the top-ten
Artist	Numbers of songs
50 Cent	6
Ciara	4
Kelly Clarkson	4
Usher	3
Ludacris	3
Mariah Carey	3
T.I.	2
The Game	2
Gwen Stefani	2
Missy Elliott	2
Bobby Valentino	2
Bow Wow	2
The Black Eyed Peas	2
Green Day	2
Akon	2
The Pussycat Dolls	2
Destiny's Child	2
Nelly	2
Juelz Santana	2

== See also ==
- 2005 in music
- List of Billboard Hot 100 number ones of 2005
- Billboard Year-End Hot 100 singles of 2005
