= Billboard Year-End Hot R&B/Hip-Hop Songs of 2005 =

American music chart

This is a list of Billboard magazine's Top Hot R&B/Hip-Hop Songs of 2005.

No.	Title	Artist(s)
1	"Let Me Love You"	Mario
2	"We Belong Together"	Mariah Carey
3	"Lovers and Friends"	Lil Jon & the East Side Boyz featuring Usher and Ludacris
4	"Truth Is"	Fantasia
5	"Drop It Like It's Hot"	Snoop Dogg featuring Pharrell
6	"Slow Down"	Bobby Valentino
7	"Free Yourself"	Fantasia
8	"How We Do"	The Game featuring 50 Cent
9	"Wait (The Whisper Song)"	Ying Yang Twins
10	"Soldier"	Destiny's Child featuring T.I. and Lil Wayne
11	"Cater 2 U"	Destiny's Child
12	"Ordinary People"	John Legend
13	"Must Be Nice"	Lyfe Jennings
14	"Gold Digger"	Kanye West featuring Jamie Foxx
15	"1, 2 Step"	Ciara featuring Missy Elliott
16	"Oh"	Ciara featuring Ludacris
17	"Some Cut"	Trillville featuring Cutty
18	"Bring Em Out"	T.I.
19	"Disco Inferno"	50 Cent
20	"Like You"	Bow Wow featuring Ciara
21	"U Already Know"	112 featuring Foxy Brown
22	"Candy Shop"	50 Cent featuring Olivia
23	"U Don't Know Me"	T.I.
24	"Let Me Hold You"	Bow Wow featuring Omarion
25	"Shake It Off"	Mariah Carey
26	"1 Thing"	Amerie
27	"Soul Survivor"	Young Jeezy featuring Akon
28	"Hate It or Love It"	The Game featuring 50 Cent
29	"Just a Lil Bit"	50 Cent
30	"I Can't Stop Loving You"	Kem
31	"O"	Omarion
32	"I'm a Hustla"	Cassidy
33	"Give Me That"	Webbie featuring Bun B
34	"Play"	David Banner
35	"My Boo"	Usher and Alicia Keys
36	"Charlene"	Anthony Hamilton
37	"Run It!"	Chris Brown featuring Juelz Santana
38	"Karma"	Lloyd Banks featuring Avant
39	"Wonderful"	Ja Rule featuring R. Kelly
40	"Again"	Faith Evans
41	"Pimpin' All Over the World"	Ludacris featuring Bobby Valentino
42	"Grind with Me"	Pretty Ricky
43	"Okay"	Nivea featuring Lil Jon and YoungBloodZ
44	"Charlie, Last Name Wilson"	Charlie Wilson
45	"Number One Spot"	Ludacris
46	"Naked"	Marques Houston
47	"Girl Tonite"	Twista featuring Trey Songz
48	"Dem Boyz"	Boyz n da Hood
49	"Lose Control"	Missy Elliott featuring Ciara and Fatman Scoop
50	"Get Back"	Ludacris
51	"Make Her Feel Good"	Teairra Mari
52	"Trapped in the Closet (Chapter 1)"	R. Kelly
53	"Diary"	Alicia Keys featuring Tony! Toni! Toné!
54	"I Think They Like Me"	Dem Franchize Boyz featuring Jermaine Dupri, Da Brat and Bow Wow
55	"Hollaback Girl"	Gwen Stefani
56	"Don't Cha"	The Pussycat Dolls featuring Busta Rhymes
57	"Girl"	Destiny's Child
58	"Caught Up"	Usher
59	"Only U"	Ashanti
60	"What U Gon' Do"	Lil Jon & the East Side Boyz featuring Lil Scrappy
61	"Gotta Go Gotta Leave (Tired)"	Vivian Green
62	"In the Kitchen"	R. Kelly
63	"Unbreakable"	Alicia Keys
64	"So Seductive"	Tony Yayo featuring 50 Cent
65	"How Could You"	Mario
66	"And Then What"	Young Jeezy featuring Mannie Fresh
67	"Go D.J."	Lil Wayne
68	"U Make Me Wanna"	Jadakiss featuring Mariah Carey
69	"Lighters Up"	Lil' Kim
70	"Girlfight"	Brooke Valentine featuring Big Boi and Lil Jon
71	"I Should Have Cheated"	Keyshia Cole
72	"Tell Me"	Bobby Valentino
73	"Karma"	Alicia Keys
74	"Baby Mama"	Fantasia
75	"Back Then"	Mike Jones
76	"Stay Fly"	Three 6 Mafia featuring Young Buck and 8Ball & MJG
77	"Welcome to Jamrock"	Damian Marley
78	"It's Like That"	Mariah Carey
79	"I'm Sprung"	T-Pain
80	"ASAP"	T.I.
81	"All Because of You"	Marques Houston featuring Young Rome
82	"Dreams"	The Game
83	"Gotta Make It"	Trey Songz featuring Twista
84	"New York"	Ja Rule featuring Fat Joe and Jadakiss
85	"Badd"	Ying Yang Twins featuring Mike Jones and Mr. Collipark
86	"Breathe"	Fabolous
87	"I'm a King"	P$C featuring T.I. and Lil Scrappy
88	"Outta Control" (remix)	50 Cent featuring Mobb Deep
89	"Shorty Wanna Ride"	Young Buck
90	"Let's Go"	Trick Daddy featuring Twista and Lil Jon
91	"Diamonds from Sierra Leone"	Kanye West
92	"Forever, for Always, for Love"	Lalah Hathaway
93	"Still Tippin'"	Mike Jones featuring Slim Thug and Paul Wall
94	"Let's Get Blown"	Snoop Dogg featuring Pharrell
95	"One Wish"	Ray J
96	"Laffy Taffy"	D4L
97	"Baby"	Ying Yang Twins featuring Trick Daddy
98	"Get It Poppin'"	Fat Joe featuring Nelly
99	"Can't Satisfy Her"	I Wayne
100	"Lose My Breath"	Destiny's Child

== See also ==
- 2005 in music
- Billboard Year-End Hot 100 singles of 2005
- Billboard Year-End Hot Rap Singles of 2005
- List of number-one R&B singles of 2005 (U.S.)
