= Billboard Year-End Hot 100 singles of 2005 =

Ranking of recorded music

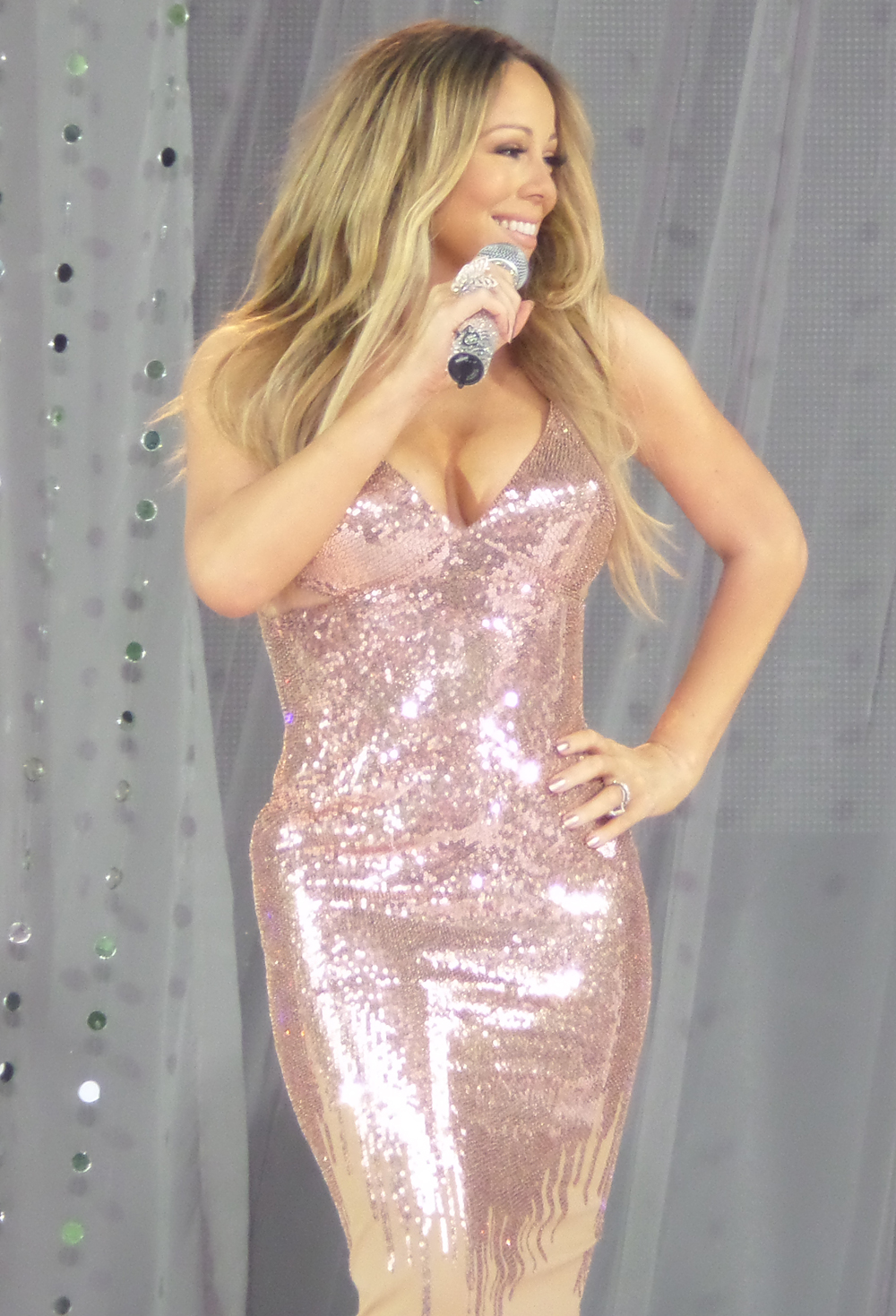
Mariah Carey topped the chart with her song "We Belong Together". She also reached No. 15 with "Shake It Off" and No. 69 with "It's Like That" featuring Jermaine Dupri and Fatman Scoop.

The Billboard Hot 100 is a chart that ranks the best-performing singles in the United States. Its data, published by Billboard magazine and compiled by Nielsen SoundScan, is based collectively on each single's weekly physical and digital sales, as well as airplay and streaming. At the end of a year, Billboard will publish an annual list of the 100 most successful songs throughout that year on the Hot 100 chart based on the information. For 2005, the list was published on December 20, calculated with data from December 4, 2004, to November 26, 2005. The R&B track "We Belong Together" by American singer Mariah Carey was named the number 1 song of 2005, and it spent the longest time at number 1 for the year, 14 weeks. This is also the fourth-longest time at number 1 for a single in the 66-year history of the Hot 100 post-1958 inception, after Mariah Carey collaboration with Boyz II Men, "One Sweet Day", which spent 16 weeks atop the Hot 100 from 1995 to 1996, and "Despacito" by Luis Fonsi and Daddy Yankee, featuring Justin Bieber, which equaled that mark in 2017, both being beaten in 2019 by "Old Town Road" by Lil Nas X and Billy Ray Cyrus, which had 19 weeks at No. 1. This was beaten by Mariah Carey again with All I Want For Christmas Is You with 22 weeks.

== List ==
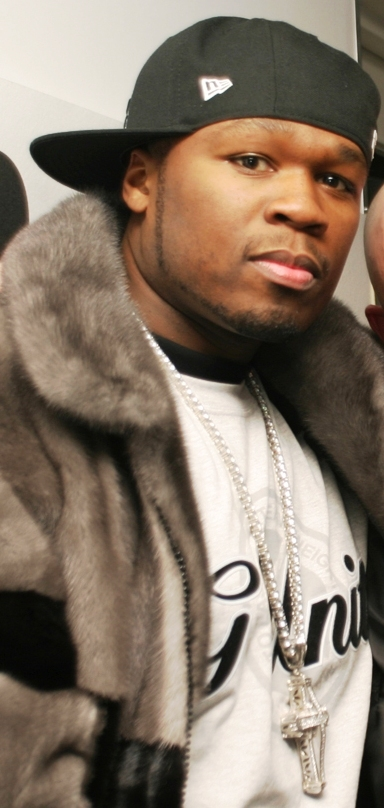
Rapper 50 Cent had six songs on the chart, five of them in the top 40, the highest one being "Candy Shop" at number eight.

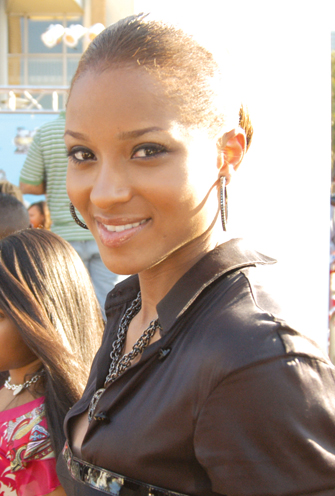
Singer Ciara had four songs in the top 40 of the chart, the highest one being "1, 2 Step" at number five.

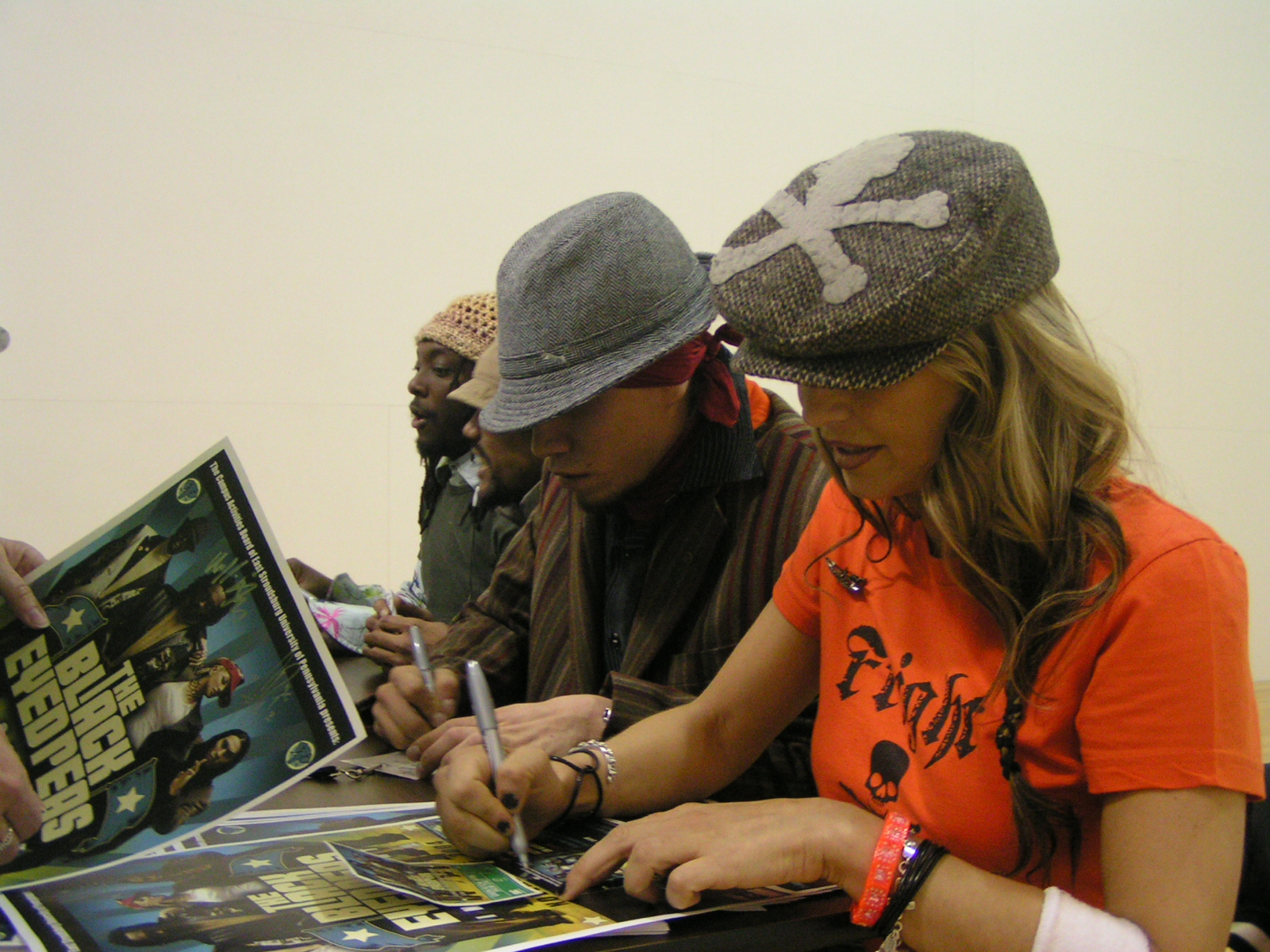
The Black Eyed Peas had three songs on the chart, two of which are in the top forty.

List of songs on Billboard's 2005 Year-End Hot 100 chart
No.	Title	Artist(s)
1	"We Belong Together"	Mariah Carey
2	"Hollaback Girl"	Gwen Stefani
3	"Let Me Love You"	Mario
4	"Since U Been Gone"	Kelly Clarkson
5	"1, 2 Step"	Ciara featuring Missy Elliott
6	"Gold Digger"	Kanye West featuring Jamie Foxx
7	"Boulevard of Broken Dreams"	Green Day
8	"Candy Shop"	50 Cent featuring Olivia
9	"Don't Cha"	The Pussycat Dolls featuring Busta Rhymes
10	"Behind These Hazel Eyes"	Kelly Clarkson
11	"Disco Inferno"	50 Cent
12	"You and Me"	Lifehouse
13	"Don't Phunk with My Heart"	The Black Eyed Peas
14	"Lose Control"	Missy Elliott featuring Ciara and Fatman Scoop
15	"Shake It Off"	Mariah Carey
16	"Mr. Brightside"	The Killers
17	"Just a Lil Bit"	50 Cent
18	"Pon de Replay"	Rihanna
19	"How We Do"	The Game featuring 50 Cent
20	"Beverly Hills"	Weezer
21	"Oh"	Ciara featuring Ludacris
22	"Lonely No More"	Rob Thomas
23	"Drop It Like It's Hot"	Snoop Dogg featuring Pharrell
24	"Hate It or Love It"	The Game featuring 50 Cent
25	"Lovers & Friends"	Lil Jon & the East Side Boyz featuring Usher and Ludacris
26	"Soldier"	Destiny's Child featuring T.I. and Lil Wayne
27	"Breakaway"	Kelly Clarkson
28	"Switch"	Will Smith
29	"Let Me Hold You"	Bow Wow featuring Omarion
30	"Like You"	Bow Wow featuring Ciara
31	"Rich Girl"	Gwen Stefani featuring Eve
32	"My Humps"	The Black Eyed Peas
33	"Obsession (No Es Amor)"	Frankie J featuring Baby Bash
34	"Caught Up"	Usher
35	"Listen to Your Heart"	DHT featuring Edmee
36	"Scars"	Papa Roach
37	"Feel Good Inc."	Gorillaz
38	"Let Me Go"	3 Doors Down
39	"Holiday"	Green Day
40	"Sugar, We're Goin Down"	Fall Out Boy
41	"Grind with Me"	Pretty Ricky
42	"Run It!"	Chris Brown featuring Juelz Santana
43	"Photograph"	Nickelback
44	"Lonely"	Akon
45	"Collide"	Howie Day
46	"Wake Me Up When September Ends"	Green Day
47	"Slow Down"	Bobby Valentino
48	"Over and Over"	Nelly featuring Tim McGraw
49	"Some Cut"	Trillville featuring Cutty
50	"Get It Poppin'"	Fat Joe featuring Nelly
51	"Play"	David Banner
52	"Soul Survivor"	Young Jeezy featuring Akon
53	"Pimpin' All Over the World"	Ludacris featuring Bobby Valentino
54	"My Boo"	Usher and Alicia Keys
55	"Sugar (Gimme Some)"	Trick Daddy featuring Ludacris, Lil' Kim and Cee Lo Green
56	"Karma"	Alicia Keys
57	"Speed of Sound"	Coldplay
58	"I Don't Want to Be"	Gavin DeGraw
59	"Mockingbird"	Eminem
60	"La Tortura"	Shakira featuring Alejandro Sanz
61	"She Will Be Loved"	Maroon 5
62	"Baby I'm Back"	Baby Bash featuring Akon
63	"Wait (The Whisper Song)"	Ying Yang Twins
64	"Incomplete"	Backstreet Boys
65	"Bring Em Out"	T.I.
66	"Cater 2 U"	Destiny's Child
67	"1 Thing"	Amerie
68	"Best of You"	Foo Fighters
69	"It's Like That"	Mariah Carey featuring Jermaine Dupri and Fatman Scoop
70	"Goin' Crazy"	Natalie
71	"Inside Your Heaven"	Carrie Underwood
72	"Because of You"	Kelly Clarkson
73	"Truth Is"	Fantasia
74	"Your Body"	Pretty Ricky
75	"Beautiful Soul"	Jesse McCartney
76	"Cool"	Gwen Stefani
77	"Get Back"	Ludacris
78	"Outta Control"	50 Cent featuring Mobb Deep
79	"U Don't Know Me"	T.I.
80	"These Words"	Natasha Bedingfield
81	"Don't Lie"	The Black Eyed Peas
82	"Get Right"	Jennifer Lopez
83	"Daughters"	John Mayer
84	"As Good as I Once Was"	Toby Keith
85	"Girlfight"	Brooke Valentine featuring Lil Jon and Big Boi
86	"Lose My Breath"	Destiny's Child
87	"Ordinary People"	John Legend
88	"We Be Burnin'"	Sean Paul
89	"Just the Girl"	The Click Five
90	"True"	Ryan Cabrera
91	"O"	Omarion
92	"Back Then"	Mike Jones
93	"Numb/Encore"	Jay-Z and Linkin Park
94	"Wonderful"	Ja Rule featuring R. Kelly and Ashanti
95	"I'm Sprung"	T-Pain
96	"Chariot"	Gavin DeGraw
97	"U Already Know"	112 featuring Foxy Brown
98	"Mississippi Girl"	Faith Hill
99	"Number One Spot"	Ludacris
100	"Give Me That"	Webbie featuring Bun B

== See also ==
- 2005 in music
- Billboard Year-End Hot R&B/Hip-Hop Songs of 2005
- Billboard Year-End Hot Rap Tracks of 2005
- List of Billboard Hot 100 number-one singles of 2005
- List of Billboard Hot 100 top-ten singles in 2005
