= List of number-one R&B singles of 2005 (U.S.) =

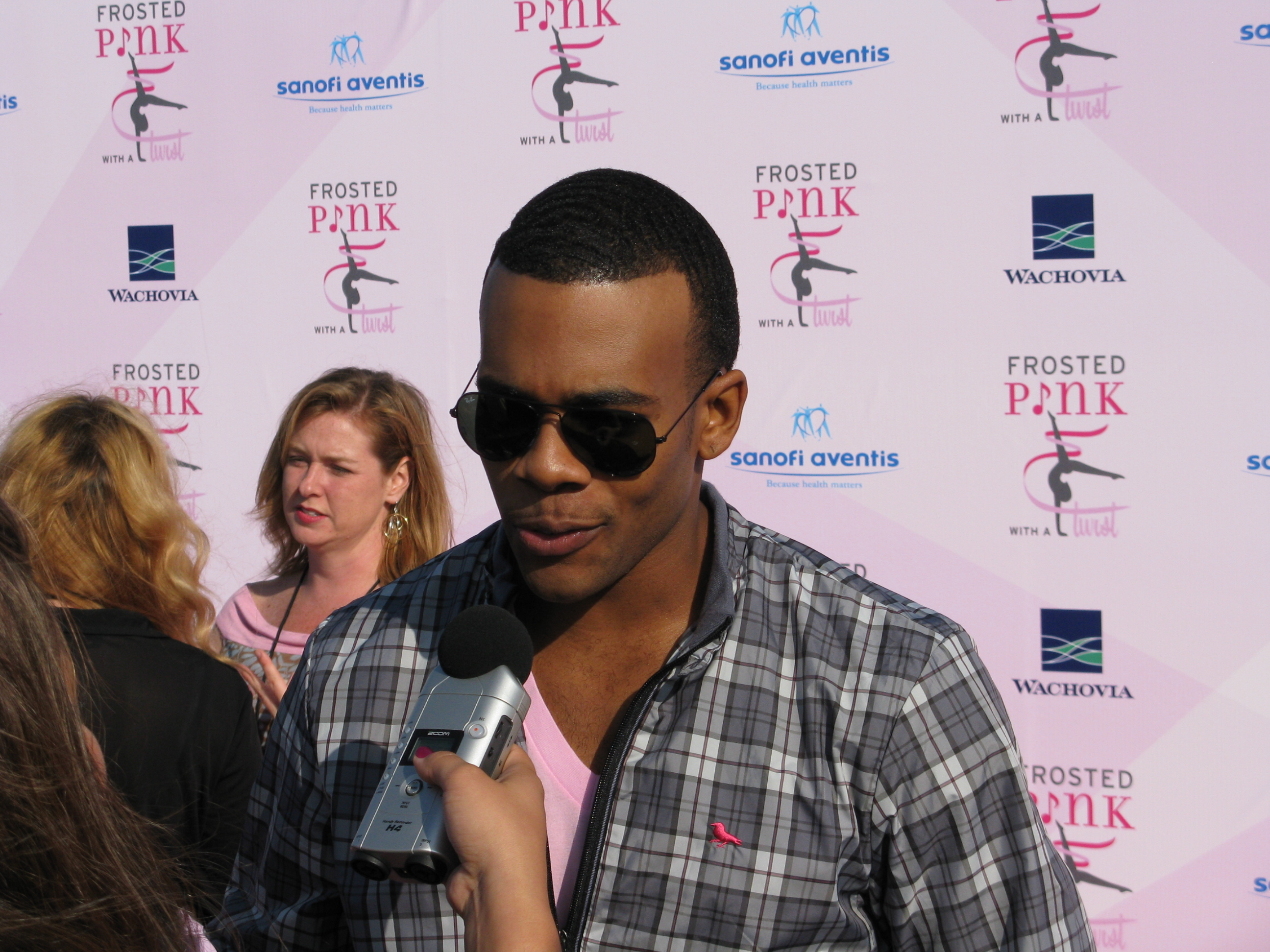
"Let Me Love You" by Mario reached number one on the first chart of 2005 and held the top spot for 11 weeks.

These are the Billboard R&B singles chart number-one singles of 2005.

== Chart history ==
Key
†	Indicates best-charting R&B single of 2005

Issue date	Song	Artist(s)
January 1	"Let Me Love You" †	Mario
January 8	"Let Me Love You" †	Mario
January 15	"Let Me Love You" †	Mario
January 22	"Let Me Love You" †	Mario
January 29	"Let Me Love You" †	Mario
February 5	"Let Me Love You" †	Mario
February 12	"Let Me Love You" †	Mario
February 19	"Let Me Love You" †	Mario
February 26	"Let Me Love You" †	Mario
March 5	"Let Me Love You" †	Mario
March 12	"Let Me Love You" †	Mario
March 19	"Candy Shop"	50 Cent featuring Olivia
March 26	"Candy Shop"	50 Cent featuring Olivia
April 2	"Candy Shop"	50 Cent featuring Olivia
April 9	"Candy Shop"	50 Cent featuring Olivia
April 16	"Hate It or Love It"	The Game featuring 50 Cent
April 23	"Hate It or Love It"	The Game featuring 50 Cent
April 30	"1 Thing"	Amerie
May 7	"Slow Down"	Bobby Valentino
May 14	"Slow Down"	Bobby Valentino
May 21	"Slow Down"	Bobby Valentino
May 28	"Slow Down"	Bobby Valentino
June 4	"We Belong Together"	Mariah Carey
June 11	"We Belong Together"	Mariah Carey
June 18	"We Belong Together"	Mariah Carey
June 25	"We Belong Together"	Mariah Carey
July 2	"We Belong Together"	Mariah Carey
July 9	"We Belong Together"	Mariah Carey
July 16	"We Belong Together"	Mariah Carey
July 23	"We Belong Together"	Mariah Carey
July 30	"We Belong Together"	Mariah Carey
August 6	"We Belong Together"	Mariah Carey
August 13	"We Belong Together"	Mariah Carey
August 20	"We Belong Together"	Mariah Carey
August 27	"We Belong Together"	Mariah Carey
September 3	"We Belong Together"	Mariah Carey
September 10	"Like You"	Bow Wow featuring Ciara
September 17	"Like You"	Bow Wow featuring Ciara
September 24	"Gold Digger"	Kanye West featuring Jamie Foxx
October 1	"Gold Digger"	Kanye West featuring Jamie Foxx
October 8	"Gold Digger"	Kanye West featuring Jamie Foxx
October 15	"Gold Digger"	Kanye West featuring Jamie Foxx
October 22	"Soul Survivor"	Young Jeezy featuring Akon
October 29	"Soul Survivor"	Young Jeezy featuring Akon
November 5	"Soul Survivor"	Young Jeezy featuring Akon
November 12	"Soul Survivor"	Young Jeezy featuring Akon
November 19	"Run It!"	Chris Brown
November 26	"Run It!"	Chris Brown
December 3	"I Think They Like Me"	Dem Franchize Boyz featuring Jermaine Dupri, Da Brat and Bow Wow
December 10	"I Think They Like Me"	Dem Franchize Boyz featuring Jermaine Dupri, Da Brat and Bow Wow
December 17	"I Think They Like Me"	Dem Franchize Boyz featuring Jermaine Dupri, Da Brat and Bow Wow
December 24	"Don't Forget About Us"	Mariah Carey
December 31	"Don't Forget About Us"	Mariah Carey

== See also ==
- 2005 in music
- Billboard Year-End Hot R&B/Hip-Hop Songs of 2005
- List of number-one R&B hits (United States)
