= Destiny Lightsy =

American actress, singer and dancer

Destiny Lightsy is an American actress, singer and dancer who serves as the co-host for the third season of MTV's reality game show Yo Momma, hosted by Wilmer Valderrama.

== Career ==
Destiny has appeared in the movies You Got Served, Fat Albert and Pissed. She also served as a dancer for Ciara and was featured in Usher's Yeah! video as well as the documentary 'Rize' about various forms of dance. She was also featured in Chris Brown's "Run It!" video.
