= List of Yo Momma episodes =

The following is a complete list of episodes for the television series Yo Momma on MTV.

== Season 1 ==
Episode	Title	Summary	Air Date
1	Long Beach vs. Riverside	Long Beach and Riverside battle it out for a spot in the weeks final and win $1000 in cash.	April 3, 2006
2	Downtown L.A vs. Hollywood	The guys from Downtown L.A and the guys from Hollywood compete to get to the main event for a chance to win $1000 in cash money and the right to go to the best of the week.	April 4, 2006
3	Beach vs. The Valley	The guys from the Beach and from the Valley battle for a spot in the nights finale and some cash money, also they get a spot in the weeks final battle to be called the best trash talker of the week.	April 5, 2006
4	Echo Park vs, Orange County	The guys from Echo Park and the guys from Orange County compete to get to the main event for a chance to win $1000 in cash money and the right to go to the best of the week.	April 6, 2006
5	Best of the Week No. 1	The winners from this week's main events come back to win the best trash talker of the week, they walk away with $1000 in cash, and some more prizes.	April 7, 2006
6	Whittier vs. Venice	Mike from Venice and J Smooth from Whittier stepped up and won the right to go to the nights final and a chance to go to the final of the week for a chance at another $1000. Mike won in Venice and went to the nights finale and won the right to go to Friday nights main event.	April 10, 2006
7	Torrance vs. East LA	The guys and girls battle in their hoods for a right to go to the nights finale for a chance to win a thousand dollars and a chance to go to the finale of the week. The guys from Torrance and East L.A had very different sides but there was only one winner.	April 11, 2006
8	Compton vs. Eagle Rock	The guys from Compton and Eagle Rock compete against each other for a chance to go to the nights main event for a chance at a $1,000 in cash.	April 12, 2006
9	Reseda vs. Downey	The guys from L.A's hoods Reseda and Downey battle for a chance to get to the nights main event for a $1,000 and a chance to get to the weeks final for another $1,000 and more prizes.	April 13, 2006
10	Best of the Week No. 2	The winners from the past nights came back for a chance at another $1,000 and more prizes and the right to be called the best trash talker of the week.	April 14, 2006
11	Inglewood vs. Panorama City	The guys from 2 L.A hoods battle it out for a chance to go to the nights final for some cash and the right to go to the best of the week.	April 17, 2006
12	El Segundo vs. Northridge	El Segundo and Northridge battled for the right to the nights main event and a spot in the best of the week trash talkers.	April 18, 2006
13	Baldwin Hills vs. Lincoln Heights	The guys from two L.A hoods battle for a chance at the nights main event and a spot in the weeks best trasher talkers battle.	April 19, 2006
14	Culver City vs. Ladera Heights	The guys and girls from two L.A hoods battle for a spot in the nights finale for a chance to get $1,000 in cash and the right to go to the weeks best trash talkers final.	April 20, 2006
15	Best of the Week No. 3	The winners from the past night come back for the final battle for a chance at $1,000 and some additional prizes and the right to be called the best trash talker of the week.	April 21, 2006
16	North Hollywood vs. Van Nuys	Two L.A hoods battle for the right to be called the best trash talker of the night and some cash money also a ticket to the weeks final battle.	April 24, 2006
17	Hawthorne vs. Los Feliz	The guys from two L.A hoods come center stage to battle for a right to the nights main event and a chance to win some money. Also they get a chance to go to the weeks best of the week to become the best trash talker of the week.	April 25, 2006
18	Crenshaw vs, West Covina	The guys from Crenshaw and West Covina battle for a spot in the nights main event and a chance for $1,000 in cash.	April 26, 2006
19	Chatsworth vs. Highland Park	Chatsworth and Highland Park battle for spots in the night's main event and a chance to go to the best of the weeks for $1,000 in cash and the right to be called the week's best trash talker.	April 27, 2006
20	Best of the Week No. 4	The winners from the weeks main events come back for the best of the week for a chance of a $1,000 in cash and some other prizes and the right to be called the weeks best trash talker.	April 28, 2006
21	Best of L.A - Season Finale	Chuck from the Valley, Harp from North Hollywood, D-Redd from Northridge and Vakisha from Compton all come back for another shot to win and this time to be called the Best of L.A.	June 15, 2006

== Season 2 ==
Episode	Title	Summary	Air Date
22	Bed Stuy vs. Brooklyn Heights	In the second-season premiere Yo Momma takes it to New York City. Bed Stuy and Brooklyn Heights battle it out for $1000 cash money.	October 23, 2006
23	Flatbush vs. Williamsburg	The guys from Flatbush and Williamsburg battle it out for the top spot and $1000 cash money.	October 24, 2006
24	Bay Ridge vs. Bensonhurst	The guys from Bay Ridge and Bensonhurst throw it down to see who will get a spot in the final battle and move on to the Best of Brooklyn.	October 25, 2006
25	Sunset Park vs. Coney Island	The best players from Sunset Park and Coney Island battle it out to see who will move on to tonights finale and ultimately to the Best of Brooklyn.	October 26, 2006
26	Best of Brooklyn	The four winners of the week all come back and face each other to see who will win $1000 cash money and be called the Best of Brooklyn.	October 26, 2006
27	East Village vs. Upper West Side	The East Village and the Upper West Side joke 'til they choke competing for a spot in the night's final battle. They both had very different styles, and one of them moves on to the Best of Manhattan.	October 30, 2006
28	Tribeca vs. Times Square	The guys and gals of 2 New York hoods battle their way to the top of the line. Two were chosen to go on to the final round and there they battled for $1000 and the right to go to the Best of Manhattan.	October 31, 2006
29	Hell's Kitchen vs. Harlem	The heat from Hell's Kitchen and the ballers in Harlem bring it down for $1000 cash money and the chance to win another $1000 at the Best of Manhattan.	November 1, 2006
30	Alphabet City vs. Washington Heights	Alphabet City spells it out and Washington Heights takes it down for the top spot in the night's final battle. The players are here to prove they got what it takes to win $1000 cash money. '	November 2, 2006
31	The Best of Manhattan	Manhattan is taken by storm as the four winners of the week return and battle it out to be crowned the Best of Manhattan and win $1000 cash money and other prizes.	November 2, 2006
32	Woodlawn vs. South Bronx	The players from Woodlawn and South Bronx throw it down for a spot in the night's final battle and $1000 cash money.	November 6, 2006
33	Wakefield vs. Riverdale	Wakefield and Riverdale came straight out of their 'hoods and into the battleground where only one would emerge victorious and win $1000 cash money and the right to go up against the Best of the Bronx.	November 7, 2006
34	Eastchester vs. Pelham Bay	The guys and gals of Eastchester and Pelham Bay battle it out to make it to the top. The winner goes home with the pride of their hood and $1000 cash money.	November 8, 2006
35	Throgs Neck vs. Morris Park	Straight outta 2 NYC hoods comes 2 competitors throwing it down to become the best of the night. They both had very different styles, but only one could move on to the Best of the Bronx and win $1000 cash money.	November 9, 2006
36	Best of the Bronx	Four of the week's best trash talkers get ready for a rumble in the Bronx. The winner receives the rights to advance to the Best of NYC and another $1000 cash money with some more prizes.	November 9, 2006
37	Jamaica vs. Astoria	This week, Wilmer and his crew explore Queens to find the illest trash talkers throughout New York. The cats from Jamaica hook up with Sam as they freestyle it out to find out who represents them in the final battle. In Astoria, Jason is on a search to find out the best trash talker to represent Astoria in the battle vs. Jamaica as the two finalists compete for $1000 cash and the chance to battle with the 3 other winners in Best of Queens.	November 13, 2006
38	Hollis vs. Flushing	After touring the Bronx, Wilmer and his boys went to Queens. They went to Hollis and Flushing to find the ones with the best trash talking skills. Sam went to Hollis to find the best disser there so they can represent the town in a final battle. Jason went to Flushing and found the best out of there. Now, the two compete in a final battle to see who is the better trash talker, the $1000 cash, and the chance to compete in Best of Queens with the 3 other winners.	November 14, 2006
39	Cambria Heights vs. Jackson Heights	On the streets of New York, Wilmer, Sam, and Jason look for the best trash talkers. This time, they hit the towns in Queens. Sam goes out to Jackson Heights to find out who the best trash talker is there. While Jason hits the streets of Cambria Heights to look for the one with the best trash talking skills there. The two battle it out to see which one has the better trash talking skills. The winner is awarded with $1000 cash and the chance to become the Best of Queens.	November 15, 2006
40	Richmond Hill vs. Forest Hills	Once again, Wilmer and his crew hit the streets of New York to find the best trash talkers. Sam hits the streets of Richmond Hill to find their best trash talker. While Jason goes to Forest Hills to find a representative there so the two can battle it out. The winner gets $1,000 cash and gets to battle in Best of Queens.	November 16, 2006
41	Best of Queens	Wilmer and his crew are going throughout New York to find the best trash talkers. This week, they were in Queens. They found four people with great trash talking skills: Aaron, BGB, Aiesha, and Fudge. Now, Wilmer plans to put them together and find out who is the best trash talker in Queens.	November 16, 2006
42	Best of New York	After searching for the Best Trash-talkers of 4 boroughs in New York, Wilmer Valderrama unites them as they battle it out to find who is the Best of New York.	May 13, 2007

== Season 3 ==
Episode	Title	Summary	Air Date
43	College Park vs. Union City	Wilmer's back. Now, he's in Atlanta, and to kick off the season, his crew, Jason and Destiny went to two different towns in ATL. Jason went to College Park to find he trash talkers there while Destiny went to Union City to see the best disser there. After, the two winners will face off for $1000 in cash and advancement to Best of the Week.	May 13, 2007
44	Marietta vs, Jonesboro	Wilmer drops by in ATL to find the best trash talkers. This time, Jason goes down to Marietta and Destiny goes to Jonesboro. They'll find the 2 best trash talkers there and have them battle it out for $1000 in cash and the advancement to Best of the week.	May 13, 2007
45	Ben Hill vs. Cabbagetown	Wilmer sends Jason to Ben Hill and Destiny to Cabbagetown to find the best trash talkers in those hoods. It was a close battle, but only one would emerge as the winner and receive $1000 cash money and the chance to go up against the Best of the Week.	May 13, 2007
46	Dunwoody vs. Southside	The guys and gals of two Atlanta hoods met up with Jason and Destiny to prove they had what it takes to be Atlanta's best trash talker. The winner gets $1000 cash money and the chance to prove themselves at the Best of the Week.	May 13, 2007
47	Best of Week 1	The four winners of the week come back and face each other in a battle to see who will be facing the Best of Atlanta.	June 15, 2007
48	Decatur vs. Westside	Destiny and Jason search two Atlanta hoods to find the best trash-talker. Two stepped up to prove they were the best of their hood but only one would move on to the Best of the Week.	May 13, 2007
49	Kirkwood vs. Lawrenceville	The guys and gals of two Atlanta hoods face off in a battle that pits them against each other to find out which one of them is the best trash-talker. The winner gets $1000 and the chance to battle the Best of the Week.	May 13, 2007
50	Alpharetta vs. Buckhead	Alpharetta and Buckhead are pitted against each other for an unbelievable battle. Only one would move on to the Best of the Week and receive $1000 cash money.	June 20, 2007
51	Bankhead vs. Eastpoint	The trash-talkers of Atlanta are at it again as two new players battle for their hoods. A little visit from Mother Fine, East Point's oldest trash-talker, was just one of the many highlights of this episode.	May 13, 2007
52	Best of the Week No. 2	Wilmer has been searching for the best trash talkers all week. Four of them stood out and moved on to best of the week. Now, Wil has them battle it out to see who is the best of this week.	June 22, 2007
53	Downtown vs. Riverdale	Will is on a search to find the best trash talkers of Atlanta. He sent out Jason and Destiny to help him. They go to Downtown and Riverdale to look for trash talkers. Then, they find the best trashtalker out of each town, and have the ultimate battle to see who will move on to best of the week.	June 25, 2007
54	Lithonia vs. Duluth	Wilmers in Atlanta, looking for the greatest trash talkers there. He sent out Jason and Destiny to Lithonia and Duluth. In those hoods, they look for the greatest trash talkers and have one represent each hood in a final battle for $1000 in cash.	June 26, 2007
55	Dallas vs. Columbus	Wilmer sends out Jason and Destiny to Dallas and Columbus to find the Best Trash Talker out of each hood.	June 27, 2007
56	Midtown vs. Little Five Points	Wilmer sends out Jason and Destiny to Midtown and Little Five Points to find one person, with the best trash talking skills, to represent each hood in the final battle fr $1000 cash	June 28, 2007
57	Best of the Week No. 3	Wilmer sends out Jason and Destiny to Midtown and Little Five Points to find one person, with the best trash talking skills, to represent each hood in the final battle fr $1000 cash	June 29, 2007
58	West End vs. Northside	Wilmer sends Jason to Northside and Destiny to West End to see which hood has the better trash talkers.	July 2, 2007
59	Douglasville vs. Clarkston	Wilmer sends Jason and Destiny to find the best trash talker out of each hood. The best out of Douglasville goes against the best of Clarkston to see who the better trash talker is.	July 3, 2007
60	Stone Mountain vs. Underground	The best trash talker out of Stone Mountain goes against the best of Underground to see who is the better trash talker.	July 4, 2007
61	Eastside vs. Forest Park	Eastside's finest goes against the best out of Forest Park to see who is the better trash talker.	July 5, 2007
62	Best of the Week No. 4	Wilmer has this week's winners battle it out to see who is the best of this week	July 6, 2007
63	Best of Atlanta	Atlanta's finest are back to see who is the best of Atlanta. Will it be Navv? E-Man? Pak Attack? or S.E.M.E.?	?
