= Fidel Cashflow 2006 =

Fidel Cashflow 2006: The New Regime

Mixtape by DJ Clue?
- Released: April 11, 2006
- Recorded: 2006
- Genre: Hip hop
- Label: Bcd Music Group
- Producer: DJ Clue?

DJ Clue? chronology
| The Professional Part 2 (2004) | Fidel Cashflow 2006: The New Regime (2006) | The Professional Part 3 (2006) |

Fidel Cashflow 2006 is a mixtape by Queens DJ & producer DJ Clue?.

== Track listing ==
| # | Title | Featured guest(s) |
|---|---|---|
| 1 | "DJ Clue? Intro" | |
| 2 | "Jadakiss - Ms. Jackson (50 Cent Diss)" | Styles P. |
| 3 | "Ransom (A-Team) - You Don't Want That" | Fabolous |
| 4 | "Mobb Deep - Do That Dance" | Big Noyd |
| 5 | "Fabolous - What Cha'all Want" | |
| 6 | "Nas - Escobar 2006" | |
| 7 | Stack Bundles - Bundles Hot Now" | |
| 8 | "The Game - Dear Mr. President" | |
| 9 | "Desert Storm - When Animals Attack" | Ransom (A-Team), Stack Bundles, & Joe Buddens |
| 10 | "Red Cafe - Bling Blao Part 2" | Fabolous & Paul Wall |
| 11 | "The Game - 240 Bars (G-Unit Diss)" | |
| 12 | "50 Cent - Not Rich, Still Lyin (The Game Diss)" | |
| 13 | Gravy - 40/40" | |
| 14 | "Stack Bundles - Talkin All That" | |
| 15 | "Styles P. - Favorite Drug" | |
| 16 | "Mariah Carey - Don't Forget About Us Part 2 (Desert Storm Remix)" | Fabolous & Styles P |
| 17 | "Chris Brown - Yo! (Desert Storm Remix)" | Ransom (A-Team) |
| 18 | "Magnificent (Desert Storm South) - Tip Down Freestyle" | |
| 19 | "Rick Ro$$ - Hustlin (Remix)" | Busta Rhymes |
| 20 | "Mobb Deep - Put Em On Ya Waist" | |
| 21 | "DJ Clue?" - Outro | |
