= Billboard Year-End Hot Rap Tracks of 2005 =

2005 American music chart

This is a list of Billboard magazine's Top Hot Rap Tracks of 2005.

No.	Title	Artist(s)
1	"Lovers and Friends"	Lil Jon & the East Side Boyz featuring Ludacris and Usher
2	"Drop It Like It's Hot"	Snoop Dogg featuring Pharrell
3	"How We Do"	The Game featuring 50 Cent
4	"Candy Shop"	50 Cent featuring Olivia
5	"Disco Inferno"	50 Cent
6	"Gold Digger"	Kanye West featuring Jamie Foxx
7	"Just a Lil Bit"	50 Cent
8	"Like You"	Bow Wow featuring Ciara
9	"Let Me Hold You"	Bow Wow featuring Omarion
10	"Hate It or Love It"	The Game featuring 50 Cent
11	"Some Cut"	Trillville featuring Cutty
12	"Wait (The Whisper Song)"	Ying Yang Twins
13	"Grind with Me"	Pretty Ricky
14	"Bring Em Out"	T.I.
15	"Play"	David Banner
16	"Soul Survivor"	Young Jeezy featuring Akon
17	"U Don't Know Me"	T.I.
18	"Lose Control"	Missy Elliott featuring Ciara and Fatman Scoop
19	"Pimpin' All Over the World"	Ludacris featuring Bobby Valentino
20	"Give Me That"	Webbie featuring Bun B
21	"Wonderful"	Ja Rule featuring R. Kelly and Ashanti
22	"Karma"	Lloyd Banks featuring Avant
23	"Get Back"	Ludacris
24	"Badd"	Ying Yang Twins featuring Mike Jones and Mr. Collipark
25	"Outta Control"	50 Cent featuring Mobb Deep

== See also ==
- 2005 in music
- Billboard Year-End Hot 100 singles of 2005
- Billboard Year-End Hot R&B/Hip-Hop Songs of 2005
- List of Billboard number-one rap singles of 2005
