= Yo Momma (TV series) =

American reality television game show

- Genre: Reality television game show
- Created by: Wilmer Valderrama
- Presented by: Wilmer Valderrama; Jason Everhart; Sam Sarpong (Seasons 1 and 2); Destiny Lightsy (Season 3)
- Starring: Wilmer Valderrama
- Narrated by: Big Boy
- Opening theme: "Yo' Mama" (remix) by The Pharcyde
- Country of origin: United States
- Original language: English
- No. of seasons: 3
- No. of episodes: 64 (list of episodes)

Production
- Executive producers: Dean Minerd, Rod Aissa, Wilmer Valderrama
- Producers: Lisa Lettunich, Jonathan Cane, Ross Breitenbach,
- Running time: 30 minutes

Original release
- Network: MTV
- Release: April 3, 2006 – December 27, 2007

Yo Momma is an American television show based upon jokes insulting one's mother. Creators, executive producers and hosts are Wilmer Valderrama, along with Sam Sarpong (Seasons 1 and 2), Jason Everhart and Destiny Lightsy. The show was produced from April 2006 to December 2007, and, as the title suggests, used "yo momma" jokes; many episodes featured guest appearances from rappers. Yo Momma was parodied in the 2008 spoof movie Meet the Spartans in a brief scene where the Spartans engage in a battle of "yo momma" jokes with a crowd of people dressed in a manner that are similar to the show's contestants.

- Season 1 was in Los Angeles
- season 2 was in New York City
- season 3 was in Atlanta.

== The Yo Momma Online Network ==
In conjunction with Yo Momma, MTV launched YoMomma.tv, a Web 2.0 community dedicated to increasing viewer engagement with the program and heavily promoted during Yo Momma episodes. Site users construct a profile and upload their own yo momma jokes (or "disses"), and attempt to boost their rankings on the site by challenging other users to "Battles", exchanges of uploaded disses between two users. The user community votes on both disses and Battles.

A corollary feature is "Let's Bully", which allows users to send insults over e-mail using an avatar of the user's face superimposed over modifiable clip art. The Let's Bully feature was the subject of an article in Adweek Magazine.
