= Don't Forget About Us =

2005 single by Mariah Carey

Single by Mariah Carey

from the album The Emancipation of Mimi: Ultra Platinum Edition
- B-side: "Shake It Off" (remix)
- Released: October 10, 2005
- Recorded: 2005
- Studio: Honeywest (New York City); Southside (Atlanta, Georgia)
- Genre: R&B; hip-hop soul
- Length: 3:53
- Label: Island
- Songwriters: Mariah Carey; Jermaine Mauldin; Bryan-Michael Cox; Johntá Austin
- Producers: Mariah Carey; Jermaine Dupri

Mariah Carey singles chronology
"Get Your Number" (2005)	"Don't Forget About Us" (2005)	"So Lonely" (2006)

Music video
- "Don't Forget About Us" on YouTube

"Don't Forget About Us" is a song by American singer Mariah Carey. It was written by Carey, Jermaine Dupri, Bryan-Michael Cox and Johntá Austin, and produced by Carey and Dupri. On October 10, 2005, it was released as the lead single from the reissue of her tenth studio album, The Emancipation of Mimi: Ultra Platinum Edition (2005). The song is influenced by R&B and hip-hop soul music genres, and lyrically chronicles the emotions felt by the protagonist after the loss of their relationship. Carey explained that the true meaning of the song is to be interpreted by the listener, therefore not disclosing its entire meaning publicly.

The song received generally positive reviews from music critics, with many heavily comparing it to Carey's previous single "We Belong Together". Several reviewers felt the song's similarity marked Carey's lack of creativity with it, while others embraced its radio-friendly formula. "Don't Forget About Us" became Carey's seventeenth chart topping single on the US Billboard Hot 100, tying the record for most number-one singles by a solo artist set by Elvis Presley 36 years before. Internationally, the song topped the charts in Finland, and reached the top-ten in Hungary.

Carey performed the song at the 33rd Annual American Music Awards, and during the half-time of the Thanksgiving game between the Detroit Lions and the Atlanta Falcons. Additionally, the song was included on the set-lists of Carey's The Adventures of Mimi and Angels Advocate Tours. The song's music video chronicles the two time frames, Carey in the present, as well as the past memories she shared with her ex-lover that continue to haunt her. "Don't Forget About Us" was nominated for two awards at the 49th Annual Grammy Awards held on February 11, 2007.

== Background and release ==
After being branded Carey's "comeback album" by music critics, and becoming the highest selling album of her career post-Glitter (2001), The Emancipation of Mimi inspired Carey to return to the studio, in hopes of writing and producing new material for her next studio album. During a writing session with Jermaine Dupri, Carey wrote "Don't Forget About Us" as a possible single for her next album, reminiscent of the material on The Emancipation of Mimi. After hearing the unfinished version of the song, L.A. Reid, CEO at the time of Carey's label Island Records, was very satisfied with the song. He convinced Carey to continue writing and producing new songs, and suggested on re-releasing the album, which had already sold over four million units in the United States alone. Carey agreed to the idea of re-releasing The Emancipation of Mimi, feeling eager to release the song, as well as other material to her fans, instead of making them wait for a brand new album. In an interview with MTV News, Carey discussed the decision of releasing the song immediately, as well as the re-release of the album:

'Don't Forget About Us' was a song that Jermaine [Dupri] and I started writing and didn't finish, and L.A. Reid heard it. He was excited about it and he was like, 'We should re-release the album. I agreed because were trying to figure out what to do with the song because we loved it so much, and we didn't want to wait until the next album to send it to radio.

After completing the song, Carey announced on October 13, 2005, via her official website, that she would be re-releasing The Emancipation of Mimi. Additionally, she explained how the album would contain four new songs, and would be promoted internationally by the new single, "Don't Forget About Us". The song was released throughout the globe as the fifth official single from The Emancipation of Mimi, and the first from the re-release, tentatively titled, Ultra Platinum Edition. The song was first serviced to American contemporary hit, rhythmic contemporary, and urban contemporary radio stations on October 10, 2005. In Australia, a CD single was issued on December 5, 2005. The following Monday, on December 12, a CD single was issued in the United Kingdom. On January 27, 2006, a CD was released in Austria and Germany. A release in Italy followed on February 6 and in Taiwan on February 17. On January 29, 2021, an EP was issued.

== Composition ==
"Don't Forget About Us"
A sample of the song's chorus, featuring the protagonists growing desperation and yearning. Critics noted a similar production and instrumentation pattern to "We Belong Together", which also derived its sound from finger-snaps, kick drums and a strong piano-driven melody.

"Don't Forget About Us" is a mid-tempo song lasting three minutes and fifty-three seconds, while drawing influence from pop and R&B with downtempo beats music genres. Written by Carey, Jermaine Dupri, Bryan-Michael Cox and Johntá Austin, and produced by the former two, the song drew comparisons to Carey's "We Belong Together". According to Michael Paoletta from Billboard, the song features a similar tempo, lyrical style, instrumentation and production as the latter song, and incorporates a reminiscent vocal performance from Carey. The song is in the key of B♭ major and has a "moderately slow" tempo of 72 beats per minute. Carey's vocal range spans three octaves and six semitones from the low-note of D_{3} to the high-note of A♭_{6}. Lyrically, the song describes the potency of a "first love", and features a protagonist pleading to her lover to "not forget about them". Critics noted that the song's lyrics both let go of a lover, as well as cherishing their memory. Carey sings, "You just let it die / With no goodbyes", indicating a relationship that has long decayed, and how she has let it drift away, while also adding, "There's only one me and you / And how we used to shine / No matter what you go through / We are one, that's a fact that you can't deny", indicating that while they are no longer together, she will continue to cherish the memory of them and how strong their love was. According to Carey, she refrained from giving away too much of the song's lyrical meaning, in order to allow fans to possibly interpret the song in their own way:

I try not to get too specific so that people can apply the lyrics to their own lives. When I was growing up and listening to the radio and I would hear a song that reminded me of a certain person or a situation or whatever, I would want to be able to completely connect it to that moment. And then if I heard someone explaining it and making it into something totally different, it ruined it for me. So I kind of like to keep it open for people's imaginations. It evokes something different depending on who listens to it and at what time. "Don't Forget About Us" could give you a good, happy memory, or you could be miserable, crying, listening to it over and over. All in all, I think it's good to have music you can live vicariously through, and that's what a lot of people have told me this record has been for them.

== Critical reception ==
"Don't Forget About Us" garnered generally positive reviews from music critics, though many compared it to, and felt it shared several similarities with Carey's previous single, "We Belong Together". Bill Lamb from About.com rated the song four out of five stars, who while noting the song's careful formula, complimented Carey's more mature and lower range vocals: "Mariah is clearly settling into a more mature style and lower range vocals than in her early career." Additionally, Lamb commented that although not as "strong" as "We Belong Together", the song was marginally better than another single from The Emancipation of Mimi, "Shake It Off". Billboard's Michael Paoletta drew heavy comparisons to "We Belong Together", noting the song's similar tempo, lyrical style, instrumentation and vocal stamp. He commented that although "Don't Forget About Us" was "satisfying" on its own, it suggested that Carey had hit a creative wall. Andre Meyer from CBC News described the song as "stronger" than anything Carey released from 2001 to 2005, and wrote "[It] cops the jittery R&B vibe that made Destiny's Child so potent." Reviewers from The New Yorker and Music Week were both taken aback by the single, calling it "beautiful" and "gentle", respectively. Todd Martens from the Los Angeles Times compared it heavily to Carey's 2008 single "Bye Bye", describing their piano melody as "a close match". In 2007, "Don't Forget About Us" was nominated for two Grammy Awards, in the "Best Female R&B Vocal Performance" and "Best R&B Song" categories, although not winning either.

== Chart performance ==
"Don't Forget About Us" was released as the fourth international single from The Emancipation of Mimi (2005), and the first from its re-release, the Ultra Platinum Edition. The song reached the top of the Billboard Hot 100 in its eleventh week, spending two consecutive weeks at the position. "Don't Forget About Us" became Carey's 17th chart-topping single in the United States, tying the record set by Elvis Presley for most number-one singles by a solo artist (Carey has since surpassed this record with "Touch My Body" in 2008 and "All I Want for Christmas is You" in 2019.) Currently, the only act to hold more US number-one singles than Carey are The Beatles, who gained twenty throughout their career while Carey has accumulated 19 to date. "Don't Forget About Us" stayed in the top forty for eighteen weeks and reached number one on other Billboard component charts, including the Hot R&B/Hip-Hop Songs. The song was certified Platinum by the Recording Industry Association of America (RIAA), denoting shipments of over 1,000,000 units.

Outside the United States, the song achieved moderate international charting. In Australia, "Don't Forget About Us" debuted at its peak position of number twelve on the singles chart, during the week of December 18, 2005. In its second week, the song stalled at number twelve, before beginning its eleven-week descent on the chart. In Finland, "Don't Forget About Us" peaked at number one, becoming Carey's second number-one single in that country and first since "Anytime You Need a Friend" (1994). On the Italian singles charts, the song charted for only one week, peaking at number eleven. In both the Wallonian and Flemish territories in Belgium, the song peaked at numbers two and one, although plummeting outside the top-fifty the following week. On the Dutch Top 40 chart, "Don't Forget About Us" debuted at number ninety-two during the week dated February 2, 2006. Spending one week at its peak position of number four, the song dropped to thirty-two the following week. In New Zealand, it peaked at number twelve, and spent a total of four weeks fluctuating in the singles chart. Similarly on February 26, 2006, the song debuted and peaked at number nineteen on the Swiss Singles Chart, and spent a total of five weeks on the chart. On the UK Singles Chart week dated December 12, 2005, "Don't Forget About Us" began its seven-week run at its peak of number eleven.

== Music video ==
=== Background ===
The music video for "Don't Forget About Us" features Carey re-enacting the pool scene from Monroe's unreleased film Something's Got to Give (pictured).

Filmed in Los Angeles, the music video reunited Carey with Paul Hunter, director of the video for her 1997 single, "Honey". Since its release, Carey claimed it to be one of her favorite videos, due to its complex scenery and fun nature. She explained that she had wanted to work with Hunter again for some time, and was happy to be able to film another music video alongside him. In an interview with MTV News, Carey described her feelings regarding the video, as well as sentiments towards the video's director, Hunter: "But I was so happy to work with him again 'cause ever since 'Honey' I've been trying to relive the splendor of that moment. It's more of just a plain beauty piece with sentimental overtones, but it was great to work with Paul again." Following a tale of love and separation, the video alternates between two different time frames. The first of these involves a tearful Carey in the present, while the second invokes memories of a relationship with a former lover (played by Dolce & Gabbana model Christian Monzon). When questioned regarding a possible relationship with Monzon, Carey said "Erm, how do we play this? OK, he's a very nice guy, he's been in a fabulous Dolce & Gabbana advert - did you see it? And we've had some nice conversations and, um, a nice time. OK, I'll say he definitely did a very good job in the video." Additionally, Carey and Hunter placed several secrets within the video's scenery, that would be intended for the "die-hard fans". Following the video's completion, it premiered on MTV and several other music video channels on November 1, 2005. Aside from the video's script, Carey channeled Marilyn Monroe, one of her icons growing up. During a pool scene, Carey re-enacts a part from Monroe's film Something's Got to Give (1962). In an interview with MTV News, Carey spoke of the re-enactment:

That shot was totally and completely inspired by 'Something's Got to Give,' Marilyn Monroe's last movie that never got finished. It's an homage to her, because I've never seen anyone re-create it. So many people have emulated so many of Marilyn's classic moments, but it's just that I'm a big fan of hers, and I thought it was really pretty at night with the pool. No one could ever be as fabulous as Marilyn was, but it's in honor and homage to her.

=== Synopsis ===
The music video chronicles two alternative time frames, with the first of Carey in the present, tearful and remorseful their separation, while the other of several different past memories in which she shared with her lover. The video begins with Carey wearing a long brown blouse, laying on a sofa in an elegantly furnished home. As the song begins, she stands up and walks around the living room, while remembering and lamenting her failed relationship. As the first memory of Carey and her lover together on a soccer field is shown, she is once again shown in the present, however clothed in a large white sweater while tears trickle down her cheek. As the memory continues of that night on the soccer field, they are seen together, caressing each other and holding each other in a tight embrace. Carey, in the present, makes her way into a heated pool, where she lays her leg on the deck, re-enacting a famed scene from Marilyn Monroe's unreleased film, Something's Got to Give (1962). The next memory is of the pair together in the same pool, however in happier times. During the song's bridge, the scenes alternate from Carey at her home in the present, to the duo holding each other intimately in a car. The video ends with Carey alone in the car, while wearing her lover's jacket.

=== Chart performance ===
"Don't Forget About Us" music video peaked at #1 on Billboard's Hot Videoclip Tracks chart.

== Remixes ==
The main remix of "Don't Forget About Us" was produced by Jermaine Dupri and is known as the Mr. Dupri mix. It features guest appearances from rappers Juelz Santana, Krayzie Bone and Layzie Bone. The Mr. Dupri mix was added to iTunes Music Store for download, while several dance remixes (by Ralphi Rosario & Craig J., Quentin Harris and Tony Moran & Warren Rigg) were produced and made available for sale at other download retailers. In January 2006, a new remix titled the Desert Storm remix, produced by DJ Clue (who also remixed "We Belong Together" and "Shake It Off") featuring Styles P and Fabolous, was released to U.S. radio. This remix appeared on DJ Clue's album Fidel Cashflow 2006. A video was also helmed for the Desert Storm mix and can be found on Clue's official MySpace page; it has shots of Carey, Styles P, DJ Clue and Fabolous in the studio and enjoying themselves. In 2025, a remix with Kaytranada was released for the 20th anniversary of The Emancipation of Mimi.

== Live performances ==
Carey performed "Don't Forget About Us" on several televised appearances, as well on all of her tours following its release. On November 15, 2005, the Chicago Tribune announced that Carey would perform during the half-time on the Thanksgiving game between the Detroit Lions and the Atlanta Falcons. Airing on the 24th, Carey performed "Shake It Off", as well as her newly released single from the album's re-release, "Don't Forget About Us". On November 22, 2005, Carey opened the 33rd annual American Music Awards with a performance of "Don't Forget About Us", held at the Shrine Auditorium in Los Angeles. Appearing on stage in a "sequined, silver, spaghetti-strap gown slit to the waist", Carey completed the song before accepting the first award of the evening. Dave West from Digital Spy described it as a "blistering performance", and claimed Carey "wowed" the crowd with her live rendition of the song. Two months later, she celebrated the new year on television, placing as the featured performer at the Times Square Ball drop on New Year's Eve in New York. The special, titled Dick Clark's New Year's Rockin' Eve with Ryan Seacrest, aired on ABC at 10 pm on December 31, and featured Carey on stage wearing a short sparkling dress, and performing a selection of the album's singles.

On Carey's 2006 The Adventures of Mimi Tour stop at Madison Square Garden, she sang "Don't Forget About Us" while wearing a sparkling bikini top and black leggings. She introduced the song as a "thank you" to fans for "making this my 17th number one single". Four years later during Carey's Angels Advocate Tour in 2010, she had not performed the song on the first few runs of the tour. At the show in Phoenix, she told the crowd that she had forgotten the song until that night: "I had forgotten about this song the whole tour and I don't know why. Funny I should forget it, considering the title." Dressed in a "form-fitting short dress with a flared, tutu-like bottom" for the first portion of the night, Carey completed the song as the fourth on the set-list.

== Formats and track listings ==
Digital download

1. "Don't Forget About Us" (Radio Edit) – 3:53

Digital download - remix

1. "Don't Forget About Us" (Remix feat. Juelz Santana & Bone Thugs-n-Harmony) – 3:32

Digital download - Quentin Shelter Anthem

1. "Don't Forget About Us" (Quentin Shelter Anthem Mix) – 12:29

Digital download - Ralphi Rosario and Craig Martini Vocal

1. "Don't Forget About Us" (Ralphi Rosario and Craig Martini Vocal) – 7:41

Digital download - Tony Moran & Warren Rigg Dance Floor Anthem

1. "Don't Forget About Us" (Tony Moran & Warren Rigg Dance Floor Anthem) – 9:32

Digital download - Ralphi and Jody DB Anthomic Dub

1. "Don't Forget About Us" (Ralphi and Jody DB Anthomic Dub) – 11:43

European CD single

1. "Don't Forget About Us" – 3:53
2. "Don't Forget About Us" (Remix feat. Juelz Santana & Bone Thugs-n-Harmony) – 3:33

European enhanced CD single

1. "Don't Forget About Us" – 3:53
2. "Don't Forget About Us" (Ralphi & Craig J. Anthomic Vocal Mix) – 9:50
3. "Don't Forget About Us" (Tony Moran Mix) – 4:18
4. "Don't Forget About Us" (Video)

UK CD single 1

1. "Don't Forget About Us" (Radio Edit) – 3:56
2. "Don't Forget About Us" (Ralphi Rosario & Craig J. Martini At XO Vocal Edit) – 3:40

UK CD single 2

1. "Don't Forget About Us" (Radio Edit) – 3:55
2. "Don't Forget About Us" (Dance Floor Anthem Mix) – 9:32
3. "Shake It Off" (Remix feat. JAY-Z & Young Jeezy) – 5:05

UK 12-inch vinyl

A1. "Don't Forget About Us" (Radio Edit) – 3:53
A2. "Don't Forget About Us" (Raphi Rosario & Craig J. Anthomic Vocal Edit) – 9:50
B. "Don't Forget About Us" (Quentin Harris Re-Production Shelter Anthem Mix) – 12:29

Australasian enhanced CD single

1. "Don't Forget About Us" (Album Version) – 3:53
2. "Don't Forget About Us" (Dance Floor Anthem) [Tony Moran & Warren Rigg] – 9:32
3. "Don't Forget About Us" (Ralphi & Craig Martini Vocal) – 7:41
4. "Don't Forget About Us" (Quentin Shelter Anthem Mix) – 12:29
5. "Don't Forget About Us" (Video)

US double 12-inch vinyl (The Emancipation Remixes)

A. "Don't Forget About Us" (Dance Floor Anthem) – 9:32
B. "Don't Forget About Us" (Ralphi And Craig Martini Vocal) – 7:41
C. "Don't Forget About Us" (Quentin Shelter Anthem Mix) – 12:29
D. "Don't Forget About Us" (Ralphi And Jody Anthomic Dub) – 11:43

Don't Forget About Us EP

1. "Don't Forget About Us" (Radio Edit) – 3:53
2. "Don't Forget About Us" (Desert Storm Remix feat. Fabolous & Styles P.) – 4:48
3. "Don't Forget About Us" (Remix feat. Juelz Santana & Bone Thugs-n-Harmony) – 3:32
4. "Don't Forget About Us" (Instrumental) – 3:38
5. "Don't Forget About Us" (Tony Moran & Warren Rigg Dance Floor Anthem) – 9:32
6. "Don't Forget About Us" (Tony Moran & Warren Rigg Radio Mix) – 4:16
7. "Don't Forget About Us" (Quentin Shelter Anthem Mix) – 12:30
8. "Don't Forget About Us" (Quentin Radio Mix) – 4:41
9. "Don't Forget About Us" (Ralphi Rosario & Craig J. Martini At XO Vocal Mix) – 7:42
10. "Don't Forget About Us" (Ralphi Rosario & Craig J. Martini At XO Vocal Edit) – 3:40
11. "Don't Forget About Us" (Ralphi Rosario & Craig J. Martini Anthomic Vocal Remix) – 9:51
12. "Don't Forget About Us" (Ralphi Rosario & Jody DB Anthomic Dub) – 11:43

== Credits and personnel ==
Credits are adapted from The Emancipation of Mimi liner notes.

- Mariah Carey – songwriter, producer, vocals
- Jermaine Dupri – songwriter, producer
- Bryan-Michael Cox – songwriter
- Johntá Austin – songwriter
- Brian Garten – recording

== Charts ==
Weekly chart performance for "Don't Forget About Us"
Chart (2005–2006)	Peak position
Australia (ARIA)	12
Australian Urban (ARIA)	3
Austria (Ö3 Austria Top 40)	61
Belgium (Ultratip Bubbling Under Flanders)	1
Belgium (Ultratip Bubbling Under Wallonia)	2
Canada CHR/Pop Top 30 (Radio & Records)	2
European Hot 100 Singles (Billboard)	38
Finland (Suomen virallinen lista)	1
Germany (GfK)	41
Global Dance Songs (Billboard)	8
Hungary (Single Top 40)	6
Ireland (IRMA)	25
Italy (FIMI)	11
Netherlands (Dutch Top 40)	32
Netherlands (Single Top 100)	27
New Zealand (Recorded Music NZ)	12
Romania (Romanian Top 100)	95
Scottish Singles Sales (Official Charts)	20
Switzerland (Schweizer Hitparade)	19
UK Singles (Official Charts)	11
UK Hip Hop/R&B (Official Charts)	2
UK Club (Music Week) Mixes	4
UK Pop Club (Music Week) Mixes	5
UK Urban Club (Music Week)	14
US Billboard Hot 100	1
US Dance Club Songs (Billboard)	1
US Dance Airplay (Billboard)	1
US Dance Singles Sales (Billboard)	20
US Hot R&B/Hip-Hop Songs (Billboard)	1
US Pop Airplay (Billboard)	3
US Pop 100 (Billboard)	2
US Rhythmic Airplay (Billboard)	2
US CHR/Pop (Radio & Records)	3
US CHR/Rhythmic (Radio & Records)	1
US Urban (Radio & Records)	1
US Urban AC (Radio & Records)	12

2005 year-end chart performance for "Don't Forget About Us"
Chart (2005)	Position
US Rhythmic Airplay (Billboard)	96
US Urban (Radio & Records)	126

2006 year-end chart performance for "Don't Forget About Us"
Chart (2006)	Position
Australia (ARIA)	89
Australian Urban (ARIA)	24
Brazil (Crowley)	11
US Billboard Hot 100	50
US Dance Club Play (Billboard)	3
US Hot Dance Airplay (Billboard)	20
US Hot R&B/Hip-Hop Songs (Billboard)	21
US Mainstream Top 40 (Billboard)	30
US Pop 100 (Billboard)	44
US Rhythmic Airplay (Billboard)	23

Decade-end chart performance for "Don't Forget About Us"
Chart (2000–2009)	Position
US Dance Club Play (Billboard)	10

== Certifications and sales ==
Certifications and sales for "Don't Forget About Us"
Region	Certification	Certified units/sales
United States (RIAA)	Platinum	1,000,000^{*}
United States (RIAA) Mastertone	Gold	500,000^{*}
^{*} Sales figures based on certification alone.

== Release history ==
Release dates and formats for "Don't Forget About Us"
Region	Date	Format(s)	Label(s)	Ref.
United Kingdom	December 12, 2005	CD	Def Jam	

== See also ==
- List of Billboard Hot 100 number-one singles of 2005 and 2006 (U.S.)
- List of number-one R&B singles of 2005 (U.S.)
- List of number-one dance singles of 2006 (U.S.)
- List of number-one dance airplay hits of 2006 (U.S.)
