= List of Billboard Hot 100 number ones of 2005 =

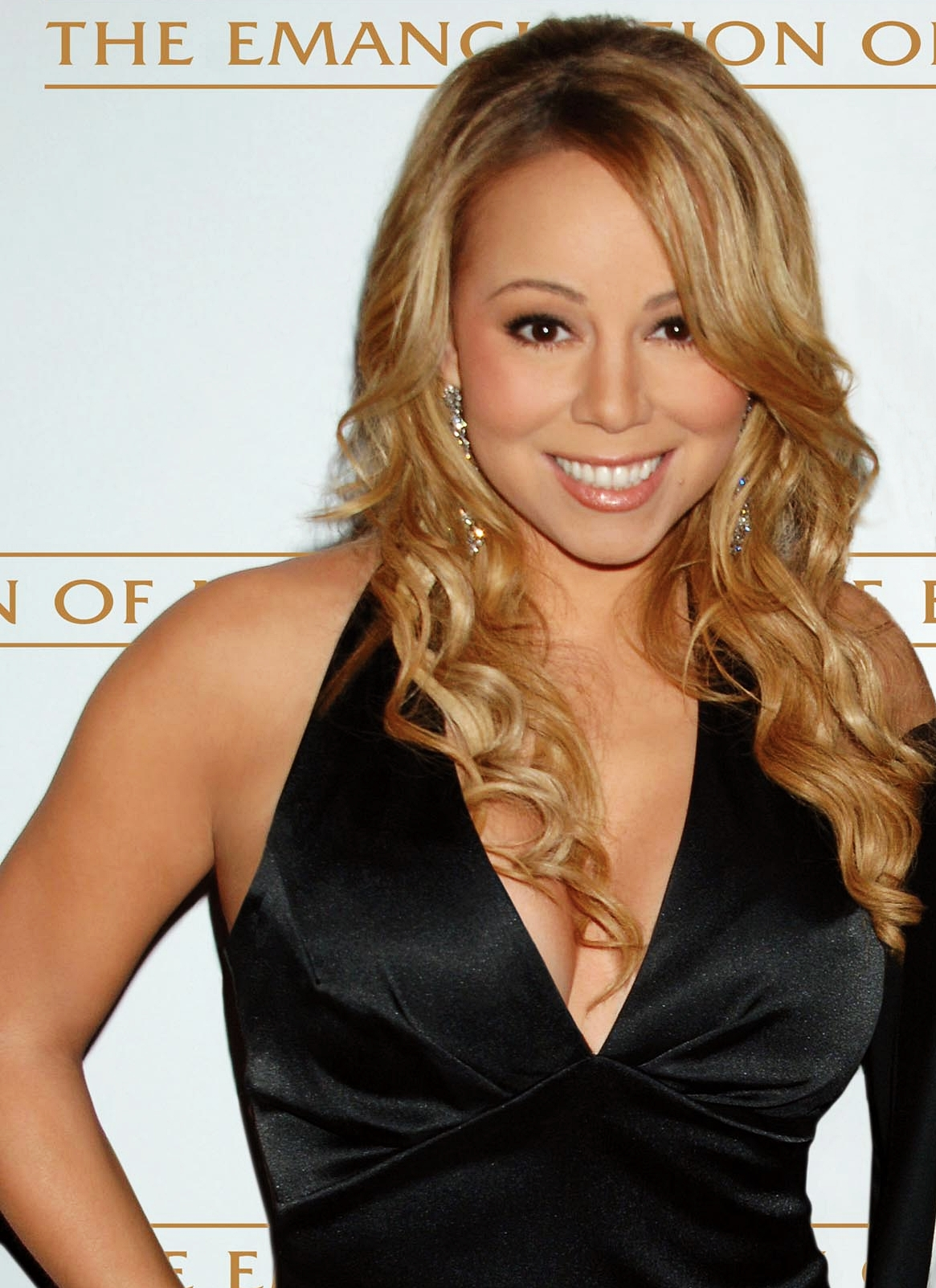
Mariah Carey spent fifteen weeks atop the Hot 100 in 2005, with fourteen of them being "We Belong Together", which became the second longest running number one single on the chart, following Carey's "One Sweet Day".

The Billboard Hot 100 is a chart that ranks the best-performing singles of the United States. Published by Billboard magazine, the data are compiled by Nielsen SoundScan based collectively on each single's weekly physical and digital sales, and airplay. In 2005, there were eight singles that topped the chart in fifty-three issues of the magazine, the second lowest of any year.

During the year, five acts achieved their first US number-one single, either as a lead artist or featured guest: Mario, Olivia, Gwen Stefani, Carrie Underwood, and Chris Brown. Stefani earned her first number-one single in the United States this year, although she had been with band the No Doubt since 1986. Hip hop artist Kanye West gained his first number-one single, "Gold Digger", as lead artist; West previously had a number-one single with "Slow Jamz", a 2004 song by rapper Twista. Two acts, Underwood and Brown, scored a number-one debut single this year. Mariah Carey was the only act to have more than one number one song, with her earning two.

Mariah Carey's "We Belong Together" is the longest-running single of 2005, topping the Billboard Hot 100 for 14 non-consecutive weeks. The single is tied with "I Gotta Feeling" by American group The Black Eyed Peas for the longest-running number-one single of the decade. As of 2018, "We Belong Together" was tied for the second longest-running number-one single in the entire Hot 100 era behind Boyz II Men's and Carey's 1995 single "One Sweet Day", which spent sixteen weeks at number one. Despite being surpassed by three other songs during the years, "We Belong Together" still is one of the songs with the most weeks spent at number one in the entire Hot 100 history. West's "Gold Digger" is the second longest-running, having peaked the chart for 10 consecutive weeks. Other singles with extended chart runs include R&B singer Mario's "Let Me Love You", his best-performing song to date, and rapper 50 Cent's "Candy Shop", each spent nine straight weeks at number one.

Carey is the only artist to have earned two number-one singles in 2005 after "Don't Forget About Us" topped the chart in the final calendar issue of Billboard Hot 100. "Don't Forget About Us" is Carey's 17th number-one single, placing her third in the list of acts with most number ones in the United States at the time, behind only The Beatles and Elvis Presley. "We Belong Together" is the best-performing single of the chart year, topping the Top Hot 100 Hits of 2005; this gave Carey her first number-one single in the year-end chart.

== Chart history ==
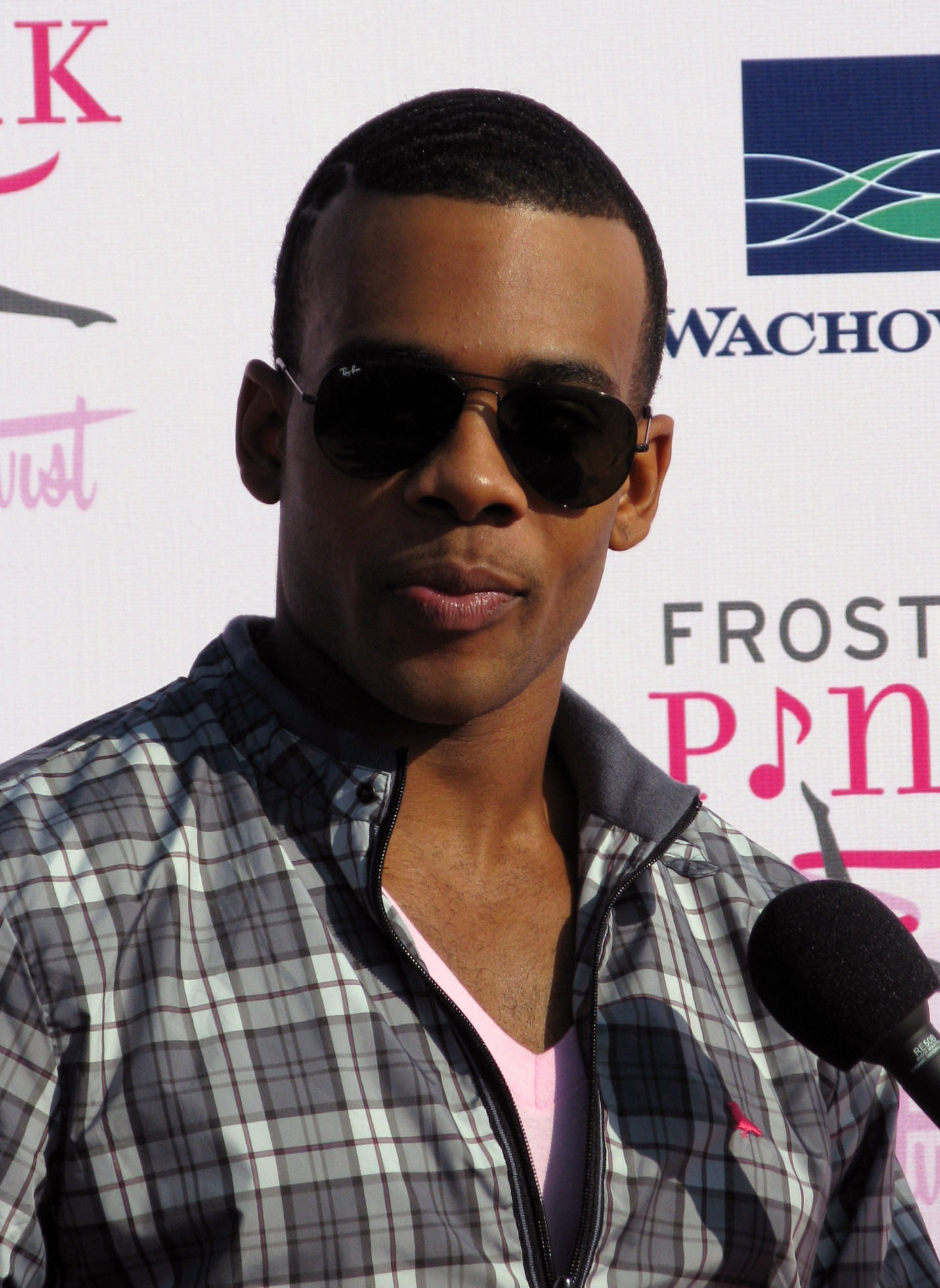
R&B singer Mario scored his first number-one single with "Let Me Love You", which spent at the top spot for nine consecutive weeks, becoming his best-performing single as of 2005.

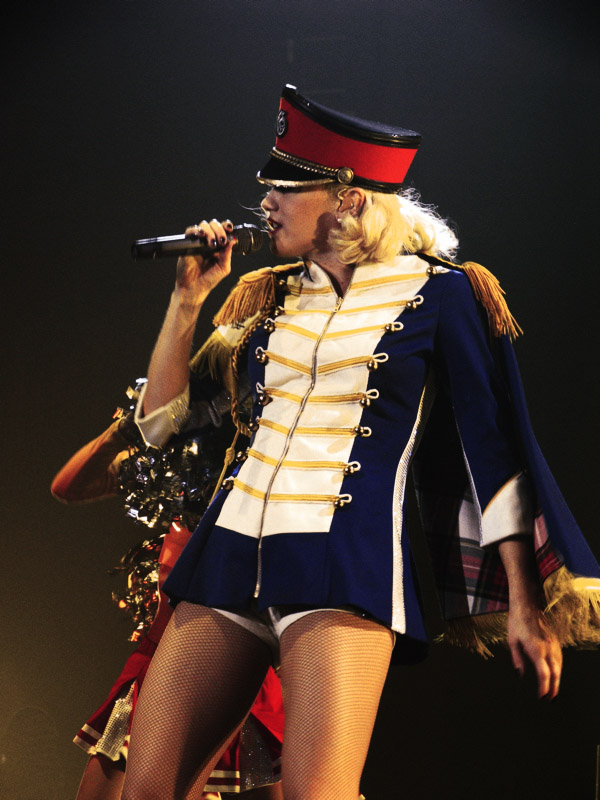
Singer Gwen Stefani earned her first number one single "Hollaback Girl" in U.S.

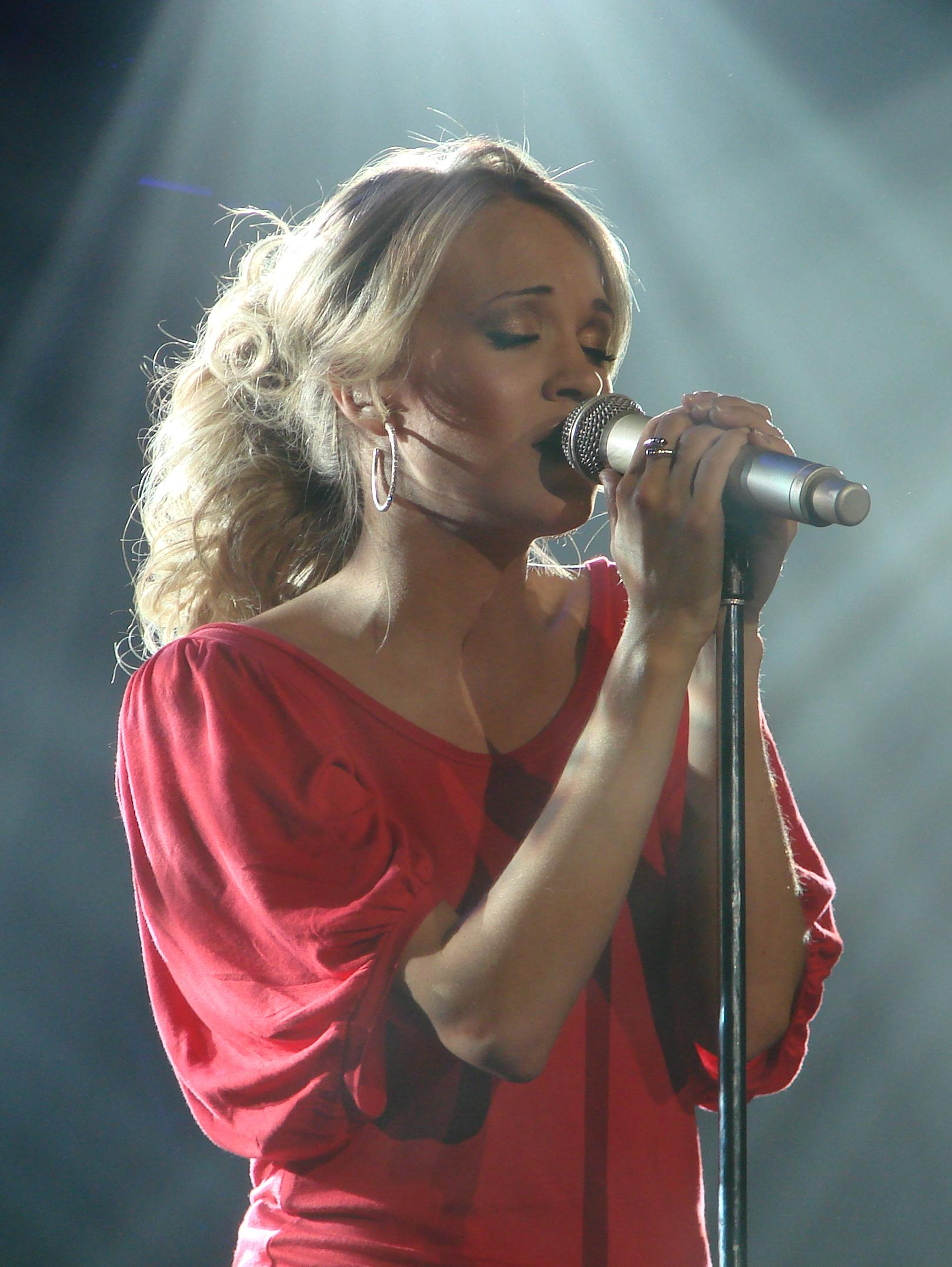
Country singer Carrie Underwood earned her first number one single "Inside Your Heaven" in U.S., and stayed at the top for one week.

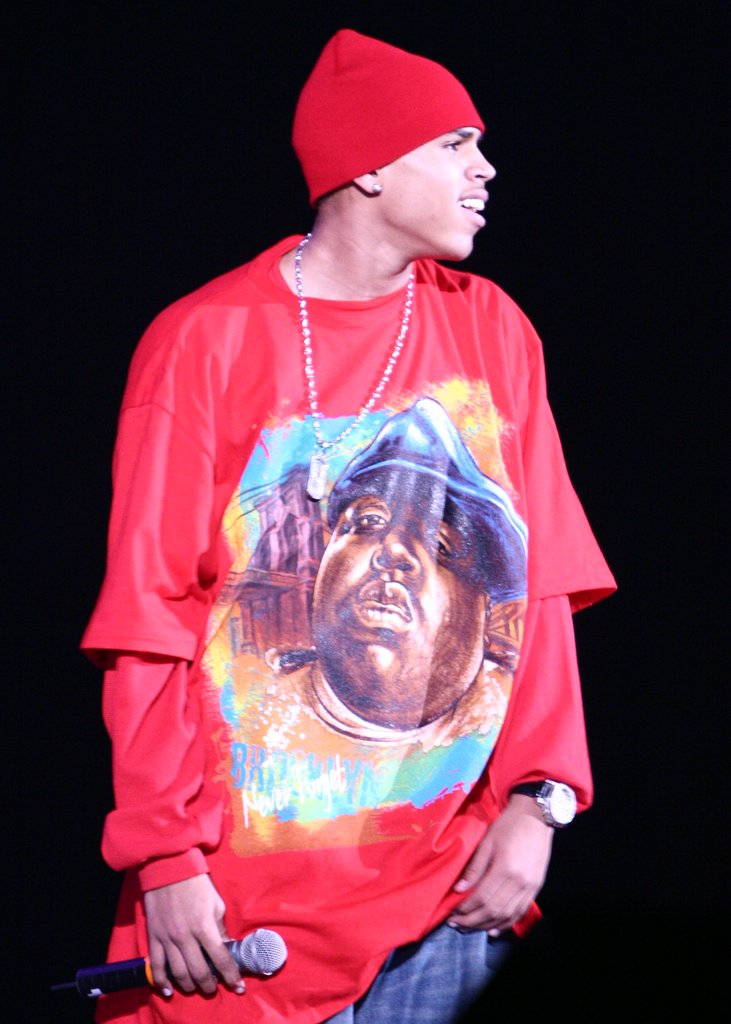
Singer Chris Brown earned his first number one single "Run It!" in U.S., and stayed at the top for five consecutive weeks.

Key
†	Indicates best-performing single of 2005

No.	Issue date	Song	Artist(s)	Reference(s)
911	January 1	"Let Me Love You"	Mario	
911	January 8	"Let Me Love You"	Mario	
911	January 15	"Let Me Love You"	Mario	
911	January 22	"Let Me Love You"	Mario	
911	January 29	"Let Me Love You"	Mario	
911	February 5	"Let Me Love You"	Mario	
911	February 12	"Let Me Love You"	Mario	
911	February 19	"Let Me Love You"	Mario	
911	February 26	"Let Me Love You"	Mario	
912	March 5	"Candy Shop"	50 Cent featuring Olivia	
912	March 12	"Candy Shop"	50 Cent featuring Olivia	
912	March 19	"Candy Shop"	50 Cent featuring Olivia	
912	March 26	"Candy Shop"	50 Cent featuring Olivia	
912	April 2	"Candy Shop"	50 Cent featuring Olivia	
912	April 9	"Candy Shop"	50 Cent featuring Olivia	
912	April 16	"Candy Shop"	50 Cent featuring Olivia	
912	April 23	"Candy Shop"	50 Cent featuring Olivia	
912	April 30	"Candy Shop"	50 Cent featuring Olivia	
913	May 7	"Hollaback Girl"	Gwen Stefani	
913	May 14	"Hollaback Girl"	Gwen Stefani	
913	May 21	"Hollaback Girl"	Gwen Stefani	
913	May 28	"Hollaback Girl"	Gwen Stefani	
914	June 4	"We Belong Together"†	Mariah Carey	
914	June 11	"We Belong Together"†	Mariah Carey	
914	June 18	"We Belong Together"†	Mariah Carey	
914	June 25	"We Belong Together"†	Mariah Carey	
915	July 2	"Inside Your Heaven"	Carrie Underwood	
re	July 9	"We Belong Together"†	Mariah Carey	
re	July 16	"We Belong Together"†	Mariah Carey	
re	July 23	"We Belong Together"†	Mariah Carey	
re	July 30	"We Belong Together"†	Mariah Carey	
re	August 6	"We Belong Together"†	Mariah Carey	
re	August 13	"We Belong Together"†	Mariah Carey	
re	August 20	"We Belong Together"†	Mariah Carey	
re	August 27	"We Belong Together"†	Mariah Carey	
re	September 3	"We Belong Together"†	Mariah Carey	
re	September 10	"We Belong Together"†	Mariah Carey	
916	September 17	"Gold Digger"	Kanye West featuring Jamie Foxx	
916	September 24	"Gold Digger"	Kanye West featuring Jamie Foxx	
916	October 1	"Gold Digger"	Kanye West featuring Jamie Foxx	
916	October 8	"Gold Digger"	Kanye West featuring Jamie Foxx	
916	October 15	"Gold Digger"	Kanye West featuring Jamie Foxx	
916	October 22	"Gold Digger"	Kanye West featuring Jamie Foxx	
916	October 29	"Gold Digger"	Kanye West featuring Jamie Foxx	
916	November 5	"Gold Digger"	Kanye West featuring Jamie Foxx	
916	November 12	"Gold Digger"	Kanye West featuring Jamie Foxx	
916	November 19	"Gold Digger"	Kanye West featuring Jamie Foxx	
917	November 26	"Run It!"	Chris Brown	
917	December 3	"Run It!"	Chris Brown	
917	December 10	"Run It!"	Chris Brown	
917	December 17	"Run It!"	Chris Brown	
917	December 24	"Run It!"	Chris Brown	
918	December 31	"Don't Forget About Us"	Mariah Carey	

== Number-one artists ==
List of number-one artists by total weeks at number one
Position	Artist	Weeks at No. 1
1	Mariah Carey	15
2	Kanye West	10
2	Jamie Foxx	10
4	Mario	9
4	50 Cent	9
4	Olivia	9
7	Chris Brown	5
8	Gwen Stefani	4
9	Carrie Underwood	1

== See also ==
- 2005 in music
- List of Billboard number-one singles
- Billboard Year-End Hot 100 singles of 2005
- List of Billboard Hot 100 number-one singles of the 2000s

== Additional sources ==
- Fred Bronson's Billboard Book of Number 1 Hits, 5th Edition (ISBN 0-8230-7677-6)
- Joel Whitburn's Top Pop Singles 1955-2008, 12 Edition (ISBN 0-89820-180-2)
- Joel Whitburn Presents the Billboard Hot 100 Charts: The 2000s (ISBN 0-89820-182-9)
- Additional information obtained can be verified within Billboard's online archive services and print editions of the magazine.
