= Hollaback Girl =

2005 single by Gwen Stefani

Single by Gwen Stefani

from the album Love. Angel. Music. Baby.
- Released: March 22, 2005
- Recorded: Early 2004
- Studio: Right Track (New York City)
- Genre: Pop; hip-hop; post-R&B
- Length: 3:19
- Label: Interscope
- Songwriters: Gwen Stefani; Pharrell Williams; Chad Hugo
- Producer: The Neptunes

Gwen Stefani singles chronology
"Rich Girl" (2004)	"Hollaback Girl" (2005)	"Cool" (2005)

Music video
- "Hollaback Girl" on YouTube

"Hollaback Girl" is a song by American singer Gwen Stefani from her debut solo studio album, Love. Angel. Music. Baby. (2004). It is a pop, hip-hop and post-R&B song that draws influence from 1980s hip-hop and dance music. The song was written by Stefani, Pharrell Williams, and Chad Hugo, with the latter two handling production as the Neptunes. The song was released as the album's third single on March 22, 2005, and was one of the year's most popular songs, peaking inside the top 10 of the majority of the charts it entered. It reached number one in Australia and the United States, where it became the first digital download to sell one million copies.

"Hollaback Girl" received several award nominations, including Best Female Pop Vocal Performance and Record of the Year at the 48th Grammy Awards. The song divided pop music critics, with some praising its minimalistic production and others declaring it embarrassing. The men's magazine Maxim named it as the "Most Annoying Song Ever". In the United States, the song topped the Billboard Hot 100 for four weeks and was ranked at number two on the Year-End Hot 100 chart. The single topped the charts in Australia and reached the top-ten in several other countries, including Ireland, Italy, New Zealand, and the United Kingdom. It has since been certified six-times Platinum in United States by the RIAA, and in Australia by the ARIA.

A music video with Stefani as a cheerleader at a California high school was released on March 21, 2005, and was directed by Paul Hunter. The video received four nominations at the 2005 MTV Video Music Awards, and ultimately won for Best Choreography. Stefani has performed "Hollaback Girl" on numerous occasions, including on all three of her concert tours, and on several televised appearances.

== Writing and inspiration ==
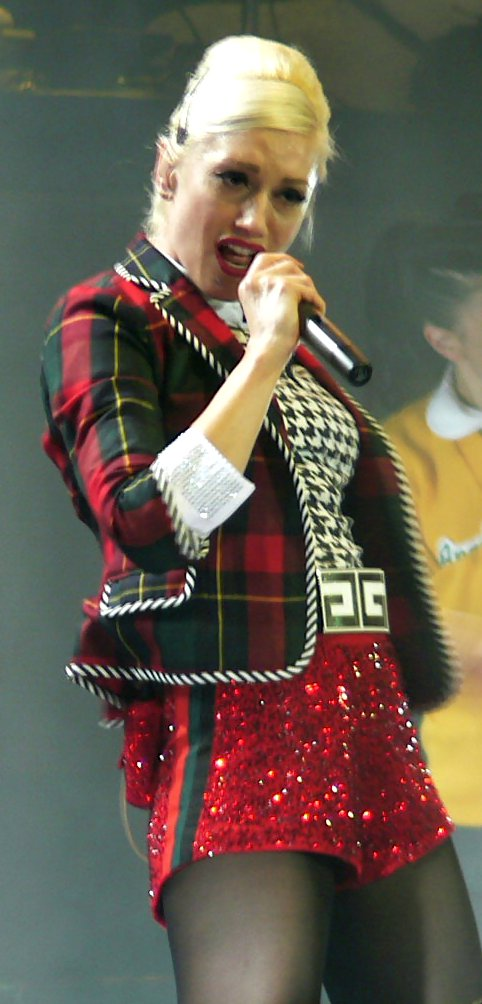
Stefani performing "Hollaback Girl" in 2007 at The Sweet Escape Tour

As part of Gwen Stefani's vision of creating "a silly dance record", she had worked with the Neptunes (Pharrell and Chad Hugo) during the early stages of writing songs for her debut solo album Love. Angel. Music. Baby.. However, a case of writer's block resulted in reportedly uninspired collaborations. As the album neared completion, Stefani regained her confidence and booked another session with the Neptunes. Stefani flew to New York City to meet up with Pharrell, and after finishing two songs within a week, Stefani ended the session early and prepared to return home. A few minutes later, Pharrell called her back into the studio to write another song. Stefani said, "I was tired. I wanted to go home, but he was like, 'Don't leave yet.'" When she returned to the studio, Pharrell began to play Stefani his first solo album, the then-unreleased In My Mind, and she became envious. Excited by his material, she decided to write another song with Pharrell, despite her opinion that the album already contained far too many tracks.

To search for inspiration, Stefani and Pharrell had a lengthy discussion in which Stefani said that she had yet to write a song about her intentions for pursuing a solo career. She remarked how the album was missing an "attitude song", and she recalled a derogatory comment that grunge musician Courtney Love had made about her in an interview with Seventeen magazine: "Being famous is just like being in high school. But I'm not interested in being the cheerleader. I'm not interested in being Gwen Stefani. She's the cheerleader, and I'm out in the smoker shed." Stefani discussed the song's inspiration in the March 2005 issue of NME: "Y'know someone one time called me a cheerleader, negatively, and I've never been a cheerleader. So I was, like, 'OK, fuck you. You want me to be a cheerleader? Well, I will be one then. And I'll rule the whole world, just you watch me.'" The song uses a lyrical and a melodic interpolation of "Another One Bites the Dust" by Queen, referencing the common usage of the song at sporting events, aimed at losing opponents, with Stefani's antagonistic stance likely aimed at Love.

Stefani believed that some No Doubt fans would be upset with her solo effort, commenting, "[They] were probably like, 'Why is she doing this record? She's going to ruin everything'." She revealed that she too did not know why she was recording a solo album. For the remainder of the evening, Stefani and Pharrell incorporated this inspiration into the lyrics that eventually became "Hollaback Girl". The two decided that Stefani did not have to have an answer for her intentions and that the choices she made were based on what she felt was wrong or right. On its creation, Stefani said, "To me, it is the freshest attitude song I've heard in so long." Pharrell was pleased with the song, commenting, "Gwen is like the girl in high school who just had her own style."

Because Stefani never disclosed the song title's meaning, reviewers came up with various interpretations. In a satirical, line-by-line analysis of the song's lyrics, OC Weekly critic Greg Stacy humorously speculated that "Gwen is apparently the captain of the cheerleader squad; she is the girl who 'hollas' the chants, not one of the girls who simply 'hollas' them back". The most commonly accepted meaning is that a "hollaback girl" responds positively to the "catcalls" or hollers of men, but it might mean to Stefani that she would rather take the initiative and "step it up". In March 2021, it was revealed that a comment made by British supermodel Naomi Campbell served as inspiration for the chorus. In an appearance on Campbell's YouTube talk show No Filter, Pharrell stated that she had responded to someone saying, "I'm sorry, I have a name. I ain't no Holla Back girl", the latter phrase apparently referencing the Fabolous song "Young'n (Holla Back)"; Pharrell was inspired by the overheard conversation and incorporated the lyric into the chorus of "Hollaback Girl".

== Composition and musical style ==
"Hollaback Girl"
Stefani sings in a chant during the chorus for "Hollaback Girl"

"Hollaback Girl" is a pop, hip-hop and post-R&B song, that draws influence from 1980s hip-hop and dance music. A moderately fast song, with a tempo of 110 beats per minute, it is played in the key of D♯ minor. Like the majority of pop music, it is set in common time. The main chord pattern of the song alternates between B major and D♯ minor triads. Most of the harmonic content of the song revolves around a two-chord alternation which music theorists may regard as an L (leading tone) transformation, in which the root of the major chord is lowered by a half-step to form a second inversion minor chord on the third scale degree, a slight tonicization of B major, but resolving back to D♯ minor by having the same A♯, a perfect fourth down from D♯. This stepwise motion between B and A♯ highlights this chord change.

The song is in verse-chorus form with a bridge before the fourth and last chorus. The song features sparse instrumentation, primarily a minimal beat produced by drum machine. A guitar plays the song's riff, a six-note pattern as Stefani repeats "this my shit" during the chorus, and a brass section joins during the second chorus. In part because of its cheerleading motif, it drew comparisons to Toni Basil's 1982 song "Mickey".

== Critical reception ==
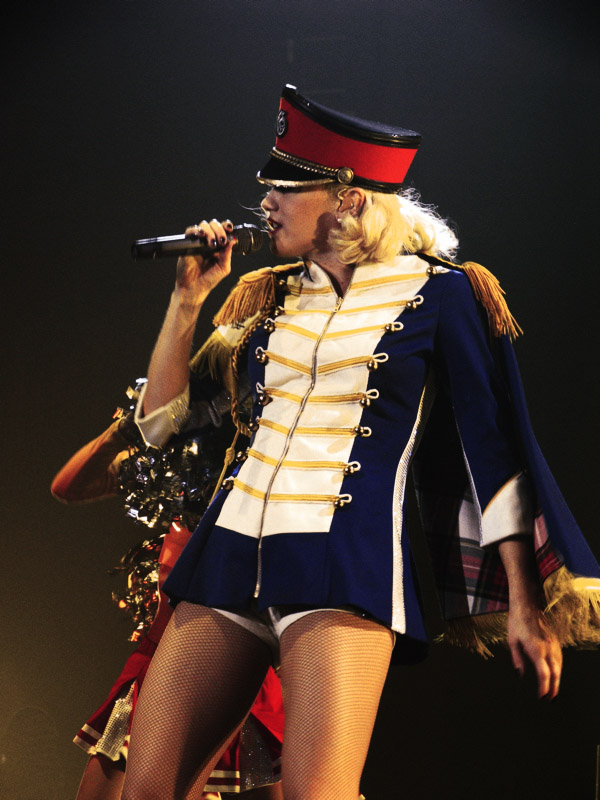
Stefani performing "Hollaback Girl" on the Harajuku Lovers Tour

"Hollaback Girl" received mixed reviews from music critics. Yahoo! Music's Jennifer Nine described it as a "stomping, stripped-back" track, and Stephen Thomas Erlewine of AllMusic noted that it had the "thumping, minimal beats" of the Neptunes. Richard Smirke of Playlouder called it "a trademark Neptunes hip-hop stomp." In his review of Love. Angel. Music. Baby., Rob Sheffield of Rolling Stone gave the song a positive review, writing that "Stefani's gum-snapping sass brings out the beast in her beatmasters, especially the Neptunes in 'Hollaback Girl'." Blender listed it as the 11th best song of 2005, and the song tied with Damian Marley's "Welcome to Jamrock" for number five on the 2005 Village Voice Pazz & Jop, a survey of several hundred music critics conducted by Robert Christgau.

On the other hand, Jason Damas, in a review for PopMatters, felt that the song sounds "almost exactly like Dizzee Rascal", and added, "Lyrically, this is where Gwen sinks the lowest here, especially on a breakdown where she repeats, 'This shit is bananas / B-A-N-A-N-A-S!' several times". Eric Greenwood of Drawer B called the song "moronic and embarrassingly tuneless," while also writing "I'd quote the lyrics, but they're so bad, I almost feel sorry for her. A 35-year-old woman singing about pom-poms and 'talking shit' in high school betrays such a delusional self-image that it's hard not to be taken aback. And on top of that, the Neptunes' beats are clunky and the production is senselessly bombastic." Nick Sylvester of Pitchfork also criticized the track, referring to it as a "Queen pastiche [...] which has about as much club potential as a 13-year old with a milk moustache and his dad's ID". However, despite this initial negative review, Pitchfork would later place the track at number 35 on its list of the Top 50 Singles of 2005, and at number 180 on its list of the Top 500 Tracks of the 2000s. Maxim was unimpressed with the song, and in its October 2005 issue, published a list of the "20 Most Annoying Songs Ever" with "Hollaback Girl" in first place. Cat Conway of Drowned in Sound gave the song a negative review, saying "'Hollaback Girl' sees Gwen Stefani getting a big lick off the Neptunes flavour at the Hot Producer Baskin-Robbins [sic], delivering vocals that sound like she needs a Sudafed."

== Commercial performance ==
"Hollaback Girl" entered the Billboard Hot 100 at number 82 on the issue dated April 2, 2005, and within six weeks of its release, it had reached the top of the chart, becoming Stefani's first and only US number one. It ended the nine-week run of 50 Cent's "Candy Shop" featuring Olivia, and maintained the number-one position for four consecutive weeks. "Hollaback Girl" ranked second on the 2005 Hot 100 year-end chart. The song held the record for most US radio airplays in one week, with 9,582 plays, and maintained this record for over a year before Shakira and Wyclef Jean's "Hips Don't Lie" overtook the position. "Hollaback Girl" peaked at number one on the Billboard Pop 100 chart for eight weeks and at number 15 on the Hot Dance Club Play chart. The song was a crossover success and reached number four on the Rhythmic Top 40 and number eight on the Hot R&B/Hip-Hop Songs chart.

"Hollaback Girl" was noted for having a large number of digital downloads, becoming the first single to sell more digital downloads than CDs. In October 2005, "Hollaback Girl" was the first single to ever sell one million digital downloads and later went on to sell a total of 1.2 million downloads. It was certified six-times platinum by the Recording Industry Association of America. It was later re-certified platinum, for the same sales, due to the change of the RIAA certification criteria for singles. (Note: The number of sales required to qualify for gold and platinum discs was lower for digital singles prior to August 2006. The thresholds were 100,000 units (gold) and 200,000 units (platinum), reflecting an increase in digital downloads.) On the year-end list for Hot Digital Songs in 2005, "Hollaback Girl" topped the chart.

"Hollaback Girl" was successful in Canada, where the song debuted and peaked at number 12 on the Canadian Singles Chart. However, Graham Henderson, president of the Canadian Recording Industry Association (CRIA), later argued that based on Canada's population relative to the US, the single should have sold around 120,000 copies and that the comparatively lower sales of 25,000 were a sign that the Canadian copyright law should be tightened to discourage non-commercial peer-to-peer file sharing. Columnist Michael Geist disputed the comparison, arguing that the Canadian online music market was still developing. The song was released in Australia on May 23, 2005, debuting at number one on the ARIA Singles Chart, and in Europe on June 6, 2005, reaching number five on the European Hot 100 Singles. In the United Kingdom, "Hollaback Girl" was released on the same day, but it did not perform as well as Stefani's previous releases. The song's predecessors, "What You Waiting For?" and "Rich Girl" featuring Eve, had both reached number four, while "Hollaback Girl" debuted at number eight and remained at the same position the following week. Although its UK success was limited, it remained in the top 40 for an additional 11 weeks. The single was largely successful across Europe, reaching the top five in Austria, Denmark, Germany, and Ireland, and the top 10 in Belgium, Finland, Italy, the Netherlands, Norway, Sweden, and Switzerland.

== Music video ==
Stefani on a Chevrolet Impala with the album cover art

The music video for "Hollaback Girl" was directed by Paul Hunter and filmed in the Van Nuys and Reseda neighborhoods of Los Angeles, California. The video opens with a scene of Stefani taking a picture of her four Harajuku Girls, when a crowd of students appears. Stefani and the Harajuku Girls then drive down Sherman Way past Magnolia Science Academy to Birmingham High School in a 1961 Chevrolet Impala, followed by the crowd. Stefani and the group inflict a commotion when they disrupt a football game by walking onto the field and when they go to a 99 Cents Only Store and throw cereal and other food products down an aisle. Throughout the video, there are intercut sequences of choreographed dancing filmed in a sound stage, intended to represent Stefani's imagination. Stefani and the Harajuku Girls are outfitted in cheerleading uniforms, accompanied by several Californian spirit groups: the Orange Crush All Stars, a cheerleading squad from Orange County; a marching band from Fountain Valley High School in Fountain Valley; a pep flag team named the Flaggies from Carson High School in Carson; and a drill team from Stephen M. White Middle School in Carson. To visualize the song's bridge, the Harajuku Girls spell the word "bananas" with cue cards. The video ends with the cheerleaders and dancers leaving with a close-up frame of Stefani with her arms raised.

The Chevy Impala convertible from the video includes a painting by artist J. Martin. The design includes Stefani as seen on the album cover of Love. Angel. Music. Baby. with the words "Hollaback Girl" in calligraphy. The car was, eventually, sold on eBay. Pharrell, one of the song's co-producers, makes a cameo appearance. The complete version of "Hollaback Girl" featured in the music video was released commercially through CD singles and digital downloads. Some include remixes by Diplo and former No Doubt bandmate Tony Kanal.

The video debuted on the day before the single, and proved successful on video chart programs. It debuted on MTV's Total Request Live on March 31 at number 10 and remained on the program for a total of 50 days, becoming what Rolling Stone called "a staple of MTV's TRL". The video reached the top of the chart and was retired at number four on June 23, becoming Stefani's first video to retire. VH1 listed the video at number five on its Top 40 Videos of 2005, and at the 2005 MTV Video Music Awards, the video received four nominations, but only won the award for Best Choreography. Stefani did not attend the 2006 MTV Video Music Awards, prompting rumors that she was protesting her lack of nominations the previous year, her multiple losses to Kelly Clarkson, and her not having been asked to perform. Stefani denied the rumors, responding, "the only reason I am not attending the MTV Video Music Awards is because I will be recording and spending time with my family."

== Live performances ==
Stefani has performed "Hollaback Girl" on several occasions, including on two of her concert tours, in addition to several appearances on TV shows. During the majority of the 2005 Harajuku Lovers Tour, Stefani sang the single as an encore performance, where she wore a drumming costume and encouraged the audience to sing along with her. However, in earlier shows, before the single's success, she sang it before tracks "Serious" and "Bubble Pop Electric". During The Sweet Escape Tour, she performed the song in the middle of the show wearing sparkly red shorts and an argyle jacket atop a L.A.M.B. black and white shirt. She also sported a belt buckle featuring the "G" motif frequently used in her subsequent album The Sweet Escape.

When Stefani agreed to be a judge on season 7 of the NBC music competition The Voice, she sang the track in May 2014 alongside Pharrell, who would also be appearing on the show as a judge. For the rendition, Stefani wore a black jumpsuit in contrast to Pharrell, who wore a Mickey Mouse-sweater and jeans. The performance prompted the song to enter the Billboard Pop Digital Songs component chart, where it re-entered at number thirty-four. On the May 4, 2016, episode of The Late Late Show with James Corden, Stefani sang a snippet of the song alongside James Corden in his show's segment "Carpool Karaoke". In addition to Stefani and Corden, actor George Clooney and actress Julia Roberts sang along; when the song concluded, Clooney stated "this [bleep]'s bananas". More recently, the single was included on her 2016 concert series This Is What the Truth Feels Like Tour. On November 27, 2019, Stefani performed "Hollaback Girl", alongside "What You Waitin’ For" and "Rich Girl", in a medley on The Voice in season 17 to commemorate Love. Angel. Music. Baby.'s 15th anniversary.

== Remixes and cover versions ==
Diplo made a remix for the track after M.I.A. turned down an offer to produce one. Tony Kanal, fellow No Doubt member, also produced a remix titled the Dancehollaback Remix. The track features reggae singer Elan Atias, whose debut album Kanal produced. It appears as a single on iTunes, on the CD single for "Cool", and on the bonus CD of the deluxe edition of Love. Angel. Music. Baby. Stefani later requested to contribute vocals on "I Wanna Yell" from Atias's debut album Together as One, and was featured on his song "Allnighter".

"Weird Al" Yankovic reportedly had plans to record a parody of the song for his new album Straight Outta Lynwood in 2006, called "Holodeck Girl", but it never came to fruition. Later that year, Gabe Saporta of Cobra Starship recorded a parody of the song titled "Hollaback Boy". Stefani also performed a "countrified version" of "Hollaback Girl" part of a skit on The Tonight Show Starring Jimmy Fallon where Jimmy Fallon portrayed the character Buck Pinto promoting a fictitious album Gwen's Gone Country.

== Track listings ==
- European two-track CD single
1. "Hollaback Girl" (Album Version) – 3:19
2. "Hollaback Girl" (Hollatronix Remix by Diplo) – 2:44
- Australian and European CD maxi single
1. "Hollaback Girl" (Album Version) – 3:19
2. "Hollaback Girl" (Hollatronix Remix by Diplo) – 2:44
3. "Hollaback Girl" (Instrumental) – 3:19
4. "Hollaback Girl" (Video) – 3:28
- US 12-inch single

A1. "Hollaback Girl" (Dancehollaback Remix featuring Elan) – 6:53
A2. "Hollaback Girl" (Dancehollaback Remix Clean featuring Elan) – 6:52
A3. "Hollaback Girl" (Dancehollaback Remix Radio featuring Elan) – 4:02
B1. "Hollaback Girl" (Hollatronic Remix) – 2:44
B2. "Hollaback Girl" (Dancehollaback Remix Instrumental) – 6:50
B3. "Hollaback Girl" (Dancehollaback Remix A Capppella) – 6:19

== Personnel ==
Personnel are adapted from the liner notes of Love. Angel. Music. Baby.

- Gwen Stefani – lead vocals, songwriting
- Andrew Coleman – recording
- Jason Finkel – assistant engineering
- Brian "Big Bass" Gardner – mastering
- Chad Hugo – songwriting
- The Neptunes – production
- Phil Tan – mixing
- Pharrell Williams – songwriting

== Charts ==
=== Weekly charts ===
Weekly chart performance for "Hollaback Girl"
Chart (2005)	Peak position
Australia (ARIA)	1
Austria (Ö3 Austria Top 40)	5
Belgium (Ultratop 50 Flanders)	6
Belgium (Ultratop 50 Wallonia)	16
Canada CHR/Pop Top 30 (Radio & Records)	1
Canada Hot AC Top 30 (Radio & Records)	22
Czech Republic Airplay (ČNS IFPI)	36
Denmark (Tracklisten)	5
Europe (European Hot 100 Singles)	5
Finland (Suomen virallinen lista)	8
France (SNEP)	17
Germany (GfK)	3
Greece (IFPI Greece)	13
Hungary (Rádiós Top 40)	23
Hungary (Dance Top 40)	11
Ireland (IRMA)	4
Italy (FIMI)	6
Netherlands (Dutch Top 40)	8
Netherlands (Single Top 100)	7
New Zealand (Recorded Music NZ)	3
Norway (VG-lista)	6
Romania (Romanian Top 100)	22
Scottish Singles Sales (Official Charts)	9
Sweden (Sverigetopplistan)	7
Switzerland (Schweizer Hitparade)	6
UK Singles (Official Charts)	8
UK Hip Hop/R&B (Official Charts)	4
US Billboard Hot 100	1
US Adult Pop Airplay (Billboard)	18
US Dance Airplay (Billboard)	3
US Dance Club Songs (Billboard)	15
US Hot R&B/Hip-Hop Songs (Billboard)	8
US Pop Airplay (Billboard)	1
US Pop 100 (Billboard)	1
US Rhythmic Airplay (Billboard)	4

=== Year-end charts ===
Year-end chart performance for "Hollaback Girl"
Chart (2005)	Position
Australia (ARIA)	21
Austria (Ö3 Austria Top 40)	39
Belgium (Ultratop 50 Flanders)	44
Belgium (Ultratop 50 Wallonia)	67
Brazil (Crowley)	45
Europe (European Hot 100 Singles)	44
Germany (Media Control GfK)	41
Netherlands (Dutch Top 40)	54
Netherlands (Single Top 100)	64
New Zealand (RIANZ)	19
Romania (Romanian Top 100)	52
Sweden (Hitlistan)	29
Switzerland (Schweizer Hitparade)	34
UK Singles (OCC)	47
US Billboard Hot 100	2
US Adult Top 40 (Billboard)	45
US Dance Radio Airplay (Billboard)	42
US Hot R&B/Hip-Hop Songs (Billboard)	55
US Mainstream Top 40 (Billboard)	7
US Pop 100 (Billboard)	2
US Rhythmic Top 40 (Billboard)	22

=== Decade-end charts ===
Decade-end chart performance for "Hollaback Girl"
Chart (2000–09)	Position
US Billboard Hot 100	41

== Certifications ==
Certifications for "Hollaback Girl"
Region	Certification	Certified units/sales
Australia (ARIA)	Platinum	70,000^{^}
Brazil (Pro-Música Brasil)	Gold	30,000^{‡}
Denmark (IFPI Danmark)	Gold	45,000^{‡}
Germany (BVMI)	Gold	150,000^{‡}
New Zealand (RMNZ)	3× Platinum	90,000^{‡}
United Kingdom (BPI)	Platinum	600,000^{‡}
United States (RIAA)	6× Platinum	6,000,000^{‡}
United States (RIAA) Mastertone	Platinum	1,000,000^{*}
^{*} Sales figures based on certification alone.^{^} Shipments figures based on certification alone.^{‡} Sales+streaming figures based on certification alone.

== Release history ==
Release dates and formats for "Hollaback Girl"
Region	Date	Format	Label	Ref.
United States	March 22, 2005	Digital download	Interscope	
United States	April 4, 2005	Contemporary hit radio	Interscope	
United States	April 5, 2005	12-inch vinyl	Interscope	
Australia	May 23, 2005	CD	Interscope	
United Kingdom	May 23, 2005	CD	Interscope	

== See also ==
- List of Billboard Hot 100 number-one singles of 2005
- List of Billboard Mainstream Top 40 number-one songs of 2005
- List of number-one singles of 2005 (Australia)
