= Run It! =

2005 single by Chris Brown featuring Juelz Santana

Single by Chris Brown featuring Juelz Santana

from the album Chris Brown
- Released: June 30, 2005
- Studio: The Hit Factory Criteria (Miami); Battery Studios (New York City)
- Genre: R&B; crunk
- Length: 3:50 (album): 3:14 (no rap); 4:04 (remix); 3:15 (spanish remix)
- Label: Jive
- Songwriters: Scott Storch; Sean Garrett; LaRon James
- Producer: Scott Storch

Chris Brown singles chronology
"Run It!" (2005)	"Yo (Excuse Me Miss)" (2005)

Juelz Santana singles chronology
"Oh Yes" (2005)	"Run It!" (2005)	"Clockwork" (2005)

Music video
- "Run It!" on YouTube

"Run It!" is the debut single by American singer Chris Brown featuring American rapper Juelz Santana. It was produced by Scott Storch, who wrote the song alongside Sean Garrett and Santana. The song appeared on Brown's self-titled debut album (2005), and was released as a single on June 30, 2005. The remix features fellow American rappers Bow Wow and Jermaine Dupri also have a Spanish Remix with Arcangel & De La Ghetto. Was performed at the 2006 Nickelodeon Kids Choice Awards by Bow Wow and Chris Brown.

Commercially, the song topped the charts in the United States, Australia and New Zealand. "Run It!" also managed to peak inside the top ten in six other countries and the top twenty in another five. The song's music video, directed by Erik White, earned nominations at the 2006 MTV Video Music Awards for Best New Artist and Viewer's Choice and won in the Best R&B Video category at the 2006 MTV Australia Awards.

== Background and composition ==
The song was recorded at The Hit Factory Criteria, in Miami, during the sessions for Brown's self-titled first studio album. Scott Storch talked about the making of the track in a 2020 interview: "At that moment in my life, I was literally on fire (..) And [Chris Brown] came in, he was just about to turn 16, and I didn’t know how to do anything except make you a hit record, like that’s the only thing I could do. I was in there every day, every minute, every hour in the studio. And it was me, Sean Garrett, and we literally, immediately, made something so effortlessly. And I had told him right before we started making it, I was like, ‘I’m about to make you a number one song and you’ll be a superstar.’" In a 2023 interview, Brown recalled that he felt insecure about releasing "Run It!" as his first single: "I [didn't] know if I liked the song, because I was too nervous in my head (..) but I knew I wanted to dance in it".

"Run It" was released as Brown's debut single on June 30, 2005, through digital distribution, as a solo version. On July 19, 2005, Jive and Zomba Records serviced the song to rhythmic crossover radio in the United States, with Juelz Santana being added as a featuring artist to it. They later solicited the song to contemporary hit radio on October 3, 2005. "Run It" was written and produced by Scott Storch and Sean Garrett, and features vocals by Juelz Santana. Santana's introduction on the song interpolates The Waitresses' 1980 single "I Know What Boys Like", written by Christopher Butler. The track is composed in the key of C♯ Phrygian as a Crunk&B song, that was described for having "slinky synth beats", a "catchy chorus", and an "ominous, creepy background". Christian Hoard of Rolling Stone compared the song's musicality to the 2004 single "Yeah!" by Usher, stating that it features a "mix of smooth seduction and cunning come-ons in Brown's baby-mack vocals."

== Critical reception ==
Lyana Robertson of Vibe, praised "Run It!" as a "prelude to what Brown would continue to do for the next decade: relentlessly disrupt the constructs of rhythm and blues", noting that with the song "the young singer began an evolution of the genre." Bill Lamb of About.com awarded "Run It!" a four-star rating, commending the song's backing music, Brown's voice, and chorus, but called it "another cookie cutter Scott Storch production." Andy Kellman of AllMusic noted it as one of the album's top tracks, commenting that the song's "way of tempering Brown's small-town innocence with hard-edged backing and a guest spot from an MC of ill repute is clearly a strategy to make the singer appeal to more than tween girls." Christian Hoard of Rolling Stone commended the song calling it a "hot single". HotNewHipHop listed "Run It!" among the singer's best singles, stating that it "laid the foundation for his future hits, establishing him as a fresh and dynamic force in the music industry".

== Chart performance ==
"Run It!" debuted at number 92 on the Billboard Hot 100 in the issue dated August 27, 2005. After eight weeks on the chart, the song entered the top ten at number eight on October 22, 2005, receiving the airplay gainer title. It gained the airplay title again in the following week, climbing to number two on the chart, where it stalled for a month. On November 26, 2005, "Run It!" peaked on the Billboard Hot 100 at number one, becoming Brown's first number one single on the chart, and making him the third youngest solo artist to top the chart, behind only Stevie Wonder and Peggy March, and the fourth youngest overall. That same week, the song was also at the top of the US Hot R&B/Hip-Hop Songs and the US Radio Songs. Two weeks later, it topped the US Pop Songs chart. The song remained on top of the Hot 100 for five weeks, becoming his longest lasting number one single on the chart. It was certified 5x multi-platinum by the Recording Industry Association of America (RIAA) for shipments of five million copies.

"Run It!" debuted and peaked at number one on the Australian Singles Chart in the issue dated January 29, 2006. The song remained at the top of the chart for three non-consecutive weeks and exited after fifteen weeks. It earned a gold certification from the Australian Recording Industry Association (ARIA), denoting shipments of 35,000 copies. In New Zealand, the song entered the singles chart at number 39 on the week ending January 2, 2006. Six weeks later, the song peaked at the top of the chart, where it remained for one month. "Run It!" entered the Swiss Singles Chart at number twelve on the week ending February 12, 2006. In the next week, it peaked at number five and remained in the top ten for six consecutive weeks.

== Music video ==
A music video for "Run It!" was released on August 8, 2005. Directed by Erik White, it portrays an underground dance inside a school gym, where Brown meets a girl (portrayed by Destiny Lightsy) that he is suddenly attracted to and with whom he wants to dance. The video features several dance sequences in which the men and women dance off against each other. During the sequences, Brown makes several movements toward his love interest. At the end, Brown and his love interest are about to kiss before the security guards arrive, and the whole gym is evacuated, with both of them pulled in separate directions. However, as soon as the guards find nobody there, they start dancing. The music video received two nominations at the 2006 MTV Video Music Awards for Best New Artist and Viewer's Choice, but lost to Avenged Sevenfold's "Bat Country" and Fall Out Boy's "Dance, Dance", respectively. The music video on YouTube has received over 200 million views as of July 2024.

== Credits ==
Credits adapted from Chris Brown liner notes, Columbia Records.

- Scott Storch – songwriting, production
- Sean Garrett – songwriting, production
- Brian Stanley – mix engineer
- Val Braithwaite – assistant mix engineer
- Mike Tschupp – assistant mix engineer
- Herb Powers Jr. – mastering engineer
- Charles McCrorey – recording engineer
- Conrad Golding – recording engineer
- Alonzo Vargas – recording engineer
- Wayne Allison – recording engineer

== Track listings ==
US CD single

1. "Run It!" (feat. Juelz Santana) – 3:49
2. "Run It!" (Main Version) – 3:15
3. "Run It!" (Instrumental) – 3:14
4. "Run It!" (Video) – 4:09

European CD single

1. "Run It!" (feat. Juelz Santana) – 3:49
2. "Run It! (Remix)" (feat. Bow Wow & Jermaine Dupri ) – 4:04
3. "Run It!" (Main Version – No Rap) – 3:15
4. "Run It!" (Instrumental) – 3:14
5. "Run It!" (Video) – 4:09

European CD single

1. "Run It!" (feat. Juelz Santana) – 3:49
2. "I May Never Find" – 4:35

Special Dutch CD Edition

1. "Run It!" (feat. Juelz Santana) – 3:50
2. "Run It!" (feat. The Partysquad) – 3:22

Vinyl

1. "Run It!" (feat. Juelz Santana) – 3:50
2. "Run It!" (Main Version) – 3:14

Vinyl remix

1. "Run It! (Remix)" (feat. Bow Wow & Jermaine Dupri) – 4:04
2. "Run It! (Remix)" (Instrumental) – 4:04

== Charts ==
=== Weekly charts ===
Weekly chart performance for "Run It!"
Chart (2005–2006)	Peak position
Australia (ARIA)	1
Australian Urban (ARIA)	1
Austria (Ö3 Austria Top 40)	12
Belgium (Ultratop 50 Flanders)	23
Belgium (Ultratop 50 Wallonia)	26
Canada CHR/Pop Top 30 (Radio & Records)	2
Czech Republic Airplay (ČNS IFPI)	55
Denmark (Tracklisten)	13
Europe (Eurochart Hot 100)	1
Finland (Suomen virallinen lista)	7
France (SNEP)	19
Global Dance Songs (Billboard)	11
Germany (GfK)	5
Hungary (Single Top 40)	10
Ireland (IRMA)	2
Italy (FIMI)	12
Netherlands (Dutch Top 40)	11
Netherlands (Single Top 100)	9
New Zealand (Recorded Music NZ)	1
Norway (VG-lista)	13
Russia Airplay (TopHit)	24
Scottish Singles Sales (Official Charts)	5
Switzerland (Schweizer Hitparade)	5
Sweden (Sverigetopplistan)	34
UK Singles (Official Charts)	2
UK Hip Hop/R&B (Official Charts)	1
US Billboard Hot 100	1
US Dance Airplay (Billboard)	24
US Hot R&B/Hip-Hop Songs (Billboard)	1
US Hot Latin Songs (Billboard)	47
US Latin Airplay (Billboard)	47
US Latin Rhythm Airplay (Billboard)	19
US Pop Airplay (Billboard)	1
US Rhythmic Airplay (Billboard)	1

=== Year-end charts ===
2005 year-end chart performance for "Run It!"
Chart (2005)	Position
US Billboard Hot 100	42
US Top R&B/Hip-Hop Songs (Billboard)	37

2006 year-end chart performance for "Run It!"
Chart (2006)	Position
Australia (ARIA)	20
Austria (Ö3 Austria Top 40)	74
Belgium (Ultratop 50 Flanders)	86
Europe (Eurochart Hot 100)	38
Germany (Media Control GfK)	36
Netherlands (Dutch Top 40)	99
New Zealand (RIANZ)	5
Russia Airplay (TopHit)	50
Switzerland (Schweizer Hitparade)	43
UK Singles (OCC)	59
UK Urban (Music Week)	15
US Billboard Hot 100	16
US Hot R&B/Hip-Hop Songs (Billboard)	43
US Rhythmic Airplay (Billboard)	17

=== Decade-end charts ===
Decade-end chart performance for "Run It!"
Chart (2000–2009)	Rank
US Billboard Hot 100	34

=== All-time charts ===
All-time chart performance for "Run It!"
Chart (1958–2018)	Position
US Billboard Hot 100	191

== Certifications ==
Certifications for "Run It!"
Region	Certification	Certified units/sales
Australia (ARIA)	3× Platinum	210,000^{^}
Brazil (Pro-Música Brasil)	Platinum	60,000^{*}
Brazil (Pro-Música Brasil) Jason Nevins Extended Mix	Platinum	60,000^{*}
Canada (Music Canada) (Ringtone)	Gold	20,000^{*}
Denmark (IFPI Danmark)	Gold	45,000^{‡}
Germany (BVMI)	Gold	150,000^{‡}
New Zealand (RMNZ)	3× Platinum	90,000^{‡}
Norway (IFPI Norway)	Gold	5,000^{*}
United Kingdom (BPI)	Platinum	600,000^{‡}
United States (RIAA)	5× Platinum	5,000,000^{‡}
United States (RIAA) (Mastertone)	Platinum	1,000,000^{*}
^{*} Sales figures based on certification alone.^{^} Shipments figures based on certification alone.^{‡} Sales+streaming figures based on certification alone.

== Radio and release history ==
Release dates and formats for "Run It!"
Country	Date	Format	Label
Various	June 30, 2005	Digital download	Zomba Records
United States	July 19, 2005	Rhythmic crossover	Jive Records; Zomba Records
United States	October 3, 2005	Contemporary hit radio	Jive Records; Zomba Records
Australia	January 30, 2006	EP	Zomba Records
New Zealand	January 30, 2006	EP	Zomba Records
Austria	January 30, 2006	Single (featuring Juelz Santana)	Zomba Records
Belgium	January 30, 2006	Single (featuring Juelz Santana)	Zomba Records
Brazil	January 30, 2006	Single (featuring Juelz Santana)	Zomba Records
Denmark	January 30, 2006	Single (featuring Juelz Santana)	Zomba Records
Finland	January 30, 2006	Single (featuring Juelz Santana)	Zomba Records
France	January 30, 2006	Single (featuring Juelz Santana)	Zomba Records
Germany	January 30, 2006	Single (featuring Juelz Santana)	Zomba Records
Ireland	January 30, 2006	Single (featuring Juelz Santana)	Zomba Records
Italy	January 30, 2006	Single (featuring Juelz Santana)	Zomba Records
Mexico	January 30, 2006	Single (featuring Juelz Santana)	Zomba Records
Netherlands	January 30, 2006	Single (featuring Juelz Santana)	Zomba Records
New Zealand	January 30, 2006	Single (featuring Juelz Santana)	Zomba Records
Norway	January 30, 2006	Single (featuring Juelz Santana)	Zomba Records
Spain	January 30, 2006	Single (featuring Juelz Santana)	Zomba Records
Sweden	January 30, 2006	Single (featuring Juelz Santana)	Zomba Records
Switzerland	January 30, 2006	Single (featuring Juelz Santana)	Zomba Records
United Kingdom	January 30, 2006	Single (featuring Juelz Santana)	Zomba Records

== See also ==
- List of Billboard Hot 100 number-one singles of 2005
- List of Billboard Mainstream Top 40 number-one songs of 2005
- List of number-one R&B singles of 2005 (U.S.)
- List of number-one singles in Australia in 2006
- List of number-one singles from the 2000s
