= List of Billboard Hot 100 top-ten singles in 2006 =

This is a list of singles that peaked in the Top 10 of the Billboard Hot 100 during 2006.

Chris Brown scored four top ten hits during the year with "Run It!", "Yo (Excuse Me Miss)", "Say Goodbye", and "Shortie Like Mine", the most among all other artists.

== Top-ten singles ==
Key

- ↑ – indicates single's top 10 entry was also its Hot 100 debut
- † – indicates Best performing song of the year
- (#) – 2006 year-end top 10 single position and rank

List of Billboard Hot 100 top ten singles which peaked in 2006
Top ten entry date	Single	Artist(s)	Peak	Peak date	Weeks in top ten
Singles from 2005
November 26	"Laffy Taffy"	D4L	1	January 14	11
December 24	"Grillz"	Nelly featuring Paul Wall and Ali & Gipp	1	January 21	13
December 31	"Check on It" (#10)	Beyoncé featuring Bun B and Slim Thug	1	February 4	14
December 31	"There It Go (The Whistle Song)"	Juelz Santana	6	January 28	5
Singles from 2006
January 14	"Dance, Dance"	Fall Out Boy	9	January 14	1
January 21	"Dirty Little Secret"	The All-American Rejects	9	January 21	3
January 28	"Be Without You"	Mary J. Blige	3	February 11	14
February 4	"You're Beautiful" (#4)	James Blunt	1	March 11	15
February 11	"Breaking Free"	Zac Efron, Drew Seeley and Vanessa Anne Hudgens	4	February 11	1
February 11	"So Sick"	Ne-Yo	1	March 18	11
February 11	"Unpredictable"	Jamie Foxx featuring Ludacris	8	February 11	3
February 11	"Unwritten" (#6)	Natasha Bedingfield	5	April 29	13
February 18	"I'm 'n Luv (Wit a Stripper)"	T-Pain featuring Mike Jones	5	February 18	9
February 18	"Shake That"	Eminem featuring Nate Dogg	6	February 25	3
February 18	"Yo (Excuse Me Miss)"	Chris Brown	7	February 18	8
February 25	"Temperature" (#2)	Sean Paul	1	April 1	17
March 11	"Everytime We Touch"	Cascada	10	March 11	1
March 18	"Lean wit It, Rock wit It"	Dem Franchize Boyz featuring Lil Peanut and Charlay	7	April 1	8
March 25	"Bad Day" † (#1)	Daniel Powter	1	April 8	14
April 8	"Ms. New Booty"	Bubba Sparxxx featuring Ying Yang Twins and Mr. Collipark	7	May 13	6
April 15	"What You Know"	T.I.	3	April 22	8
April 22	"What Hurts the Most"	Rascal Flatts	6	April 29	2
April 29	"Control Myself"	LL Cool J featuring Jennifer Lopez	4	April 29	2
April 29	"Dani California"	Red Hot Chili Peppers	6	May 27	7
May 6	"Ridin'" (#8)	Chamillionaire featuring Krayzie Bone	1	June 3	12
May 13	"SOS"	Rihanna	1	May 13	6
May 13	"What's Left of Me"	Nick Lachey	6	May 13	3
May 20	"Over My Head (Cable Car)"	The Fray	8	June 3	8
May 20	"Where'd You Go"	Fort Minor featuring Holly Brook and Jonah Matranga	4	June 10	6
May 27	"Snap Yo Fingers"	Lil Jon featuring E-40 and Sean Paul of the YoungBloodZ	7	May 27	9
June 3	"Promiscuous" (#3)	Nelly Furtado featuring Timbaland	1	July 8	17
June 10	"Hips Don't Lie" (#5)	Shakira featuring Wyclef Jean	1	June 17	10
June 10	"Me & U"	Cassie	3	July 22	15
June 17	"It's Goin' Down"	Yung Joc featuring Nitti	3	June 24	10
June 17	"Unfaithful"	Rihanna	6	July 22	8
July 1	"Do I Make You Proud" ↑	Taylor Hicks	1	July 1	2
July 1	"Crazy" (#7)	Gnarls Barkley	2	July 22	14
July 1	"Life Is a Highway"	Rascal Flatts	7	July 1	2
July 8	"Ain't No Other Man"	Christina Aguilera	6	July 15	9
July 15	"So What"	Field Mob featuring Ciara	10	July 15	1
July 29	"Buttons"	The Pussycat Dolls featuring Snoop Dogg	3	September 23	11
August 12	"Déjà Vu"	Beyoncé featuring Jay-Z	4	August 12	2
August 12	"London Bridge"	Fergie	1	August 19	10
August 19	"I Write Sins Not Tragedies"	Panic! at the Disco	7	August 26	3
August 19	"(When You Gonna) Give It up to Me"	Sean Paul featuring Keyshia Cole	3	September 9	6
August 26	"Sexy Love"	Ne-Yo	7	September 23	5
August 26	"Shoulder Lean"	Young Dro featuring T.I.	10	August 26	1
September 2	"Get Up"	Ciara featuring Chamillionaire	7	September 2	1
September 9	"Call Me When You're Sober"	Evanescence	10	September 9	1
September 9	"SexyBack" (#9)	Justin Timberlake	1	September 9	12
September 9	"Show Stopper"	Danity Kane featuring Yung Joc	8	September 9	1
September 16	"Chasing Cars"	Snow Patrol	5	October 14	13
September 16	"Far Away"	Nickelback	8	September 23	6
September 23	"Lips of an Angel"	Hinder	3	October 14	16
September 30	"Chain Hang Low"	Jibbs	7	October 21	5
September 30	"How to Save a Life"	The Fray	3	October 7	19
September 30	"Money Maker"	Ludacris featuring Pharrell	1	October 28	11
September 30	"Too Little Too Late"	JoJo	3	September 30	6
October 7	"Pullin' Me Back"	Chingy featuring Tyrese	9	October 7	2
October 14	"Smack That"	Akon featuring Eminem	2	November 4	17
October 21	"White & Nerdy"	"Weird Al" Yankovic	9	October 21	1
October 28	"My Love"	Justin Timberlake featuring T.I.	1	November 11	14
November 4	"Come to Me"	Diddy featuring Nicole Scherzinger	9	November 4	1
November 11	"Say Goodbye"	Chris Brown	10	November 11	2
November 18	"Irreplaceable"	Beyoncé	1	December 16	16
November 25	"Show Me What You Got"	Jay-Z	8	November 25	1
December 2	"I Wanna Love You"	Akon featuring Snoop Dogg	1	December 2	13
December 2	"Shortie Like Mine"	Bow Wow featuring Chris Brown and Johntá Austin	9	December 16	5
December 9	"Wind It Up"	Gwen Stefani	6	December 16	3

=== 2005 peaks ===
List of Billboard Hot 100 top ten singles in 2006 which peaked in 2005
Top ten entry date	Single	Artist(s)	Peak	Peak date	Weeks in top ten
September 17	"Gold Digger"	Kanye West featuring Jamie Foxx	1	September 17	19
September 24	"My Humps"	The Black Eyed Peas	3	November 5	16
October 8	"Photograph"	Nickelback	2	October 22	17
October 22	"Run It!"	Chris Brown featuring Juelz Santana	1	November 26	17
November 26	"Stickwitu"	The Pussycat Dolls	5	December 31	12
December 17	"Don't Forget About Us"	Mariah Carey	1	December 31	8

=== 2007 peaks ===
List of Billboard Hot 100 top ten singles in 2006 which peaked in 2007
Top ten entry date	Single	Artist(s)	Peak	Peak date	Weeks in top ten
November 11	"Fergalicious"	Fergie featuring will.i.am	2	January 13	14
December 16	"We Fly High"	Jim Jones	5	February 3	10
December 23	"Say It Right"	Nelly Furtado	1	February 24	14

== Artists with most top-ten songs ==
List of artists by total songs peaking in the top-ten
Artist	Numbers of songs
Chris Brown	4
Beyoncé	3
T.I.	3
Rihanna	2
Rascal Flatts	2
Sean Paul	2
Ne-Yo	2
Ciara	2
Chamillionaire	2
Yung Joc	2
The Fray	2
Ludacris	2
Eminem	2
Justin Timberlake	2
Juelz Santana	2
The Pussycat Dolls	2
Nelly Furtado	2

== See also ==
- 2006 in music
- List of Billboard Hot 100 number ones of 2006
- Billboard Year-End Hot 100 singles of 2006
