= Billboard Year-End Hot 100 singles of 2006 =

Ranking of recorded music

This is a list of Billboard magazine's Top Hot 100 songs of 2006.

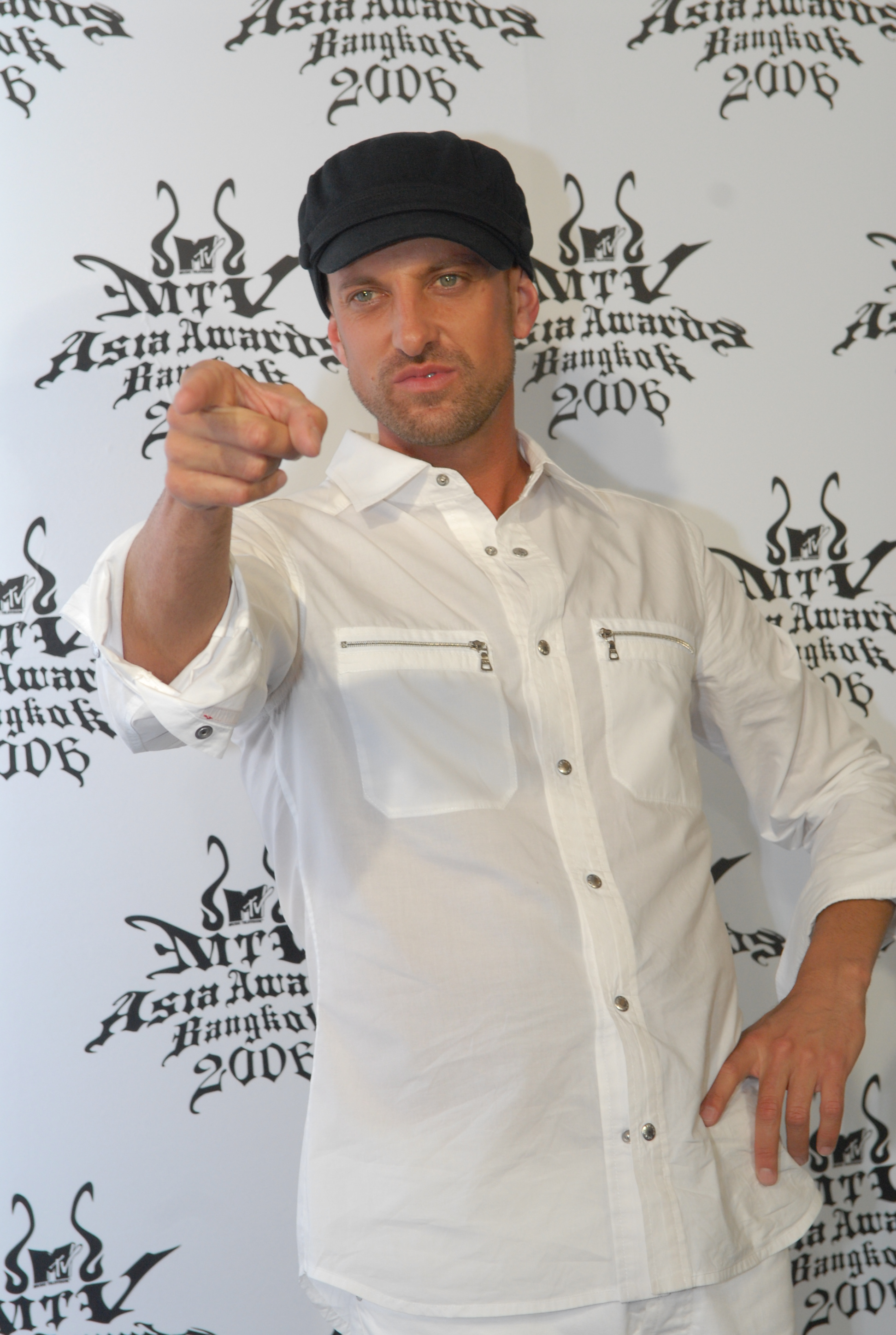
Canadian singer-songwriter Daniel Powter topped the chart with his song "Bad Day."

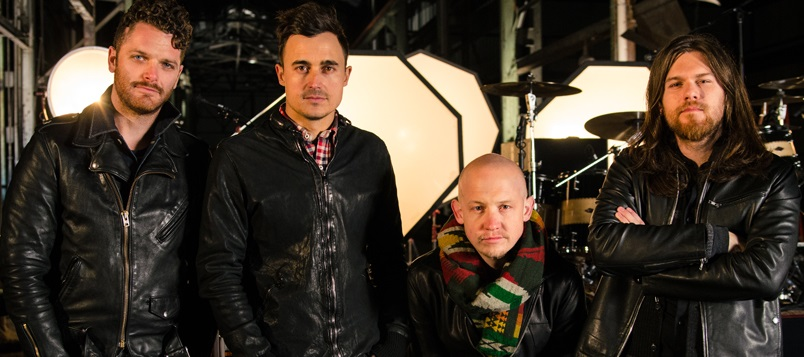
American rock band The Fray had two songs on the chart, both in the top 30: "Over My Head (Cable Car)" at 13 and "How to Save a Life" at 27.

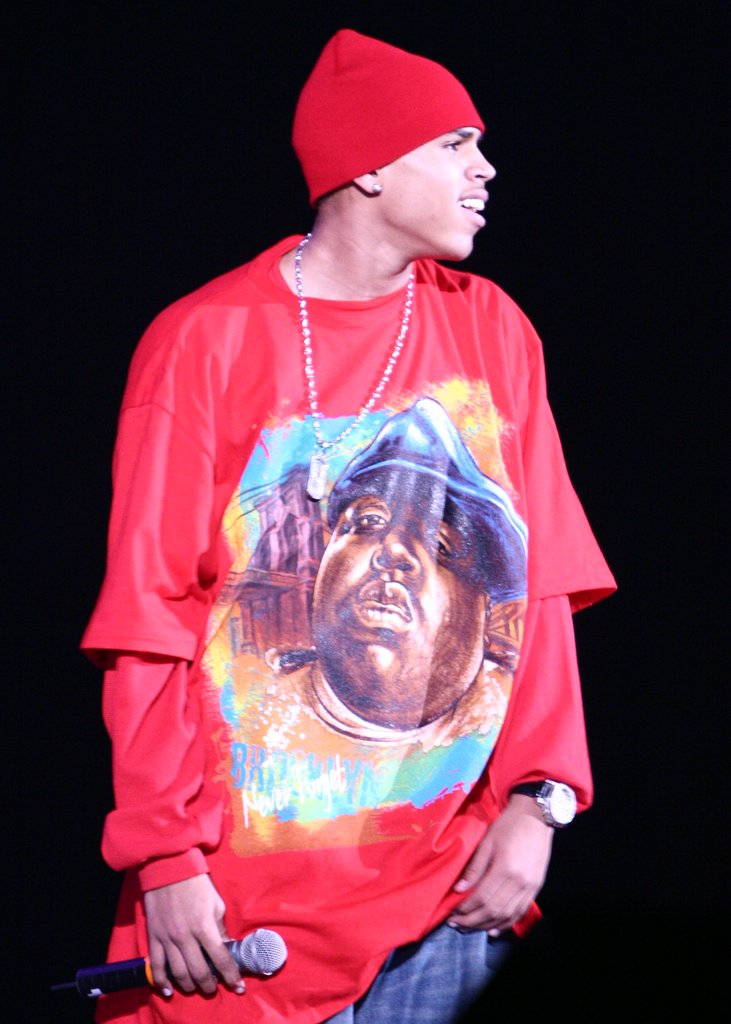
Chris Brown had four songs on the chart. "Run It!" featuring Juelz Santana was his most successful song at 16.

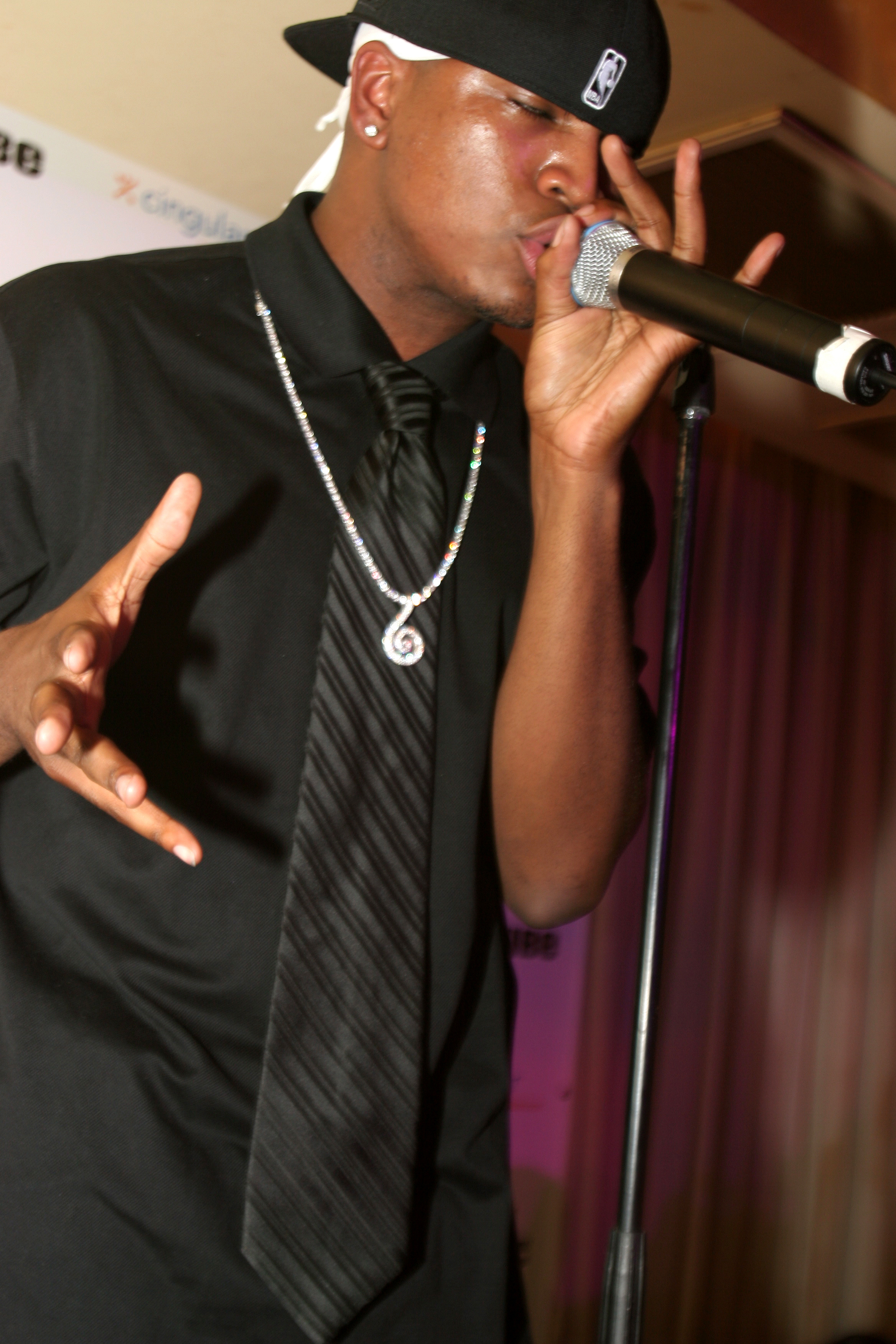
Ne-Yo had three songs on the chart from his debut album In My Own Words. The most successful of these was "So Sick" at 17.

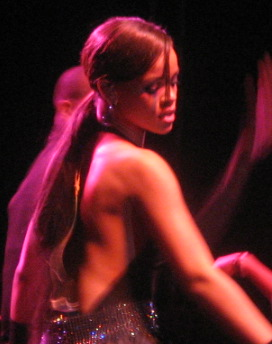
Barbadian singer Rihanna had two songs on the chart, both in the top 30: "SOS" at 19 and "Unfaithful" at 28.

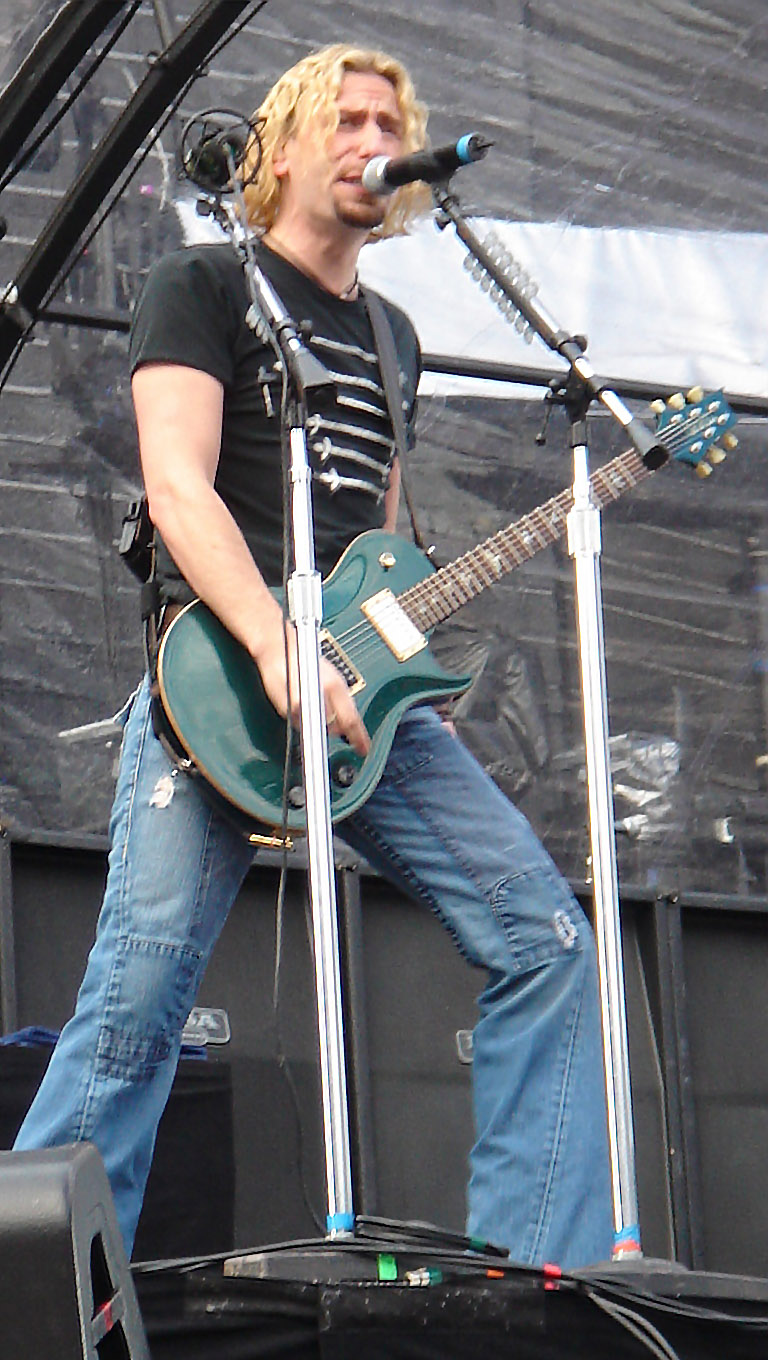
Canadian rock band Nickelback had three songs on the chart from their album All the Right Reasons. The most successful was "Photograph" at 38.

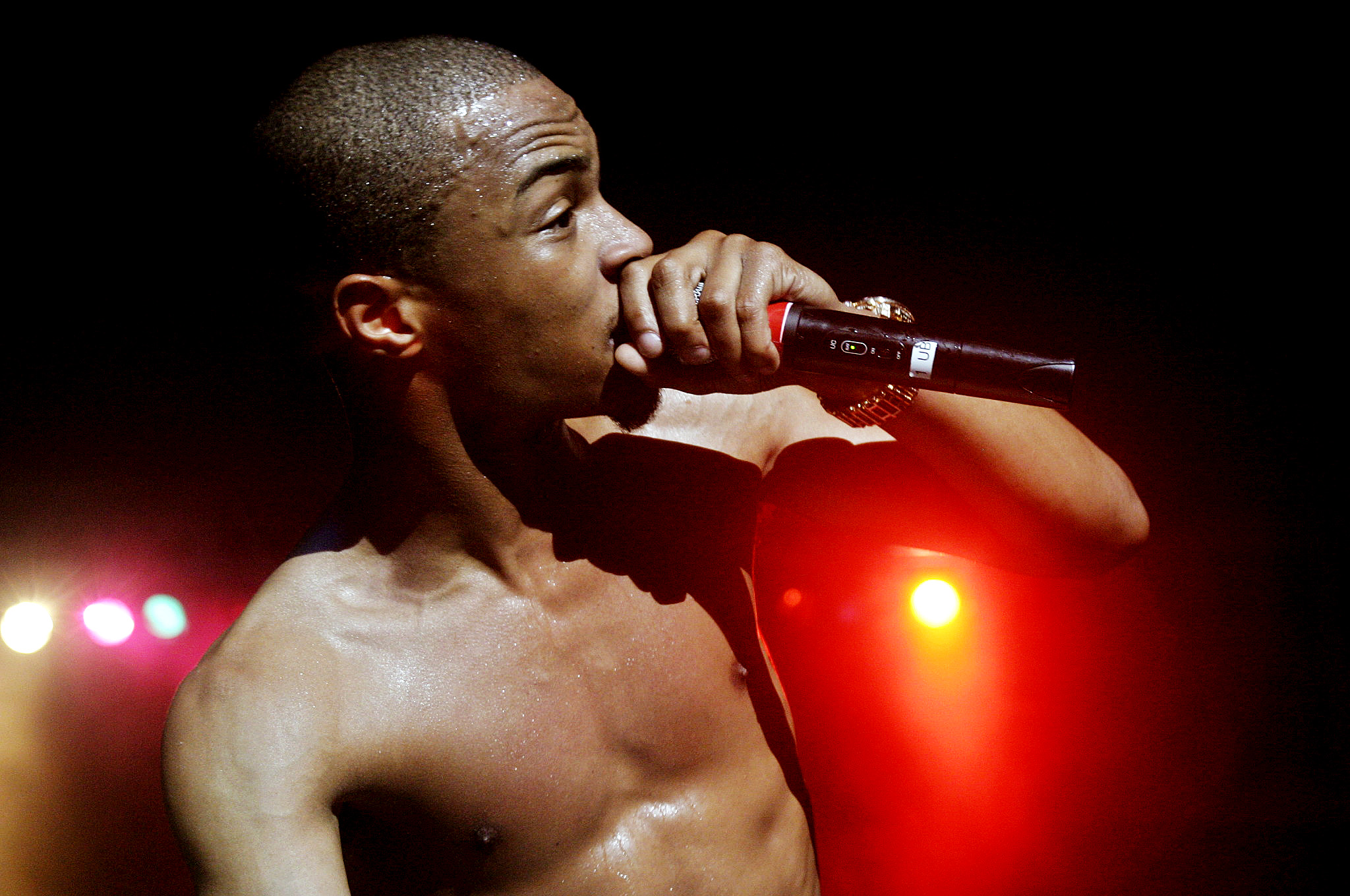
American rapper T.I. had four songs on the chart, "What You Know" was his most successful song at 47 on the chart.

No.	Title	Artist(s)
1	"Bad Day"	Daniel Powter
2	"Temperature"	Sean Paul
3	"Promiscuous"	Nelly Furtado featuring Timbaland
4	"You're Beautiful"	James Blunt
5	"Hips Don't Lie"	Shakira featuring Wyclef Jean
6	"Unwritten"	Natasha Bedingfield
7	"Crazy"	Gnarls Barkley
8	"Ridin'"	Chamillionaire featuring Krayzie Bone
9	"SexyBack"	Justin Timberlake featuring Timbaland
10	"Check on It"	Beyoncé featuring Slim Thug
11	"Be Without You"	Mary J. Blige
12	"Grillz"	Nelly featuring Paul Wall and Ali & Gipp
13	"Over My Head (Cable Car)"	The Fray
14	"Me & U"	Cassie
15	"Buttons"	Pussycat Dolls featuring Snoop Dogg
16	"Run It!"	Chris Brown featuring Juelz Santana
17	"So Sick"	Ne-Yo
18	"It's Goin' Down"	Yung Joc featuring Nitti
19	"SOS"	Rihanna
20	"I Write Sins Not Tragedies"	Panic! at the Disco
21	"Move Along"	The All-American Rejects
22	"London Bridge"	Fergie
23	"Dani California"	Red Hot Chili Peppers
24	"Snap Yo Fingers"	Lil Jon featuring E-40 and Sean Paul
25	"Lean wit It, Rock wit It"	Dem Franchize Boyz featuring Peanut and Charlay
26	"What Hurts the Most"	Rascal Flatts
27	"How to Save a Life"	The Fray
28	"Unfaithful"	Rihanna
29	"Chasing Cars"	Snow Patrol
30	"Lips of an Angel"	Hinder
31	"Everytime We Touch"	Cascada
32	"Ain't No Other Man"	Christina Aguilera
33	"Dance, Dance"	Fall Out Boy
34	"Gold Digger"	Kanye West featuring Jamie Foxx
35	"Money Maker"	Ludacris featuring Pharrell
36	"Ms. New Booty"	Bubba Sparxxx featuring Ying Yang Twins
37	"(When You Gonna) Give It Up to Me"	Sean Paul featuring Keyshia Cole
38	"Photograph"	Nickelback
39	"Because of You"	Kelly Clarkson
40	"Stickwitu"	Pussycat Dolls
41	"I'm 'n Luv (wit a Stripper)"	T-Pain featuring Mike Jones
42	"My Humps"	The Black Eyed Peas
43	"Where'd You Go"	Fort Minor featuring Holly Brook and Jonah Matranga
44	"Yo (Excuse Me Miss)"	Chris Brown
45	"Walk Away"	Kelly Clarkson
46	"Laffy Taffy"	D4L
47	"What You Know"	T.I.
48	"Dirty Little Secret"	The All-American Rejects
49	"Savin' Me"	Nickelback
50	"Don't Forget About Us"	Mariah Carey
51	"Sexy Love"	Ne-Yo
52	"U and Dat"	E-40 featuring T-Pain and Kandi Girl
53	"Far Away"	Nickelback
54	"What's Left of Me"	Nick Lachey
55	"So What"	Field Mob featuring Ciara
56	"Do It to It"	Cherish featuring Sean Paul of the YoungBloodZ
57	"Black Horse and the Cherry Tree"	KT Tunstall
58	"There It Go (The Whistle Song)"	Juelz Santana
59	"Shoulder Lean"	Young Dro featuring T.I.
60	"Unpredictable"	Jamie Foxx featuring Ludacris
61	"My Love"	Justin Timberlake featuring T.I.
62	"Shake That"	Eminem featuring Nate Dogg
63	"Pullin' Me Back"	Chingy featuring Tyrese
64	"Bossy"	Kelis featuring Too Short
65	"Chain Hang Low"	Jibbs
66	"Smack That"	Akon featuring Eminem
67	"One Wish"	Ray J
68	"Sugar, We're Goin Down"	Fall Out Boy
69	"Gimme That"	Chris Brown featuring Lil Wayne
70	"I Know You See It"	Yung Joc
71	"Who Says You Can't Go Home"	Bon Jovi featuring Jennifer Nettles
72	"Too Little Too Late"	JoJo
73	"Touch It"	Busta Rhymes
74	"Rompe"	Daddy Yankee
75	"Déjà Vu"	Beyoncé featuring Jay-Z
76	"Life Is a Highway"	Rascal Flatts
77	"Call Me When You're Sober"	Evanescence
78	"Jesus, Take the Wheel"	Carrie Underwood
79	"Show Stopper"	Danity Kane featuring Yung Joc
80	"Get Up"	Ciara featuring Chamillionaire
81	"We Be Burnin'"	Sean Paul
82	"Hate Me"	Blue October
83	"You and Me"	Lifehouse
84	"Beep"	Pussycat Dolls featuring will.i.am
85	"I Think They Like Me"	Dem Franchize Boyz featuring Jermaine Dupri, Da Brat and Bow Wow
86	"Say Goodbye"	Chris Brown
87	"Waiting on the World to Change"	John Mayer
88	"Soul Survivor"	Young Jeezy featuring Akon
89	"Pump It"	The Black Eyed Peas
90	"When I'm Gone"	Eminem
91	"Hung Up"	Madonna
92	"Stay Fly"	Three 6 Mafia featuring Young Buck and 8Ball & MJG
93	"Love"	Keyshia Cole
94	"When You're Mad"	Ne-Yo
95	"Why You Wanna"	T.I.
96	"Stupid Girls"	Pink
97	"Feel Good Inc."	Gorillaz
98	"I'm Sprung"	T-Pain
99	"Do I Make You Proud"	Taylor Hicks
100	"For You I Will (Confidence)"	Teddy Geiger

== See also ==
- 2006 in music
- Billboard Year-End Hot R&B/Hip-Hop Songs of 2006
- Billboard Year-End Hot Rap Songs of 2006
- List of Billboard Hot 100 number-one singles of 2006
- List of Billboard Hot 100 top-ten singles in 2006
