= Billboard Year-End Hot R&B/Hip-Hop Songs of 2006 =

American music chart

This is a list of Billboard magazine's Top Hot R&B/Hip-Hop Songs of 2006.

No.	Title	Artist(s)
1	"Be Without You"	Mary J. Blige
2	"Unpredictable"	Jamie Foxx
3	"So Sick"	Ne-Yo
4	"It's Goin' Down"	Yung Joc
5	"Looking for You"	Kirk Franklin
6	"Lean wit It, Rock wit It"	Dem Franchize Boyz
7	"What You Know"	T.I.
8	"Snap Yo Fingers"	Lil Jon featuring E-40 and Sean Paul
9	"Yo (Excuse Me Miss)"	Chris Brown
10	"Enough Cryin"	Mary J. Blige
11	"Grillz"	Nelly featuring Paul Wall and Ali & Gipp
12	"Torn"	LeToya
13	"Shoulder Lean"	Young Dro featuring T.I.
14	"Can't Let Go"	Anthony Hamilton
15	"Pullin' Me Back"	Chingy featuring Tyrese
16	"Sexy Love"	Ne-Yo
17	"Touch It"	Busta Rhymes
18	"Love"	Keyshia Cole
19	"Check on It"	Beyoncé featuring Slim Thug and Bun B
20	"So What"	Field Mob featuring Ciara
21	"Don't Forget About Us"	Mariah Carey
22	"Call on Me"	Janet Jackson and Nelly
23	"Why You Wanna"	T.I.
24	"I Think They Like Me"	Dem Franchize Boyz featuring Jermaine Dupri, Da Brat and Bow Wow
25	"Déjà Vu"	Beyoncé featuring Jay-Z
26	"S.E.X."	Lyfe Jennings
27	"Me & U"	Cassie
28	"Temperature"	Sean Paul
29	"One Wish"	Ray J
30	"In My Mind"	Heather Headley
31	"Money Maker"	Ludacris featuring Pharrell
32	"When You're Mad"	Ne-Yo
33	"I Know You See It"	Yung Joc featuring Brandy Hambrick
34	"Say Goodbye"	Chris Brown
35	"Gettin' Some"	Shawnna
36	"DJ Play a Love Song"	Jamie Foxx featuring Twista
37	"Gotta Go"	Trey Songz
38	"Unbreakable"	Alicia Keys
39	"Fly Like a Bird"	Mariah Carey
40	"(When You Gonna) Give It Up to Me"	Sean Paul featuring Keyshia Cole
41	"Find Myself in You"	Brian McKnight
42	"Gimme That"	Chris Brown featuring Lil Wayne
43	"Run It!"	Chris Brown featuring Juelz Santana
44	"I Should Have Cheated"	Keyshia Cole
45	"Kryptonite (I'm on It)"	Purple Ribbon All-Stars featuring Big Boi, Killer Mike, BlackOwned C-Bone and Rock D.
46	"4 Minutes"	Avant
47	"Ridin'"	Chamillionaire featuring Krayzie Bone
48	"Good Luck Charm"	Jagged Edge
49	"Hustlin'"	Rick Ross
50	"Ms. New Booty"	Bubba Sparxxx featuring Ying Yang Twins and Mr. Collipark
51	"I'm 'n Luv (wit a Stripper)"	T-Pain featuring Mike Jones
52	"Bossy"	Kelis featuring Too Short
53	"Do It to It"	Cherish featuring Sean Paul of the YoungBloodZ
54	"Rodeo"	Juvenile
55	"Ring the Alarm"	Beyoncé
56	"Stuntin' Like My Daddy"	Birdman and Lil Wayne
57	"U and Dat"	E-40 featuring T-Pain and Kandi Girl
58	"Fresh Azimiz"	Bow Wow featuring J-Kwon and Jermaine Dupri
59	"There It Go (The Whistle Song)"	Juelz Santana
60	"Take Me as I Am"	Mary J. Blige
61	"Get Up"	Ciara featuring Chamillionaire
62	"Poppin' My Collar"	Three 6 Mafia
63	"Ghetto Story"	Cham featuring Alicia Keys
64	"Just Came Here to Chill"	The Isley Brothers
65	"Back Like That"	Ghostface Killah featuring Ne-Yo
66	"Walk It Out"	Unk
67	"I Call It Love"	Lionel Richie
68	"Everytime tha Beat Drop"	Monica featuring Dem Franchize Boyz
69	"Need a Boss"	Shareefa featuring Ludacris
70	"Girl Tonite"	Twista featuring Trey Songz
71	"Soul Survivor"	Young Jeezy featuring Akon
72	"Here We Go"	Trina featuring Kelly Rowland
73	"Say I"	Christina Milian featuring Young Jeezy
74	"Stay Fly"	Three 6 Mafia featuring Young Buck and 8Ball & MJG
75	"Come to Me"	P. Diddy featuring Nicole Scherzinger
76	"Sister"	Scoundrel Squad featuring Bun B
77	"Tru Love"	Faith Evans
78	"Feels So Good"	Remy Ma featuring Ne-Yo
79	"I Love My Bitch"	Busta Rhymes featuring Kelis and will.i.am
80	"Shake It Off"	Mariah Carey
81	"I'm Sprung"	T-Pain
82	"Fireman"	Lil Wayne
83	"Laffy Taffy"	D4L
84	"Oh Yes"	Juelz Santana
85	"Money in the Bank"	Lil Scrappy featuring Young Buck
86	"Chain Hang Low"	Jibbs
87	"Push It"	Rick Ross
88	"Must Be Nice"	Lyfe Jennings
89	"Shine"	Luther Vandross
90	"Best Friend"	50 Cent and Olivia
91	"Heard 'Em Say"	Kanye West featuring Adam Levine
92	"Conceited (There's Something About Remy)"	Remy Ma
93	"We Fly High"	Jim Jones
94	"Me Time"	Heather Headley
95	"Shortie Like Mine"	Bow Wow featuring Chris Brown and Johntá Austin
96	"Nasty Girl"	The Notorious B.I.G. featuring Diddy, Nelly, Jagged Edge and Avery Storm
97	"I Refuse"	Urban Mystic
98	"Magic"	Charlie Wilson
99	"She Don't"	LeToya
100	"SexyBack"	Justin Timberlake featuring Timbaland

== See also ==
- 2006 in music
- Billboard Year-End Hot 100 singles of 2006
- Billboard Year-End Hot Rap Songs of 2006
- List of number-one R&B singles of 2006 (U.S.)
