= Billboard Year-End Hot Rap Songs of 2006 =

American music chart

This is a list of Billboard magazine's Top Hot Rap Songs of 2006.

No.	Title	Artist(s)
1	"It's Goin' Down"	Yung Joc
2	"Snap Yo Fingers"	Lil Jon featuring E-40 and Sean Paul of YoungBloodZ
3	"Lean wit It, Rock wit It"	Dem Franchize Boyz
4	"Grillz"	Nelly featuring Paul Wall and Ali & Gipp
5	"What You Know"	T.I.
6	"Pullin' Me Back"	Chingy featuring Tyrese
7	"So What"	Field Mob featuring Ciara
8	"Temperature"	Sean Paul
9	"Shoulder Lean"	Young Dro featuring T.I.
10	"Ridin'"	Chamillionare featuring Krayzie Bone
11	"U and Dat"	E-40 featuring T-Pain and Kandi Girl
12	"Ms. New Booty"	Bubba Sparxxx featuring Yin Yang Twins and Mr. Collipark
13	"Money Maker"	Ludacris featuring Pharrell
14	"(When You Gonna) Give It Up to Me"	Sean Paul featuring Keyshia Cole
15	"Why You Wanna"	T.I.
16	"I Know You See It"	Yung Joc featuring Brandy Hambrick
17	"Touch It"	Busta Rhymes
18	"I Think They Like Me"	Dem Franchize Boyz featuring Jermaine Dupri, Da Brat and Bow Wow
19	"There It Go (The Whistle Song)"	Juelz Santana
20	"Gettin' Some"	Shawnna
21	"Stay Fly"	Three 6 Mafia featuring Young Buck and 8Ball & MJG
22	"Soul Survivor"	Young Jeezy featuring Akon
23	"Fresh Azimiz"	Bow Wow featuring J-Kwon and Jermaine Dupri
24	"Laffy Taffy"	D4L
25	"Kryptonite (I'm on It)"	Purple Ribbon All-Stars featuring Big Boi, Killer Mike, BlackOwned C-Bone and Rock D.

== See also ==
- 2006 in music
- Billboard Year-End Hot 100 singles of 2006
- Billboard Year-End Hot R&B/Hip-Hop Songs of 2006
- List of Billboard number-one rap singles of 2006
