= List of number-one R&B singles of 2006 (U.S.) =

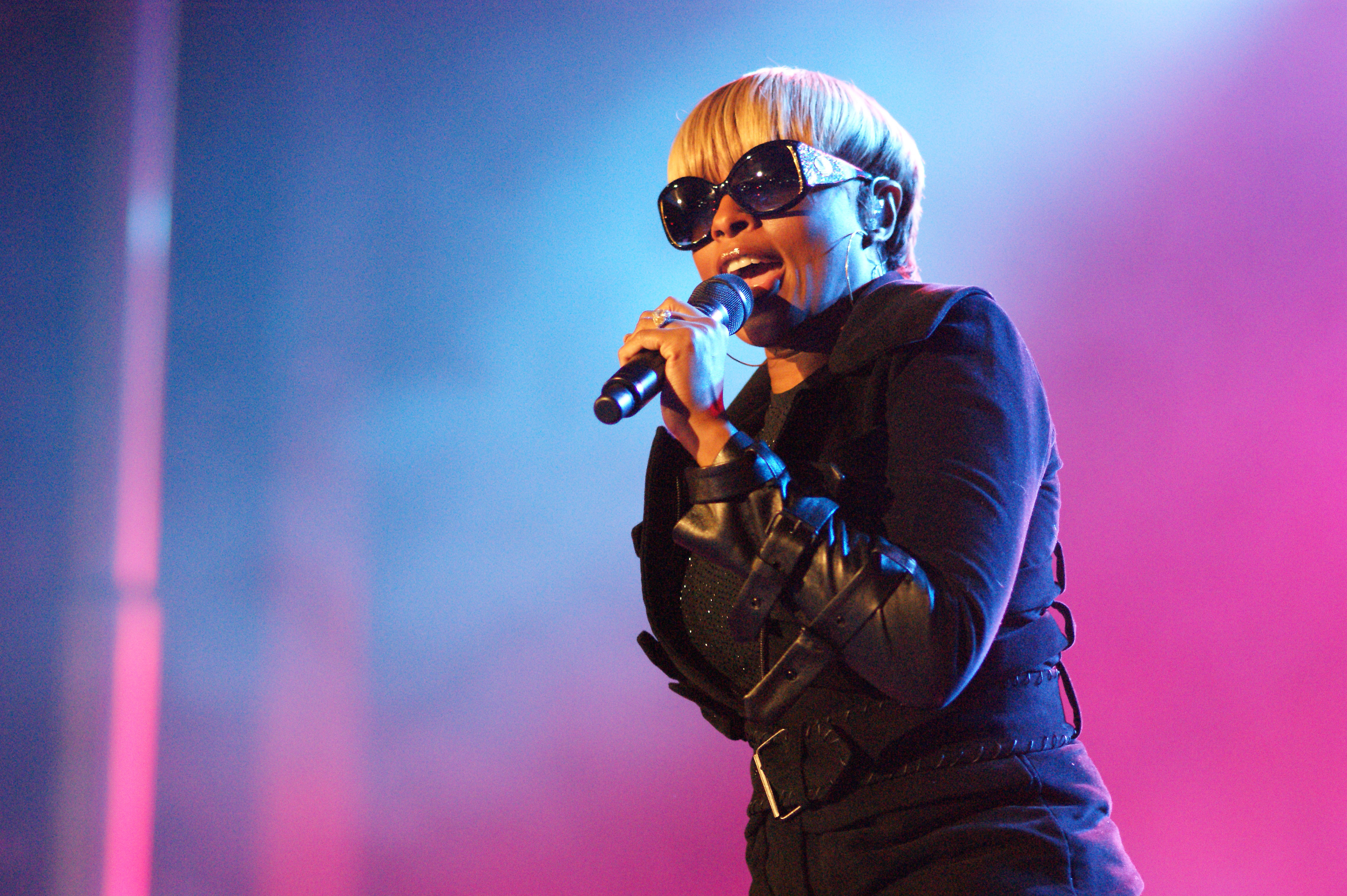
"Be Without You" by Mary J. Blige reached number one on the first chart of 2006 and held the top spot for 15 weeks.

These are the Billboard R&B singles chart number-one singles of 2006.

== Chart history ==
Key
†	Indicates best-charting R&B single of 2006

Issue date	Song	Artist
January 7	"Be Without You" †	Mary J. Blige
January 14	"Be Without You" †	Mary J. Blige
January 21	"Be Without You" †	Mary J. Blige
January 28	"Be Without You" †	Mary J. Blige
February 4	"Be Without You" †	Mary J. Blige
February 11	"Be Without You" †	Mary J. Blige
February 18	"Be Without You" †	Mary J. Blige
February 25	"Be Without You" †	Mary J. Blige
March 4	"Be Without You" †	Mary J. Blige
March 11	"Be Without You" †	Mary J. Blige
March 18	"Be Without You" †	Mary J. Blige
March 25	"Be Without You" †	Mary J. Blige
April 1	"Be Without You" †	Mary J. Blige
April 8	"Be Without You" †	Mary J. Blige
April 15	"Be Without You" †	Mary J. Blige
April 22	"What You Know"	T.I.
April 29	"What You Know"	T.I.
May 6	"What You Know"	T.I.
May 13	"What You Know"	T.I.
May 20	"What You Know"	T.I.
May 27	"What You Know"	T.I.
June 3	"It's Goin' Down"	Yung Joc
June 10	"It's Goin' Down"	Yung Joc
June 17	"It's Goin' Down"	Yung Joc
June 24	"It's Goin' Down"	Yung Joc
July 1	"It's Goin' Down"	Yung Joc
July 8	"It's Goin' Down"	Yung Joc
July 15	"It's Goin' Down"	Yung Joc
July 22	"It's Goin' Down"	Yung Joc
July 29	"Snap Yo Fingers"	Lil Jon featuring E-40 and Sean Paul of the YoungbloodZ
August 5	"Me & U"	Cassie
August 12	"Shoulder Lean"	Young Dro featuring T.I.
August 19	"Shoulder Lean"	Young Dro featuring T.I.
August 26	"Shoulder Lean"	Young Dro featuring T.I.
September 2	"Déjà Vu"	Beyoncé featuring Jay Z
September 9	"Déjà Vu"	Beyoncé featuring Jay Z
September 16	"Pullin' Me Back"	Chingy featuring Tyrese
September 23	"Call on Me"	Janet with Nelly
September 30	"Pullin' Me Back"	Chingy featuring Tyrese
October 7	"Call on Me"	Janet with Nelly
October 14	"Say Goodbye"	Chris Brown
October 21	"Say Goodbye"	Chris Brown
October 28	"Money Maker"	Ludacris featuring Pharrell
November 4	"Say Goodbye"	Chris Brown
November 11	"Say Goodbye"	Chris Brown
November 18	"Say Goodbye"	Chris Brown
November 25	"Say Goodbye"	Chris Brown
December 2	"Irreplaceable"	Beyoncé
December 9	"Irreplaceable"	Beyoncé
December 16	"Irreplaceable"	Beyoncé
December 23	"Irreplaceable"	Beyoncé
December 30	"Irreplaceable"	Beyoncé

== See also ==
- 2006 in music
- Billboard Year-End Hot R&B/Hip-Hop Songs of 2006
- List of number-one R&B hits (United States)
