= List of Billboard Hot 100 number ones of 2006 =

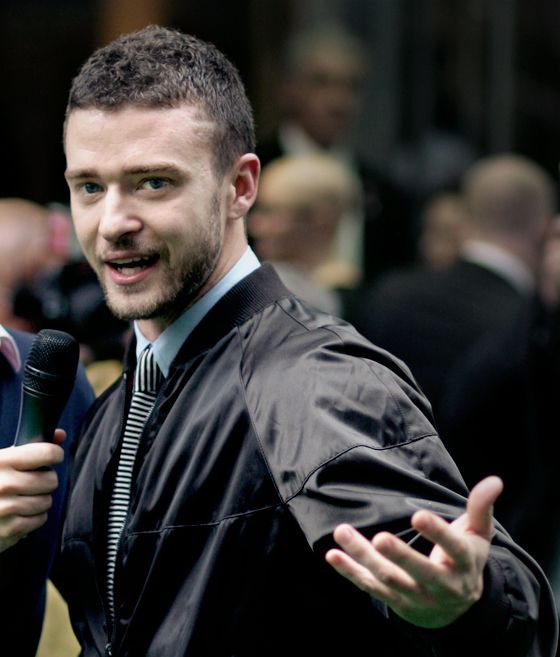
Justin Timberlake scored his first Billboard Hot 100 number-one single with "SexyBack", which stayed at the top spot for seven straight weeks.

The Billboard Hot 100 is a chart that ranks the best-performing singles of the United States. Published by Billboard magazine, the data are compiled by Nielsen SoundScan based collectively on each single's weekly physical and digital sales, and airplay. In 2006, 18 singles reached the top of the chart, the most number-ones in a chart year since 1991. A 19th single, Mariah Carey's "Don't Forget About Us", started its run at number one in 2005.

In 2006, 20 acts achieved their first U.S. number-one single, either as a lead artist or featured guest, including D4L, Paul Wall, Ali & Gipp, Slim Thug, James Blunt, Ne-Yo, Daniel Powter, Rihanna, Chamillionaire, Shakira, Wyclef Jean, Taylor Hicks, Nelly Furtado, Timbaland, Fergie, T.I., and Akon. Krayzie Bone and Justin Timberlake, despite having hit number one with Bone Thugs-n-Harmony and NSYNC respectively, earns their first number one songs as solo acts. Justin Timberlake and Beyoncé each had two number-one singles in this year. During the year, eight collaboration singles topped the chart, breaking the record set in 2003 and 2004, both of which had seven.

Beyoncé's "Irreplaceable" is the longest-running single of 2006, beginning its run atop the chart for 10 consecutive weeks in late December to late February 2007. "Irreplaceable" became the 20th single to score at least 10 weeks at number one since the era of longer-running singles began in 1992.^{[a]} Other singles with extended chart runs include Timberlake's "SexyBack", which stayed at number one for seven straight weeks, and Nelly Furtado's "Promiscuous" for six weeks. Knowles' "Check on It" and pop singer Daniel Powter's "Bad Day" both topped the chart for five weeks.

Powter's "Bad Day" is the best-performing single this year, topping the Billboard Top Hot 100 Hits of 2006. "Hips Don't Lie" gave Shakira a number-one single credit, her first since she began her recording career in 1996. The feat made her the first Colombian recording artist to have topped the Billboard Hot 100. In 2006, Powter and Furtado were the only Canadian recording acts to have reached the summit of the chart.

== Chart history ==
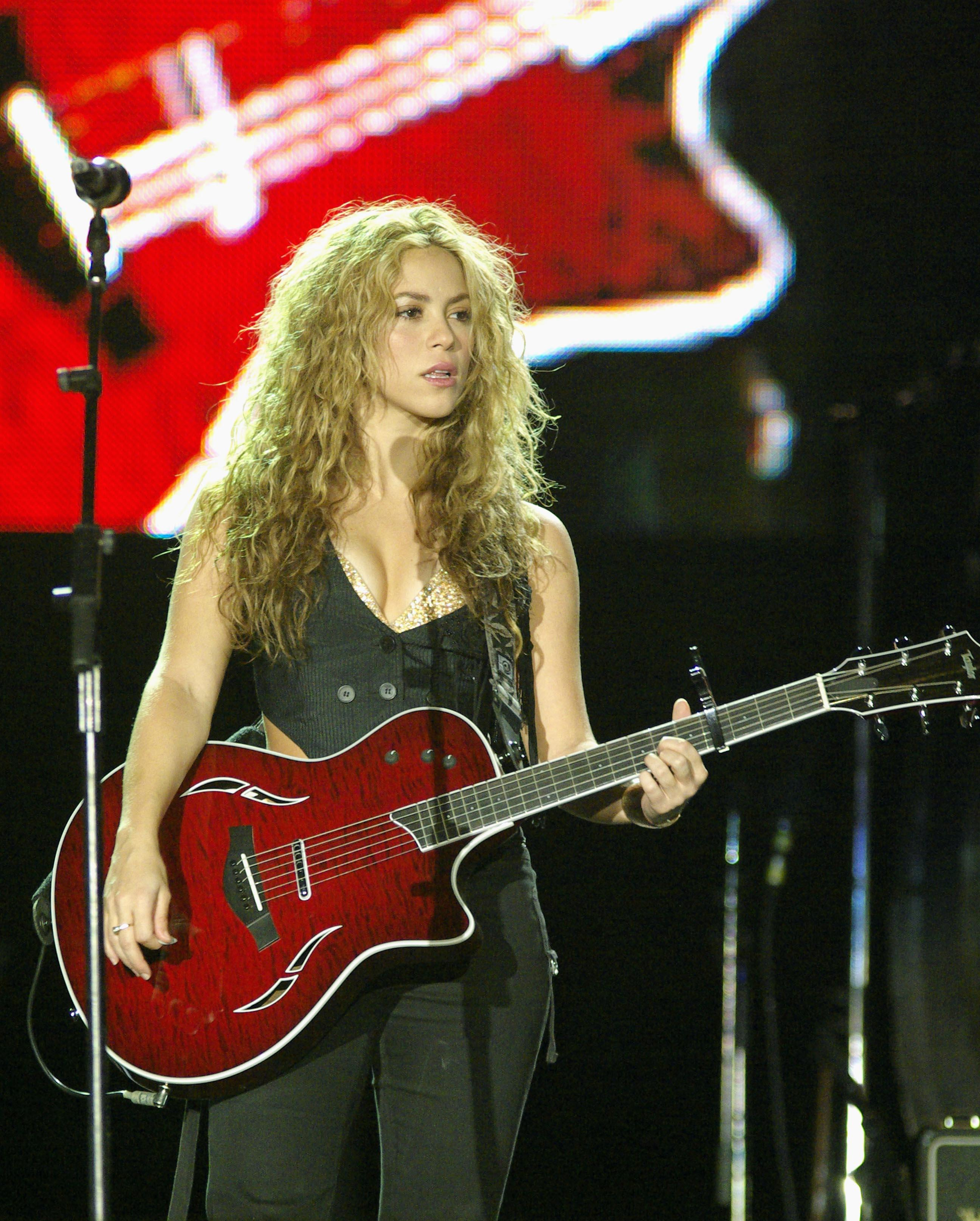
Colombian singer Shakira earned her first number one single in the United States with "Hips Don't Lie".

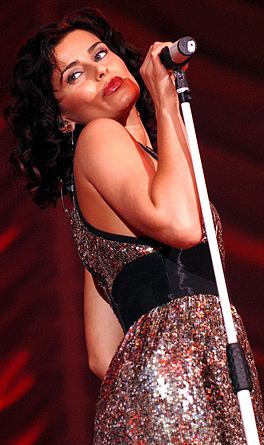
Nelly Furtado gained her first Billboard Hot 100 number-one single with "Promiscuous", which stayed at the top spot for six consecutive weeks.

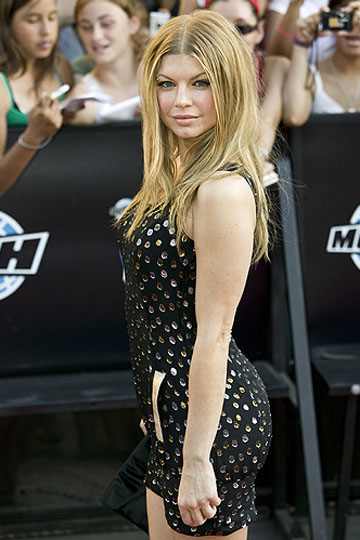
Singer Fergie earned her first number one single "London Bridge" in U.S.

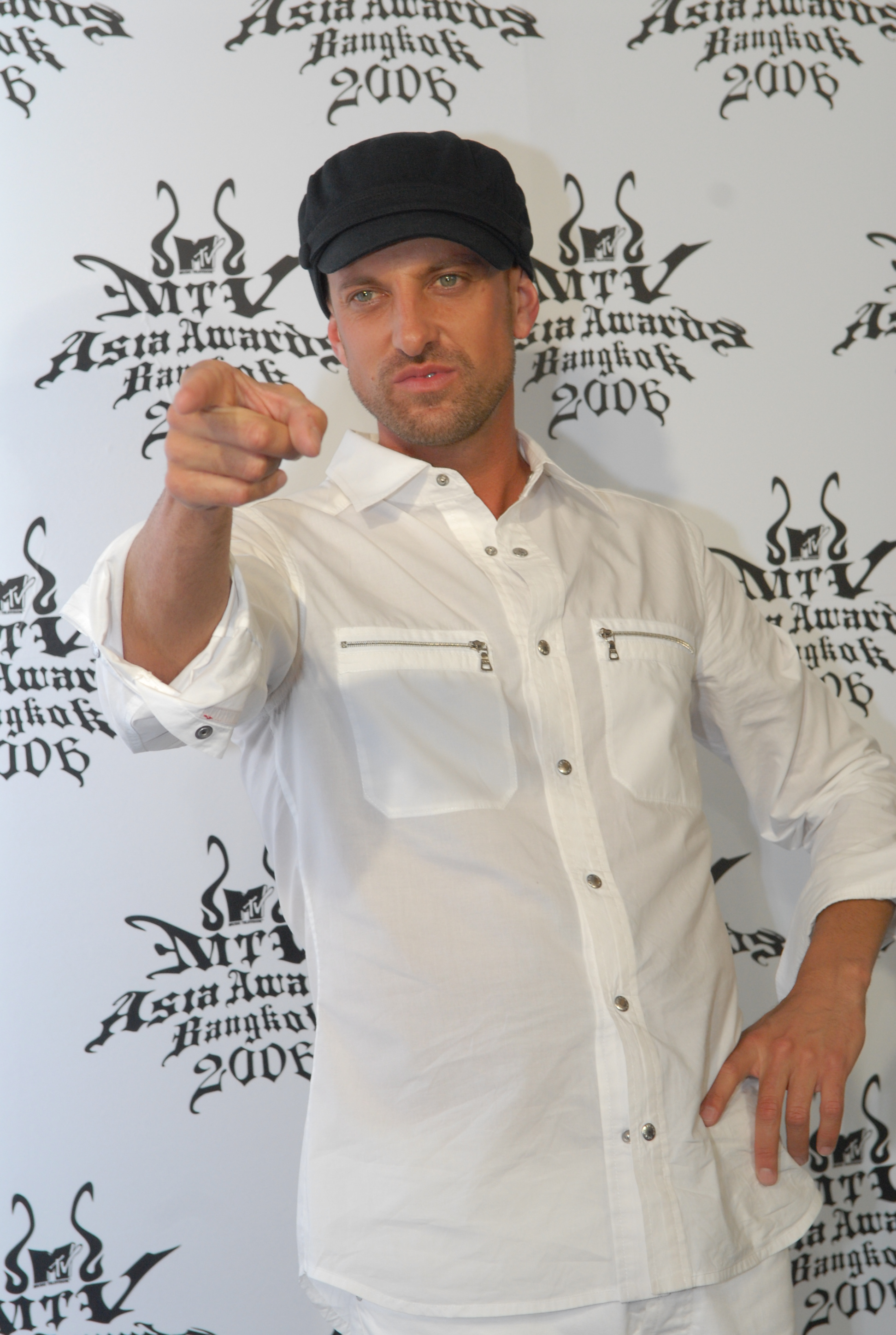
Canadian singer Daniel Powter earned his first number one single Bad Day in U.S., which stayed at the top for five consecutive weeks.

Key
†	Indicates best-performing single of 2006

No.	Issue date	Song	Artist(s)	Reference(s)
918	January 7	"Don't Forget About Us"	Mariah Carey	
919	January 14	"Laffy Taffy"	D4L	
920	January 21	"Grillz"	Nelly featuring Paul Wall, Ali & Gipp	
920	January 28	"Grillz"	Nelly featuring Paul Wall, Ali & Gipp	
921	February 4	"Check on It"	Beyoncé featuring Slim Thug	
921	February 11	"Check on It"	Beyoncé featuring Slim Thug	
921	February 18	"Check on It"	Beyoncé featuring Slim Thug	
921	February 25	"Check on It"	Beyoncé featuring Slim Thug	
921	March 4	"Check on It"	Beyoncé featuring Slim Thug	
922	March 11	"You're Beautiful"	James Blunt	
923	March 18	"So Sick"	Ne-Yo	
923	March 25	"So Sick"	Ne-Yo	
924	April 1	"Temperature"	Sean Paul	
925	April 8	"Bad Day"†	Daniel Powter	
925	April 15	"Bad Day"†	Daniel Powter	
925	April 22	"Bad Day"†	Daniel Powter	
925	April 29	"Bad Day"†	Daniel Powter	
925	May 6	"Bad Day"†	Daniel Powter	
926	May 13	"SOS"	Rihanna	
926	May 20	"SOS"	Rihanna	
926	May 27	"SOS"	Rihanna	
927	June 3	"Ridin'"	Chamillionaire featuring Krayzie Bone	
927	June 10	"Ridin'"	Chamillionaire featuring Krayzie Bone	
928	June 17	"Hips Don't Lie"	Shakira featuring Wyclef Jean	
928	June 24	"Hips Don't Lie"	Shakira featuring Wyclef Jean	
929	July 1	"Do I Make You Proud"	Taylor Hicks	
930	July 8	"Promiscuous"	Nelly Furtado featuring Timbaland	
930	July 15	"Promiscuous"	Nelly Furtado featuring Timbaland	
930	July 22	"Promiscuous"	Nelly Furtado featuring Timbaland	
930	July 29	"Promiscuous"	Nelly Furtado featuring Timbaland	
930	August 5	"Promiscuous"	Nelly Furtado featuring Timbaland	
930	August 12	"Promiscuous"	Nelly Furtado featuring Timbaland	
931	August 19	"London Bridge"	Fergie	
931	August 26	"London Bridge"	Fergie	
931	September 2	"London Bridge"	Fergie	
932	September 9	"SexyBack"	Justin Timberlake	
932	September 16	"SexyBack"	Justin Timberlake	
932	September 23	"SexyBack"	Justin Timberlake	
932	September 30	"SexyBack"	Justin Timberlake	
932	October 7	"SexyBack"	Justin Timberlake	
932	October 14	"SexyBack"	Justin Timberlake	
932	October 21	"SexyBack"	Justin Timberlake	
933	October 28	"Money Maker"	Ludacris featuring Pharrell	
933	November 4	"Money Maker"	Ludacris featuring Pharrell	
934	November 11	"My Love"	Justin Timberlake featuring T.I.	
934	November 18	"My Love"	Justin Timberlake featuring T.I.	
934	November 25	"My Love"	Justin Timberlake featuring T.I.	
935	December 2	"I Wanna Love You"	Akon featuring Snoop Dogg	
935	December 9	"I Wanna Love You"	Akon featuring Snoop Dogg	
936	December 16	"Irreplaceable"	Beyoncé	
936	December 23	"Irreplaceable"	Beyoncé	
936	December 30	"Irreplaceable"	Beyoncé	

== Number-one artists ==
List of number-one artists by total weeks at number one
Position	Artist	Weeks at No. 1
1	Justin Timberlake	10
2	Beyoncé	8
3	Nelly Furtado	6
3	Timbaland	6
5	Slim Thug	5
5	Daniel Powter	5
7	Rihanna	3
7	Fergie	3
7	T.I.	3
10	Nelly	2
10	Paul Wall	2
10	Ali & Gipp	2
10	Ne-Yo	2
10	Chamillionaire	2
10	Krayzie Bone	2
10	Shakira	2
10	Wyclef Jean	2
10	Ludacris	2
10	Pharrell	2
10	Akon	2
10	Snoop Dogg	2
22	Mariah Carey	1
22	D4L	1
22	James Blunt	1
22	Sean Paul	1
22	Taylor Hicks	1

== See also ==
- 2006 in music
- List of Billboard number-one singles
- Billboard Year-End Hot 100 singles of 2006
- List of Billboard Hot 100 number-one singles of the 2000s

== Notes ==
- [a] Longer-running singles refer to number-one singles that spent at least 10, either consecutive or non-consecutive, weeks atop the Billboard Hot 100.

== Additional sources ==
- Fred Bronson's Billboard Book of Number 1 Hits, 5th Edition (ISBN 0-8230-7677-6)
- Joel Whitburn's Top Pop Singles 1955-2008, 12 Edition (ISBN 0-89820-180-2)
- Joel Whitburn Presents the Billboard Hot 100 Charts: The 2000s (ISBN 0-89820-182-9)
- Additional information obtained can be verified within Billboard's online archive services and print editions of the magazine.
