= Do I Make You Proud =

2006 single by Taylor Hicks

Single by Taylor Hicks
- B-side: "Takin' It to the Streets"
- Released: June 13, 2006
- Recorded: Los Angeles, California
- Genre: Soul
- Length: 4:13
- Label: 19; Arista
- Songwriters: Tracy Ackerman; Andy Watkins; Paul Wilson
- Producers: Absolute; Dave Way

Taylor Hicks singles chronology
"Do I Make You Proud" (2006)	"Just to Feel That Way" (2007)

"Do I Make You Proud" is a soul-pop song written for American Idol season five winner Taylor Hicks by Tracy Ackerman, Andy Watkins and Paul Wilson of the Absolute production team, and co-produced by Dave Way. The song was released as a single on June 13, 2006 from the Arista record label.

== Background ==
Hicks first performed the song on the finale of American Idol's fifth season, for which he received outstanding comments from all three judges. Simon Cowell correctly predicted that Hicks would win that year's American Idol with the performance.

Along with "Do I Make You Proud", it includes, as a B-side track, his cover of The Doobie Brothers's "Takin' It to the Streets". The American Idol judges loved his rendition of "Takin' It to the Streets" – Randy Jackson said it was not his favorite song from Hicks, but he was trying to comprehend his dance moves onstage. Paula Abdul said that the song was great and loved the energy and dancing. Simon Cowell "loved the song" and said that "that's what it's all about — having fun and being memorable." Cowell also said it was the best performance of the night.

Hicks' rendition of "Takin' It to the Streets" would become his first song to chart, peaking at number 69 on the Billboard Hot 100, due to moderate sales of digital downloads only. The song was not released as Hicks's single, since "Do I Make You Proud" was to become his first single after he won the American Idol competition.

"Weird Al" Yankovic's 2006 album Straight Outta Lynwood included a parody of "Do I Make You Proud", called "Do I Creep You Out". It is Yankovic's first parody of a singer from the Idol television series.

== Composition ==
The song starts in C♯/D♭ major, and at the 2:54 mark, the song changes to D♯/E♭ major.

== Content ==
The lyrics communicate a feeling of pride for one's accomplishments after struggling with and then finally achieving a long-term goal, all while retaining one's humility. This reflects Hicks' sudden career transformation from an independent musical artist to a celebrity.

== Track listing ==
1. "Do I Make You Proud" (Paul Wilson, Andy Watkins, Tracy Ackerman) – 4:10
2. "Takin' It to the Streets" (Michael McDonald) – 3:37

== Chart performance ==
Billboard confirmed that "Do I Make You Proud" sold 190,000 physical singles and 38,000 digital downloads during its first week, prompting a number-one debut on the Hot 100 for the issue dated July 1, 2006. It was only the 14th song out of over 1000 number ones to debut at number one on the Hot 100 chart. Hicks also became the fourth American Idol contestant to have a single debut at number one on the Billboard Hot 100 behind Clay Aiken, Fantasia Barrino, and Carrie Underwood. As of September 2009, "Do I Make You Proud" has sold 672,000 singles.

"Do I Make You Proud" remained number-one on the Billboard Hot 100 for one week, gradually declining until it left the chart after eight weeks, making it the first number one single in the history of the US charts to fall off the charts in less than ten weeks.

The song was Taylor Hicks' only number-one hit, as well as his only top-40 hit to date, making him a one-hit wonder on the chart.

In Canada, the single reached number one on the SoundScan Physical singles chart and remained there for 17 consecutive weeks from June 10 to September 30, 2006.

In 2009 Billboard issued its Decade End Charts compiling the top artists and releases for the years 2000–2009. "Do I Make You Proud" charted at number 39 on the Decade End Singles Sales chart.

== Personnel ==
- Absolute – producers, instrumentation, and engineers (1)
- Tracy Ackerman – background vocals (1)
- John Adams – assistant mix engineer (2)
- Michael Anderson – bass, background vocals, and engineer (2)
- Derek Bramble – producer and engineer (2)
- Craig Burbidge – mixing (2)
- Andy Caine – guitars and background vocals (1)
- Joe Corcoran – digital editing (1)
- Dorian Crozier – drums and engineer (2)
- Jarrett Holly – assistant engineer (2)
- Fannie Bell Johnson – background vocals (2)
- Sara Killion – assistant engineer (1)
- A. Omar Reyna – assistant engineer (2)
- Rafael Serrano – assistant engineer (1)
- Greg Suran – guitar (2)
- Jason Villaroman – assistant engineer (1)
- Dave Way – producer, engineer, and mixing (1)
- Ramon Yslas – percussion (2)

=== Charts ===
Chart (2006)	Peak position
Canada (Nielsen SoundScan)	1
U.S. Billboard Adult Contemporary Tracks	14
U.S. Billboard Hot 100	1
U.S. Billboard Pop 100	1

=== Year-end charts ===
Chart (2006)	Position
US Billboard Hot 100	99
US Adult Contemporary (Billboard)	35

== See also ==
- List of Canadian number-one singles of 2001–07
- List of Billboard Hot 100 number-one singles of 2006
