= Check on It =

2005 single by Beyoncé

- US and Japanese editions cover

Single by Beyoncé featuring Slim Thug and Bun B

from the album #1's
- Released: December 13, 2005
- Studio: Sony (New York City); The Jim Henson Company (Los Angeles)
- Length: 3:30
- Label: Columbia; Music World
- Songwriters: Beyoncé Knowles; Kasseem Dean; Bernard Freeman; Sean Garrett; Angela Beyincé; Stayve Thomas
- Producer: Swizz Beatz

Beyoncé singles chronology
"Wishing on a Star" (2005)	"Check on It" (2005)	"Déjà Vu" (2006)

Slim Thug singles chronology
"Luxurious" (2005)	"Check on It" (2005)	"Wamp Wamp (What It Do)" (2006)

Bun B singles chronology
"Get Throwed" (2005)	"Check on It" (2005)	"Git It" (2006)

Alternative cover
- International editions cover

Music video
- "Check on It" on YouTube

"Check on It" is a song recorded by American singer Beyoncé. It was written by her, Swizz Beatz, Sean Garrett, Angela Beyincé and Slim Thug, and produced by Swizz Beatz. Serving as the main theme of the 2006 film The Pink Panther, in which Beyoncé co-starred as Xania, it was supposed to be featured on the film's soundtrack. As it was ultimately not included on the soundtrack, the version with additional vocals from Slim Thug was placed on the Destiny's Child's greatest hits album #1's (2005), while the Bun B version was included on the international and Japanese editions of Beyoncé's second studio album, B'Day (2006). Columbia Records released a remix version of "Check on It" featuring both Slim Thug and Bun B as the second single from #1's on December 13, 2005. "Check on It" is a hip-hop-influenced song, which is instrumentally complete with a heavy bassline, strings, and wind instrument. The song consists of two verse-raps by Slim Thug.

"Check on It" was not originally intended as a single from #1's. However, it received some rotation on US radio stations, after the release of the first single "Stand Up for Love" (2005), which failed to chart on the Billboard Hot 100. Eventually, "Check on It" was released as a single; it debuted on the US Hot 100 in November 2005. The song peaked at number one for five consecutive weeks, becoming one of the two longest-running number-one singles of 2006, and Beyoncé's credited third US number-one single. Internationally, it reached number one in New Zealand and the top ten in Canada and several European countries. "Check on It" was also well received by music critics, who complimented the arrangement and the vocal deliveries.

The accompanying music video for "Check on It" was directed by Hype Williams, and premiered on December 12, 2005, on MTV. The version of the song used in the video features a remix of "The Pink Panther Theme". Incorporating 1950s influences, the video was shot in pink to brand the relationship with The Pink Panther. It won Best R&B Video at the 2006 MTV Video Music Awards, and was nominated for Video of the Year at the BET Awards 2006. Beyoncé did include the song in her set list on the tours The Beyoncé Experience (2007) and I Am... World Tour (2009–2010). She also included it in her Coachella performance (2018).

== Background and release ==
"Check on It" was written by Beyoncé, Slim Thug, Angela Beyincé and Sean Garrett. Production was handled by Swizz Beatz, who also co-wrote the song. Matt Hennessy, Dave Pensado, and Dexter Simmons mixed "Check on It" with assistance from Geoffrey Rice, and Matt Serrecchio. Beyoncé said that the song's title, "Check on It", was a phrase that she and her management jokingly used several times before they decided to turn it into a song. Originally recorded by Beyoncé only, the song was supposed to be included on the track-listing of the soundtrack album for the remake of The Pink Panther (2006), starring Steve Martin, Kevin Kline and Beyoncé. However, it was never used for the soundtrack album at the last minute, and the song with added vocals from Slim Thug, was then added on Beyoncé's former group Destiny's Child's greatest hits, #1's (2005). "Check on It" was nevertheless played during The Pink Panther's end credits and used in TV spots to promote the film.

"Check on It" was not originally intended for release as a single from the album #1's. However, it received heavy rotation from US radio stations after the release of the first single "Stand Up for Love" (2005), which recorded by all members of Destiny's Child was a commercial failure. Meanwhile, "Check on It" debuted on the US Billboard Hot 100 chart in November 2005, that is, before its official release as it had amassed considerable listener impressions. A remix of the song featuring hip-hop rapper Bun B was recorded prior to its release. The task of remixing the song was undertaken by Maurice Joshua with further assistance from Junior Vasquez who helped in its production.

"Check on It" was first digitally released in the US on December 13, 2005. In the United Kingdom, a CD single was issued on January 16, 2006. "Check on It" was never released in Australia but charted as a digital track. The song was included as a bonus track on the deluxe edition of Beyoncé's second studio album, B'Day in European countries on April 3, 2007. Though the song was a commercial success worldwide, Beyoncé has revealed that she dislikes the song. She has explained that she was surprised at the commercial reception of "Check on It" as according to her, it is too simple, and not catchy like some of her previous singles.

== Composition ==
"Check on It" is a midtempo hip-hop-influenced song, which makes use of a heavy bassline, strings, wind instrument, and frequent "swinging pelvic taunts". According to the sheet music published by Sony/ATV Music Publishing at Musicnotes.com, the song is written in the key of G major and is set in common time at 166 beats per minute. Beyoncé's vocal range spans from the low note A_{3} to the high note B_{4}. According to Bill Lamb of About.com, Beyoncé adopts smooth and alluring vocals throughout "Check on It". Lyrically, the song takes place in a dance club, where the female protagonist is letting the male patrons know that they are welcome to come and look at her body when she is dancing. "Check on It" starts with a verse-rap from Slim Thug: "Good girls gotta get down with them gangstas / Go head girl put some back and some neck up on it..." The rapper sounds like a 1975 Mercury Cougar turning over as he growls in his burly purr, as written by Bret McCabe of Baltimore City Paper.

"Check on It"
A 19-second sample of "Check on It", featuring Knowles singing the chorus, which consists of "sexual teasing" lyrics, on a swaggering bassline.

In the first verse, Beyoncé sings to the "sexual teasing" lyrics, which are addressed to the men looking at her: "I can be a tease, but I really wanna please you [...] Oohhh you watchin[g] me shake it, Ya can't take it, it’s blazin[g] ...". The chorus lines; "Dip it, pop it, twerk it, stop it, check on me tonight" are sung in a very quick and breathless manner by Beyoncé. Bret McCabe noted that her pace could be compared to that of R&B singer Donna Summer. Slim Thug appears again after the second verse to perform another different verse rap: "I’m checking on you boo, do what’chu do / And while you dance I’ma glance at this beautiful view / I’m keep my hands in my pants, I need to glue ’em with glue ...". Before the song ends, Beyoncé repeats the chorus lines four times as additional vocals of hers are played in the background.

== Critical reception ==
Music critics received the song positively, complimenting Beyoncé's vocal performance, and the easiness as well as the confidence she displays while singing her lyrics. A reviewer from the UK website Contactmusic.com described "Check on It" as a "booty shaking anthem" and complimented Beyoncé for switching to a club song after "Stand Up for Love". Bret McCabe of Baltimore City Paper noted that the song is "less a DC joint than a Beyoncé sex-kitten solo". He praised the lyrics of the song and the easiness with which Beyoncé sings, highlighting her "million-selling R&B pipes". James Blake of BBC Music wrote that the lyrics are pleasantly aggressive and critical of women.

Jaime Gill of Yahoo! Music described "Check on It" as "sinuously brilliant". James Anthony of the British newspaper The Guardian wrote that the song "espouses a blissful disregard for traditional songwriting conventions. No Hova (Jay-Z) this time, but Houston rapper Slim Thug's lazy southern drawl suits the fractionally slower tempo." In the July 2006 issued copy of Spin magazine, Nick Duerden ranked the song at the seventh place on his list of The ten Beyoncé tracks you need to download, writing that "Check on It" is Beyoncé's sexiest song to date. "Check on It" was nominated in for Best Duet/Collaboration at the 2006 BET Awards, and for the Best Rap/Hip Hop Dance Track at the 2007 22nd Annual International Dance Music Awards in 2007. It also received a Broadcast Music, Inc. (BMI) Award for "Award-Winning Song".

== Commercial performance ==
"Check on It" debuted at number 72 on the US Billboard Hot 100 chart issue dated November 19, 2005. After 12 weeks on the chart, the song received the airplay gainer title, and reached number one on the Hot 100 chart issue dated February 4, 2006, becoming Beyoncé's third Hot 100 number-one as a solo artist and Slim Thug's first Hot 100 single. For the same week ending, "Check on It" was also at the top of the US Hot Digital Songs and the US Pop 100 charts. The single remained at number-one for on the Hot 100 chart for five consecutive weeks before being unseated by "You're Beautiful" by James Blunt. tying Beyoncé with Jennifer Lopez for having her first three number-one Hot 100 singles stay on top for five weeks or more. "Check on It" also tied with Canadian singer Daniel Powter's single "Bad Day" for the longest-running number-one single in 2006. "Check on It" spent a total of 28 weeks on the Hot 100.

The song also topped the US Pop Songs, the US Hot Dance Club Play, the US Rhythmic Top 40, and the Hot 100 Airplay charts. It reached number three on the US Hot R&B/Hip-Hop Songs chart. According to Mediabase and Nielsen Broadcast Data Systems, "Check on It" passed the 200 million audience impressions mark in on January 31, 2006. Another single of Beyoncé, "Irreplaceable" also passed this mark on December 11, 2006. Beyoncé thus became the second female singer to achieve this feat in the US after Mariah Carey's two singles "We Belong Together" and "Shake It Off" both passed the same mark within 2005. At the end of 2006, "Check on It" emerged as the tenth best selling, and fourth most played song on radio stations in the US. It was certified double platinum by the Recording Industry Association of America (RIAA) for sales and streams of over 2,000,000 units. As of October 2012, it has sold 1,438,000 paid digital downloads in the US.

"Check on It" debuted at number four on the UK Singles Chart on January 28, 2006. The following week, it peaked at number three and charted for 12 weeks in the top 75 positions of the UK Singles Chart. "Check on It" debuted at number 35 on the New Zealand Singles Chart on January 30, 2006, and reached number one for two consecutive weeks. In mainland Europe, "Check on It" reached the top five in Norway and the Netherlands, the top 10 in Switzerland, Denmark, and Austria, the top 20 in Germany and Sweden and top 40 in Belgium, France and Russia.

== Music video ==
When demand was growing for the song, Beyoncé decided to make a music video for it, serving as promotion for both #1's and The Pink Panther. It was directed by Hype Williams. The version of "Check on It" used in the clip features a remix of "The Pink Panther Theme" and a verse-rap from Bun B. The video premiered on December 12, 2005, on MTV, and was included on the DVD of The Pink Panther. The video was shot in 20 hours and features Beyoncé in 8 different set-ups and outfits. It incorporates 1950s influences. Hype Williams told Margeaux Watson of Entertainment Weekly that the concept was to make everything pink to brand the relationship with The Pink Panther. He added that the pink sails reflect the wind instrument sound of the string section. Speaking about the video to MTV, Beyoncé said:

['Check on It'] is so fun, it makes you feel like a child again and we wanted to put some of that in the choreography and the feel of the video. It's all about checking on yourself and making sure you're moving tight and your man admiring how you move. It's simple."

In the video, Beyoncé is seen mostly in all pink, and the dancers wear PVC jackets and dance around rippling satin sheets. She occasionally bends over and grabs her behind. The video cuts to Beyoncé wearing a polka dot corset against a hot pink polka-dotted wall, wearing a pink wig and pink lipstick. Where black bars normally appear on a 4:3 (full screen) television showing a widescreen production, footage is displayed of curtains moving in the background. This was a trend in the videos directed by Williams during that year, with the effect being used in Ne-Yo's 2006 single "So Sick" and Jamie Foxx's 2005 single "Unpredictable". "Check on It" won the Best R&B Video at the 2006 MTV Video Music Awards. It was also nominated for Video of the Year at the 2006 BET Awards.

== Live performances ==
Although Beyoncé did not perform "Check on It" on televised appearances, it was a part of her set list on The Beyoncé Experience at the Staples Center in Los Angeles and I Am... World Tour during various stops. In Los Angeles, Beyoncé performed segments of the song, dressed in a golden, translucent slip and golden, sparkling panties. It was executed without backup dancers or live instrumentation, only backup singers toward the performance's conclusion. When Beyoncé performed the song in Sunrise, Florida on June 29, 2009, she was wearing a glittery, golden leotard. As she sang, animated graphics of turntables, faders and other club equipment were projected behind Beyoncé, her dancers and musicians. "Check on It" was subsequently included as the sixteenth track and the twentieth track on her live albums The Beyoncé Experience Live (2007), and I Am... World Tour (2010) respectively. Beyoncé also performed the song as part of her acclaimed performance at Coachella in April 2018.

== Formats and track listings ==
- International remixes EP (feat. Bun B & Slim Thug)
1. "Check on It" – 3:30
2. "Check on It" (Junior Vasquez Club Mix) – 8:31
3. "Check on It" (Maurice's Nu Soul Mix) – 5:59
4. "Check on It" (King Klub Mix) – 6:48
5. "Check on It" (Bama Boyz Remix) – 3:54
- Canada and Europe single (feat. Slim Thug)
1. "Check on It" – 3:31
2. "Check on It" (No Rap Version) – 3:08
- US single (feat. Voltio)
1. "Check on It" (Bama Boyz Reggaeton Remix) – 3:28
2. "Check on It" (Bama Boyz Reggaeton Remix Instrumental) – 3:28

== Personnel ==
Credits are lifted from the official booklet of #1's and B'Day.

- Vocals – Beyoncé Knowles, Slim Thug, Bun B
- Background Vocals - Kelly Rowland (uncredited), Michelle Williams (uncredited)
- Songwriting – Beyoncé Knowles, Angela Beyince, Swizz Beatz, Sean Garrett, Slim Thug
- Production – Beyoncé Knowles, Swizz Beatz
- Vocal production – Beyoncé Knowles
- Recording engineers – Jim Caruana, Nathan Jenkins
  - Assistance – Geoffrey Rice, Matt Serrecchio
- Mix engineering – Dave Pensado, Dexter Simmons

== Charts ==
=== Weekly charts ===
2006 weekly chart performance for "Check on It"
Chart (2006)	Peak position
Australia (ARIA Digital Tracks)	15
Austria (Ö3 Austria Top 40)	10
Belgium (Ultratop 50 Flanders)	9
Belgium (Ultratop 50 Wallonia)	31
Canada (Nielsen SoundScan)	5
Canada CHR/Pop Top 30 (Radio & Records)	1
CIS Airplay (TopHit)	36
Czech Republic Airplay (ČNS IFPI)	7
European Hot 100 Singles (Billboard)	8
Finland (Suomen virallinen lista)	6
France (SNEP)	32
France Airplay (SNEP)	5
Germany (GfK)	11
Global Dance Songs (Billboard)	5
Hungary (Rádiós Top 40)	3
Ireland (IRMA)	2
Japan (Oricon)	45
Netherlands (Dutch Top 40)	5
Netherlands (Single Top 100)	3
New Zealand (Recorded Music NZ)	1
Norway (VG-lista)	2
Romania (Romanian Top 100)	3
Russia Airplay (TopHit)	33
Scottish Singles Sales (Official Charts)	3
Sweden (Sverigetopplistan)	11
Switzerland (Schweizer Hitparade)	7
Ukraine Airplay (TopHit) Maurice's Nu Soul remix	163
UK Singles (Official Charts)	3
UK Hip Hop/R&B (Official Charts)	2
US Billboard Hot 100	1
US Adult Pop Airplay (Billboard)	36
US Dance Club Songs (Billboard)	1
US Hot Latin Songs (Billboard)	44
US Hot R&B/Hip-Hop Songs (Billboard)	3
US Pop Airplay (Billboard)	1
US Pop 100 (Billboard)	1
US Rhythmic Airplay (Billboard)	1

=== Year-end charts ===
2006 year-end chart performance for "Check on It"
Chart (2006)	Position
Australia (ARIA Digital Tracks)	46
Austria (Ö3 Austria Top 40)	52
Belgium (Ultratop Flanders)	46
Brazil (Crowley)	47
CIS Airplay (TopHit)	114
European Hot 100 Singles (Billboard)	44
Germany (Media Control GfK)	63
Hungary (Rádiós Top 40)	18
Netherlands (Dutch Top 40)	51
Netherlands (Single Top 100)	51
Romania (Romanian Top 100)	13
Russia Airplay (TopHit)	103
Switzerland (Schweizer Hitparade)	45
UK Singles (OCC)	53
UK Urban (Music Week)	38
US Billboard Hot 100	10
US Dance Club Play (Billboard)	3
US Hot R&B/Hip Hop Songs (Billboard)	19
US Pop 100 (Billboard)	9
US Rhythmic Airplay (Billboard)	14

=== Decade-end charts ===
2000s decade-end chart performance for "Check on It"
Chart	Position
US Billboard Hot 100	88
US Mainstream Top 40 (Billboard)	41

== Certifications ==
Certifications and sales for "Check on It"
Region	Certification	Certified units/sales
Canada (Music Canada)	Platinum	80,000^{‡}
Canada (Music Canada) Mastertone	2× Platinum	80,000^{*}
New Zealand (RMNZ)	Platinum	30,000^{‡}
United Kingdom (BPI)	Silver	200,000^{‡}
United States (RIAA)	2× Platinum	1,438,000
United States (RIAA) Mastertone	Platinum	1,000,000^{*}
^{*} Sales figures based on certification alone.^{‡} Sales+streaming figures based on certification alone.

== Release history ==
Release dates and formats for "Check on It"
Region	Date	Version(s)	Format(s)	Label(s)	Ref.
United States	December 13, 2005	Original; remix	12-inch vinyl; digital download	Columbia; Music World	
Brazil	January 14, 2006	Original	Digital download	Sony BMG	
Germany	January 16, 2006	Original	CD	Sony BMG	
United Kingdom	January 16, 2006	Original	CD	RCA	
United States	January 31, 2006	Remix	Digital download (EP)	Columbia; Music World	
United States	February 7, 2006	Remix	Maxi CD	Columbia; Music World	
France	April 3, 2006	Original	CD	Sony BMG	
Japan	May 3, 2006	Remix	Maxi CD	Sony BMG	

== See also ==
- List of number-one singles from the 2000s (New Zealand)
- List of Hot 100 number-one singles of 2006 (U.S.)
- List of number-one dance singles of 2006 (U.S.)
