= Déjà Vu (Beyoncé song) =

2006 single by Beyoncé

Single by Beyoncé featuring Jay-Z

from the album B'Day
- Released: June 24, 2006
- Recorded: April 2006
- Studio: Sony (New York)
- Genre: Funk; hip-hop; R&B
- Length: 4:00
- Label: Columbia
- Composers: Rodney Jerkins; Beyoncé Knowles
- Lyricists: Rodney Jerkins; Delisha Thomas; Makeba; Keli Nicole Price; Shawn Carter
- Producers: Darkchild; 808-Ray; Jon Jon; Beyoncé Knowles

Beyoncé singles chronology
"Check on It" (2005)	"Déjà Vu" (2006)	"Ring the Alarm" (2006)

Jay-Z singles chronology
"Get Throwed" (2005)	"Déjà Vu" (2006)	"Show Me What You Got" (2006)

Alternative cover
- European editions cover

Music video
- "Déjà Vu" on YouTube

"Déjà Vu" is a song by American singer Beyoncé featuring American rapper Jay-Z. It was produced by Rodney "Darkchild" Jerkins, 808-Ray, Jon Jon Traxx, and Beyoncé for her second solo album, B'Day (2006). "Déjà Vu" is an R&B song, which incorporates elements of 1970s funk and soul music. Its music is largely based on live instrumentation, including bass guitar, hi-hat and horns, except the Roland TR-808 drum machine, which is a non-live instrument. The song's title and lyrics refer to a woman being constantly reminded of a past lover.

"Déjà Vu" was released as the album's lead single to US radio stations on June 24, 2006. The song received generally mixed critical reviews. Many critics noted the similarities of "Déjà Vu" with Beyoncé's own 2003 song "Crazy in Love". Critics commended the assertiveness and the sensuality with which Beyoncé sings the lyrics and compared her vocal delivery to that of Tina Turner in the late 1980s. "Déjà Vu" and its Freemasons club remix version received three nominations at the 2007 Grammy Awards. It was recognized as the Best Song of 2006 at the Music of Black Origin (MOBO) Awards.

Commercially, "Déjà Vu" peaked at number four on the US Billboard Hot 100 chart. It topped the Hot Dance Club Play chart, the Hot Dance Singles Sales chart, and the Hot R&B/Hip-Hop Songs chart. The song was certified gold by the Recording Industry Association of America (RIAA). "Déjà Vu" peaked at number one on the UK Singles Chart and reached the top ten in over fifteen countries. The song's accompanying music video was directed by Sophie Muller. About 5,000 fans petitioned online for a re-shoot of the video, complaining about, amongst other factors, the lack of theme, the wardrobe choice, and the allegedly sexual interactions between Beyoncé and Jay-Z.

== Background and production ==
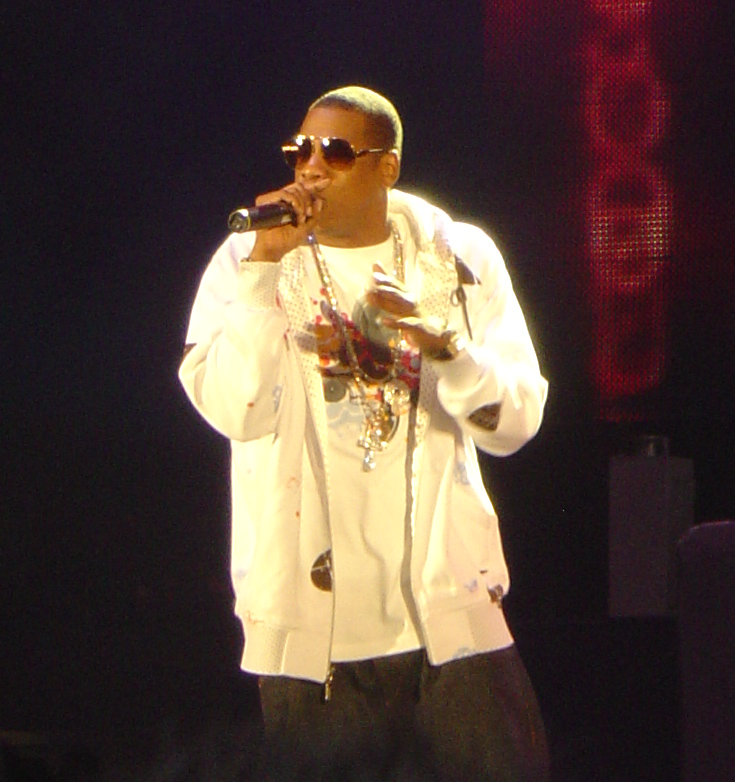
Jay-Z (pictured) joined the production at a late stage.

In 2005, American record producer Rodney "Darkchild" Jerkins and producer Jon Jon Traxx "came up with the concept of doing an old-school track, a throwback with real bass and horns", to which the song's title is partly attributed. Traxx with Jerkins, first recorded the bass sections, onto which the percussion, horns and vocals were layered. Production took place in Jerkins' New Jersey–based studio, and Sony Music Studios in New York City.

Jerkins recorded a demo version of the song with vocals by American songwriter Makeba Riddick, who is credited as co-writer. Riddick’s demo version has the same lyrics as the final song. They presented the demo to Beyoncé, who later approved of it and added melodies and handled the production alongside Jerkins and 808-Ray. According to Jerkins, Beyoncé wanted B’Day to "feel urgent" and "out of the norm".

There were no 808s on the demo of “Déjà Vu,” and she asked to add one. As a producer, live bass frequencies and 808s don’t marry well; they’re tough to align. But that’s what she wanted, so I had to go get it. I worked on the sound design to find the right 808 to match the bass, and somehow it worked. The James Brown-type intro was also her idea, which was super clever. It sets a tone in the record that we’ll never forget.

"Déjà Vu" also has lyrical contributions from songwriters Delisha Thomas and Keli Nicole Price, and Beyoncé's husband (then-boyfriend) Jay-Z. He became involved at a late stage, when Beyoncé saw him trying to sing along to a recorded version of the track, and asked him to contribute. Jay-Z recorded rap verses for the song and hence appears as a featured guest.

Concerning the production of "Déjà Vu", Beyoncé told MTV News:

When I recorded 'Deja Vu' ... I knew that even before I started working on my album, I wanted to add live instruments to all of my songs. It's such a balance [of music on the song] [...] It's still young, still new and fresh, but it has the old soul groove. The energy is incredible. It's the summer anthem, I pray. I feel it. Rodney Jerkins is incredible, Jay of course is on it, he blessed the song, I'm happy with it.

== Music and lyrics ==
"Déjà Vu" is a contemporary R&B song, performed in a moderate hip hop groove. It is also influenced by late-1970s funk music, and it contains elements of soul music as well as dance-pop music. According to the sheet music published at Musicnotes.com by EMI Music Publishing, the song is composed in the key of G minor with a time signature in common time, and a moderate groove of 106 beats per minute. Beyoncé's vocals range from the note of D♯_{4} to F_{5}. The music is largely based on live instrumentation, including a bass guitar, conga, hi-hat, and horns. A non-live instrument, the Roland TR-808 drum machine, provides the song's heavy and energetic disco beat. Spence D. of IGN Music commented that Beyoncé's vocals on the song are "silky smooth" and that her vocal range leans toward the high end, hence contrasting to the song's low-end construction. Mike Joseph of PopMatters noted that "Déjà Vu" is reminiscent of Michael Jackson's "Off the Wall" (1980).

"Déjà Vu"
"Déjà Vu" takes its music from various live instrumentation, with the bass guitar as its foundation. Several music described "Déjà Vu" as a sequel to Beyoncé's 2003 single "Crazy in Love". Beyoncé's vocals were compared to young Tina Turner's delivery.

The title refers to the déjà vu phenomenon. The lyrics to "Déjà Vu" follow the verse–pre-chorus–chorus pattern, and feature two rap verses. It is hook-laden, similar in this respect to "Crazy in Love". The lyrics detail a woman being constantly reminded of a past lover, shown in the lines, "Is it because I'm missing you that I'm having déjà vu?" As the song opens, Beyoncé introduces the bass, hi-hat and Roland TR-808 by name. The sounds of the instruments blend as they are being mentioned one after the other; the horns are only audible in the pre-chorus and hook sections, and a short section in the second rap. The bass guitar, which is the first instrument to enter, slides into the main two-bar ostinato. Following the repeated bass slides, the hi-hat and the Roland TR-808 begin playing.

After that Beyoncé mentions Jay-Z, the bass glides up for a vibrato-rich fill, giving way to the first rap. Backgrounded with a repeating groove, Beyoncé starts the first verse. The pre-chorus follows, for which the bass changes to a more melodic tone "to play something more singing", in the words of Jon Jon Webb, the bass player on the track. The melody returns to the main groove during the repeated hook. This pattern repeats and leads to the second rap verse. The third pre-chorus "comes from Jerkins' idea to have the part changes on top, with Webb's main groove on the bottom". It is followed by the main pre-chorus, then the hook is repeated four times. After that, the singing stops and the instruments fill in the space of the pre-chorus. The hi-hat and Roland TR-808 also stop; the song ends with the plucked bass and blasts of horns from the very first line of the chorus.

== Release ==
"Déjà Vu" was leaked to the internet on June 13, 2006. On June 24, 2006, it was released to radio stations in the United States, four weeks after Beyoncé informed Columbia, her record label, that B'Day was completed. Over one month later, it was released to physical formats; the track was released as a CD single on July 31, 2006, in the United States. An enhanced CD was released on September 12, containing five tracks and an additional "Déjà Vu" multimedia track. In the United Kingdom, the digital download became available on August 15, 2006. A CD maxi and a 12-inch single were released on August 21, 2006. Beyoncé's manager approached English production team Freemasons to remix "Déjà Vu" after hearing a remix they made for a song by singer Heather Headley. A club-oriented version was produced and appeared on a "Green Light" Freemasons EP, released on July 31, 2007. A maxi single, featuring the album version of the track and Freemasons club mix, was released on August 5, 2006, in European countries. The UK hits compilation album Now That's What I Call Music! 65, released in 2006, features an alternative version of the single, omitting Jay-Z's parts and running to 3 minutes and 25 seconds.

== Critical reception ==
"Déjà Vu" debuted to mixed and positive reviews among critics. Mike Joseph of the international webzine PopMatters' believed that it was "fantastic to hear Beyoncé singing her lungs out over a full-bodied groove featuring live instruments". Spence D. of IGN Music, a multimedia news and reviews website, complimented Jerkins' bass-laden groove, writing that it brought the track to perfection. Describing "Déjà Vu" as a magnificent song, Caroline Sullivan of The Guardian complimented Beyoncé and Jay-Z collaboration calling it "feverish as pre-watershed pop gets". She added that even though when Jay-Z is not physically present, he manages to bring out something formidable in Beyoncé that evokes "the young, feral Tina Turner". Bernard Zuel The Sydney Morning Herald praised the assertiveness with which Beyoncé delivers her lines and considered buying "Déjà Vu" as worthwhile.

Several other music critics have compared "Déjà Vu" to Beyoncé's 2003 single, "Crazy in Love", the lead single of her debut album. According to Gail Mitchell of Billboard magazine, the song is viewed by many as a sequel to "Crazy in Love". Jason King of the Vibe magazine deemed the song as "cloned from the DNA of the raucous 'Crazy in Love'" while Thomas Inskeep of Stylus Magazine referred to it as "'Crazy in Love' lite". Some reviewers, however, were negative to the parallels drawn between the two songs. Andy Kellman of AllMusic, an online music database, wrote that "['Déjà Vu'] "had the audacity to not be as monstrous as 'Crazy in Love'", referring to the commercial success the latter experienced in 2003. The internet-based publication Pitchfork's writer Ryan Dombal claimed that "this time [Beyoncé] out-bolds the beat".

Sasha Frere-Jones of The New Yorker deemed the lyrics as a "perplexing view of memory", while Chris Richards of The Washington Post characterized Beyoncé as a "love-dazed girlfriend" in the song. Jody Rosen of the Entertainment Weekly referred to "Déjà Vu" as an "oddly flat" choice as a lead single. Jaime Gill of Yahoo! Music regarded "Déjà Vu" as a good choice for a single but concluded that it does lack "the kind of killer chorus" to suggest that Beyoncé would take one further step "to outright global domination". On the other hand, Jon Pareles of The New York Times wrote that Jay-Z shows up "as calmly boastful as ever" in the song but he only makes Beyoncé's "sound more insecure". Kelefa Sanneh of the same publication noted that "the refrain doesn't give Beyoncé a chance really to show off" and further described the song as a "fair-to-middling single from a singer who is the opposite of desperate".

== Accolades ==
"Déjà Vu" was nominated for Best Rap/Sung Collaboration and Best R&B Song while the Freemasons club remix version was nominated for Best Remixed Recording, Non-Classical at the 2007 Grammy Awards. It was also nominated for Best Collaboration alongside Beyoncé's other song "Upgrade U" featuring Jay-Z, at the Black Entertainment Television (BET) Awards. "Déjà Vu" won Best Song at the 2006 MOBO Awards in the UK. The following year, it also received two nominations for the Best R&B/Urban Dance Track and Best Pop Dance Track at the 22nd Annual International Dance Music Awards in 2007. The writers of Rap-Up magazine put the song at number ten on their list of the ten best singles of 2006. In 2013, John Boone and Jennifer Cady of E! Online placed the song at number six on their list of ten best Beyoncé's songs. In a 2013 list of Jay-Z's 20 Biggest Billboard Hits, "Déjà Vu" was ranked at number 19. In 2022, Rolling Stone named the track Beyoncé's best song.

== Commercial performance ==
"Déjà Vu" debuted on the US Billboard Hot 100 chart at number 44 a month before its physical release. After the release of the digital and physical components, the song sold 75,000 downloads in its first week. It eventually peaked at number four on the Hot 100 chart. The track's Freemasons/M. Joshua remix topped the US Hot Dance Club Play chart, while the album version peaked at number 18 on the same component chart. "Déjà Vu" also reached the top spot of the Hot Dance Singles Sales and Hot R&B/Hip-Hop Songs charts, number nine on the Rhythmic Top 40 chart, and number 14 on the Top 40 Mainstream chart.

"Déjà Vu" reached the top 10 in eight European countries. Having sold 29,365 units on its first week, the single reached number one on the UK Singles Chart, becoming both Beyoncé and Jay-Z's second number-one single in the UK. The single reached the top five in Hungary, Ireland, Italy, Norway, and Switzerland and entered the top 10 in Belgium, Finland, and Germany. In Oceania, "Déjà Vu" peaked on the Australian Singles Chart at number 12, and on the New Zealand Singles Chart at number 15. "Déjà Vu" emerged as the 98th best-selling single in Australia in 2006.

== Music video ==
=== Background and synopsis ===
The music video for "Déjà Vu" was filmed by British director Sophie Muller in New Orleans, Louisiana on June 20–21, 2006, with parts of the video shot at the Maple Leaf Bar and the Oak Alley Plantation in Carrollton, Louisiana and Vacherie, Louisiana respectively. The footage features couture-inspired outfits, vigorous footwork and sexually themed routines. The video simultaneously premiered on July 12, 2006, on MTV's show TRL, and Overdrive, MTV's online video channel. It reached the top spot on the TRL, Yahoo!, and MTV countdowns. The "Deja Vu" video topped the UK TV airplay chart in late July 2006.

The press deemed the themes between Beyoncé and Jay-Z's interactions as sexually suggestive. A petition by fans objected to "unacceptable interactions" between Beyoncé and Jay-Z in the music video.

The video begins with showing Beyoncé against a green wall and Jay-Z sitting on a chair inside a dark room. Beyoncé and Jay-Z then start to simultaneously play imaginary instruments, mimicking the song's tune. Scenes of Beyoncé are then shown in several different rooms wearing different outfits. As the chorus begins, she is shown running around and dancing out in a large sugarcane field. At the end of the chorus, she dances in a red dress in front of a pond and in a large red dress out in front of a mansion. When Jay-Z's verse begins, the two are shown alone inside a room, Beyoncé is now barefoot and bare-legged, she dances seductively around Jay-Z, and leads to the controversial scene. Beyoncé is then shown wearing a green skirt and bedazzled bra while dancing Mbalax (a Senegalese & Gambian dance) around in sand. As the song progresses, she is shown dancing alone in a dark forest wearing a sparkling black dress as fireflies circle around her head. The song ends with Beyoncé leaning back in a pose as fireflies race away.

=== Reception ===
Reactions to the video were mixed. Sal Cinquemani of Slant Magazine commented it is "more thematic and thought provoking than the videos for 'Baby Boy' and 'Naughty Girl'", Beyoncé's songs from her debut album, Dangerously in Love. Allhiphop's Eb Haynes described the video "visually fresh" and "couture motivated". A news article published by Hindustan Times reported that a particular scene in the video is suggestive of oral sex. Natalie Y. Moore of In These Times magazine echoed the latter's commentary, writing that the video showcases Beyoncé "strutting her sexuality", and that in Jay-Z's scenes it "looks as if any minute now she'll give him fellatio". The video later appeared on a list of Yahoo! Music News' Worst Videos of All Time, which pointed to the negative fan reaction and stated, "It's probably the least horrific video listed ... but as far as Beyoncé videos go, it is ^{[sic]} a stinker."

According to an MTV News staff report, as of July 2006, more than two thousand people had signed an online petition addressed to Beyoncé's record label, Columbia, demanding a reshoot for the video. By the end of August 2006, 5000 additional fans had signed it. The petition requested the clip to be taped again because it was considered to be "an underwhelming representation of the talent and quality of previous music-video projects of Ms. Beyoncé". Included in the laundry list of offenses were "a lack of theme, dizzying editing, over-the-top wardrobe choices, and unacceptable interactions" between Beyoncé and her now-husband, Jay-Z. Beyoncé's dance moves were also called into question by the petition, qualifying them as "erratic, confusing and alarming at times". Additionally, fans complained about the sexual theme depicted in the video, describing that some scenes as "unacceptable interactions [between Beyoncé and Jay-Z]" while also complaining of a "non-existent sexual chemistry" between the two. The music video was awarded Best Video at the 2006 MOBO Awards. It also received two nominations for Sexiest Video and Best Hook-Up at the 2007 MTV Australia Video Music Awards.

== Live performances ==
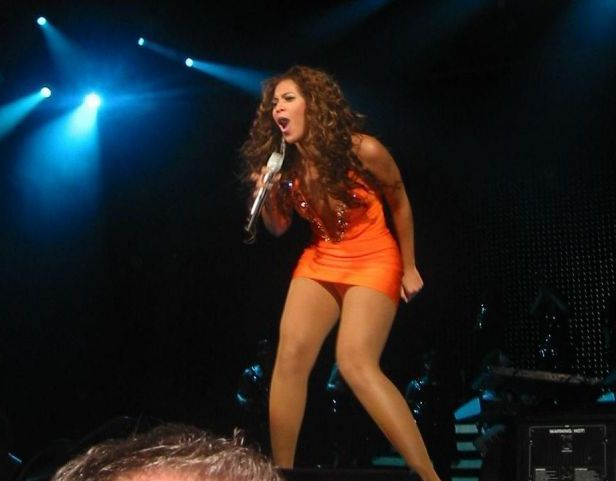
Beyoncé performing "Déjà Vu" in Stockholm on The Beyoncé Experience, 2007

"Déjà Vu" was performed by Beyoncé at the 2006 BET Awards on June 27 at the Shrine Auditorium. The show was opened with a performance of the song and Jay-Z joined Beyoncé onstage during the second half of the song. William Keck of USA Today commented that Beyoncé "sizzled in a revealing silver ensemble" as she performed the song. She also performed "Déjà Vu" at the Fashion Rocks on September 8, 2006. According to Farrah Weinstein of MTV News, Beyoncé's performance of the song was billed as a tribute to Josephine Baker, and both her stage set and outfit were in homage to the singer and dancer. The set was designed like an old cabaret club, complete with male dancers bearing saxophones, and both Beyoncé and her female dancers wore Baker's trademark mini-hula skirt embellished with fake bananas. She performed the song on the American morning news and talk show, Good Morning America during an episode which aired on September 8, 2006. Beyoncé also performed the song at The Ellen DeGeneres Show on September 9, 2006, and at The Tyra Banks Show on September 15, 2006. At the 2006 World Music Awards on November 15, 2006, Beyoncé opened the show with a performance of "Déjà Vu".

In addition to her live performances of "Déjà Vu" in awards ceremonies and televised shows, the song was included on the set list for her tours The Beyoncé Experience and I Am... World Tour. During Beyoncé's performance of "Déjà Vu" at a concert in Toronto on August 25, 2007, she had a wardrobe malfunction as her dress flew over her head and was speculated to reveal her breast. However, a spokesperson for the singer denied speculations saying, "She's wearing a flesh-tone bra! Do you really think Beyoncé would go onstage like that?". The video which was uploaded to YouTube went viral. Ann Powers of Los Angeles Times discussed about the malfunction, saying: "As a pop queen, Beyoncé is almost too perfect... [a] 'wardrobe malfunction' in Toronto garnered far more attention than was warranted partly because these mistakes contradicted her fiercely athletic style." During the revue I Am... Yours which was a part of the tour, Beyoncé performed a jazz medley of "Déjà Vu", "It Don't Mean a Thing (If It Ain't Got That Swing)" and "Bootylicious" and continued with a full version of the first song. Concert performances of "Déjà Vu" were included on her live albums The Beyoncé Experience Live (2007), I Am... Yours: An Intimate Performance at Wynn Las Vegas (2009) and I Am... World Tour (2010). Beyoncé performed Déjà Vu during her 2018 Coachella Performances on April 14 and 21, 2018, with a guest appearance by Jay Z, along with a live orchestra. It had been more than 8 years since she last performed the song. The same performance was featured on her and Jay-Z’s co-headlining On the Run II Tour the same year.

== Cover versions ==
On January 31, 2009 Jade Ewen performed the song during the Eurovision: Your Country Needs You show. During the finale of the tenth season of American Idol on May 25, 2011, the lady contestants joined together onstage to perform "Déjà Vu" along with a medley of Beyoncé's other hit singles.

== Track listings ==
- Japanese CD single
1. "Déjà Vu" (Album Version) – 3:59
- Australian, European and US CD single
1. "Déjà Vu" (Album Version) – 3:58
2. "Déjà Vu" (Freemasons Radio Mix) – 3:15
- US CD maxi single
1. "Déjà Vu" (Album Version) – 4:00
2. "Déjà Vu" (Freemasons Radio Mix) – 3:15
3. "Déjà Vu" (Freemasons Radio Mix – No Rap) – 3:15
4. "Déjà Vu" (Maurice's Nusoul Mix) – 6:01
5. "Déjà Vu" (Maurice's Nusoul Mixshow Mix) – 5:58
- German CD maxi single
1. "Déjà Vu" (Album Version) – 3:58
2. "Déjà Vu" (Freemasons Radio Mix) – 3:15
3. "Déjà Vu" (Freemasons Club Mix – No Rap) – 8:05
4. "Déjà Vu" (Maurice's Nusoul Mix) – 6:01
5. "Déjà Vu" (Maurice's Nusoul Mixshow Mix) – 5:58
6. "Déjà Vu" (Video) – 4:01
- US 12-inch vinyl
1. "Déjà Vu" (Main Version) – 4:00
2. "Déjà Vu" (Instrumental) – 4:00
3. "Déjà Vu" (Main Version) – 4:00
4. "Déjà Vu" (A Capella) – 3:52
- 12-inch vinyl (Club Mixes)
1. "Déjà Vu" (Freemasons Club Mix – No Rap) – 8:05
2. "Déjà Vu" (Freemasons Radio Mix) – 3:15
3. "Déjà Vu" (Freemasons Club Mix Instrumental) – 8:00
4. "Déjà Vu" (Freemasons Radio Mix Instrumental) – 3:15

== Credits and personnel ==
Credits are adapted from the B'Day liner notes.

- Vocals: Beyoncé Knowles, Jay-Z (raps)
- Guitar, programming, keyboards, production: Rodney Jerkins
- Bass guitar: Jon Jon
- Brass: Ronald Judge, Allen "Al Geez" Arthur, Aaron "Goody" Goode.
- Recording: Jeff Villanueva, Jim Caruana
  - Assisted by: Rob Kinelski, Jun Ishizeki
- Mix engineers: Jason Goldstein, Rodney Jerkins

== Charts ==
=== Weekly charts ===
Weekly chart performance for "Déjà Vu"
Chart (2006)	Peak position
Australia (ARIA)	12
Australian Urban (ARIA)	4
Austria (Ö3 Austria Top 40)	12
Belgium (Ultratop 50 Flanders)	8
Belgium (Ultratop 50 Wallonia)	19
Canada CHR/Top 40 (Billboard)	12
Canada Hot AC (Billboard)	41
CIS Airplay (TopHit)	43
Croatia (HRT)	8
Czech Republic Airplay (ČNS IFPI)	21
Denmark Airplay (Tracklisten)	16
European Hot 100 Singles (Billboard)	2
Finland (Suomen virallinen lista)	6
France (SNEP)	23
Germany (GfK)	9
Global Dance Songs (Billboard)	3
Greece (IFPI)	8
Hungary (Rádiós Top 40)	4
Hungary (Single Top 40)	2
Ireland (IRMA)	3
Italy (FIMI)	4
Japan (Oricon)	46
Netherlands (Dutch Top 40)	17
Netherlands (Single Top 100)	13
New Zealand (Recorded Music NZ)	15
Norway (VG-lista)	3
Romania (Romanian Top 100)	1
Scottish Singles Sales (Official Charts)	4
Slovakia Airplay (ČNS IFPI)	43
Sweden (Sverigetopplistan)	11
Switzerland (Schweizer Hitparade)	3
UK Singles (Official Charts)	1
UK Hip Hop/R&B (Official Charts)	1
US Billboard Hot 100	4
US Adult R&B Songs (Billboard)	20
US Dance Club Songs (Billboard)	1
US Hot R&B/Hip-Hop Songs (Billboard)	1
US Pop Airplay (Billboard)	14
US Pop 100 (Billboard)	10
US Rhythmic Airplay (Billboard)	9

=== Year-end charts ===
Year-end chart performance for "Déjà Vu"
Chart (2006)	Position
Australia (ARIA)	98
Australia Urban (ARIA)	34
Belgium (Ultratop 50 Flanders)	75
Brazil (Crowley)	19
CIS (TopHit)	175
European Hot 100 Singles (Billboard)	50
Germany (Media Control GfK)	80
Italy (FIMI)	49
Romania (Romanian Top 100)	64
Switzerland (Schweizer Hitparade)	55
UK Singles (OCC)	56
UK Urban (Music Week)	7
US Billboard Hot 100	75
US Dance Club Play (Billboard)	40
US Hot R&B/Hip Hop Songs (Billboard)	25
US Pop 100 (Billboard)	95

Chart (2007)	Position
Brazil (Crowley)	40

== Certifications ==
Certifications and sales for "Déjà Vu"
Region	Certification	Certified units/sales
Australia (ARIA)	Platinum	70,000^{‡}
Canada (Music Canada)	Gold	40,000^{‡}
New Zealand (RMNZ)	Gold	15,000^{‡}
United Kingdom (BPI)	Platinum	600,000^{‡}
United States (RIAA)	Platinum	1,000,000^{‡}
^{‡} Sales+streaming figures based on certification alone.

== Release history ==
Release dates and formats for "Déjà Vu"
Region	Date	Format(s)	Label(s)	Ref.
United States	June 24, 2006	Urban contemporary radio	Columbia; Music World	
United States	July 25, 2006	Digital download	Columbia; Music World	
Japan	July 26, 2006	CD	Sony BMG	
Australia	August 7, 2006	CD	Sony BMG	
United States	August 15, 2006	Digital download (2-track); maxi CD	Columbia; Music World	
Germany	August 18, 2006	CD; maxi CD	Sony BMG	
United Kingdom	August 18, 2006	Digital download (EP)	RCA	
France	August 21, 2006	CD	Sony BMG	
United Kingdom	August 21, 2006	12-inch vinyl; CD	RCA	

== See also ==
- List of number-one dance singles of 2006 (U.S.)
- List of number-one R&B singles of 2006 (U.S.)
- List of UK Singles Chart number ones of the 2000s
