= U and Dat =

2006 song by E-40 featuring T-Pain and Kandi Girl

Single by E-40 featuring T-Pain and Kandi Girl

from the album My Ghetto Report Card
- Released: May 2, 2006
- Recorded: 2005
- Genre: Crunk; dirty rap; hyphy
- Length: 3:23
- Label: BME; Sick Wid It; Warner
- Songwriters: Earl Stevens; Faheem Najm; Kandi Burruss; Alphonzo Bailey; Jonathan Smith
- Producer: Lil Jon

E-40 singles chronology
"Snap Yo Fingers" (2006)	"U and Dat" (2006)	"Candy (Drippin' Like Water)" (2006)

T-Pain singles chronology
"I'm 'n Luv (wit a Stripper)" (2005)	"U and Dat" (2006)	"Outta My System" (2007)

Kandi Girl singles chronology
"Crew Deep" (2002)	"U and Dat" (2006)	"Fly Above" (2009)

"U and Dat" is the second single from American rapper E-40's album My Ghetto Report Card. The song features American singers T-Pain and Kandi Girl, and it was produced by Lil Jon. A remix was released in early August with Juelz Santana, Snoop Dogg, and Lil' Flip. It was featured on an Amp'd Mobile commercial. Although it is considered a West Coast hip hop song, the song's beat structure incorporates typical Southern hip-hop dance claps as well as Lil Jon's signature crunk synths and whistles. The song peaked at number 13 on the Billboard Hot 100, which remains E-40's highest-charting single as lead artist to date. The track is credited to have popularized the use of T-Pain as a hook singer on hip hop tracks. The song was certified 2× Platinum by the Recording Industry Association of America (RIAA) on November 15, 2024.

== Music video ==
The music video is set in a nightclub and within a car. Most of the video includes T-Pain and E-40 scouting various women, Kandi Burruss and Ashalee Albar being just to name a few. Kandi's role in the video is to push off men around her.

Lil Jon and Katt Williams make a cameo appearance in the video.

== Chart performance ==
=== Weekly charts ===
Chart (2006)	Peak position
US Billboard Hot 100	13
US Pop Airplay (Billboard)	11
US Pop 100 (Billboard)	17
US Hot R&B/Hip-Hop Songs (Billboard)	8
US Hot Rap Songs (Billboard)	4
US Rhythmic Airplay (Billboard)	3

=== Year-end charts ===
Chart (2006)	Position
US Billboard Hot 100	52
US Hot R&B/Hip-Hop Songs (Billboard)	57
US Rhythmic (Billboard)	4

== Certifications ==
Region	Certification	Certified units/sales
New Zealand (RMNZ)	Gold	15,000^{‡}
United States (RIAA)	2× Platinum	2,000,000^{‡}
^{‡} Sales+streaming figures based on certification alone.

== Release history ==
Region	Date	Format(s)	Label(s)	Ref.
United States	July 11, 2006	Contemporary hit radio	Reprise	
