= Pullin' Me Back =

Single by Chingy featuring Tyrese

from the album Hoodstar
- Released: June 6, 2006
- Genre: Hip-hop; R&B
- Length: 3:57
- Label: Slot-A-Lot; Capitol
- Songwriters: Howard Bailey; Jermaine Mauldin; James Phillips; Brian Alexander Morgan; Jaco Pastorius
- Producer: Jermaine Dupri

Chingy singles chronology
"Don't Worry" (2006)	"Pullin' Me Back" (2006)	"Dem Jeans" (2006)

Tyrese singles chronology
"One" (2006)	"Pullin' Me Back" (2006)	"Turn Ya Out" (2007)

Music video
- "Pullin' Me Back" on YouTube

"Pullin' Me Back" is a song by American rapper Chingy, released as the first single from his third album Hoodstar. The song features R&B singer Tyrese singing the chorus with production by Jermaine Dupri. The track employs a synthesized sample of SWV's 1998 single " Rain" (which itself sampled Jaco Pastorius's "Portrait of Tracy") The video was retired on 106 & Park after being on the countdown for 65 days. "Pullin' Me Back" peaked at number one on both the Billboard Hot R&B/Hip-Hop Songs and Hot Rap Songs charts, giving Chingy his first and third number-one hits respectively. The song also peaked at number nine on the Hot 100, making it his fourth and final top ten single.

The music video features America's Next Top Model cycle 3 runner-up Yaya DaCosta.

== Chart performance ==
On the week of June 24, 2006, "Pullin' Me Back" debuted at number 23 on the Billboard Hot Rap Songs chart. The following week, it also debuted on the Hot 100 at number 86. It peaked at number one on the Hot Rap Songs chart the week of September 2, staying in that position for six consecutive weeks, and spent a total of 26 weeks on the chart. Two weeks later, the song reached number one on the Hot R&B/Hip-Hop Songs chart, staying on the chart for thirty weeks. On the Hot 100 the week of October 7, the track entered the top 10 by moving six spots from number 15 to its peak at number nine, staying on the chart for twenty weeks. This gave Chingy his fourth and final top ten single on that chart, as well as give Tyrese his second top ten hit.

== Music video ==
Directed by Erik White (who previously directed Chingy in "One Call Away"), The video follows Chingy's relationship with a model (played by America's Next Top Model cycle 3 runner-up Yaya DaCosta). The song's producer Jermaine Dupri makes a cameo in the video.

== Charts ==
=== Weekly charts ===
Chart (2006)	Peak position
Australia (ARIA)	35
Australian Urban (ARIA)	10
Canada CHR/Top 40 (Billboard)	18
Ireland (IRMA)	50
Netherlands (Dutch Top 40 Tipparade)	13
New Zealand (Recorded Music NZ)	12
Scotland Singles (OCC)	56
UK Singles (OCC)	44
UK Hip Hop/R&B (OCC)	12
US Billboard Hot 100	9
US Pop Airplay (Billboard)	16
US Hot R&B/Hip-Hop Songs (Billboard)	1
US Hot Rap Songs (Billboard)	1
US Rhythmic Airplay (Billboard)	1

=== Year-end charts ===
Chart (2006)	Position
US Billboard Hot 100	63
US Hot R&B/Hip-Hop Songs (Billboard)	15
US Rhythmic (Billboard)	15

== Certifications ==
Certifications for "Pullin' Me Back"
Region	Certification	Certified units/sales
New Zealand (RMNZ)	Platinum	30,000^{‡}
^{‡} Sales+streaming figures based on certification alone.

== Release history ==
Release dates and formats for "Pullin' Me Back"
Region	Date	Format	Label(s)	Ref.
United States	August 14, 2006	Mainstream airplay	Capitol	

== See also ==
- List of number-one R&B singles of 2006 (U.S.)
- List of Billboard number-one rap singles of the 2000s
