= Money Maker =

Single by Ludacris featuring Pharrell

from the album Release Therapy
- Released: July 17, 2006 (US radio)
- Recorded: 2006
- Genre: Dirty rap
- Length: 3:50
- Label: Disturbing tha Peace; Def Jam
- Songwriters: Christopher Bridges; Pharrell Williams
- Producer: The Neptunes

Ludacris singles chronology
"Unpredictable" (2005)	"Money Maker" (2006)	"Need a Boss" (2006)

Pharrell singles chronology
"Margarita" (2006)	"Money Maker" (2006)	"Number One" (2006)

Music video
- "Money Maker" on YouTube

"Money Maker" is a song by American rapper Ludacris featuring Pharrell Williams. It was released to the radio on July 17, 2006 as the first single from Ludacris' fifth album Release Therapy. Produced by Williams and Chad Hugo (known collectively as The Neptunes), the song is a reimagining of the 1961 Elmore James blues song "Shake Your Moneymaker". The single became Ludacris' third number-one song on the US Billboard Hot 100, while also topping the Hot R&B/Hip-Hop Songs and Hot Rap Tracks charts.

Released on August 17, 2006, the song's music video premiered on MTV's Making the Video and later managed to reach the number-one spot on BET's 106 & Park, where it remained for several days. The single had a major promotional campaign and huge airplay on radio around the U.S., Canada and other countries around the globe, while the video received strong airplay on BET, MTV, and Canada's Muchmusic. The song was performed on the 2006 MTV Video Music Awards and later won Best Rap Song at the 49th Grammy Awards.

== Critical reception ==
- About

"Money Maker" was obviously intended as a summer smash, as it more than satisfies the requirements: lame yet memorable pick-up lines ("I'm a bedroom gangsta"), disorganized, rambunctious production, and an accompanying big-budget video. Overall, it's a major setback in Ludacris' campaign to claim the Southern rap throne.

- Pitchfork

Atlanta really did need another strip-club anthem. So Ludacris and Pharrell deliver "Money Maker", roasting a Nellyesque sing-rap over steamy tropical percussion, a relentless knock that re-imagines "Can I Get a..." played with pots and pans. Fleshed out with deep, one-two bass punches and organs that trickle before bursting, it sounds faintly sinister. The hook boasts a lowering blend of Eros and economics: Luda's soliciting followed by Skateboard's stage-whispered counsel to "Shake your moneymaker / Like somebody 'bout to pay ya."

== Commercial performance ==
"Money Maker" debuted at number 96 on the Billboard Hot 100 the week of August 26, 2006. It moved seventeen spots to number 79 the week of September 2, 2006 and another eighteen spots to number 61 the week after. Two weeks later, it entered the top 40 at number 15 the week of September 23, 2006. It moved thirteen spots to number two the week after with gains in airplay and digital sales, but was kept off the top spot for four weeks by Justin Timberlake's "SexyBack". It reached number one the week of October 28, 2006 and held that spot for two weeks before losing it again to Timberlake with "My Love", remaining on the chart for a total of twenty-five weeks. The song gave Ludacris his second number-one hit as lead artist and third overall, as well as Pharrell's second number-one hit.

The song appeared at number thirty-five on the Billboard Year-End chart of 2006, and number ninety-two in 2007.

It peaked at number one on the Hot R&B/Hip-Hop Songs chart for one week, the Rhythmic chart for five weeks, and the Hot Rap Songs chart for seven weeks. On December 6, 2006, the song was certified Platinum by the Recording Industry Association of America (RIAA) for selling over 1,000,000 copies in the United States.

== Music video ==
Directed by Melina Matsoukas (who directed R&B singer Shareefa's "Need a Boss") and released on August 17, 2006, premiering on various music channels including BET, MTV, and MuchMusic, the video for "Money Maker" consists of Ludacris rapping with girls dancing around him against a basically-colored background of orange, green and black. He has a counting machine that counts how many times he gets a girl to shake her rear end (called "money maker") for him. Pharrell appears during the chorus with girls and stacks of money. There is also a Chrysler ME Four-Twelve and large speakers in the background that vibrate throughout the video, which are actually salad bowls, as Ludacris explains in "Making the Video". Allen Iverson, Shareefa, Bobby Valentino, & Lil Fate make cameo appearances. The video notably features Ludacris debuting a fade haircut on camera, having shed his trademark cornrows to mark a new image.

== Credits and personnel ==
The credits for "Money Maker" are adapted from the liner notes of Release Therapy.

Recording

- Recorded at: Chalice Recording Studios in Los Angeles, California.

Personnel

- Ludacris – vocals, songwriting
- The Neptunes – producers
- Pharrell Williams – vocals, songwriting
- Prateek dubey – recording
- Phil Tan – mixing
- Josh Houghkirk – additional engineering
- Bernie Grundman – mastering

== Charts ==
=== Weekly charts ===
Chart (2006–2007)	Peak position
Canada CHR/Pop Top 30 (Radio & Records)	7
Germany (Media Control AG)	86
US Billboard Hot 100	1
US Hot R&B/Hip-Hop Songs (Billboard)	1
US Hot Rap Songs (Billboard)	1
US Pop 100 (Billboard)	5
US Rhythmic Airplay (Billboard)	1

=== Year-end charts ===
Chart (2006)	Position
US Billboard Hot 100	35
US Hot R&B/Hip-Hop Songs (Billboard)	31
US Hot Rap Songs (Billboard)	13
US Rhythmic (Billboard)	20

Chart (2007)	Position
US Billboard Hot 100	92

== Certifications ==
Region	Certification	Certified units/sales
United States (RIAA) Digital	2× Platinum	2,000,000^{‡}
United States (RIAA) Mastertone	Platinum	1,000,000^{*}
^{*} Sales figures based on certification alone.^{‡} Sales+streaming figures based on certification alone.

== Release history ==
Release dates and formats for "Money Maker"
Region	Date	Format	Label(s)	Ref.
United States	August 1, 2006	Rhythmic contemporary radio	Def Con II	
United States	August 14, 2006	Contemporary hit radio	Disturbing tha Peace; Def Jam	

== See also ==
- List of Billboard Hot 100 number-one singles of 2006
- List of number-one R&B singles of 2006 (U.S.)
- List of Billboard number-one rap singles of the 2000s
- List of Billboard Rhythmic Top 40 number-one songs of the 2000s
