= (When You Gonna) Give It Up to Me =

2006 single by Sean Paul

Single by Sean Paul featuring Keyshia Cole

from the album Step Up (Original Soundtrack)
- Released: 6 June 2006
- Length: 4:04
- Label: Atlantic; VP
- Songwriters: Sean Henriques; Donovan Bennett; Nigel Staff
- Producer: Donovan Bennett

Sean Paul singles chronology
"Never Gonna Be the Same" (2006)	"(When You Gonna) Give It Up to Me" (2006)	"Break It Off" (2006)

Keyshia Cole singles chronology
"Love" (2006)	"(When You Gonna) Give It Up to Me" (2006)	"Last Night" (2007)

"(When You Gonna) Give It Up to Me" (known as "Give It Up to Me" in its solo version) is a song written by Jamaican rapper Sean Paul for his third album, The Trinity (2005). The single meant to be released after "Temperature" was "Breakout" but was switched to "Give It Up to Me" to promote the film Step Up (2006). It was the fourth US single to be taken from the album and the fifth UK single. The version released as a single ("(When You Gonna) Give It Up to Me") is a collaboration with Keyshia Cole and is from the Step Up film soundtrack. Despite The Trinity being re-released just before the single release, the version with Keyshia Cole does not appear on the album despite a "radio version" being added.

The solo version was released in the US on 6 June 2006 while the version with Cole was released two weeks later, on 20 June. It was later issued as a commercial single in Australia and the United Kingdom in October 2006. "(When You Gonna) Give It Up to Me" climbed to number three on the US Billboard Hot 100 chart upon its release, becoming Paul's sixth top-10 hit and Cole's first top-10 hit. Internationally, the song became a top-20 hit in Australia, the Czech Republic, Finland, Switzerland, and the Wallonia region of Belgium.

== Music video ==
The video was directed by Little X and filmed in a gym, which the director describes as "fun and exciting." Sean Paul and Keyshia Cole dance throughout the video, usually separate, and with their own dancers. Around the middle of the video, the three stars of the new dance film, Step Up, Channing Tatum, Jenna Dewan, Drew Sidora appear. Jon Cruz and Rufino Puno of Super Cr3w, from the second season of America's Best Dance Crew can be seen late in the video breakdancing.

== Track listings ==
US CD single

1. "(When You Gonna) Give It Up to Me" (featuring Keyshia Cole) [radio version]
2. "(When You Gonna) Give It Up to Me" [instrumental]

UK CD single

1. "(When You Gonna) Give It Up to Me" (featuring Keyshia Cole) [radio version]
2. "Get Busy" [Sessions at AOL version]

UK 12-inch single

1. "(When You Gonna) Give It Up to Me" (featuring Keyshia Cole) [radio version]
2. "(When You Gonna) Give It Up to Me" [instrumental]
3. "Like Glue" [video mix]
4. "Get Busy" (featuring Fatman Scoop & Crooklyn Clan) [Clap Your Hands Now remix - street club long version]

== Charts ==
=== Weekly charts ===
Chart (2006–2007)	Peak position
Australia (ARIA)	17
Australian Urban (ARIA)	5
Austria (Ö3 Austria Top 40)	30
Belgium (Ultratop 50 Flanders)	22
Belgium (Ultratop 50 Wallonia)	14
Canada (Nielsen SoundScan)	9
Canada CHR/Top 40 (Billboard)	3
CIS Airplay (TopHit)	6
Czech Republic Airplay (ČNS IFPI)	12
France (SNEP)	25
Finland (Suomen virallinen lista)	6
Germany (GfK)	26
Hungary (Rádiós Top 40)	18
Hungary (Dance Top 40)	39
Ireland (IRMA)	23
Netherlands (Tipparade)	4
Netherlands (Single Top 100)	50
Russia Airplay (TopHit)	5
Scottish Singles Sales (Official Charts)	53
Slovakia Airplay (ČNS IFPI)	32
Switzerland (Schweizer Hitparade)	5
UK Singles (Official Charts)	31
US Billboard Hot 100	3
US Hot R&B/Hip-Hop Songs (Billboard)	5
US Hot Rap Songs (Billboard)	3
US Pop 100 (Billboard)	6
US Pop Airplay (Billboard)	8
US Rhythmic Airplay (Billboard)	2

Weekly chart performance
Chart (2026)	Peak position
Austria (Ö3 Austria Top 40)	17
Czech Republic Singles Digital (ČNS IFPI)	26
France (SNEP)	96
Germany (GfK)	24
Global 200 (Billboard)	52
Greece International (IFPI)	7
Ireland (IRMA)	49
Italy (FIMI)	99
Latvia Streaming (LaIPA)	17
Lithuania (AGATA)	15
Moldova Airplay (TopHit)	11
Netherlands (Single Top 100)	41
Norway (VG-lista)	38
Panama Streaming (PRODUCE)	122
Poland (Polish Streaming Top 100)	35
Portugal (AFP)	76
Romania (Billboard)	6
Slovakia Singles Digital (ČNS IFPI)	12
Sweden (Sverigetopplistan)	42
UK Singles (Official Charts)	24
UK Indie (Official Charts)	3

=== Monthly charts ===
2026 monthly chart performance
Chart (2026)	Peak position
Moldova Airplay (TopHit)	22
Panama Streaming (PRODUCE)	139

=== Year-end charts ===
Chart (2006)	Position
Australia Urban (ARIA)	48
Belgium (Ultratop 50 Wallonia)	99
CIS Airplay (TopHit)	95
Russia Airplay (TopHit)	88
Switzerland (Schweizer Hitparade)	71
US Billboard Hot 100	37
US Hot R&B/Hip-Hop Songs (Billboard)	40
US Rhythmic (Billboard)	21

Chart (2007)	Position
CIS Airplay (TopHit)	104
Russia Airplay (TopHit)	95

=== Decade-end charts ===
Chart (2000–2009)	Position
CIS Airplay (TopHit)	200
Russia Airplay (TopHit)	171

== Certifications ==
Region	Certification	Certified units/sales
Australia (ARIA)	Gold	35,000^{‡}
Canada (Music Canada)	Gold	40,000^{‡}
Denmark (IFPI Danmark)	Gold	45,000^{‡}
New Zealand (RMNZ)	Platinum	30,000^{‡}
Spain (Promusicae)	Gold	50,000^{‡}
United Kingdom (BPI)	Platinum	600,000^{‡}
Ringtone
Canada (Music Canada)	Platinum	40,000^{*}
United States (RIAA)	Gold	500,000^{*}
Streaming
Greece (IFPI Greece)	Platinum	2,000,000^{†}
^{*} Sales figures based on certification alone.^{‡} Sales+streaming figures based on certification alone.^{†} Streaming-only figures based on certification alone.

== Release history ==
Region	Version	Date	Format(s)	Label(s)	Ref.
United States	Solo	6 June 2006	Rhythmic contemporary; contemporary hit radio	Atlantic; VP	
United States	Keyshia Cole	20 June 2006	Rhythmic contemporary; contemporary hit radio	Atlantic; VP	
Australia	Keyshia Cole	2 October 2006	CD	Atlantic; VP	
United Kingdom	Keyshia Cole	30 October 2006	12-inch vinyl; CD	Atlantic; VP	
