= Akon discography =

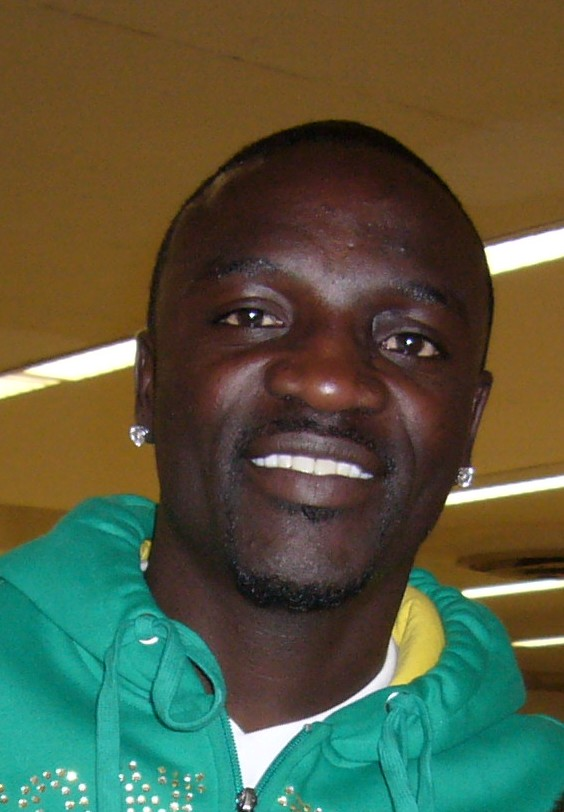
- Akon in 2008
- Studio albums: 6
- Extended plays: 3
- Singles: 38
- Music videos: 29
- Mixtapes: 4
- Promotional singles: 8

The Senegalese-American singer Akon has released six studio albums, four mixtapes, one extended play, thirty eight singles, eight promotional singles and ninety-two music videos. Born in St. Louis, Missouri, Akon lived in Senegal with his family until the age of seven, when they returned to the United States to live in New Jersey. A three-year prison sentence inspired Akon to begin recording songs in his home studio: Universal Records signed him after becoming aware of his music, and his debut album Trouble was released in June 2004. Two of its singles – "Locked Up" and "Lonely" – reached the top ten of the US Billboard Hot 100, with the latter topping numerous singles charts worldwide and being certified multi-Platinum by the Recording Industry Association of America (RIAA). Trouble also included the singles "Gunshot (Fiesta Riddim)", "Ghetto", "Belly Dancer (Bananza)" and "Pot of Gold", and was eventually certified Platinum by the RIAA and by the British Phonographic Industry in the United Kingdom, where it reached number one on the UK Albums Chart.

Akon's increasing popularity led to him making numerous guest appearances on other artists' songs: in 2005, he appeared on the singles "Baby I'm Back" by Baby Bash and "Soul Survivor" by Young Jeezy, which charted at number 19 and number four on the Billboard Hot 100 respectively. His second studio album, Konvicted, was released the following November to further commercial success, reaching number two on the Billboard 200 and the top twenty of many international albums charts, as well as subsequently being certified six-times Platinum by the RIAA. The singles "Smack That", "I Wanna Love You" and "Don't Matter" all achieved commercial success worldwide, with the former reaching number two on the Billboard Hot 100 and topping the New Zealand and UK singles charts, and the latter two becoming his first songs to top the Hot 100. Akon contributed guest vocals to a large number of commercially successful singles throughout 2007 and 2008: "The Sweet Escape" by singer Gwen Stefani, which reached number two on the Australian, New Zealand and UK singles charts as well as in the United States, "I Tried" by Bone Thugs-n-Harmony, "Bartender" by T-Pain, "Sweetest Girl (Dollar Bill)" by Wyclef Jean and "Dangerous" by Kardinal Offishall, among several others.

Akon's third album, Freedom, marked a significant stylistic transition from his first two: it eschewed the hip hop and R&B influences of Trouble and Konvicted for a more dance-pop orientated sound. "Right Now (Na Na Na)", the album's first single, reached number eight on the Hot 100, and the following two singles, "I'm So Paid" and "Beautiful" reached the top forty of the Hot 100, with the latter reaching the top 40 of many singles charts worldwide. Akon continued to frequently appear on singles by other artists following Freedom – in particular the French disc jockey David Guetta single "Sexy Bitch", which topped numerous singles charts worldwide – and his 2010 single, "Angel", reached number 56 on the Hot 100.

== Albums ==
=== Studio albums ===
List of studio albums, with selected chart positions, sales figures and certifications
Title	Album details	Peak chart positions										Sales	Certifications
Title	Album details	US	US R&B	AUS	CAN	GER	IRL	NZ	SWE	SWI	UK	Sales	Certifications
Trouble	Released: June 29, 2004 (US); Labels: UpFront, SRC, Universal; Formats: LP, CD, digital download	18	3	12	—	24	3	2	49	31	1	US: 1,600,000	RIAA: 2× Platinum; ARIA: Gold; BPI: 2× Platinum; MC: Gold; RMNZ: 2× Platinum
Konvicted	Released: November 14, 2006 (US); Labels: Konvict, UpFront, SRC, Universal Motown; Formats: LP, CD, digital download	2	2	16	4	75	10	1	41	23	16	US: 2,800,000	RIAA: 6× Platinum; ARIA: Platinum; BPI: 2× Platinum; IFPI SWI: Gold; IRMA: Platinum; MC: 2× Platinum; RMNZ: 2× Platinum
Freedom	Released: December 2, 2008 (US); Labels: Konvict, UpFront, SRC, Universal Motown; Formats: LP, CD, digital download	7	3	20	4	82	10	29	—	22	6	US: 770,000	ARIA: Gold; BPI: 2× Platinum; MC: Platinum
El Negreeto	Released: October 4, 2019 (US); Labels: Akonik, BMG; Formats: Digital download, streaming	—	—	—	—	—	—	—	—	—	—		
Akonda	Released: October 25, 2019 (US); Labels: Akonik, BMG; Formats: Digital download, streaming	—	—	—	—	—	—	—	—	—	—		
Beautiful Day	Released: April 24, 2026 (US); Label: Konvict; Formats: Digital download, streaming	—	—	—	—	—	—	—	—	—	—		
"—" denotes a recording that did not chart or was not released in that territory.

== Extended plays ==
List of EPs
Title	EP details
Ain't No Peace	Released: July 31, 2020; Labels: Konvict Kulture; Formats: Digital download, streaming
TT Freak	Released: May 23, 2023; Labels: Konvict Kulture; Formats: Digital download, streaming
Afro Freak	Released: August 25, 2023; Labels: Konvict Kulture; Formats: Digital download, streaming

== Mixtapes ==
List of mixtapes
Title	Mixtape details
Illegal Alien, Vol. 1	Released: 2005 (US); Labels: Konvict, UpFront; Formats: LP, CD, digital download
The Freedom (with DJ Noodles)	Released: November 6, 2008 (US); Labels: Konvict, UpFront, SRC; Format: LP, digital download
The Koncrete Mixtape	Released: April 14, 2012 (US); Label: Konvict; Format: Tape, digital download
Konkrete Jungle	Released: June 29, 2012 (US); Label: Konvict; Format: LP, digital download, tape

== Singles ==
=== As lead artist ===
List of singles as lead artist, with selected chart positions and certifications, showing year released and album name
Title	Year	Peak chart positions										Certifications	Album
Title	Year	US	US R&B	AUS	CAN	GER	IRL	NZ	SWE	SWI	UK	Certifications	Album
"Operations of Nature" (as A-Kon)	1996	—	—	—	—	—	—	—	—	—	—		Non-album single
"Locked Up" (featuring Styles P)	2004	8	6	33	—	15	10	—	—	19	5	RIAA: 2× Platinum; BPI: Platinum; RMNZ: 3× Platinum	Trouble
"Ghetto"	2004	92	53	—	—	—	—	—	—	—	—	RMNZ: Platinum	Trouble
"Lonely"	2005	4	4	1	—	1	1	1	2	1	1	RIAA: 4× Platinum; ARIA: 2× Platinum; BPI: 2× Platinum; BVMI: Gold; IFPI SWI: Gold; RMNZ: 3× Platinum	Trouble
"Belly Dancer (Bananza)"	2005	30	—	23	—	32	11	12	—	40	5	RIAA: Platinum; BPI: Silver; RMNZ: Platinum	Trouble
"Pot of Gold"	2005	—	—	—	—	95	33	—	—	—	77		Trouble
"Smack That" (featuring Eminem)	2006	2	34	2	1	5	1	1	3	3	1	RIAA: Diamond; ARIA: 7× Platinum; BPI: 2× Platinum; BVMI: Platinum; IFPI SWE: Platinum; MC: 8× Platinum; RMNZ: 6× Platinum	Konvicted
"I Wanna Love You" (featuring Snoop Dogg)	2006	1	3	6	3	14	2	2	17	16	3	RIAA: 6× Platinum; ARIA: 3× Platinum; BPI: Platinum; RMNZ: 3× Platinum	Konvicted
"Don't Matter"	2007	1	5	9	4	29	1	1	23	19	3	RIAA: 6× Platinum; BPI: Platinum; RMNZ: 4× Platinum	Konvicted
"Mama Africa"	2007	—	— (Note: "Mama Africa" did not enter the Hot R&B/Hip-Hop Songs chart, but peaked at number 8 on the Bubbling Under R&B/Hip-Hop Singles chart.)	—	—	—	—	—	—	—	47		Konvicted
"Sorry, Blame It on Me"	2007	7	—	27	17	—	9	2	6	46	22	RIAA: Platinum; BPI: Gold; RMNZ: Platinum	Konvicted
"Never Took the Time"	2007	—	—	—	—	—	—	—	—	—	—		Konvicted
"Wanna Be Startin' Somethin' 2008" (with Michael Jackson)	2008	81	—	8	33	63	—	4	3	—	57	ARIA: Gold	Thriller 25
"I Can't Wait" (featuring T-Pain)	2008	—	—	—	—	—	—	—	—	—	116	RMNZ: Gold	Konvicted
"Right Now (Na Na Na)"	2008	8	73	17	7	44	18	5	48	15	6	RIAA: 2× Platinum; ARIA: 4× Platinum; BPI: Platinum; RMNZ: 2× Platinum	Freedom
"I'm So Paid" (featuring Lil Wayne and Young Jeezy)	2008	31	47	—	41	—	—	—	21	—	59	RIAA: Platinum; BPI: Silver; RMNZ: Gold	Freedom
"Beautiful" (featuring Colby O'Donis and Kardinal Offishall)	2009	19	61	14	16	34	13	13	28	34	8	RIAA: 2× Platinum; ARIA: 3× Platinum; BPI: Platinum; RMNZ: 2× Platinum	Freedom
"We Don't Care"	2009	—	—	91	—	—	—	—	—	—	61		Freedom
"Give It to 'Em" (featuring Rick Ross)	2010	—	—	—	—	—	—	—	—	—	—		Non-album single
"Oh Africa" (featuring Keri Hilson)	2010	—	—	—	—	—	—	—	—	52	56		Listen Up!
"Angel"	2010	56	—	57	23	—	—	20	23	—	—	RIAA: Gold; IFPI SWE: Gold; RMNZ: Gold	Non-album single
"Hold My Hand" (with Michael Jackson)	2010	39	33	37	16	7	21	6	8	9	10	RIAA: Gold; BPI: Silver; RMNZ: Gold	Michael
"Time Is Money"	2011	—	—	—	—	—	—	—	—	—	—		Non-album single
"Chammak Challo" (with Hamsika Iyer)	2011	—	—	—	—	—	—	—	—	—	—		Ra.One
"Hurt Somebody" (featuring French Montana)	2012	—	— (Note: "Hurt Somebody" did not enter the Billboard R&B/Hip-Hop Songs chart, but peaked at number 6 on the Bubbling Under R&B/Hip-Hop Songs chart.)	—	94	—	—	—	—	—	—		The Koncrete Mixtape
"So Blue"	2013	—	—	77	—	—	—	—	—	—	—		Non-album single
"Stick Around" (with Matoma)	2015	—	—	—	—	—	—	—	—	—	—		Hakuna Matoma
"Want Some" (featuring DJ Chose)	2015	—	— (Note: "Want Some" did not enter the Hot R&B/Hip-Hop Songs chart, but peaked at number 17 on the R&B/Hip-Hop Digital Songs chart.)	—	—	—	—	—	—	—	—		Non-album singles
"Hypnotized"	2016	—	—	—	—	—	—	—	—	—	—		Non-album singles
"Good Girls Lie"	2016	—	— (Note: "Good Girls Lie" did not enter the Hot R&B/Hip-Hop Songs chart, but peaked at number 25 on the R&B Digital Songs chart.)	—	—	—	—	—	—	—	—		Non-album singles
"Get Money" (featuring Anuel AA)	2019	—	—	—	—	—	—	—	—	—	—		Non-album singles
"Low Key"	2019	—	—	—	—	—	—	—	—	—	—		Akonda
"Wakonda"	2019	—	—	—	—	—	—	—	—	—	—		Akonda
"Benjamin"	2019	—	—	—	—	—	—	—	—	—	—		Non-album single
"Cómo No" (featuring Becky G)	2019	—	—	—	—	—	—	—	—	—	—		El Negreeto
"Can't Say No"	2019	—	—	—	—	—	—	—	—	—	—		Non-album single
"Te Quiero Amar" (featuring Pitbull)	2020	—	—	—	—	—	—	—	—	—	—		El Negreeto
"Sólo Tú" (featuring Farruko)	2020	—	—	—	—	—	—	—	—	—	—		El Negreeto
"Enjoy That"	2022	—	—	—	—	—	—	—	—	—	—		Non-album single
"Akon's Beautiful Day"	2024	— (Note: "Akon's Beautiful Day" did not enter the Billboard Hot 100, but peaked at number 18 on the Bubbling Under Hot 100 Singles chart.)	—	—	—	—	—	—	—	—	—		Beautiful Day
"Never Really Mattered" (with Simien)	2025	—	—	—	—	—	—	—	—	—	—		Beautiful Day
"Drunk Right Now (Na Na Na)" (with Josh Ross)	2025	—	—	—	67	—	—	—	—	—	—		Later Tonight
"Ghetto Livin" (with Sheesh)	2025	—	—	—	—	—	—	—	—	—	—		Non-album single
"Ringtone"	2026	—	—	—	—	—	—	—	—	—	—		Beautiful Day
"—" denotes a recording that did not chart or was not released in that territory.

=== As featured artist ===
List of singles as featured artist, with selected chart positions and certifications, showing year released and album name
Title	Year	Peak chart positions										Certifications	Album
Title	Year	US	US R&B	AUS	CAN	FRA	GER	IRL	NZ	SWI	UK	Certifications	Album
"Find Us" (The Beatnuts featuring Akon)	2004	—	—	—	—	—	—	—	—	—	92		Milk Me
"Keep on Calling" (P-Money featuring Akon)	2005	—	—	—	—	—	—	—	23	—	—	RMNZ: Platinum	Magic City
"Baby I'm Back" (Baby Bash featuring Akon)	2005	19	52	—	—	—	—	—	—	—	—	RIAA: Gold; RMNZ: Platinum	Super Saucy
"Soul Survivor" (Young Jeezy featuring Akon)	2005	4	1	—	—	—	74	32	—	—	16	RIAA: Platinum; RMNZ: Gold	Let's Get It: Thug Motivation 101
"Moonshine" (Savage featuring Akon)	2005	—	—	9	—	—	—	—	1	—	—	ARIA: Gold; RMNZ: 3× Platinum	Moonshine
"I Am Not My Hair" (Konvict Remix) (India.Arie featuring Akon)	2006	—	—	—	—	—	—	—	—	—	—		Non-album single
"Girls" (Beenie Man featuring Akon)	2006	—	—	—	—	—	—	—	38	—	47		Undisputed
"Snitch" (Obie Trice featuring Akon)	2006	—	— (Note: "Snitch" did not enter the Hot R&B/Hip-Hop Songs chart, but peaked at number 11 on the Bubbling Under R&B/Hip-Hop Singles chart.)	39	—	58	—	44	—	—	44		Second Round's on Me
"Can You Believe It" (Styles P featuring Akon)	2006	— (Note: "Can You Believe It" did not enter the Billboard Hot 100, but peaked at number 8 on the Bubbling Under Hot 100 Singles chart.)	31	—	—	—	—	—	—	—	—		Time Is Money
"The Sweet Escape" (Gwen Stefani featuring Akon)	2006	2	—	2	2	4	6	4	1	10	2	ARIA: 2× Platinum; BPI: 3× Platinum; BVMI: Platinum; RIAA: 5× Platinum; RMNZ: 5× Platinum	The Sweet Escape
"Survivor" (40 Cal. featuring Akon)	2007	—	—	—	—	—	—	—	—	—	—		Broken Safety
"I Tried" (Bone Thugs-n-Harmony featuring Akon)	2007	6	45	—	45	—	—	—	4	—	69	RIAA: Platinum; RMNZ: Platinum	Strength & Loyalty
"We Takin' Over" (DJ Khaled featuring Akon, T.I., Rick Ross, Fat Joe, Birdman and Lil Wayne)	2007	28	26	—	92	—	—	—	—	—	—	RIAA: Platinum; MC: Gold	We the Best
"The Way She Moves" (Zion featuring Akon)	2007	— (Note: "The Way She Moves" did not enter the Billboard Hot 100, but peaked at number 21 on the Bubbling Under Hot 100 Singles chart.)	—	—	—	—	—	—	—	—	—		The Perfect Melody
"Bartender" (T-Pain featuring Akon)	2007	5	9	—	46	—	—	—	1	—	104	RIAA: 4× Platinum; BPI: Silver; RMNZ: 4× Platinum	Epiphany
"9mm" (David Banner featuring Akon, Lil Wayne and Snoop Dogg)	2007	— (Note: "9mm" did not enter the Billboard Hot 100, but peaked at number 15 on the Bubbling Under Hot 100 Singles chart.)	66	—	—	—	—	—	—	—	—		The Greatest Story Ever Told
"Get Buck in Here" (DJ Felli Fel featuring Diddy, Akon, Ludacris and Lil Jon)	2007	41	72	—	58	—	—	—	—	—	—	RIAA: Gold	Non-album single
"Sweetest Girl (Dollar Bill)" (Wyclef Jean featuring Akon, Lil Wayne and Niia)	2007	12	— (Note: "Sweetest Girl (Dollar Bill)" did not enter the Hot R&B/Hip-Hop Songs chart, but peaked at number 10 on the Bubbling Under R&B/Hip-Hop Singles chart.)	28	14	—	30	—	8	51	66	RIAA: Platinum; MC: Gold; RMNZ: 2× Platinum	Carnival Vol. II: Memoirs of an Immigrant
"Hypnotized" (Plies featuring Akon)	2007	14	22	—	77	—	—	—	4	—	66	RIAA: Gold; RMNZ: 2× Platinum	The Real Testament
"Certified" (Glasses Malone featuring Akon)	2007	—	85	—	—	—	—	—	—	—	—		Beach Cruiser
"I'll Still Kill" (50 Cent featuring Akon)	2007	95	52	99	—	—	—	—	14	—	—	RMNZ: Gold	Curtis
"Graveyard Shift" (Kardinal Offishall featuring Akon)	2007	—	—	—	—	—	—	—	—	—	—		Non-album single
"What You Got" (Colby O'Donis featuring Akon)	2008	14	84	—	29	—	—	—	—	—	—		Colby O
"On My Trail" (L.A. featuring Akon)	2008	—	—	—	—	—	—	—	—	—	—		Worldwide
"Dangerous" (Kardinal Offishall featuring Akon)	2008	5	50	42	2	8	18	40	42	44	16	BPI: Gold; MC: 4× Platinum; RIAA: 3× Platinum; RMNZ: Platinum	Not 4 Sale
"Frozen" (Tami Chynn featuring Akon)	2008	—	—	—	—	—	—	—	—	—	—		Non-album single
"Get Low wit It" (Romeo featuring Akon)	2008	—	—	—	—	—	—	—	—	—	—		Get Low LP
"That's Right" (Three 6 Mafia featuring Akon)	2008	—	97	—	—	—	—	—	—	—	—		Last 2 Walk
"Out Here Grindin" (DJ Khaled featuring Akon, Rick Ross, Young Jeezy, Lil Boosie, Trick Daddy, Ace Hood and Plies)	2008	38	32	—	71	—	—	—	—	—	—	RIAA: Gold; MC: Gold	We Global
"Wake It Up" (E-40 featuring Akon)	2008	— (Note: "Wake It Up" did not enter the Billboard Hot 100, but peaked at number 17 on the Bubbling Under Hot 100 Singles chart.)	84	—	—	—	—	—	—	—	—		The Ball Street Journal
"Body on Me" (Nelly featuring Akon and Ashanti)	2008	42	69	32	57	—	—	12	19	—	17	RMNZ: 2× Platinum	Brass Knuckles
"Dream Big" (Crooked I featuring Akon)	2008	—	—	—	—	—	—	—	—	—	—		Non-album single
"What's Love" (Shaggy featuring Akon)	2008	—	—	—	—	—	52	—	—	—	—		Intoxication
"Silver & Gold" (Sway featuring Akon)	2009	—	—	—	—	—	—	—	—	—	61		The Signature LP
"Dreamgirl" (Tay Dizm featuring Akon)	2009	— (Note: "Dreamgirl" did not enter the Billboard Hot 100, but peaked at number 18 on the Bubbling Under Hot 100 Singles chart.)	—	—	—	—	—	—	—	—	—		Welcome to the New World
"Day Dreaming" (DJ Drama featuring Akon, Snoop Dogg and T.I.)	2009	—	88	—	—	—	—	—	33	—	—		Gangsta Grillz: The Album (Vol. 2)
"One" (Fat Joe featuring Akon)	2009	—	74	—	—	—	—	—	—	—	—		Jealous Ones Still Envy 2 (J.O.S.E. 2)
"Just Go" (Lionel Richie featuring Akon)	2009	—	—	—	—	—	—	—	—	75	52		Just Go
"Stuck with Each Other" (Shontelle featuring Akon)	2009	—	—	—	—	—	—	46	—	—	23		Shontelligence
"Blood Into Gold" (Peter Buffett featuring Akon)	2009	—	—	—	—	—	—	—	—	—	—		Running Blind
"All Up 2 You" (Aventura featuring Akon and Wisin & Yandel)	2009	— (Note: "All Up 2 You" did not enter the Billboard Hot 100, but peaked at number 8 on the Bubbling Under Hot 100 Singles chart.)	—	—	—	—	—	—	—	—	—		The Last
"Overtime" (Ace Hood featuring Akon and T-Pain)	2009	— (Note: "Overtime" did not enter the Billboard Hot 100, but peaked at number 19 on the Bubbling Under Hot 100 Singles chart.)	70	—	—	—	—	—	—	—	—		Ruthless
"Yalli Naseeni" (Melissa featuring Akon)	2009	—	—	—	—	—	—	—	—	—	—		Non-album single
"On Top" (Twista featuring Akon)	2009	— (Note: "On Top" did not enter the Billboard Hot 100, but peaked at number 1 on the Bubbling Under Hot 100 Singles chart.)	—	—	—	—	—	—	—	—	—		Category F5
"Sexy Bitch" (David Guetta featuring Akon)	2009	5	—	1	1	2	1	2	1	2	1	RIAA: 3× Platinum; ARIA: 5× Platinum; BPI: 3× Platinum; BVMI: Platinum; IFPI SWI: 4× Platinum; MC: Gold; RMNZ: 3× Platinum; SNEP: Diamond	One Love
"Let's Get Crazy" (Cassie featuring Akon)	2009	—	—	—	—	—	—	—	—	—	—		Non-album singles
"Le sang des innocents" (Pamela Lajoie featuring Akon)	2009	—	—	—	—	—	—	—	—	—	—		Non-album singles
"Shut It Down" (Pitbull featuring Akon)	2009	42	—	—	23	—	30	30	25	41	33	ARIA: Gold; MC: Platinum	Rebelution
"Change Me" (Keri Hilson featuring Akon)	2009	—	—	—	—	—	—	—	—	—	—		In a Perfect World...
"Hold on Tight" (Jay-J featuring Qwes, Akon and Tariq L)	2009	—	—	—	—	—	—	—	—	—	—		Non-album singles
"Celebration" (Madonna featuring Akon)	2009	—	—	—	—	—	—	—	—	—	—		Non-album singles
"Available" (Flo Rida featuring Akon)	2009	—	—	—	89	—	—	—	—	—	—		R.O.O.T.S.
"Angel Eyes" (Play-N-Skillz featuring Akon)	2009	—	—	—	—	—	—	—	—	—	—		Non-album singles
"We Are the World 25 for Haiti" (with Artists for Haiti)	2010	2	—	18	7	—	—	9	8	—	50		Non-album singles
"Strawberry Letter 23" (Quincy Jones featuring Akon)	2010	—	— (Note: "Strawberry Letter 23" did not enter the Hot R&B/Hip-Hop Songs chart, but peaked at number 7 on the Bubbling Under R&B/Hip-Hop Singles chart.)	—	—	—	—	—	—	—	—		Q: Soul Bossa Nostra
"Body Bounce" (Kardinal Offishall featuring Akon)	2010	—	—	—	16	—	—	—	—	—	—	MC: Gold	Mr. International
"Push Push" (Kat DeLuna featuring Akon)	2010	—	—	—	84	9	—	—	—	—	—		Inside Out
"Better Than Her" (Matisse featuring Akon)	2010	—	—	—	—	—	—	—	—	—	—		Non-album single
"Move That Body" (Nelly featuring T-Pain and Akon)	2010	54	—	29	—	—	—	—	—	—	71		5.0
"Kush" (Dr. Dre featuring Snoop Dogg and Akon)	2010	34	43	81	33	46	—	—	—	59	57	RMNZ: Gold	Non-album single
"Dirty Situation" (Mohombi featuring Akon)	2010	—	—	—	—	28	—	—	—	—	—		MoveMeant
"I Just Had Sex" (The Lonely Island featuring Akon)	2010	30	—	10	13	—	—	44	30	—	68	RIAA: Platinum; ARIA: Platinum; BPI: Silver; RMNZ: Gold	Turtleneck & Chain
"Who Dat Girl" (Flo Rida featuring Akon)	2011	29	65	10	16	—	—	—	—	—	64	ARIA: Platinum; MC: Platinum	Only One Flo (Part 1)
"Club Certified" (Kylian Mash featuring Akon and Glasses Malone)	2011	—	—	—	—	—	—	—	—	—	—		Non-album singles
"Boomerang" (DJ Felli Fel featuring Akon, Pitbull and Jermaine Dupri)	2011	—	—	—	—	—	—	—	—	—	—		Non-album singles
"Lock Down" (Ya Boy featuring Akon)	2011	—	—	—	—	—	—	—	—	—	—		Non-album singles
"Famous" (Nick Cannon featuring Akon)	2011	—	—	—	—	—	—	—	—	—	—		White People Party Music
"Freaky" (Mook featuring Akon, Jadakiss and Shella)	2011	—	—	—	—	—	—	—	—	—	—		Ruff Ryders: Past, Present, Future
"Last Man Standing" (Asher Roth featuring Akon)	2011	—	—	—	—	—	—	—	—	—	—		Madden NFL 12 soundtrack
"I'm Day Dreaming" (Redd featuring Akon and Snoop Dogg)	2011	—	—	—	—	—	53	—	—	29	71		Non-album single
"Chop My Money" (P-Square featuring Akon and May D)	2012	—	—	—	—	—	—	—	—	—	—		The Invasion
"Like Money" (Wonder Girls featuring Akon)	2012	—	—	—	—	—	—	—	—	—	—		Wonder Best
"Play Hard" (David Guetta featuring Ne-Yo and Akon)	2013	64	—	16	34	7	8	8	11	3	6	ARIA: Platinum; BPI: 2× Platinum; BVMI: Platinum; IFPI SWI: Gold; RMNZ: Platinum; SNEP: Gold	Nothing but the Beat 2.0
"Paradise" (Just Ivy featuring Akon)	2013	—	—	—	—	—	—	—	—	—	—		Non-album single
"One In the Chamber" (Salaam Remi featuring Akon)	2013	—	—	—	—	—	—	—	—	—	—		ONE: In the Chamber
"No One Can Replace You" (Purple Aura and Chris Willis featuring Akon)	2013	—	—	—	—	—	—	—	—	—	—		Non-album singles
"Electricity & Drums (Bad Boy)" (Audé featuring Akon and Luciana)	2013	—	—	—	—	—	—	—	—	—	—		Non-album singles
"Dream Warriors" (Harlee featuring Akon)	2014	—	—	—	—	—	—	—	—	—	—		Non-album singles
"Feeling the Nigga" (Remix) (D'banj featuring Akon)	2015	—	—	—	—	—	—	—	—	—	—		An Epic Journey
"Interstellar" (Gue Pequeno featuring Akon)	2015	—	—	—	—	—	—	—	—	—	—	FIMI: Gold	Vero
"Holiday" (DJ Antoine featuring Akon)	2015	—	—	—	—	120	18	—	—	8	—	BVMI: Gold	Provocateur
"Act Like You Know" (E.G.O. featuring Akon)	2015	—	—	—	—	—	—	—	—	—	—		Maximum Pressure
"Cucumber" (B-Red featuring Akon)	2015	—	—	—	—	—	—	—	—	—	—		All the Way Up
"Frosh" (D'banj featuring Akon)	2015	—	—	—	—	—	—	—	—	—	—		An Epic Journey
"Heatwave" (Robin Schulz featuring Akon)	2016	—	—	—	—	—	30	—	—	—	—	BVMI: Gold; MC: Gold	Sugar
"I Am Somebody" (DJ Greg Street featuring Akon, B.o.B and Big K.R.I.T.)	2016	—	—	—	—	—	—	—	—	—	—		Non-album singles
"Oh La La La" (Carolina Marquez featuring Akon and J Rand)	2016	—	—	—	—	—	—	—	—	—	—		Non-album singles
"Tell Me We're Ok" (DJ Hardwerk featuring Akon)	2016	—	—	—	—	—	—	—	—	—	—		Non-album singles
"YES" (Sam Feldt featuring Akon)	2017	—	—	—	—	—	—	—	—	—	—		Sunrise
"Til the Sun Rise Up" (Bob Sinclar featuring Akon)	2017	—	—	—	—	139	—	—	—	—	—		Non-album singles
"Solito (Lonely)" (Messiah featuring Nicky Jam and Akon)	2019	—	—	—	—	—	—	—	—	—	—		Non-album singles
"Kowope" (Skales featuring Akon)	2020	—	—	—	—	—	—	—	—	—	—		Non-album singles
"Good Girl" (Don Omar featuring Akon)	2022	—	—	—	—	—	—	—	—	—	—		Forever King
"She Knows" (Dimitri Vegas & Like Mike featuring Akon, David Guetta, & Afro Bros)	2023	—	—	—	—	—	—	—	—	—	—		Rewind + Repeat
"Locked Up" (Steve Aoki and Trinix featuring Akon)	2023	—	—	—	—	—	—	—	—	—	—		Hiroquest 2: Double Helix
"Boom Body" (Shaggy featuring Aidonia and Akon)	2025	—	—	—	—	—	—	—	—	—	—		Lottery
"—" denotes a recording that did not chart or was not released in that territory.

=== Promotional singles ===
List of promotional singles, with selected chart positions, showing year released and album name
Title	Year	Peak chart positions		Certifications	Album
Title	Year	US	CAN	Certifications	Album
"Holla Holla" (featuring T-Pain)	2008	— (Note: "Holla Holla" did not enter the Billboard Hot 100, but peaked at number 19 on the Bubbling Under Hot 100 Singles chart.)	—		Freedom
"Troublemaker" (featuring Sweet Rush)	2008	97	65		Freedom
"Be with You"	2009	—	—	RMNZ: Gold	Freedom
"Don't Dull" (Remix) (Wizkid featuring Akon)	2011	—	—		Non-album singles
"Dami Duro" (Remix) (Davido featuring Akon)	2012	—	—		Non-album singles
"The Biggest Mistake" (Remix) (The Secret State featuring Akon and B.o.B)	2013	—	—		Non-album singles
"Roll It" (Remix) (Wizkid featuring Akon and Banky W.)	2014	—	—		Non-album singles
"Better" (featuring Niko the Kid)	2015	—	—		Non-album singles
"Hustle" (May D featuring Akon and Davido)	2016	—	—		Non-album singles
"—" denotes a recording that did not chart or was not released in that territory.

== Other charted and certified songs ==
List of songs, with selected chart positions, showing year released and album name
Title	Year	Peak chart positions								Certifications	Album
Title	Year	US	US R&B	AUS	CAN	FRA	GER	NOR	UK	Certifications	Album
"Don't Let Up"	2004	—	—	—	—	—	—	—	—	RMNZ: Gold	Trouble
"Slow Wind" (Remix) (R. Kelly featuring Sean Paul and Akon)	2005	—	91	—	—	—	—	—	—		Remix City, Volume 1
"Gangsta Bop"	2006	—	—	—	—	—	—	—	—	RMNZ: Platinum	Konvicted
"Boss' Life" (Snoop Dogg featuring Akon)	2007	—	— (Note: "Boss' Life" did not enter the Hot R&B/Hip-Hop Songs chart, but peaked at number three on the Bubbling Under R&B/Hip-Hop Singles chart.)	—	—	—	—	—	—		Tha Blue Carpet Treatment
"Keep You Much Longer"	2008	— (Note: "Keep You Much Longer" did not enter the Billboard Hot 100, but peaked at number 23 on the Bubbling Under Hot 100 Singles chart.)	—	—	—	—	—	—	—		Freedom
"Like I Never Left" (Whitney Houston featuring Akon)	2009	—	— (Note: "Like I Never Left" did not enter the Hot R&B/Hip-Hop Songs chart, but peaked at number 23 on the Bubbling Under R&B/Hip-Hop Singles chart.)	—	—	—	—	—	—		I Look to You
"Crank It Up" (David Guetta featuring Akon)	2011	—	—	49	50	64	43	—	96		Nothing but the Beat
"Everybody Fucks" (Pitbull featuring Akon and David Rush)	2012	—	—	—	—	—	—	19	—		Global Warming
"Let It Go" (Wiz Khalifa featuring Akon)	2012	87	25	—	91	—	—	—	—		O.N.I.F.C.
"Came to Do" (Chris Brown featuring Akon)	2014	—	52	—	—	174	—	—	105	RMNZ: Gold	X
"Unsterblichkeit" (Bushido featuring Akon)	2018	—	—	—	—	—	95	—	—		Mythos
"—" denotes a recording that did not chart or was not released in that territory.

== Guest appearances ==
List of non-single guest appearances, with other performing artists, showing year released and album name
Title	Year	Other artist(s)	Album
"Fu-Gee-La" (Sly & Robbie Mix)	1996	Fugees, Sly & Robbie	The Score
"Block to Block"	2001	Rasheeda	Dirty South
"Make It Hot"	2001	Rasheeda	Dirty South
"Lil' Buddy"	2001	Que'Bo Gold, Polo, Rasheeda	Red Clay
"This Boy Here"	2001	Que'Bo Gold	Red Clay
"Sit Down Somewhere"	2001	Que'Bo Gold, ReRe	Red Clay
"This Boy Here"	2001	Don Yute	Adrenalin
"Watcha Gonna Do?"	2005	Brian McKnight, Juvenile, Skip	Gemini
"No Way Jose"	2005	Baby Bash	Super Saucy
"Rebel Musik"	2005	Monsieur R	Politikment Incorrekt
"So Fly"	2005	none	The Longest Yard soundtrack
"Stay Down"	2005	Flashy	Vol. 4: The Redemption
"Mr. Martin"	2005	Pras	Win Lose or Draw
"Miss Melody"	2005	Miri Ben-Ari	The Hip-Hop Violinist
"U Got Me"	2005	T-Pain	Rappa Ternt Sanga
"Ur Not the Same"	2005	T-Pain	Rappa Ternt Sanga
"Presidential" (Tha Remix)	2005	YoungBloodZ	Ev'rybody Know Me
"Hustler's Story"	2005	The Notorious B.I.G., Scarface, Big Gee	Duets: The Final Chapter
"Gun in Hand"	2006	Booba	Ouest Side
"Ghetto Soldier"	2006	Papoose	The 1.5 Million Dollar Man
"Cross That Line"	2006	Rick Ross	Port of Miami
"Sweet Sweet Sweet" (06 Akon Mix)	2006	Dreams Come True	Sonic the Hedgehog (video game soundtrack)
"Ghetto Story Chapter 3"	2006	Cham	Ghetto Story
"Boss' Life"	2006	Snoop Dogg	Tha Blue Carpet Treatment
"Keep on Callin'"	2007	Joell Ortiz	The Brick: Bodega Chronicles
"Never Forget Me"	2007	Bone Thugs-n-Harmony	Strength & Loyalty
"Bring It On"	2007	Daddy Yankee	El Cartel: The Big Boss
"Change Up"	2007	Fabolous	From Nothin' to Somethin'
"Got My Eyes on You"	2007	Styles P	Super Gangster (Extraordinary Gentleman)
"Some More"	2008	Keith Sweat	Just Me
"Put It on My Tab"	2008	New Kids on the Block	The Block
"Come on In"	2008	Sean Garrett, Plies	Turbo 919
"It Ain't Me"	2008	T-Pain, T.I.	Three Ringz
"Change"	2008	T-Pain, Diddy, Mary J. Blige	Three Ringz
"Arab Money" (Remix)	2008	Busta Rhymes, Lil Wayne, Diddy, T-Pain, Ron Browz, Swizz Beatz	none
"Hard as Hell"	2009	UGK	UGK 4 Life
"Don't Believe Em"	2009	Busta Rhymes, T.I.	Back on My B.S.
"Be with You"	2009	Will Pan	007
"Makin' Me Wanna"	2009	R. Kelly	The "Demo" Tape
"Like I Never Left"	2009	Whitney Houston	I Look to You
"Click Clack"	2009	Mack 10, Red Café	Soft White
"Ben" (Konvict Remix)	2009	Michael Jackson	Michael Jackson: The Remix Suite
"Ella Me Llama" (Remix)	2009	Wisin & Yandel	La Revolución: Evolution
"Street Riders"	2010	Game, Nas	Brake Lights
"One Day at a Time"	2010	Enrique Iglesias	Euphoria
"Celebrity"	2010	Lloyd Banks	H.F.M. 2 (The Hunger for More 2)
"Magnetic"	2010	Audio	none
"Lunatic"	2010	Booba	Lunatic
"MP3"	2011	K. Michelle	Signed, Sealed, Delivered
"Mr. Right Now"	2011	Pitbull, DJ Frank E	Planet Pit
"My Life"	2011	DJ Khaled, B.o.B	We the Best Forever
"Crank It Up"	2011	David Guetta	Nothing but the Beat
"Chammak Challo"	2011	Hamsika Iyer	Ra.One soundtrack
"Criminal"	2011	Vishal Dadlani, Shruti Pathak	Ra.One soundtrack
"Lock Down"	2011	DJ Drama, Ya Boy	Third Power
"Keep It 100"	2012	Verse Simmonds	Sex, Love & Hip-Hop
"Crazy Bitch"	2012	Rye Rye	Go! Pop! Bang!
"That's All I Know"	2012	Beanie Sigel	This Time
"Everybody Fucks"	2012	Pitbull, David Rush	Global Warming
"Let It Go"	2012	Wiz Khalifa	O.N.I.F.C.
"Wonderful Life"	2012	T.I.	Trouble Man: Heavy Is the Head
"Tired of Running"	2013	Snoop Lion	Reincarnated
"Rise Up"	2013	Mavado, Rick Ross	none
"Around My Way"	2013	Young Cash	Win or Die
"Recognize"	2013	Gucci Mane, Young Scooter	Diary of a Trap God
"Never Surrender"	2013	DJ Khaled, Anthony Hamilton, Jadakiss, John Legend, Meek Mill, Scarface	Suffering from Success
"Do It for the Hood 2"	2014	Red Cafe, Planet VI, Maino	American Psycho II
"Welcome to the Life"	2014	Tamer Hosny	180
"Been Getting Money"	2014	Jeezy	Seen It All: The Autobiography
"Came to Do"	2014	Chris Brown	X
"For You"	2014	Wizkid	Ayo
"Live by the Gun"	2015	R. City	What Dreams Are Made Of
"Comfortable" (Remix)	2015	K Camp, 50 Cent	You Welcome
"Y.O. (Youth Offenders)"	2015	Jadakiss	Top 5 Dead or Alive
"Rewind"	2015	Kid Ink	Summer in the Winter
"My Conclusion"	2015	Buju Banton, Stephen Marley	none
"Left 2 Right"	2015	Xav	none
"Killaz & Drug Dillaz"	2015	Solo Lucci	none
"Can't Stop"	2015	OG Boo Dirty	none
"Hustler's Ambition"	2015	Monica	Code Red
"No Matter What"	2015	N&H	none
"Keep Up"	2016	Don Yute, Spragga Benz	none
"Rhythm of the Drum"	2016	Ty Dolla Sign	none
"Hustlers Ambition" (Remix)	2016	Monica, Jeezy	Code Red
"Song Daan"	2016	Youssou N'Dour	#Senegaal Rek
"Conquer the World"	2016	Youssou N'Dour	#Senegaal Rek
"Picky" (Remix)	2016	Joey Montana, Mohombi	none
"Chillin"	2016	Davido, Runtown	none
"Please Don't Go Away"	2016	Mayunga	none
"Ice Game"	2016	Young Scooter	Street Lottery 3
"SOS"	2016	Sosay Adonis	Bottom of the 5th
"At Night"	2016	Flo Rida, Liz Elaias	none
"Had It Hard"	2016	DJ Funky, DJ Buu, Waka Flocka Flame	For Smokers Only
"Should I Move"	2016	The Lonely Island	Popstar: Never Stop Never Stopping
"Conquer the World"	2016	Youssou N'Dour	Africa Rekk
"Fallen Stars"	2016	dB Fre$h, Devan Davone	none
"Celebration"	2016	Young Greatness	none
"Give It Back"	2016	Chocolate Droppa	Kevin Hart: What Now? (The Mixtape Presents Chocolate Droppa)
"Make The Fucking World Bounce"	2016	Da Illest, will.i.am	none
"No Time"	2016	Money Man	none
"Hustle"	2016	May D, Davido	none
"Moon Walk"	2016	Gucci Mane, Chris Brown	none
"Money Made Me Do It"	2016	King B, OG Boo Dirty	none
"Bedroom"	2016	P Square	none
"End It All" (Remix)	2016	Xav	none
"Holy Ghost Fire"	2017	Flex	none
"11:11 (Part 2)"	2017	Huey Mack	none
"No Wahala"	2017	Demarco, Runtown	none
"Nobody"	2017	OG Boo Dirty	none
"Relax"	2017	Fergie, A$AP Rocky	none
"City Life"	2017	Isaac James, David Guetta	none
"I'm on It"	2017	Roy Demeo, Young Thug	none
"In My Feelings" (Remix)	2017	Verse Simmonds, Pitbull, Ayo Jay	none
"Ride Daddy"	2017	DJ Whoo Kid, O.T. Genasis	none
"Mr Mechanic"	2018	2C	none
"Skelebe"	2018	Samklef	none
"Time or Money" (Remix)	2018	2C	none
"Let Me Hear You Calling"	2018	Gold 1	none
"Celebration"	2019	Maffio, Farruko, Ky-Mani Marley	none
"Love Riddim" (Remix)	2019	Rotimi	The Beauty of Becoming
"Billin $ Billin"	2019	Chacal	none
"Disfraza"	2019	IAmChino	none
"Girls Like U" (The Akon Self-Isolation Remix)	2020	Maroon 5	none
"Locked Up Pt. 2"	2020	6ix9ine	TattleTales
"Leah"	2020	6ix9ine	TattleTales

== Music videos ==
=== As lead artist ===
List of music videos as lead artist, showing year released and directors
Title	Year	Director(s)
"Operations of Nature"	1996	Francis Lawrence
"Locked Up"	2004	Kai Crawford
"Locked Up" (Remix) (featuring Styles P)	2004	Kai Crawford
"Ghetto"	2004	Little X
"Lonely"	2005	Gil Green
"Belly Dancer (Bananza)"	2005	Erik White
"Pot of Gold"	2005	Gil Green
"Smack That" (featuring Eminem)	2006	Benny Boom
"I Wanna Love You" (featuring Snoop Dogg)	2006	Benny Boom
"Don't Matter"	2007	Gil Green
"Sorry, Blame It on Me"	2007	Chris Robinson
"I Can't Wait" (featuring T-Pain)	2008	Bryan Barber
"Right Now (Na Na Na)"	2008	Anthony Mandler
"I'm So Paid" (featuring Lil Wayne and Young Jeezy)	2008	Gil Green
"Beautiful" (featuring Colby O'Donis and Kardinal Offishall)	2009	Gil Green
"We Don't Care"	2009	Gil Green
"Oh Africa" (featuring Keri Hilson)	2010	Gil Green
"Hold My Hand" (with Michael Jackson)	2010	Mark Pellington
"Hurt Somebody" (featuring French Montana)	2012	Gil Green
"So Blue"	2013	Robby Starbuck
"Shine The Light"	2016	
"Warrior" (with RedOne)	2016	
"Get Money" (featuring Anuel AA)	2019	
"Wakonda" (Unofficial Video)	2019	Mazi O.
"Como No" (featuring Becky G)	2019	
"Can't Say No"	2019	Rock Davis
"Benjamin"	2019	Rock Davis
"Low Key"	2019	Mazi O.
"Wakonda" (Official Video)	2019	Mazi O.
"Te Quiero Amar" (featuring Pitbull)	2020	Chico Verde, Gil Green

== See also ==
- Akon production discography
