= Akon production discography =

The following is the discography of production work by Senegalese American singer, songwriter, and record producer Akon.

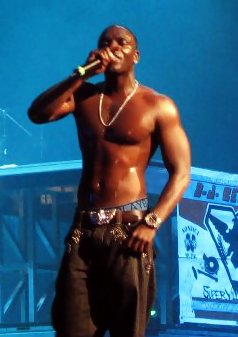
Akon performing in 2007

== 1996 ==
=== Akon - Operations of Nature ===
- "Operations of Nature"
- "Operations of Nature (Remix)"
- "Crack Rock"

== 2000 ==
=== Lil Zane - Young World: The Future ===
- 04. "What Must I Do"
- 11. "What's Up"

=== Devyne Stephens - Non-album single ===
- Un-Huh

== 2001 ==
=== Don Yute - Adrenalin ===
- 02. "This Boy Here"

== 2003 ==
=== Don Yute - Win Lose or Draw ===
- 18. "Oh Mama"

=== Loon - Loon ===
- 10. "Like a Movie"

== 2004 ==
=== 404 Soldierz - All Out War ===
- 09. "We Do" (featuring Akon)

=== Akon - Trouble ===
- 01. "Locked Up"
- 02. "Trouble Nobody"
- 03. "Belly Dancer (Bananza)"
- 04. "Gangsta"
- 05. "Ghetto"
- 06. "Pot of Gold"
- 07. "Show Out"
- 08. "Lonely"
- 09. "When the Time's Right"
- 10. "Journey"
- 11. "Don't Let Up"
- 12. "Easy Road
- 13. "Locked Up (Remix)" (featuring Styles P.)

== 2005 ==
=== Baby Bash - Super Saucy ===
- 01. "Baby I'm Back" (featuring Akon)

=== C-Murder - The Truest Shit I Ever Said ===
- 05. "Won't Let Me Out" (featuring Akon)

=== Savage - Moonshine ===
- 05. "Moonshine" (featuring Akon)
- 05. "Locked Up (Remix)" (Akon featuring Savage)

=== Youngbloodz- Ev'rybody Know Me ===
- 16. "Presidential (Remix)"(featuring Akon)

=== Miri Ben-Ari - The Hip-Hop Violinist ===
- 09. "Miss Melody" (featuring Akon)

=== Ruff Ryders - Vol. 4: The Redemption ===
- 09. "Stay Down" (featuring Flashy & Akon)

=== Young Jeezy - Let's Get It: Thug Motivation 101 ===
- 14. "Soul Survivor" (featuring Akon)

=== T-Pain - Rappa Turnt Sanga ===
- 05. "You Got Me" (featuring Akon)

== 2006 ==
=== Various Artists - The Shaggy Dog (soundtrack) ===
- 09. "Big Dog"

=== Rick Ross - Port of Miami ===
- 05. "Cross That Line" (featuring Akon)

=== Obie Trice - Second Round's on Me ===
- 06. "Snitch" (featuring Akon)

=== Akon - Konvicted ===
- 01. "Shake Down" {produced with Giorgio Tuinfort}
- 02. "Blown Away" {produced with Giorgio Tuinfort}
- 04. "I Wanna Love You" (featuring Snoop Dogg)
- 05. "The Rain"
- 06. "Never Took the Time"
- 07. "Mama Africa"
- 08. "I Can't Wait" (produced with T-Pain)
- 09. "Gangsta Bop" {produced with Troo L.S. & Rask}
- 10. "Tired of Runnin'"
- 11. "Once in a While" {produced with Benny D}
- 12. "Don't Matter"
- 13. "Sorry, Blame It on Me"
- 14. "Rush" (featuring Kardinal Offishall)
- 15. "Don't Matter (Calypso Remix)"

=== Snoop Dogg - Tha Blue Carpet Treatment ===
- 16. "I Wanna Love You" (featuring Akon)

=== Gwen Stefani - The Sweet Escape ===
- 02. "The Sweet Escape" (featuring Akon)

== 2007 ==
=== Bone Thugs-N-Harmony - Strength and Loyalty ===
- 04. "I Tried" (featuring Akon)
- 14. "Never Forget Me" (featuring Akon)

=== Zion - The Perfect Melody ===
- 08. "The Way She Moves" (featuring Akon)

=== Daddy Yankee - El Cartel: The Big Boss ===
- 08. "Bring It On" (featuring Akon)

=== Fabolous - From Nothin' to Somethin' ===
- 03. "Change Up" (featuring Akon)

=== Rasheeda - Dat Type of Gurl ===
- 05. "Let It Clap" (featuring Akon)

=== Nicole Scherzinger - Non-album single ===
- Puakenikeni" {produced with Giorgio Tuinfort}

=== Plies - The Real Testament ===
- 14. "Hypnotized" (featuring Akon)

=== Brick and Lace - Love Is Wicked ===
- 01. "Get That Clear (Hold Up)"
- 02. "Never Never"
- 07. "Boyfriend"

=== Leona Lewis - Spirit ===
- 15. "Forgive Me"

=== Mario - Go! ===
- 12. "Do Right"

=== Styles P. - Super Gangster (Extraordinary Gentleman) ===
- 07. "Got My Eyes on You" (featuring Akon)

=== Wyclef Jean - Carnival Vol. II: Memoirs of an Immigrant ===
- 03. "Sweetest Girl (Dollar Bill)" (featuring Akon and Lil Wayne)

== 2008 ==
=== Various Artists - Step Up 2: The Streets ===
- 04. "Hypnotized" (featuring Akon)

=== Michael Jackson - Thriller 25 ===
- 13. "Wanna Be Startin' Somethin' 2008" (with Akon)

=== David Banner - The Greatest Story Ever Told ===
- 04. "9mm/Speaker" (featuring Akon, Lil Wayne and Snoop Dogg)

=== Ashanti - The Declaration ===
- 10. "Body on Me" (featuring Nelly and Akon)

=== Three 6 Mafia - Last 2 Walk ===
- 07. "That's Right" (featuring Akon and Jim Jones)

=== Kardinal Offishall - Not 4 Sale ===
- 14. "Due Me a Favour" (featuring Estelle)

=== New Kids on the Block – The Block ===
- 01. "Click Click Click"

=== Colby O'Donis - Colby O ===
- 01. "What You Got" (featuring Akon)
- 05. "Don't Turn Back" (produced with Clinton Sparks)

=== Nelly - Brass Knuckles ===
- 08. "Body on Me" (featuring Ashanti and Akon)

=== DJ Khaled - We Global ===
- 03. "Out Here Grindin" (featuring Akon, Rick Ross, Plies, Lil Boosie, Ace Hood and Trick Daddy)
  (produced with The Runners)

=== Sway - The Signature LP ===
- 04. "Silver & Gold" (featuring Akon)
- 08. "Pray 4 Kaya"

=== T-Pain - Thr33 Ringz ===
- 08. "It Ain't Me" (featuring Akon & T.I.)

=== Akon - Freedom ===
- 01. "Right Now (Na Na Na)"
- 02. "Beautiful" (featuring Colby O'Donis and Kardinal Offishall)
- 03. "Keep You Much Longer"
- 04. "Troublemaker"
- 05. "We Don't Care"
- 06. "I'm So Paid" (featuring Lil Wayne and Young Jeezy)
- 07. "Holla Holla" (featuring T-Pain)
- 08. "Against the Grain" (featuring Ray Lavender)
- 09. "Be With You"
- 10. "Sunny Day" (featuring Wyclef Jean)
- 11. "Birthmark"
- 12. "Over the Edge"
- 13. "Freedom"
- 14. "Clap Again"

== 2009 ==
=== Romeo - Get Low ===
- 01. "Get Low wit It" (featuring Akon)

=== UGK - UGK 4 Life ===
- 14. "Hard as Hell" (featuring Akon)

=== Whitney Houston - I Look to You ===
- 05. "Like I Never Left" (featuring Akon)
- 10. "I Got You"

=== Mary J. Blige - Stronger with Each Tear ===
- 01. "Tonight"

== 2010 ==
=== Michael Jackson - Michael ===
- 01. "Hold My Hand" (featuring Akon)

== 2011 ==
=== Natalia Kills - Perfectionist ===
- 07. "Mirrors"

=== DJ Drama - Third Power ===
- 11. "Lock Down" (with Ya Boy featuring Akon)

== 2012 ==
=== Jeffree Star - Non-album single ===
- 00. "Prom Night!"

=== Xzibit - Napalm ===
- 15. "Movies" (featuring Game, Crooked I, Slim the Mobster and Young De)

=== Estelle - All of Me ===
- 08. "Thank You" (co-written by Akon)

== 2014 ==
=== Sean Paul - Full Frequency ===
- 11. "Lights On"

== 2015 ==
=== Jadakiss - Top 5 Dead or Alive ===
- 05. "Y.O. (Youthful Offenders)" (featuring Akon)

=== Monica - Code Red ===
- 08. "Hustler's Ambition" (featuring Akon)
  (co-produced with DJ HardWerk and Lindsay "Mavelle" Gilbert)

== 2022 ==
=== The Chainsmokers - So Far So Good ===
- 07. "I Love U"

== Singles produced by Akon ==
- 2004
  - "Locked Up" - (Akon)
- 2005
  - "Lonely" - (Akon)
  - "Ghetto" - (Akon)
  - "Belly Dancer (Bananza)" - (Akon)
  - "Pot of Gold" - (Akon)
  - "Soul Survivor" - (Young Jeezy featuring Akon)
  - "Baby I'm Back" - (Baby Bash featuring Akon)
- 2006
  - "Snitch" - (Obie Trice featuring Akon)
  - "I Wanna Love You" - (Akon featuring Snoop Dogg)
  - "The Sweet Escape" - (Gwen Stefani featuring Akon)
- 2007
  - "Don't Matter" - (Akon)
  - "Never Never" - (Brick & Lace)
  - "I Tried" - (Bone Thugs-n-Harmony featuring Akon)
  - "Get That Clear (Hold Up)" - (Brick & Lace)
  - "The Way She Moves" - (Zion featuring Akon)
  - "Hypnotized" - (Plies featuring Akon)
  - "Losin' It" - (Rock City)
  - "Boyz (Remix)" - (M.I.A. featuring Akon and Rock City)
  - "Puakenikeni" - (Nicole Scherzinger featuring Brick & Lace)
  - "Who the Fuck Is That?" (Dolla featuring T-Pain and Tay Dizm)
  - "Do Right" - (Mario)
  - "Boyfriend" - (Brick & Lace)
- 2008
  - "Just Dance" - (Lady Gaga featuring Colby O'Donis, co-written by Akon)
  - "Forgive Me" - (Leona Lewis)
  - "Right Now (Na Na Na)" - (Akon)
  - "Beautiful" - (Akon featuring Colby O'Donis and Kardinal Offishall)
  - "I'm So Paid" - (Akon featuring Lil Wayne and Young Jeezy)
  - "We Don't Care" - (Akon)
- 2009
  - "Just Go" - (Lionel Richie featuring Akon)
  - "Bang Bang" - (Brick & Lace)
  - "Club It Up" - (Brick & Lace)
- 2010
  - "Mirrors" - (Natalia Kills)
  - "Hold My Hand" - (Michael Jackson featuring Akon)
- 2011
  - "Lock Down" - (DJ Drama featuring Ya Boy and Akon)
  - "Thank You" - (Estelle, written by Akon)
- 2012
  - "Prom Night" - (Jeffree Star)
