= Faarrow =

Canadian music group

FAARROW
- Origin: Toronto, Ontario, Canada
- Genres: Pop, R&B
- Years active: 2007–2016
- Label: Warner Bros. Records
- Members: Siham and Iman Hashi
- Website: http://www.faarrow.com/

Faarrow is a Canadian Pop and R&B musical duo. Consisting of Somali sisters Siham and Iman Hashi, the group released their debut EP "Lost" in 2016.

== Personal life ==
Siham and Iman Hashi were born in Mogadishu. Their mother was a diplomat, whose work stationed the family in various countries, including Saudi Arabia for one to two years, and Germany. After civil war broke out in Somalia in 1991, the family relocated to Toronto, Canada.

Growing up, Siham and Iman loved music and would sing around the house. They never had any formal musical training, as they were raised in a traditional Muslim home, where emphasis was instead placed on education.

Besides their musical career, the sisters are involved in philanthropic work through their non-profit foundation.

== Career ==
In 2007, the sisters moved to Atlanta, Georgia to pursue a recording career. Their parents were reluctant to allow them to go due to their traditional upbringing. However, their father finally acquiesced under the condition that the girls would live with his sister and would resume their studies at a later date.

They were subsequently signed to Universal Motown, becoming the first female artists of Somali descent to sign a record deal with a major U.S. label.

In 2009-2010, the duo began recording its first album Sweet Rush in Los Angeles. According to the group, the record was originally intended to be called Sweet and Spicy. It was instead eponymously titled due to the sisters' "sweet" stage persona and the "rush" that characterizes their sound, the latter of which attempts to fuse traditional Somali music with modern production.

Singles include "Hot Sauce". The duo has also collaborated with Esther Dean and Akon on Troublemaker, as well as Rock City.

Faarrow's main musical influences include the Spice Girls, Mariah Carey, Michael Jackson, Whitney Houston and Mika.

The band name Faarrow is a fusion of the meanings of their respective names translated from Arabic ("faith" and "arrow).

== Philanthropy ==
In the 2000s, Siham and Iman established Somalia Lives Again, a non-profit organization which aims to give back to their country of birth. They have also raised proceeds for humanitarian work through their Wish Creatively initiative, which sells handmade jewelry. Additionally, the band has performed on World Refugee Day in Tunisia, and at the UNHCR's Nansen Refugee Award ceremony.

== Discography ==
=== Extended plays ===
Title	Album details
Lost	Released: 15 July 2016; Label: Warner Bros. Records; Format: Digital download

=== Singles ===
Year	Single	Album
2013	"Rule the World"	Non-album singles
2013	"Say My Name"	Non-album singles
2016	"Lost"	Non-album singles
