= Smack That =

2006 single by Akon featuring Eminem

Single by Akon featuring Eminem

from the album Konvicted
- Released: September 26, 2006
- Recorded: 2006
- Genre: R&B
- Length: 3:32
- Label: Konvict; UpFront; SRC; Universal Motown
- Songwriters: Aliaune Thiam; Marshall Mathers; Luis Resto; Mike Strange
- Producer: Eminem

Akon singles chronology
"Snitch" (2005)	"Smack That" (2006)	"I Wanna Love You" (2006)

Eminem singles chronology
"Shake That" (2006)	"Smack That" (2006)	"You Don't Know" (2006)

Music video
- "Smack That" on YouTube

"Smack That" is a song by Senegalese-American singer Akon featuring American rapper Eminem from the former's second studio album, Konvicted (2006). It was released as the lead single from the album on September 26, 2006. Produced by Eminem, it was written by the artists alongside Mike Strange and Luis Resto. The collaboration came after the two artists met during a recording session for Shady Records rapper Obie Trice.

"Smack That" received widespread acclaim from contemporary music critics for being a great club song. Commercially, the song reached number one on ten record charts and peaked inside the top ten in nine countries, including the Billboard Hot 100, where it peaked at number two. It received several gold and platinum certifications and was certified Diamond in the United States. The song earned a Grammy nomination for Best Rap/Sung Collaboration.

== Background and release ==
In the year 2006, Akon met Eminem during his recording sessions for Snitch with rapper Obie Trice, a Shady Records signee at the time, and the two quickly became friends. Akon wanted him to be on "Smack That", but knew about Eminem's claims of being featured on too many songs. After receiving a call from the rapper saying he was ready to go, Akon flew out to Detroit. On recording with Eminem, Akon stated: "We felt that we could do a record that fit both our personalities and was a fun club record...it was no different than working with any of the other artists, really."

"Smack That" was written, produced, and programmed by Eminem, with additional writing from Akon, Mike Strange, and Luis Resto. Strange and Resto also played the keyboards present on the track. Strange worked with Tony Compana to record the song, which took place at 54 Sound in Detroit, Michigan, where Strange also mixed the song with Eminem.

"Smack That" was serviced to mainstream and rhythmic crossover radio on September 12, 2006, in the United States, and was released worldwide for digital distribution on September 25, 2006. A two-track version of the single, featuring "Senegal" as a B-side, was released internationally on October 9, 2006. That same day, an extended play containing two extra songs – "Miss Melody" and "Senegal" – was released.

== Critical reception ==
"Smack That" received critical acclaim. DJ Z of DJBooth, in a review of the single, commended "Smack That" for showcasing "Akon's ability to sound perfect over any tempo beat." In his review for the album as a whole, DJ Z wrote that the song and "I Wanna Love You" display Akon's skill during collaboration. Michael Enelman of Entertainment Weekly lauded the collaboration with Eminem as the "liveliest." David Marchese of Spin magazine classified the single as "Played-out G-funk braggadocio and bedroom boasting." Elysa Gardner of USA Today lauded it as "irresistibly slick." A writer for The Manila Times deemed the song "deliriously energetic" while claiming it has "all the ingredients of a masterful club banger."

Dan Raper of PopMatters had a mixed opinion about Eminem's feature, writing that the lower register he adopts for his voice is "not totally successful", but added that it "shows some innovation from the Old White Rapper." Ivan Rott wrote a more negative review of the song, dismissing its production as "prosaic" and its lyrics as "uninspired." He further added that the song "holds no weight in comparison to current club tracks such as "Money Maker," the bouncy collaboration between Ludacris and Pharrell, among others. Expect "Smack That" to drop off the charts as fast as it popped up."

"Smack That" was nominated for Best Rap/Sung Collaboration at the 2007 Grammy Awards, but lost to Justin Timberlake's "My Love".

== Chart performance ==
In the United States, "Smack That" debuted on the Billboard Hot 100 at No. 95 on the issue dated October 7, 2006. One week later, the song jumped 88 spots to No. 7, aided by its digital download sales (67,000) and rise in radio impression (30.5 million audience). The song earned the distinction of achieving the highest jump on the Hot 100 chart at the time. Three weeks later, aided by the strength of 91,500 downloads, the song climbed to its peak position at number two, where it remained for five consecutive weeks, barred from the top spot by Ludacris' "Money Maker", Justin Timberlake's "My Love", and Akon's own single "I Wanna Love You". "Smack That" has sold over 3,227,000 downloads as of April 29, 2012, and earned a Diamond certification by the Recording Industry Association of America in 2026.

In Europe, "Smack That" experienced commercial success. In the United Kingdom, the song debuted at number 12 on November 12, 2006, and rose to number one in the following week, becoming Akon's second and Eminem's seventh UK number one. The single was successful in Belgium, topping the chart in Wallonia and peaking at number three in the Dutch-language Flanders region. It was later certified gold by the Belgian Entertainment Association (BEA). In Sweden, the song debuted at number nine on October 12, 2006. Three weeks later, it reached a peak of number three, where it remained for three non-consecutive weeks. "Smack That" earned a Platinum certification from the Grammofonleverantörernas förening (GLF) in 2007. The song peaked at number one in Czech Republic, Ireland, Norway, and Slovakia.

"Smack That" entered the singles chart in Australia on November 13, 2006, at number five. The song fluctuated within the top 10 for six weeks before reaching its peak at number two, a position it held for three nonconsecutive weeks. The single lasted 26 weeks on the chart and earned a platinum certification from the Australian Recording Industry Association (ARIA). In New Zealand, "Smack That" debuted on the singles chart in New Zealand on November 20, 2006, at number two. The song held the position for two more weeks before falling to number 14 in its fourth week and 21 in its fifth week. The single got a second wind, rising to number five in the following week. Two weeks later, "Smack That" reached the chart's summit, where it remained for four nonconcsecutive weeks. The song earned a gold certification from the Recorded Music NZ (RMNZ).

== Music video ==
The song's music video is a short-clip remake of the 1982 film 48 Hrs. Directed by Benny Boom, it presents Akon as a convict in prison who is let out of jail by a police officer, Jack Gates (Eric Roberts), who is looking for a witness. Akon is let out for 24 hours to do anything he pleases as long as he can find the female witness. He is given a photo of her and follows a lead he was given that the witness is in a nightclub. While in the club, Akon meets up with his fellow rapper and friend Eminem. Akon finds the female witness and escapes from the nightclub without Jack Gates. This is the first video that features Eminem with his then-new tattoo 'PROOF' on his left arm, which is dedicated to his friend, Proof who was murdered after he was shot by a bouncer in an after-hours spot. The video also features cameos from Fat Joe, Lil' Fizz of B2K, Layzie Bone, Nas, and Kendra Wilkinson (of E!'s The Girls Next Door) and actor Mark Casimir Dyniewicz Jr. as the bartender. The lead dancer at the club was choreographer Criscilla Anderson, who died in December 2025 from colon cancer. The music video was nominated for Best Earthshattering Collaboration and Male Artist of the Year at the 2007 MTV Video Music Awards. The video also received three nominations for Best Male Artist, Best Hip Hop Video, and Best Hook-Up at the 2007 MTV Australia Video Music Awards.

In February 2023, the music video reached one billion views on YouTube.

== Remix ==
"Smack That" was remixed on Eminem Presents: The Re-Up. The remix features vocals from Stat Quo and Bobby Creekwater. The second and third line of the original's beginning is cut out. Akon sings the first verse, which has different lyrics to the original, Stat Quo sings the second verse and Bobby Creekwater sings the third verse.

== Awards and nominations ==
Year	Ceremony	Award	Result
2006	Guinness World Records	Most entries jumped on US hot 100 chart (with Eminem)	Won
2007	Grammy Awards	Best Rap/Sung Collaboration (with Eminem)	Nominated

== Track listing ==
These are the formats and track listings of major single releases of "Smack That".

Digital download

No.	Title	Writer(s)	Producer(s)	Length
1.	"Smack That" (featuring Eminem)	Aliaune Thiam; Marshall Mathers; Luis Resto; Mike Strange	Eminem	3:33

Digital download (clean version)

No.	Title	Writer(s)	Producer(s)	Length
1.	"Smack That" (clean) (featuring Eminem)	Aliaune Thiam; Marshall Mathers; Luis Resto; Mike Strange	Eminem	3:33

Digital single (2 track version)

No.	Title	Writer(s)	Producer(s)	Length
1.	"Smack That" (clean) (featuring Eminem)	Aliaune Thiam; Marshall Mathers; Luis Resto; Mike Strange	Eminem	3:33
2.	"Senegal"	Thiam; Anthony Hamilton; Mark Batson	Akon	2:52
Total length:				6:25

EP

No.	Title	Writer(s)	Producer(s)	Length
1.	"Smack That" (clean) (featuring Eminem)	Aliaune Thiam; Marshall Mathers; Luis Resto; Mike Strange	Eminem	3:33
2.	"Miss Melody" (Miri Ben-Ari featuring Akon)	Miri Ben-Ari; Thiam	Akon; Miri Ben-Ari	5:44
3.	"Senegal"	Thiam; Anthony Hamilton; Mark Batson	Akon	2:51
Total length:				12:08

NBA version

No.	Title	Writer(s)	Producer(s)	Length
1.	"Smack That" (NBA version)	Aliaune Thiam; Marshall Mathers; Luis Resto; Mike Strange	Eminem	1:22

== Credits and personnel ==
Locations

- Recorded and mixed at 54 Sound in Detroit, Michigan

Personnel

- Akon – songwriting, vocals
- Tony Compana – recording
- Eminem – songwriting, production, programming, mixing
- Luis Resto – songwriting, keyboards
- Mike Strange – songwriting, recording, mixing, keyboards

== Charts ==
=== Weekly charts ===
Weekly chart performance for "Smack That"
Chart (2006–2007)	Peak position
Australia (ARIA)	2
Australian Urban (ARIA)	1
Austria (Ö3 Austria Top 40)	9
Belgium (Ultratop 50 Flanders)	3
Belgium (Ultratop 50 Wallonia)	1
Canada (Nielsen SoundScan)	4
Canada CHR/Top 40 (Billboard)	2
CIS Airplay (TopHit)	9
Czech Republic Airplay (ČNS IFPI)	3
Denmark (Tracklisten)	3
Finland (Suomen virallinen lista)	3
France (SNEP)	4
Germany (GfK)	5
Greece (IFPI)	13
Hungary (Rádiós Top 40)	2
Hungary (Dance Top 40)	1
Hungary (Single Top 40)	1
Ireland (IRMA)	1
Italy (FIMI)	17
Netherlands (Dutch Top 40)	6
Netherlands (Single Top 100)	6
New Zealand (Recorded Music NZ)	1
Norway (VG-lista)	1
Romania (Romanian Top 100)	1
Russia Airplay (TopHit)	9
Scottish Singles Sales (Official Charts)	2
Slovakia Airplay (ČNS IFPI)	1
Sweden (Sverigetopplistan)	3
Switzerland (Schweizer Hitparade)	3
UK Singles (Official Charts)	1
UK Hip Hop/R&B (Official Charts)	1
US Billboard Hot 100	2
US Pop Airplay (Billboard)	4
US Hot Latin Songs (Billboard)	44
US Hot R&B/Hip-Hop Songs (Billboard)	34
US Rhythmic Airplay (Billboard)	1

Chart (2024)	Peak position
Greece International (IFPI)	97

=== Year-end charts ===
2006 year-end chart performance for "Smack That"
Chart (2006)	Position
Australia (ARIA)	26
Belgium (Ultratop 50 Flanders)	69
CIS (TopHit)	132
Germany (Media Control GfK)	97
Russia Airplay (TopHit)	139
Sweden (Hitlistan)	7
Switzerland (Schweizer Hitparade)	38
UK Singles (OCC)	27
UK Urban (Music Week)	40
US Billboard Hot 100	66

2007 year-end chart performance for "Smack That"
Chart (2007)	Position
Australia (ARIA)	34
Belgium (Ultratop 50 Flanders)	37
Belgium (Ultratop 50 Wallonia)	35
Brazil (Crowley)	21
CIS (TopHit)	76
Europe (European Hot 100 Singles)	18
France (SNEP)	30
Germany (Media Control GfK)	50
Hungary (Dance Top 40)	27
Hungary (Rádiós Top 40)	10
Netherlands (Dutch Top 40)	60
Netherlands (Single Top 100)	68
New Zealand (RIANZ)	31
Russia Airplay (TopHit)	83
Sweden (Sverigetopplistan)	52
Switzerland (Schweizer Hitparade)	51
UK Singles (OCC)	80
US Billboard Hot 100	15
US Rhythmic Airplay (Billboard)	25

=== Decade-end charts ===
2000s-end chart performance for "Smack That"
Chart (2000–2009)	Position
US Billboard Hot 100	76

== Certifications ==
Certifications for "Smack That"
Region	Certification	Certified units/sales
Australia (ARIA)	7× Platinum	490,000^{‡}
Belgium (BRMA)	Gold	25,000^{*}
Brazil (Pro-Música Brasil) DMS	Platinum	60,000^{*}
Brazil (Pro-Música Brasil)	Diamond	250,000^{‡}
Denmark (IFPI Danmark)	2× Platinum	180,000^{‡}
Germany (BVMI)	Platinum	600,000^{‡}
Italy (FIMI)	Gold	50,000^{‡}
New Zealand (RMNZ)	6× Platinum	180,000^{‡}
Spain (Promusicae)	Gold	30,000^{‡}
Sweden (GLF)	Platinum	20,000^{^}
United Kingdom (BPI)	3× Platinum	1,800,000^{‡}
United States (RIAA)	Diamond	10,000,000^{‡}
Mastertone
Canada (Music Canada)	8× Platinum	320,000^{*}
United States (RIAA)	3× Platinum	3,000,000^{*}
Streaming
Greece (IFPI Greece)	3× Platinum	6,000,000^{†}
^{*} Sales figures based on certification alone.^{^} Shipments figures based on certification alone.^{‡} Sales+streaming figures based on certification alone.^{†} Streaming-only figures based on certification alone.

== Release history ==
Country	Date	Format	Label
Australia	September 25, 2006	Digital download	Universal; SRC
Austria	September 25, 2006	Digital download	Universal; SRC
Belgium	September 25, 2006	Digital download	Universal; SRC
Brazil	September 25, 2006	Digital download	Universal; SRC
Czech Republic	September 25, 2006	Digital download	Universal; SRC
Denmark	September 25, 2006	Digital download	Universal; SRC
Finland	September 25, 2006	Digital download	Universal; SRC
France	September 25, 2006	Digital download	Universal; SRC
Germany	September 25, 2006	Digital download	Universal; SRC
Hungary	September 25, 2006	Digital download	Universal; SRC
Ireland	September 25, 2006	Digital download	Universal; SRC
Italy	September 25, 2006	Digital download	Universal; SRC
Japan	September 25, 2006	Digital download	Universal; SRC
Netherlands	September 25, 2006	Digital download	Universal; SRC
Norway	September 25, 2006	Digital download	Universal; SRC
New Zealand	September 25, 2006	Digital download	Universal; SRC
Poland	September 25, 2006	Digital download	Universal; SRC
Slovakia	September 25, 2006	Digital download	Universal; SRC
Spain	September 25, 2006	Digital download	Universal; SRC
Switzerland	September 25, 2006	Digital download	Universal; SRC
United Kingdom	September 25, 2006	Digital download	Universal; SRC
Australia	October 9, 2006	Digital download	Universal; SRC
Belgium	October 9, 2006	Digital download	Universal; SRC
Brazil	October 9, 2006	Digital download	Universal; SRC
Czech Republic	October 9, 2006	Digital download	Universal; SRC
Denmark	October 9, 2006	Digital download	Universal; SRC
Finland	October 9, 2006	Digital download	Universal; SRC
Germany	October 9, 2006	Digital download	Universal; SRC
Hungary	October 9, 2006	Digital download	Universal; SRC
Italy	October 9, 2006	Digital download	Universal; SRC
Netherlands	October 9, 2006	Digital download	Universal; SRC
Norway	October 9, 2006	Digital download	Universal; SRC
New Zealand	October 9, 2006	Digital download	Universal; SRC
Poland	October 9, 2006	Digital download	Universal; SRC
Slovakia	October 9, 2006	Digital download	Universal; SRC
Switzerland	October 9, 2006	Digital download	Universal; SRC
Australia	October 9, 2006	2 track single	Universal; SRC
Austria	October 9, 2006	2 track single	Universal; SRC
Belgium	October 9, 2006	2 track single	Universal; SRC
Czech Republic	October 9, 2006	2 track single	Universal; SRC
Denmark	October 9, 2006	2 track single	Universal; SRC
Finland	October 9, 2006	2 track single	Universal; SRC
France	October 9, 2006	2 track single	Universal; SRC
Germany	October 9, 2006	2 track single	Universal; SRC
Hungary	October 9, 2006	2 track single	Universal; SRC
Ireland	October 9, 2006	2 track single	Universal; SRC
Italy	October 9, 2006	2 track single	Universal; SRC
Japan	October 9, 2006	2 track single	Universal; SRC
Netherlands	October 9, 2006	2 track single	Universal; SRC
Norway	October 9, 2006	2 track single	Universal; SRC
New Zealand	October 9, 2006	2 track single	Universal; SRC
Poland	October 9, 2006	2 track single	Universal; SRC
Slovakia	October 9, 2006	2 track single	Universal; SRC
Switzerland	October 9, 2006	2 track single	Universal; SRC
Australia	October 9, 2006	EP	Universal; SRC
Austria	October 9, 2006	EP	Universal; SRC
Belgium	October 9, 2006	EP	Universal; SRC
Brazil	October 9, 2006	EP	Universal; SRC
Czech Republic	October 9, 2006	EP	Universal; SRC
Denmark	October 9, 2006	EP	Universal; SRC
Finland	October 9, 2006	EP	Universal; SRC
France	October 9, 2006	EP	Universal; SRC
Germany	October 9, 2006	EP	Universal; SRC
Hungary	October 9, 2006	EP	Universal; SRC
Ireland	October 9, 2006	EP	Universal; SRC
Italy	October 9, 2006	EP	Universal; SRC
Japan	October 9, 2006	EP	Universal; SRC
Netherlands	October 9, 2006	EP	Universal; SRC
Norway	October 9, 2006	EP	Universal; SRC
New Zealand	October 9, 2006	EP	Universal; SRC
Poland	October 9, 2006	EP	Universal; SRC
Slovakia	October 9, 2006	EP	Universal; SRC
Sweden	October 9, 2006	EP	Universal; SRC
Switzerland	October 9, 2006	EP	Universal; SRC
United Kingdom	October 9, 2006	EP	Universal; SRC
Australia	February 5, 2007	NBA version	Universal; SRC
Austria	February 5, 2007	NBA version	Universal; SRC
Belgium	February 5, 2007	NBA version	Universal; SRC
Brazil	February 5, 2007	NBA version	Universal; SRC
Czech Republic	February 5, 2007	NBA version	Universal; SRC
Denmark	February 5, 2007	NBA version	Universal; SRC
Finland	February 5, 2007	NBA version	Universal; SRC
France	February 5, 2007	NBA version	Universal; SRC
German	February 5, 2007	NBA version	Universal; SRC
Hungary	February 5, 2007	NBA version	Universal; SRC
Italy	February 5, 2007	NBA version	Universal; SRC
Japan	February 5, 2007	NBA version	Universal; SRC
Netherlands	February 5, 2007	NBA version	Universal; SRC
Norway	February 5, 2007	NBA version	Universal; SRC
New Zealand	February 5, 2007	NBA version	Universal; SRC
Poland	February 5, 2007	NBA version	Universal; SRC
Slovakia	February 5, 2007	NBA version	Universal; SRC
Sweden	February 5, 2007	NBA version	Universal; SRC
Switzerland	February 5, 2007	NBA version	Universal; SRC

== See also ==
- List of Romanian Top 100 number ones of the 2000s
