= I'm Day Dreaming =

2011 single by Redd

Single by Redd featuring Akon and Snoop Dogg
- Released: 14 November 2011
- Genre: House, Eurodance
- Length: 4:03
- Label: DJ Center Music Group
- Songwriter(s): Calvin Broadus, Christopher Gholson, Clifford Harris, Aliaune Thiam, Stephen Singer
- Producer(s): Stephen Singer, David May

I'm Day Dreaming is a single by singer Redd, featuring American singer Akon and American rapper Snoop Dogg. The song was released in 2011. It is a remix of the DJ Drama song "Day Dreaming", which also features Akon and Snoop Dogg, along with an extra verse from T.I. This version does not include the latter's verse, but instead features a post-chorus from Redd.

== Charts ==
Chart (2011–2012)	Peak Position
Austria (Ö3 Austria Top 40)	41
Germany (GfK)	53
Switzerland (Schweizer Hitparade)	29
UK Singles (OCC)	71
