= Angel (Akon song) =

Single by Akon
- Released: September 17, 2010
- Recorded: 2010
- Length: 3:35
- Label: Konvict Muzik; UpFront Megatainment; SRC Records; Universal Motown Records
- Songwriters: Aliaune Thiam, David Guetta, Sandy Wilhelm
- Producers: David Guetta, Sandy Vee

Akon singles chronology
"Body Bounce" (2010)	"Angel" (2010)	"Move That Body" (2010)

Music video
- "Angel" on YouTube

"Angel" is a song by Akon. The track was written by Akon, David Guetta and Sandy Wilhelm, and produced by David Guetta and Sandy Vee. The single was released to U.S. mainstream radio on September 14, 2010, before being released as a digital download on September 17. The single was released by worldwide digital download on November 7, 2010. The song peaked at number fifty-six on Billboard Hot 100. Akon performed the song during the 2010 Victoria's Secret Fashion Show, and it was also used in the Victoria's Secret 2011 Secret Angels commercial. The song was not released on any physical formats.

== Charts ==
Chart (2010–11)	Peak position
Australia (ARIA)	57
Belgium (Ultratip Bubbling Under Flanders)	5
Belgium (Ultratip Bubbling Under Wallonia)	6
Brazil (Billboard) Hot 100	13
Canada (Canadian Hot 100)	23
Czech Republic (Rádio – Top 100)	34
Finland (Suomen virallinen lista)	10
New Zealand (RIANZ)	20
Sweden (Sverigetopplistan)	23
US Billboard Hot 100	56
US Pop Airplay (Billboard)	31

=== Year-end charts ===
Chart (2011)	Position
Brazil (Crowley)	74

== Certifications ==
Region	Certification	Certified units/sales
New Zealand (RMNZ)	Gold	7,500^{*}
United States (RIAA)	Gold	500,000^{*}
^{*} Sales figures based on certification alone.
