= Akon Lighting Africa =

Solar energy project to provide electricity

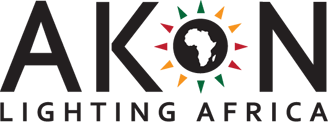
- Mission statement: Providing Africans with access to electricity
- Type of project: Non Commercial
- Location: Nations in Africa
- Owner: Akon
- Founder: Akon
- Established: February 2014
- Funding: China Jiangsu International Economic And Technical Cooperation Group
- Status: Active

Akon Lighting Africa is a project started in 2014 by music artist Akon with Samba Bathily and Thione Niang which aims to provide electricity by solar energy in Africa. Their initial technique is to install solar street lights and small energy systems.

== History ==
According to Akon (Aliaune Thiam, born in Missouri), he and Thione Niang grew up in Kaolack Region, Senegal, in a town without electricity. In 2013 both decided to help drive Africa’s transformation. Samba Bathily joined them and provided targeted solutions through his company, Solektra INT, which supplies solar-powered equipment. By combining their networks, they launched the project in February 2014. Their initial technique is to install solar street lights and small energy systems.

The projects provided electricity in 14 African countries as of 2015 and employed over 5000 people, and Akon said they have reached 1 million households in African nations with their projects. The employees, newly trained, were mainly young people who install and maintain solar equipment. This initiative has taken advantage of the tariffs imposed by the US on Chinese solar panels, leaving the Chinese manufacturers with stock to sell, by lining up credit with China Jiangsu International Economic And Technical Cooperation Group to finance purchase of solar equipment, which allows the nations participating in the project to bypass World Bank loans to get a project started in their own nation.

In an interview, Akon estimated that they have reached 100,000 households and installed 13,000 streetlights. Their approach is to speak with officials at the national level as to villages that are likely for pilot projects in that nation. Once a pilot project is successful, other villages will want the same amount of street lighting and household electricity.

== Countries ==
Since launching in 2014, Akon's group has operations in 14 nations, including Guinea, Senegal, Mali, Niger, Benin and Sierra Leone.

== Solektra Solar Academy ==
The group announced the launch of the solar academy in Bamako, Mali, at the second United Nations Sustainable Energy for All Forum, in New York City. Solar Academy will teach students about using solar panels by which they can light Africa. Samba Bathily told in an interview: "We have the sun and innovative technologies to bring electricity to homes and communities. We now need to consolidate African expertise and that is our objective." New cooperations are being built with international researchers to boost energy transition in Africa.

== See also ==
- Solar power in Africa
