= I'm So Paid =

Single by Akon featuring Lil Wayne and Young Jeezy

from the album Freedom
- Released: October 4, 2008 (U.S.)
- Genre: R&B; hip-hop
- Length: 4:23
- Label: Konvict; Universal Motown
- Songwriters: Aliaune Thiam; Dwayne Carter; Jay Jenkins; Noel Fisher
- Producers: Akon; Detail

Akon singles chronology
"Right Now (Na Na Na)" (2008)	"I'm So Paid" (2008)	"Holla Holla" (2008)

Lil Wayne singles chronology
"Mrs. Officer" (2008)	"I'm So Paid" (2008)	"All My Life (In the Ghetto)" (2008)

Young Jeezy singles chronology
"Vacation" (2008)	"I'm So Paid" (2008)	"Crazy World" (2008)

Music video
- "I'm So Paid" on YouTube

"I'm So Paid" is a song by Senegalese-American singer Akon from his third studio album, Freedom. The song features additional vocals from rappers Lil Wayne and Young Jeezy, and was released as a digital download worldwide and a physical single in France only on October 4, 2008.

== Composition ==
The song is in the key of F♯ major. In his opening verse, Akon mentions Jamaican Olympic Athlete Usain Bolt due to the sprinter's love of his music. Fellow Olympian Michael Phelps is referenced in Young Jeezy's verse.

== Music video ==
A music video for the track was filmed in September 2008 in Miami. Akon said that it would be a James Bond kind of video. The video features Lil Wayne and Young Jeezy, and was directed by Gil Green. DJ Khaled and T-Pain are featured as a cameo. Konvict Muzik artists Kardinal Offishall, Billy Blue, Tami Chynn, Bu Thiam, and Cash Money artist Lil Chuckee were also featured in a cameo. The video was released on October 30, 2008. Clothing brand Coogi underwrote the entire $1-million production cost for the video. The music video begins with Akon entering a yacht off a helicopter, giving the female dealer (Tami Chynn) a diamond in exchange for money. As Akon and another woman leave, the dealer discovers the jewelry gone, and asks her assistants to get them. Akon and the woman escape by boat and car. As Akon parked the car, he gave the money to the girl in exchange for the diamond. The girl later discovers that the money is fake.

== Track listing ==
- French CD single
1. "I'm So Paid" (Feat. Lil Wayne & Young Jeezy) – 4:23
2. "I'm So Paid" (Feat. Lil Wayne) (No Rap) – 3:22

== Charts ==
=== Weekly charts ===
Weekly chart performance for "I'm So Paid"
Chart (2008–2009)	Peak position
Australia (ARIA)	91
Canada Hot 100 (Billboard)	41
European Hot 100 Singles (Billboard)	53
France (SNEP)	15
Slovakia Airplay (ČNS IFPI)	86
Sweden (Sverigetopplistan)	21
UK Singles (Official Charts)	59
US Billboard Hot 100	31
US Hot R&B/Hip-Hop Songs (Billboard)	47
US Rhythmic Airplay (Billboard)	18

=== Year-end charts ===
Year-end chart performance for "I'm So Paid"
Chart (2009)	Position
Brazil (Crowley)	73
France (SNEP)	69

== Certifications ==
Certifications for "I'm So Paid"
Region	Certification	Certified units/sales
Brazil (Pro-Música Brasil)	Platinum	60,000^{‡}
New Zealand (RMNZ)	Gold	15,000^{‡}
United Kingdom (BPI)	Silver	200,000^{‡}
United States (RIAA)	Platinum	1,000,000^{*}
^{*} Sales figures based on certification alone.^{‡} Sales+streaming figures based on certification alone.
