= Freedom (Akon album) =

2008 Studio album by Akon

Studio album by Akon
- Released: December 1, 2008
- Recorded: 2008
- Genre: Pop
- Length: 55:21
- Labels: Konvict; UpFront; SRC; Universal Motown
- Producers: Akon; Noel "Detail" Fisher; Giorgio Tuinfort; Eddie O; Jaylien Wesley; RedOne; T-Pain; Timothy Walls; JAYLIEN

Akon chronology
Konvicted (2006)	Freedom (2008)	El Negreeto (2019)

Singles from Freedom
- 1. "Right Now (Na Na Na)" Released: September 23, 2008; 2. "I'm So Paid" Released: October 4, 2008; 3. "Beautiful" Released: January 6, 2009; 4. "We Don't Care" Released: July 6, 2009

Freedom is the third studio album by Senegalese-American singer-songwriter Akon. The album was originally named Acquitted; however, Akon changed it before it was released. It was released as a download on December 1, 2008, and in stores December 2, 2008. The album debuted at number 7 on the Billboard 200 with 110,600 copies sold in its first week.

== Recording ==
Production on the album began in May 2008 and ended in late of the same year. Originally the album was to be called Acquitted, but was later confirmed to be Freedom by Akon's label, Universal Music. Although there are some vulgarities on Freedom, it does not carry the Parental Advisory warning, making it Akon's first album not to do so. In July, a leaked recording of Akon's duet with Michael Jackson titled "Hold My Hand" was released to the Internet and at first showings of the song was supposedly taken out by Akon's music label. The song was originally posted as an Akon demo with only Akon performing the song. The leaked song was rumored to be featured on both his and Jackson's own upcoming album. In an interview with MTV, Akon was hopeful to include the song on the album. However, on October 17, Akon's label released information on the track listing and the album does not feature the duet with Jackson. The UK bonus track, "Clap Again" samples "Click Click Click" by New Kids on the Block. The leaked version of the lead single "Right Now (Na Na Na)" included verse rapper Danny Fernandes but never made the final cut; Akon decided to go solo. The tracks "Against the Grain" and "We Don't Care" were originally named "Falling in Love" and "Could You Be the Reason" respectively. "Troublemaker" seems to be a continuation of Akon's first solo #1 Billboard Hot 100 single "Don't Matter", with the lyrics suggesting that it is, as he says "Similar to the words it don't matter, but this time they wanna see us together, look at us now."

== Critical reception ==
Professional ratings
Aggregate scores
Source	Rating
Metacritic	58/100
Review scores
Source	Rating
AllMusic	3/5 stars
Entertainment Weekly	C−
The Guardian	3/5 stars
musicOMH	1/5 stars
Now	2/5 stars
The Phoenix	2/4 stars
PopMatters	5/10
Robert Christgau	(3-star Honorable Mention)
Rolling Stone	3/5 stars
Uncut	2/5 stars

Freedom has a score of 58 out of 100 from Metacritic based on "mixed or average reviews". Rolling Stone described Akon's third studio album as "melodrama about love and love lost delivered in a hooting style over synth-swamped beats." Dan LeRoy of The Hartford Courant gave a positive review to the album, stating, "Akon's undeniable gift for hooks makes this an easy listen, and the ex-con posturing isn't missed." The Boston Globe also stated, "This tuneful, seemingly effortless set of sun-kissed pop reminds you why he's in so much demand." 411mania gave the album a score of eight out of ten and said, "This CD is great for the clubs and perhaps for driving down the road trying to find something to put in your cars, but the lyrics are your basic run-of-the-mill crunk song lyrics and leave you a little empty. The one thing I can say for Akon is that he has a pretty decent voice, he's got a great look, and he's got great promoters." Entertainment Weekly gave the album a C−, stating, "Akon's philosophy of liberty also includes the freedom to reuse nearly identical hooks for 13 songs straight." musicOMH gave the album one star out of five and stated, "Unfortunately, all this really means is an extra emphasis on weirdly pitched keyboard riffs and slightly dated sounding beats," and also stated "The album opens with its two best songs, which is never a good idea when there are twelve still to get through." The New York Times critic Jon Caramanica described the track Holla Holla, featuring T-Pain, "is the first of theirs (song) in which the student clearly bests the mentor." Meanwhile, following the album's UK release, noted writer Pete Lewis of the award-winning Blues & Soul stated: "With his new album's typically-expansive moods ranging from banging ghetto jams like 'I'm So Paid' and sexual, T-Pain-featuring 'Holla Holla', to uplifting universal anthems like the autobiographical title-track and reggae-infused 'Sunny Day', hopes are high this time round for 'Freedom' to even eclipse Akon's already-amazing past international success."

== Commercial performance ==
Freedom debuted at number seven on the US Billboard 200, selling 111,000 copies in its first week. As of July 2011, it has sold 782,000 copies in the US.

== Singles ==
The first single released from the album, "Right Now (Na Na Na)", which peaked at #8 on the Billboard Hot 100 was Akon's 12th top 10 hit on the chart. The second single is "I'm So Paid", featuring Lil Wayne and Young Jeezy. The single made a "Hot Shot Debut" at #40 on the Billboard Hot 100 and fell off the charts after a few weeks, but then re-entered and peaked at #31. "Beautiful", the third single, debuted and peaked at #19 on the Billboard Hot 100. The fourth single from the album was "We Don't Care", The music video surfaced online on June 16. The songs "Troublemaker" featuring Sweet Rush and "Keep You Much Longer" peaked at #97 and #123 respectively on the Billboard Hot 100 based solely on iTunes downloads following the album's release without single releases.

== Track listing ==
No.	Title	Writer(s)	Producer(s)	Length
1.	"Right Now (Na Na Na)"	Aliaune Thiam	Akon; Tuinfort^{[a]}	4:01
2.	"Beautiful" (featuring Colby O'Donis and Kardinal Offishall)	Thiam; Jaylien Wesley; Colby O’Donis Colón; Jason Harrow	Akon; Jaylien^{[a]}	5:13
3.	"Keep You Much Longer"	Akon; Tuinfort; Mark "Exit" Goodchild	Akon; Tuinfort^{[a]}	4:21
4.	"Troublemaker" (featuring Sweet Rush)	Thiam; Timothy Walls	Akon; K-Figz^{[a]}	3:57
5.	"We Don't Care"	Thiam; Tuinfort; Claude Kelly	Akon; Tuinfort^{[a]}	4:16
6.	"I'm So Paid" (featuring Lil Wayne and Young Jeezy)	Thiam; Noel Fisher; Dwayne Carter, Jr.; Jay Jenkins	Akon; Detail	4:24
7.	"Holla Holla" (featuring T-Pain)	Thiam; Faheem Najm; Frank Romano; David "Preach" Balfour	Akon; T-Pain; Romano^{[b]}	3:00
8.	"Against the Grain" (featuring Ray Lavender)	Thiam; Nadir Khayat; E. Lavender	Akon; RedOne^{[a]}	4:04
9.	"Be with You"	Thiam; Hakim Abdulsamad	Akon; Abdulsamad^{[a]}	3:51
10.	"Sunny Day" (featuring Wyclef Jean)	Thiam; Khayat; Lamont Coleman; Neluset Jean	Akon; RedOne^{[a]}; LoGiC^{[b]}	5:13
11.	"Birthmark"	Thiam; Tuinfort; Fisher	Akon; Tuinfort^{[a]}; Detail^{[b]}	4:23
12.	"Over the Edge"	Thiam; Tuinfort; Kelly	Akon; Tuinfort^{[a]}	4:27
13.	"Freedom"	Thiam; Tuinfort; Fisher	Akon; Tuinfort^{[a]}	4:15
Total length:				55:21

Digital bonus track
No.	Title	Writer(s)	Producer(s)	Length
14.	"I'm So Paid" (featuring Lil Wayne)	Thiam; Fisher; Carter, Jr.	Akon; Detail	3:22

UK & Australia bonus track
No.	Title	Writer(s)	Producer(s)	Length
14.	"Clap Again"	Thiam; Abdulsamad	Akon; Abdulsamad^{[a]}	5:11

Chinese bonus track
No.	Title	Writer(s)	Producer(s)	Length
14.	"Be with You" (Mandarin version; featuring Wilber)	Thiam; Abdulsamad	Akon; Abdulsamad^{[a]}	4:34

Brazilian bonus tracks
No.	Title	Writer(s)	Producer(s)	Length
14.	"Beautiful" (featuring Negra Li)		Akon; Jaylien 2010^{[a]}	3:53
15.	"Clap Again"	Thiam; Abdulsamad	Akon; Abdulsamad^{[a]}	5:11

Tour edition bonus tracks
No.	Title	Writer(s)	Producer(s)	Length
14.	"Be with You" (Mandarin version; featuring Will Pan)	Thiam; Abdulsamad	Akon; Abdulsamad^{[a]}	3:51
15.	"Beautiful" (Reggae Remix; featuring Colby O'Donis and Kardinal Offishall)	Thiam; Wesley; Colón; Harrow	Akon; Wesley^{[a]}; Damian "Jr. Gong" Marley^{[a]}; Stephen Marley^{[b]}	5:13
16.	"Sexy Bitch" (featuring David Guetta)	Akon, J. Wesley, David Guetta	David Guetta, Jean-Claude Sindres*, Sandy Vee*	3:47

Tour edition bonus DVD
No.	Title	Director(s)	Length
1.	"Right Now (Na Na Na)" (video)	Hattem Abu Sitta	4:01
2.	"I'm So Paid" (video)	Gil Green	4:24
3.	"Beautiful" (video)	Gil Green	5:13
4.	"We Don't Care" (video)	Gil Green	4:16
5.	"Home Grown – Webisode"
6.	"Be with You" (Mandarin version featuring Will Pan; video)		3:51

- ^{^[a]} signifies a co-producer
- ^{^[b]} signifies an additional producer

== Charts ==
=== Weekly charts ===
Chart (2008–09)	Peak position
Australian Albums (ARIA)	20
Australian Urban Albums (ARIA)	3
Austrian Albums (Ö3 Austria)	75
Belgian Albums (Ultratop Flanders)	12
Belgian Albums (Ultratop Wallonia)	40
Canadian Albums (Billboard)	4
Dutch Albums (Album Top 100)	75
French Albums (SNEP)	9
German Albums (Offizielle Top 100)	82
Hungarian Albums (MAHASZ)	20
Greek Albums Chart	27
Irish Albums (IRMA)	24
Japanese Albums (Oricon)	20
Mexican Albums (Top 100 Mexico)	76
New Zealand Albums (RMNZ)	29
Polish Albums Charts	31
Scottish Albums (Official Charts)	9
Swiss Albums (Schweizer Hitparade)	22
UK Albums (Official Charts)	6
UK R&B Albums (Official Charts)	1
US Billboard 200	7
US Top R&B/Hip-Hop Albums (Billboard)	3

Chart (2026)	Peak position
German Hip-Hop Albums (Offizielle Top 100)	19

=== Year-end charts ===
Chart (2008)	Position
UK Albums (OCC)	150

Chart (2009)	Position
Australian Albums (ARIA)	68
Belgian Albums (Ultratop Flanders)	58
Canadian Albums (Billboard)	24
French Albums (SNEP)	95
Swiss Albums (Schweizer Hitparade)	85
UK Albums (OCC)	39
US Billboard 200	42
US Top R&B/Hip-Hop Albums (Billboard)	23

== Certifications ==
Region	Certification	Certified units/sales
Australia (ARIA)	Gold	35,000^{^}
Canada (Music Canada)	Platinum	80,000^{^}
Denmark (IFPI Danmark)	Platinum	20,000^{‡}
GCC (IFPI Middle East)	2× Platinum	12,000^{*}
Lebanon (IFPI Middle East)	Gold	1,000
New Zealand (RMNZ)	Platinum	15,000^{‡}
Singapore (RIAS)	Gold	5,000^{*}
United Kingdom (BPI)	2× Platinum	600,000^{‡}
^{*} Sales figures based on certification alone.^{^} Shipments figures based on certification alone.^{‡} Sales+streaming figures based on certification alone.
