= Troublemaker (Akon song) =

Promotional single by Akon featuring Sweet Rush (Faarrow)

from the album Freedom
- Released: December 13, 2008
- Genre: R&B, dance-pop, electropop
- Length: 3:57
- Label: Konvict Muzik/Universal Motown
- Songwriters: A. Thiam, J. Jenkins
- Producer: Akon

"Troublemaker" is the second of three promotional singles from Akon's third studio album, Freedom. The track features additional vocals from Sweet Rush. It was released as a digital download only single via iTunes on December 13, 2008. The track debuted at No. 97 on the U.S. Billboard Hot 100 and No. 65 on the Canadian Hot 100 on the chart week of November 29, 2008.

== Track listing ==
1. "Troublemaker" (featuring Sweet Rush) – 3:57

== Charts ==
Chart (2008–09)	Peak position
Canada Hot 100 (Billboard)	65
US Billboard Hot 100	97
