= We Don't Care (Akon song) =

Single by Akon

from the album Freedom
- Released: July 6, 2009
- Recorded: 2008
- Genre: Dance-pop
- Length: 4:16
- Label: Konvict Muzik; Universal Motown
- Songwriters: Akon; Giorgio Tuinfort; Claude Kelly
- Producers: A. Thiam; Arrowstar

Akon singles chronology
"All Up 2 You" (2009)	"We Don't Care" (2009)	"Sexy Bitch" (2009)

"We Don't Care" is the fourth single from Akon's third studio album, Freedom. The single was released as a digital download in the United Kingdom on July 6, 2009. The single reached the B-list on BBC Radio 1.

== Video ==
The video for the song was released to YouTube on June 22, 2009. The video features both live performance footage and backstage footage from Akon's Konvicted Tour.

== Track listing ==
Digital download

1. "We Don't Care" (video version) – 3:53

Promotional CD single

1. "We Don't Care" (radio edit) – 3:20
2. "We Don't Care" (album version) – 4:16

== Charts ==
The track peaked at number 61 on the UK Singles Chart. The song also peaked at number 35 on the UK R&B Chart.

Chart (2009)	Peak position
Australia (ARIA)	91
Czech Republic Airplay (ČNS IFPI)	90
United Kingdom (Official Charts Company)	61
UK R&B Chart	35

Chart (2026)	Peak position
Austria (Ö3 Austria Top 40)	68
Germany (GfK)	74
Slovakia Singles Digital (ČNS IFPI)	98
Switzerland (Schweizer Hitparade)	83

== Release history ==
Country	Date	Format	Label
United Kingdom	July 2, 2009	Digital download	Konvict Muzik, SRC Records, Universal Motown
