= Right Now (Na Na Na) =

2008 single by Akon

Single by Akon

from the album Freedom
- Released: September 23, 2008
- Length: 4:01; 3:24 (UK radio edit)
- Label: Konvict Muzik; Universal Motown
- Songwriter: A. Thiam
- Producers: Akon; Giorgio Tuinfort (co.)

Akon singles chronology
"Wake It Up" (2008)	"Right Now (Na Na Na)" (2008)	"I'm So Paid" (2008)

Music video
- "Right Now (Na Na Na)" on YouTube

"Right Now (Na Na Na)" is a song by Senegalese-American singer-songwriter Akon. It is the lead single from his third studio album, Freedom. The song contains elements from "Remember" by Summer Love. The song was added to the U.S. Mainstream Top 40 radio airing on September 23, 2008, and also became available for digital download on iTunes that day. The song was intended to have a Euro-club feel.

Right Now (Na Na Na) peaked at number eight on the Billboard Hot 100 and is currently Akon's last top 10 hit as a solo artist.

== History ==
In 2009, Dutch producers Maurice Huismans and Jorrit ter Braak started a lawsuit against Akon and his co-writer Giorgio Tuinfort, claiming that "Right Now" stole from an earlier song of theirs, "Remember" by the act Summer Love which was a hit in Europe in 2001 and later covered by the Underdog Project and Spanish singer David Tavare as the song "Summerlove".

In 2010, the Dutch plagiarism committee approved this claim and all parties settled afterwards.

== Official versions ==
Several remixes of the track exist. The official remix of the track features additional vocals by Kat DeLuna. Further remixes include "Mañana (Na Na Na)", featuring vocals from Jayko, and an International Remix, featuring Canadian singer Danny Fernandes.

== Music video ==
The official music video for the track was directed by Anthony Mandler and released on November 6, 2008. It premiered in Germany on the TV show Viva Live. In the video, Akon plays an agent that is on a mission, he has to find a girl (the same from his video "Don't Matter") that has secret information. He remembers the good times that he spent with his ex-girlfriend, played by Jamaican model Cindy Wright, but he sleeps with the girl from "Don't Matter", gets the information and ends the video alone. The actual track begins one minute after the video begins, making the video over 5 minutes in length. As of February 2025, the video has over 1 billion views on YouTube.

== Charts ==
=== Weekly charts ===
Chart (2008–2009)	Peak position
Australia (ARIA)	17
Austria (Ö3 Austria Top 40)	38
Belgium (Ultratop 50 Flanders)	7
Belgium (Ultratop 50 Wallonia)	3
Canada Hot 100 (Billboard)	7
CIS Airplay (TopHit)	6
Czech Republic Airplay (ČNS IFPI)	4
Denmark (Tracklisten)	14
Europe (European Hot 100 Singles)	9
Finland (Suomen virallinen lista)	15
France (SNEP)	8
Germany (GfK)	44
Hungary (Rádiós Top 40)	7
Ireland (IRMA)	18
Italy (FIMI)	35
Israel International Airplay (Media Forest)	5
Netherlands (Dutch Top 40)	21
Netherlands (Single Top 100)	30
New Zealand (Recorded Music NZ)	5
Russia Airplay (TopHit)	10
Scotland Singles (OCC)	22
Slovakia Airplay (ČNS IFPI)	9
Sweden (Sverigetopplistan)	48
Switzerland (Schweizer Hitparade)	15
UK Singles (OCC)	6
UK Hip Hop/R&B (OCC)	3
US Billboard Hot 100	8
US Hot R&B/Hip-Hop Songs (Billboard)	73
US Pop Airplay (Billboard)	9
US Rhythmic Airplay (Billboard)	3
Venezuela Pop Rock (Record Report)	4

Chart (2025)	Peak position
Moldova Airplay (TopHit)	50

=== Year-end charts ===
Chart (2008)	Position
CIS (TopHit)	130
France (SNEP)	60
Russia Airplay (TopHit)	120
UK Singles (OCC)	59

Chart (2009)	Position
Australia (ARIA)	82
Belgium (Ultratop 50 Flanders)	35
Belgium (Ultratop 50 Wallonia)	23
Brazil (Crowley)	45
Canada (Canadian Hot 100)	54
France (SNEP)	70
Hungary (Rádiós Top 40)	27
Russia Airplay (TopHit)	134
Switzerland (Schweizer Hitparade)	77
UK Singles (OCC)	117
US Billboard Hot 100	56
US Rhythmic (Billboard)	31

== Certifications ==
Region	Certification	Certified units/sales
Australia (ARIA)	4× Platinum	280,000^{‡}
Brazil (Pro-Música Brasil)	Diamond	250,000^{‡}
Denmark (IFPI Danmark)	Platinum	90,000^{‡}
New Zealand (RMNZ)	2× Platinum	60,000^{‡}
United Kingdom (BPI)	Platinum	600,000^{‡}
United States (RIAA)	2× Platinum	2,000,000^{*}
United States (RIAA) Mastertone	Platinum	1,000,000^{*}
^{*} Sales figures based on certification alone.^{‡} Sales+streaming figures based on certification alone.

== Asking Alexandria cover ==
"Right Now (Na Na Na)"

Single by Asking Alexandria

from the album Punk Goes Pop 3
- Released: September 29, 2010
- Recorded: 2010
- Genre: Electronicore
- Length: 4:20
- Label: Sumerian Records, distributed through Fearless Records
- Songwriter: A. Thiam

Asking Alexandria singles chronology
"Final Episode (Let's Change the Channel)" (2009)	"Right Now (Na Na Na)" (2010)	"A Prophecy" (2010)

British rock band Asking Alexandria covered the track for the compilation album Punk Goes Pop 3, which was released on November 2, 2010. It was available for digital download on September 29, 2010.

== Other versions ==
A Tagalog parody version, entitled "Banana (Ba Na Na)", was recorded by Filipino rapper Blank Tape. In 2010, Rucka Rucka Ali parodied the song entitled "I Wanna Blow Up China (Na Na)". A Malaysian parody or remake was performed by Kelantanese singers Man Khan and Rosalinda, entitled "Dok Mano" released at the near end of 2012 sung in the Kelantanese dialect of the Malaysian language.

Olivia O'Brien sampled this song on her single "Now". Released on September 18, 2020. O’Brien’s lyrics juxtaposes Akon’s from the female’s point of view.

A UIA cat version of the song, entitled Right Now (UIIAA), posted onto TikTok account @Doombreaker03 on December 17, 2024, in which Ethel (OIIAOIIA cat) sings Right Now (Na Na Na), the lyrics replaced "Up right now na na, i wanna make" with UIIAA, UAUI.

In 2025, Akon collaborated with Canadian country music artist Josh Ross on the song "Drunk Right Now (Na Na Na)," which incorporated elements of "Right Now (Na Na Na)".
