= Sorry, Blame It on Me =

2007 single by Akon

Single by Akon

from the album Konvicted [Complete Edition]
- Released: July 17, 2007
- Genre: R&B
- Length: 4:55
- Label: Konvict Muzik, Motown Records, Interscope
- Songwriters: Aliaune Thiam, Clinton Sparks
- Producer: Clinton Sparks

Akon singles chronology
"9mm" (2007)	"Sorry, Blame It on Me" (2007)	"Sweetest Girl (Dollar Bill)" (2007)

Music video
- Sorry, Blame It on Me on YouTube

"Sorry, Blame It on Me" is the fifth single from R&B singer/songwriter Akon's second studio album, Konvicted.

The song was co-written and produced by Clinton Sparks. This song was made after the nightclub incident in which Akon did a sexual dance with an underage girl. A demo of the song was leaked in February 2007, several months before the official version became available on Akon's Myspace. The song was put on iTunes on July 17, 2007. The song attained the number one position on iTunes on July 21, 2007, and July 23, 2007. The song was released to radio on July 24, 2007. The song debuted on the August 4, 2007 issue of the Billboard Hot 100 at number seven. A music video directed by Chris Robinson was produced to promote the single.

== Track listing ==
1. "Sorry, Blame It on Me" - 4:57

== Charts ==
=== Weekly charts ===
Chart (2007–2008)	Peak position
Australia (ARIA)	27
Canada Hot 100 (Billboard)	17
Czech Republic Airplay (ČNS IFPI)	11
Denmark (Tracklisten)	16
Europe (Eurochart Hot 100)	17
France (SNEP)	10
Hungary (Rádiós Top 40)	15
Hungary (Dance Top 40)	28
Ireland (IRMA)	9
Netherlands (Dutch Top 40 Tipparade)	4
Netherlands (Single Top 100)	34
Romania (Romanian Top 100)	8
New Zealand (Recorded Music NZ)	2
Scottish Singles Sales (Official Charts)	23
Slovakia Airplay (ČNS IFPI)	39
Sweden (Sverigetopplistan)	6
Switzerland (Schweizer Hitparade)	46
UK Singles (Official Charts)	22
UK Hip Hop/R&B (Official Charts)	5
US Billboard Hot 100	7
US Pop Airplay (Billboard)	37
US Rhythmic Airplay (Billboard)	11

=== Year-end charts ===
Chart (2007)	Position
Brazil (Crowley)	33
New Zealand (RIANZ)	47
Sweden (Sverigetopplistan)	67

Chart (2008)	Position
Brazil (Crowley)	65
Hungary (Rádiós Top 40)	66

== Certifications ==
Region	Certification	Certified units/sales
Brazil (Pro-Música Brasil) DMS	Platinum	60,000^{*}
Brazil (Pro-Música Brasil)	Diamond	250,000^{‡}
Denmark (IFPI Danmark)	Gold	7,500^{^}
New Zealand (RMNZ)	Platinum	30,000^{‡}
Sweden (GLF)	Gold	10,000^{^}
United Kingdom (BPI)	Gold	400,000^{‡}
United States (RIAA)	Platinum	1,000,000^{*}
^{*} Sales figures based on certification alone.^{^} Shipments figures based on certification alone.^{‡} Sales+streaming figures based on certification alone.
