= Pot of Gold (Akon song) =

Single by Akon

from the album Trouble
- Released: November 15, 2005
- Recorded: 2004
- Genre: R&B; soul; conscious hip hop; world
- Length: 3:23
- Label: SRC, Universal
- Songwriters: Aliaune "Akon" Thiam, Shakim Williams
- Producer: Shakim Williams

Akon singles chronology
"Soul Survivor" (2005)	"Pot of Gold" (2005)	"Snitch" (2006)

Music video
- "Pot of Gold" on YouTube

"Pot of Gold" is the fifth and final single from Senegalese singer-songwriter Akon's debut studio album, Trouble. Released as a European-only single, the song failed to chart significantly anywhere, peaking at number 77 in the United Kingdom and at number 95 in Germany. The single was not released in the United States, making it Akon's only single to date not to be. A music video for the track, directed by Gil Green, was released to Akon's YouTube account on October 24, 2005. Two versions of the video were filmed: a clean version, and an explicit version, which has never been broadcast on television.

== Track listing ==
UK CD1

1. "Pot of Gold" (Radio Edit) - 3:23
2. "Belly Dancer (Bananza)" (Remix) (Feat. Kardinal Offishall) - 3:27

UK CD2

1. "Pot of Gold" (Radio Edit) - 3:23
2. "Lonely" (AOL Sessions Live) - 3:41
3. "Locked Up" (AOL Sessions Live) - 2:58

== Charts ==
Chart (2005)	Peak position
Germany (GfK)	95
Ireland (IRMA)	33
UK Singles (Official Charts)	77
UK Hip Hop/R&B (Official Charts)	11
