= Snitch (song) =

Single by Obie Trice featuring Akon

from the album Second Round's on Me
- Released: March 26, 2006
- Recorded: 2005
- Genre: Hip hop; gangsta rap
- Length: 4:01
- Label: Shady; Interscope
- Songwriter(s): Obie Trice; Aliaune Thiam
- Producer(s): Akon

Obie Trice singles chronology
"Wanna Know" (2005)	"Snitch" (2006)	"Cry Now" (2006)

Akon singles chronology
"Pot of Gold" (2005)	"Snitch" (2006)	"I Am Not My Hair (Konvict Remix)" (2006)

"Snitch" is a song by American rapper Obie Trice, released as the first single from his second studio album Second Round's on Me (2006). The song features guest vocals from American singer Akon, who also produced the song and helped to write it along with Trice.

== Critical reception ==
"Snitch" received generally positive reviews from music critics. Henry Adaso of About.com called "Snitch" a "potent single" and complimented the musical growth shown by Trice on the song, noted that it "signal[s] Trice's transition from the cartoonish Slim Shady accomplice that once underwhelmed... to a sole survivor." However, in his review for Stylus Magazine, Jonathan Bradley called "Snitch" "an enjoyable but inessential track": he also felt it to be unoriginal, writing that it "sounds like every other Akon guest appearance on the market" and that Trice was "poorly served by hooking up with the hot guests of the moment".

== Track listing ==
Vinyl, 12", 33 ⅓ RPM

Side A
No.	Title	Writer(s)	Producer(s)	Length
1.	"Snitch" (clean)	Obie Trice; Aliaune Thiam	Akon	3:58
2.	"Snitch" (dirty)	Trice; Thiam	Akon	3:58
3.	"Snitch" (instrumental)	Trice; Thiam	Akon	3:59
4.	"Snitch" (acappella)	Trice; Thiam	Akon	3:58
Total length:				15:53

Side B
No.	Title	Writer(s)	Producer(s)	Length
1.	"Snitch" (clean)	Obie Trice; Aliaune Thiam	Akon	3:58
2.	"Snitch" (dirty)	Trice; Thiam	Akon	3:58
3.	"Snitch" (instrumental)	Trice; Thiam	Akon	3:59
4.	"Snitch" (acappella)	Trice; Thiam	Akon	3:58
Total length:				15:53

CD

Side B
No.	Title	Writer(s)	Producer(s)	Length
1.	"Snitch" (clean)	Obie Trice; Aliaune Thiam	Akon	3:58
2.	"Snitch" (instrumental)	Trice; Thiam	Akon	3:59
Total length:				7:57

== Charts ==
Chart (2006)	Peak position
Australia (ARIA)	39
France (SNEP)	58
Ireland (IRMA)	44
Sweden (Sverigetopplistan)	37
UK Singles (OCC)	44
US Bubbling Under R&B/Hip-Hop Singles (Billboard)	11

== Radio and release history ==
Country	Date	Format	Label
United States	March 28, 2006	Digital download	Interscope Records
United States	April 17, 2006	Urban contemporary radio	Interscope Records
United Kingdom	July 1, 2006	Digital EP	Interscope Records
United Kingdom	September 4, 2006	Digital download	Interscope Records
