= Beautiful (Akon song) =

2009 single by Akon

Single by Akon featuring Colby O'Donis and Kardinal Offishall

from the album Freedom
- Released: January 6, 2009
- Recorded: 2008
- Genre: Dance-pop
- Length: 5:12 (album version); 3:51 (radio edit); 3:19 (UK radio edit)
- Label: Konvict Muzik; Universal Motown
- Songwriters: Colby Colón; Jason Harrow; Akon; Jaylien Wesley; Giorgio Tuinfort
- Producers: Akon; Jaylien 3005

Akon singles chronology
"What's Love" (2008)	"Beautiful" (2009)	"Day Dreaming" (2009)

Colby O'Donis singles chronology
"Don't Turn Back" (2008)	"Beautiful" (2009)	"I Go Crazy" (2009)

Kardinal Offishall singles chronology
"Numba 1 (Tide Is High)" (2008)	"Beautiful" (2009)	"Put Your Drinks Up" (2009)

Music video
- "Beautiful" on YouTube

Beautiful (Brazilian edition) by Akon featuring Negra Li

Beautiful (Mexican edition) by Akon featuring Dulce María

Negra Li singles chronology
"Ainda Gosto Dela" (2008)	"Beautiful" (2009)	"Tudo de Novo" (2012)

Dulce María singles chronology
"El Regalo Más Grande" (2009)	"Beautiful" (2009)	"Verano" (2009)

"Beautiful" is a song by Senegalese-American singer Akon, released on January 6, 2009 as the third single from his third studio album, Freedom. It features American pop singer Colby O'Donis and Canadian rapper Kardinal Offishall. The song has also been released in other three international versions, with different featured artists replacing both Colby's vocals and Kardinal's rapping: in Portuguese with Brazilian singer Negra Li, in Dutch with Dutch singer Brace, and in Spanish with Mexican singer Dulce María. The original version of "Beautiful" peaked at number nineteen on the Billboard Hot 100, and peaked within the top ten of the charts in Israel and the United Kingdom. The video also features cameos from Tyrese Gibson and A. R. Rahman.

== Different versions ==
The song has also been recorded in three international versions: in Portuguese, with Brazilian singer and actress Negra Li, in Dutch, with Dutch singer Brace, and in Spanish, with Mexican singer/actress/songwriter Dulce María. The rap from the original was removed, and Colby O'Donis' vocals were also removed in favor of the other singers.

The Spanish version was first performed in an event at Mexico, on April 1, 2009. On the next day, it was leaked for airing and on the internet. The Portuguese version was leaked two days before.

The music videos in Portuguese, Dutch and Spanish were released at YouTube on June 2, 8 and 9, respectively.

== Track listing ==
UK and Europe CD single

1. "Beautiful" (featuring Colby O'Donis and Kardinal Offishall) - 5:13
2. "I'm So Paid" (featuring Lil Wayne and Young Jeezy) - 4:29

Brazil CD single

1. "Beautiful" (featuring Negra Li) - 4:07
2. "Beautiful" (featuring Negra Li) [Dance Mix] - 4:01

Mexico CD single

1. "Beautiful" (featuring Dulce Maria) - 4:06

Korea CD single

1. "Beautiful" (featuring BoA) - 4:06

== Charts ==
=== Weekly charts ===
Chart (2009)	Peak position
Australia (ARIA)	14
Austria (Ö3 Austria Top 40)	42
Belgium (Ultratop 50 Flanders)	38
Belgium (Ultratip Bubbling Under Wallonia)	3
Bulgaria (BAMP)	5
Canada Hot 100 (Billboard)	16
Czech Republic Airplay (ČNS IFPI)	18
European Hot 100 Singles (Billboard)	29
Germany (GfK)	34
Hungary (Rádiós Top 40)	2
Ireland (IRMA)	13
Israel International Airplay (Media Forest)	7
Mexico (Monitor Latino Anglo); Remix featuring Dulce María	3
Netherlands (Dutch Top 40)	12
Netherlands (Single Top 100)	24
New Zealand (Recorded Music NZ)	13
Norway (VG-lista)	16
Romania Airplay (Media Forest)	9
Russia Airplay (TopHit)	10
Scottish Singles Sales (Official Charts)	16
Slovakia Airplay (ČNS IFPI)	22
Sweden (Sverigetopplistan)	28
Switzerland (Schweizer Hitparade)	34
UK Singles (Official Charts)	8
UK Hip Hop/R&B (Official Charts)	3
US Billboard Hot 100	19
US Pop Airplay (Billboard)	11
US Hot R&B/Hip-Hop Songs (Billboard)	61
US Dance Club Songs (Billboard)	5
US Rhythmic Airplay (Billboard)	4

=== Monthly charts ===
Chart (2009)	Position
Brazil (Brasil Hot 100 Airplay); Original version	76
Brazil (Brasil Hot 100 Airplay); Remix featuring Negra Li	19

=== Year-end charts ===
Chart (2009)	Position
Australia (ARIA)	65
Canada (Canadian Hot 100)	45
Costa Rica (Monitec); Remix featuring Dulce María	28
Costa Rica (Monitec Anglosajón); Remix featuring Dulce María	6
Hungary (Rádiós Top 40)	11
Netherlands (Dutch Top 40)	88
New Zealand (Recorded Music NZ)	46
Russia Airplay (TopHit)	106
Sweden (Sverigetopplistan)	96
UK Singles (Official Charts Company)	49
US Billboard Hot 100	54
US Rhythmic (Billboard)	29

== Certifications ==
Region	Certification	Certified units/sales
Australia (ARIA)	3× Platinum	210,000^{‡}
Brazil (Pro-Música Brasil)	2× Platinum	120,000^{‡}
Denmark (IFPI Danmark)	Gold	45,000^{‡}
New Zealand (RMNZ)	2× Platinum	60,000^{‡}
United Kingdom (BPI)	Platinum	600,000^{‡}
United States (RIAA)	2× Platinum	2,000,000^{*}
^{*} Sales figures based on certification alone.^{‡} Sales+streaming figures based on certification alone.
