= Holla Holla (Akon song) =

Promotional single by Akon featuring T-Pain

from the album Freedom
- Released: December 2, 2008
- Genre: R&B; hip hop
- Length: 3:00
- Label: Konvict Muzik; Universal Motown
- Songwriters: A. Thiam; F. Najm; F. Romano; D Balfour
- Producer: Akon

"Holla Holla" is the first of three promotional singles from Akon's third studio album Freedom. The song features guest vocals from American singer T-Pain. The single was released as a digital download on iTunes on November 25, 2008, however, was on to the internet on November 17, 2008. The song peaked at #19 on the Bubbling Under Hot 100 Singles chart on December 1, 2008. The song was not released on any physical formats.

== Track listing ==
1. "Holla Holla" (featuring T-Pain) – 3:00

== Charts ==
Chart (2008)	Peak position
US Bubbling Under Hot 100 (Billboard)	19
