= UpFront Megatainment =

UpFront Records
- Parent company: Universal Music Group
- Founded: 2000
- Founder: DeVyne Stephens
- Distributor: Universal Music Group
- Genre: Hip hop, R&B
- Country of origin: United States
- Location: Atlanta, Georgia

UpFront Records is a record label owned and founded by DeVyne Stephens.

Stephens discovered Senegalese R&B singer Akon and signed him to his UpFront Records. Akon went on to sell over a million copies of his 2004 debut, "Trouble," and score hit singles like "Locked Up" and "Lonely."

UpFront Records' roster includes Akon, R&B quartet Red Dirt, and the rap group FA.

== Discography ==
List of studio albums, with selected chart positions, sales figures and certifications
Title	Album details	Peak chart positions										Sales	Certifications
Title	Album details	US	US R&B	AUS	CAN	GER	IRL	NZ	SWE	SWI	UK	Sales	Certifications
Trouble	Released: June 29, 2004 (US); Labels: UpFront, SRC, Universal; Formats: LP, CD, digital download	18	3	12	—	24	3	2	49	31	1	US: 1,600,000	RIAA: Platinum; ARIA: Gold; BPI: 2× Platinum; MC: Gold; RMNZ: 2× Platinum
Konvicted	Released: November 14, 2006 (US); Labels: Konvict, UpFront, SRC, Universal Motown; Formats: LP, CD, digital download	2	2	16	4	75	10	1	41	23	16	US: 2,800,000	RIAA: 6× Platinum; ARIA: Platinum; BPI: 2× Platinum; IFPI SWI: Gold; IRMA: Platinum; MC: 2× Platinum; RMNZ: 2× Platinum
Freedom	Released: December 2, 2008 (US); Labels: Konvict, UpFront, SRC, Universal Motown; Formats: LP, CD, digital download	7	3	20	4	82	10	29	—	22	6	US: 770,000	ARIA: Gold; BPI: Platinum; MC: Platinum

== See also ==
- List of record labels
