= Akon =

Senegalese-American singer (born 1973)

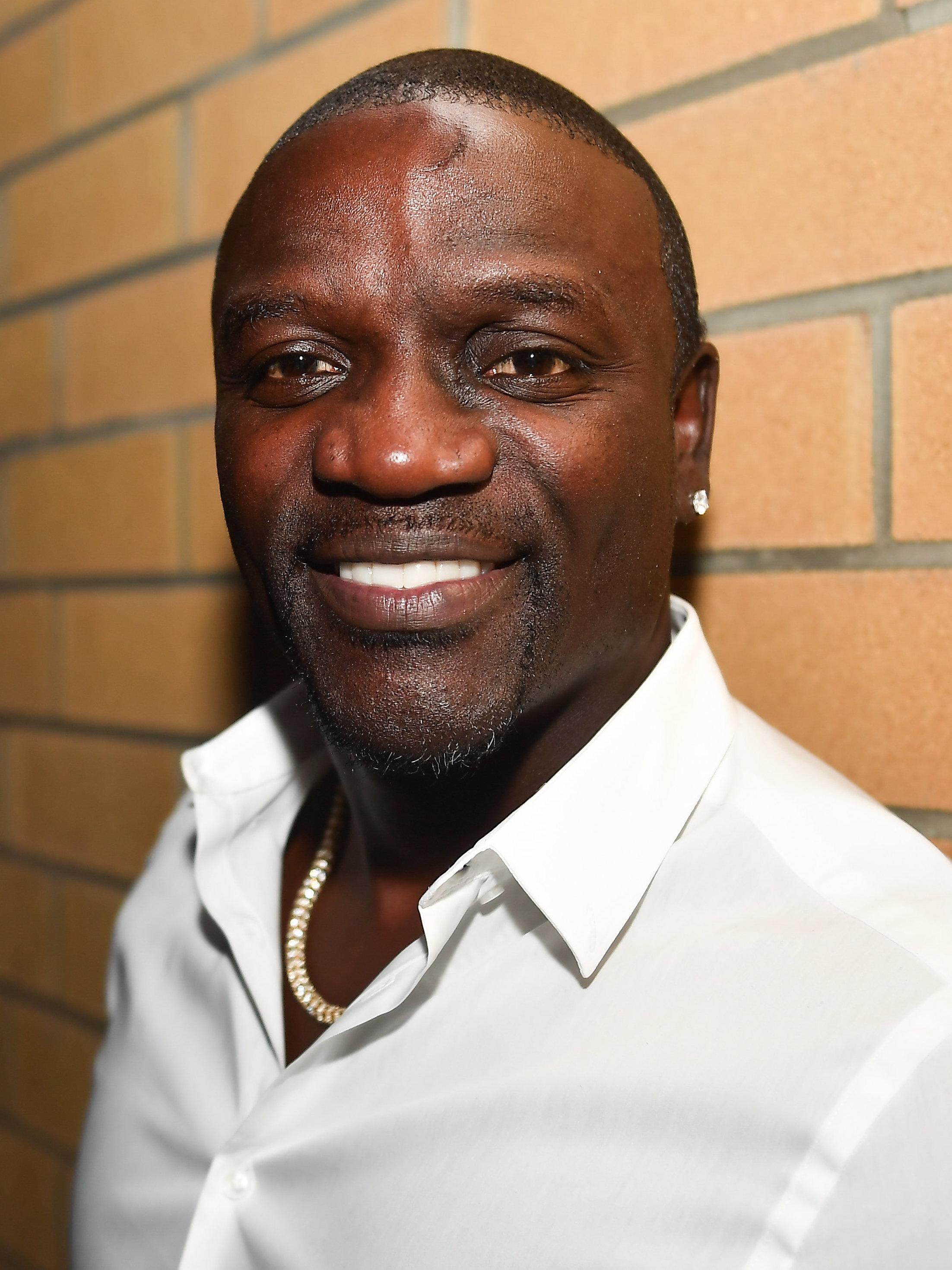
- Akon in 2019
- Born: Aliaune Damala Bouga Time Puru Nacka Lu Lu Lu Badara Akon Thiam; April 16, 1973 (age 53); St. Louis, Missouri, U.S.
- Other names: A-Kon; El Negreeto
- Occupations: Singer; songwriter; record producer; businessman; philanthropist
- Years active: 1996–present
- Organization: Akon Lighting Africa
- Works: Discography; filmography; production
- Children: 9
- Father: Mor Thiam
- Relatives: Bu Thiam (brother)
- Awards: Full list
- Musical career
- Origin: Atlanta, Georgia, U.S. Newark, New Jersey, U.S.
- Genres: R&B; hip-hop; dance-pop; Europop
- Labels: Konvict Kulture; Akonik; BMG; Atlantic; Konvict; KonLive; Republic; Universal Motown; Universal; SRC; UpFront
- Website: akon.com

Logo
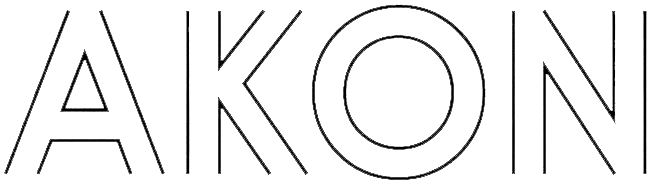

Aliaune Damala Bouga Time Puru Nacka Lu Lu Lu Badara Akon Thiam (born April 16, 1973), known professionally as Akon (/ˈeɪkɔːn/ AY-kawn), is a Senegalese-American singer, songwriter, record producer, businessman, and philanthropist. An influential figure in world music, he rose to prominence in 2004 following the release of his single "Locked Up" (featuring Styles P). Styled in hip-hop, it preceded the release of his debut studio album Trouble (2004), which became his commercial breakthrough and spawned the R&B-styled follow-up, "Lonely", the following year.

His second album, Konvicted (2006), peaked at number two on the Billboard 200 and was nominated for Best Contemporary R&B Album at the 50th Annual Grammy Awards, while its lead singles — "I Wanna Love You" (featuring Snoop Dogg) and "Smack That" (featuring Eminem) — both received nominations for Best Rap/Sung Collaboration. The songs simultaneously peaked at numbers one and two on the Billboard Hot 100, respectively, along with two of his singles released the following year: "Don't Matter" and his guest performance on Gwen Stefani's "The Sweet Escape"; this made Akon the first solo artist to concurrently hold the top two positions on the chart twice. His third album, Freedom (2008), was supported by the top ten single, "Right Now (Na Na Na)", as well as the top 40 singles "I'm So Paid" (featuring Lil Wayne and Jeezy) and "Beautiful" (featuring Colby O'Donis and Kardinal Offishall). His fourth album, El Negreeto (2019), explored reggaeton and Latin music, while his fifth album, Akonda (also 2019), explored Afrobeats; both of which failed to chart.

Along with his solo career, Akon has guest performed on 23 Billboard Hot 100 entries for other artists—such activity earned him two additional Grammy Award nominations. Akon founded the record labels Konvict Muzik in 2004 and KonLive Distribution in 2007, through which he has signed commercially successful acts including Lady Gaga, T-Pain, R. City, Kardinal Offishall, Jeffree Star and French Montana, among others. In addition, he holds a separate career in production and songwriting predominantly for artists on the labels, but also for other artists such as Michael Jackson, Snoop Dogg, Lionel Richie, Leona Lewis, Sean Paul, Whitney Houston, Mario, and Estelle, among others.

Akon's charitable and philanthropic endeavors include the non-profit Akon Lighting Africa, launched in 2014. Forbes ranked Akon 80th (Power Rank) in the Forbes Celebrity 100 in 2010 and 5th in the 40 Most Powerful Celebrities in Africa list, in 2011. Billboard ranked Akon number 6 on the list of Top Digital Songs Artists of the decade. He was listed by Guinness World Records as the number-one selling artist for master ringtones in the world, with 11 million sold by December 2007.

== Early life ==
Aliaune Damala Bouga Time Puru Nacka Lu Lu Lu Badara Akon Thiam was born on April 16, 1973, in St. Louis, Missouri, to a Muslim family. His mother is dancer Kine Gueye Thiam (née Gueye), and his father is Senegalese percussionist Mor Thiam. Mor Thiam was born to a Toucouleur family of Quranic scholars in Kaolack, Senegal, a francophone country in West Africa. Akon spent a significant part of his childhood in Senegal, which he described as his "hometown". Akon learned to play five instruments, including drums, guitar and djembe. At age seven, he and his family relocated to Union City, New Jersey, splitting his time between the United States and Senegal until settling in Newark. Growing up in New Jersey, Akon had difficulties getting along with other children. When he and his younger brother, Bu Thiam, reached high school, his parents left them on their own in Jersey City and moved the rest of the family to Atlanta, Georgia. Akon attended William L. Dickinson High School in Jersey City.

Akon has stated that he was part of an auto-theft ring and spent three years in prison from 1999 to 2002. However, in April 2008, The Smoking Gun website challenged his claim with court records and interviews with detectives involved in Akon's case, concluding that he was not convicted of any crime and did not serve time in prison. Akon responded to the report by saying that he never spent 3 consecutive years in prison, but had many shorter sentences that add up to three years. Despite his history of giving interviews claiming he is a convicted felon and at one point led a car theft ring, Akon is acknowledged to have fictionalized his criminal history, with a 1998 gun charge conviction, which resulted in him only receiving three years probation, in fact being his only criminal conviction even as of November 2025.

== Music career ==
=== 1996–2005: Discovery and Trouble ===
When still in high school, he became part of the Refugee Camp, the extended musical family of the Fugees. In 1996, he recorded a single, "Operations of Nature", that earned him a deal with Elektra Records—but when the song failed to catch on in the United States, the record deal went by the wayside as well. "That was the turning point for my music, especially the music career. That's when I lost all hope, and I was like, 'It's not really for me.' That's when I became a misfit."

Music mogul Devyne Stephens, the president of Upfront Megatainment, first heard about Akon when rapper Lil Zane brought him along to Stephens' rehearsal hall, a place that at the time saw talents such as Usher and TLC being developed. The relationship between Stephens and Akon began as a friendship and mentorship, with the young artist regularly stopping by to ask for advice, with Stephens eventually signing him to his production company and began grooming him professionally. The songs Akon recorded with Stephens were brought to the attention of Universal's imprint SRC Records. In an interview with HitQuarters SRC A&R Jerome "Knobody" Foster, he said, "What caught my attention right away was "Lonely", and I said, 'this kid is official – this is a huge record." Foster and SRC CEO Steve Rifkind immediately boarded a private plane to Atlanta to meet the young artist. Akon knew of Foster's work as producer Knobody and so there was a mutual respect for one another and the pair hit it off.

Akon's solo debut album, Trouble, was released on June 29, 2004. It spawned the singles "Locked Up", "Lonely", "Belly Dancer (Bananza)", "Pot of Gold" and "Ghetto". "Locked Up" reached the number 8 position in the US and number 5 in the UK. "Ghetto" became a radio hit when it was remixed by DJ Green Lantern to include verses from rappers 2Pac and The Notorious B.I.G. The album is a hybrid of Akon's silky, West African-styled vocals mixed with East Coast and Southern beats. Most of Akon's songs begin with the sound of the clank of a jail cell's door with him uttering the word "Konvict".

In 2005, he released the single "Lonely" (which samples Bobby Vinton's "Mr. Lonely"). The song reached the top five on the Billboard Hot 100, and topped the charts in Australia, the UK and Germany. His album also climbed to number one in the UK in April 2005. When music channel The Box had a top ten weekly chart, which was calculated by the number of video requests, Akon's "Lonely" became the longest-running single on the top of the chart, spanning over fifteen weeks. Akon was then featured on two other singles, P-Money's "Keep on Callin'" off the album Magic City, and the other with New Zealand rapper Savage with the single "Moonshine", which had become a success in both New Zealand and Australia, reaching number one on the New Zealand charts. A year later in 2005, he made his first critically acclaimed guest appearance on Young Jeezy's debut album Let's Get It: Thug Motivation 101, with the song "Soul Survivor". In December the same year, his manager Robert Montanez was killed in a shooting after a dispute in New Jersey.

In 2006, Akon and Young Jeezy suggested plans for a collaborative album.

=== 2006–2008: Konvicted ===
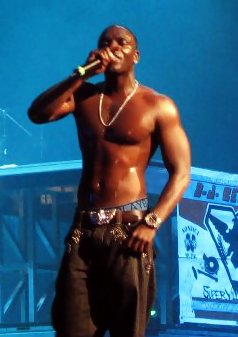
Akon performing at the Verizon Wireless Amphitheatre in Charlotte, 2007

Akon started his new record label KonLive Distribution under Interscope Records. His second album, Konvicted, was released in November 2006 and debuted at number two on the Billboard 200, selling 286,000 copies in its first week. After only six weeks, Konvicted sold more than one million records in the US. The album was certified platinum after seven weeks, and after sixteen weeks it was certified double platinum. It stayed in the top twenty of the Billboard 200 for 28 consecutive weeks and peaked at number two on four occasions. On November 20, 2007, the RIAA certified the album 'triple platinum' with 3 million units sold in the US.

The album included collaborations with Eminem, Snoop Dogg, and Styles P. The first single "Smack That" (featuring Eminem) was released in August 2006 and peaked at number two on the Billboard Hot 100 for five consecutive weeks. On October 5, 2006, Akon broke a record on the Hot 100, as he achieved the largest climb in the chart's 48-year-history with "Smack That" jumping from number 95 to 7. The leap was fueled by its number six debut on Hot Digital Songs with 67,000 downloads. The record has since been broken several times. "Smack That" was nominated for Best Rap/Sung Collaboration at the 49th Annual Grammy Awards, but lost to Justin Timberlake and T.I.'s "My Love".

"I Wanna Love You", featuring Snoop Dogg, was the second single released in September, it would go on to earn Akon his first number-one single on the Billboard Hot 100, and Snoop's second. "I Wanna Love You" topped the US charts for two consecutive weeks. In January 2007, a third single "Don't Matter" which earned him his first solo number one and second consecutive Hot 100 chart-topper was released. "Mama Africa" was released as a European single in July 2007, making it the fourth overall single from the album. To coincide with the release of the deluxe edition of the album "Sorry, Blame It on Me" debuted in August 2007 on the Hot 100 at number seven.

In February 2007, Akon launched his clothing line Konvict Clothing. It features urban streetwear including denim jeans, hoodies, T-shirts and hats. Aliaune is the upscale version, or high-end line, for males and females, which includes blazers, denim jeans and other items.

In April 2007, Akon drew criticism for an onstage act that included simulated sex with Danah Alleyne – a 15-year-old girl at the time who is the daughter of a pastor and sister of Crime Watch host Ian Alleyne – at the Zen Nightclub in Port of Spain, Trinidad and Tobago, as part of a fake contest, despite the club's statement to have a 21-years-and-over age requirement. The incident was filmed by Akon's crew and later uploaded to the Internet. On April 20, 2007, local media, channel CCN TV6, aired the video clip publicly. Amid criticism, Verizon Wireless removed ringtones featuring Akon's songs and Verizon decided not to sponsor The Sweet Escape Tour where Akon was to be the opening act for Gwen Stefani. Right wing political commentators Michelle Malkin, Laura Ingraham, and Bill O'Reilly criticized Akon for "degrading women".

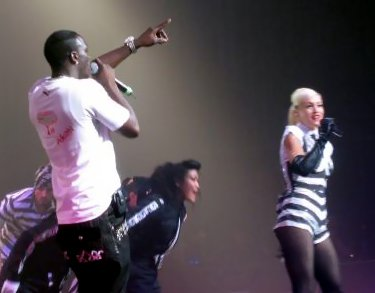
Akon performing with Gwen Stefani on The Sweet Escape Tour

He produced and featured on Gwen Stefani's "The Sweet Escape" which has reached No. 2 on the Billboard Hot 100. Akon performed at the American leg of Live Earth. He later recorded a remix of "Wanna Be Startin' Somethin'" by Michael Jackson for the 25th-anniversary rerelease of Jackson's Thriller. He also worked with bachata group Aventura and Reggaeton duo Wisin & Yandel on All Up 2 You. The song received two nominations at the Premios Lo Nuestro 2010 for "Urban Song of the Year" and "Video Collaboration of the Year". He signed Jayko, a Hispanic R&B and Reggaeton artist, to his label.

On June 3, 2007, at WSPK's KFEST concert at the Dutchess Stadium in Fishkill, New York, a concert attendee threw an object towards Akon on stage. Akon asked the crowd to identify who threw the object and that he be brought on stage. Security staff grabbed the teen and took him up to the stage. Akon then pulled him up from the crowd and hoisted him across his shoulders. The singer then tossed the attendee back into the crowd from his shoulders. Video of the incident was reviewed by Fishkill police. Akon has said that the incident was staged and that he in fact used the act to set up for the next record. On July 17 2007 Akon released a song called "Sorry, Blame It On Me" to apologize for his actions. Charges of endangering the welfare of a minor, a misdemeanor, and second-degree harassment, a violation, were filed, according to police Chief Donald F. Williams, and Akon was arraigned on the two charges on December 3, 2007, in the town of Fishkill Court. In 2008, Akon pleaded guilty to harassment. He served no jail time, provided he performed "65 hours of community service and paid a $250 fine."

=== 2008–2009: Freedom ===
Akon released his third album Freedom on December 2, 2008, which spawned four singles: "Right Now (Na Na Na)", "I'm So Paid" (featuring Lil Wayne and Young Jeezy), "Beautiful" (featuring Colby O'Donis and Kardinal Offishall) and "We Don't Care". Freedom was certified platinum in the US. Rap singer Nelly suggested that Akon, Pharrell, and T-Pain had talked about forming a rap supergroup in 2009. Akon and Konvict Muzik produced hip-hop/rock group Flipsyde's 2009 release, State of Survival, released via KonLive Distribution and Cherrytree Records. He was also the executive producer of Kardinal Offishall's fourth solo album Not 4 Sale. The first single "Dangerous", which featured Akon peaked at No. 5 on the Billboard Hot 100. He co-wrote Lady Gaga's hit "Just Dance", and which earned a Grammy nomination for Best Dance Recording at the 51st Annual Grammy Awards.

After the unexpected death of Michael Jackson, who Akon was working with, Akon released a tribute song called "Cry Out of Joy". Akon said he was close friends with Jackson near the end of Jackson's life in an interview with UK R&B writer Pete Lewis of the award-winning 'Blues & Soul' in October 2008. In July 2008, a song called "Hold My Hand", an R&B duet/collaboration between Michael Jackson and Akon, circulated the internet. It was not included in the tracklist for Freedom as Akon previously stated. During an interview with Tavis Smiley, Akon said that Jackson had planned on a high-profile release including a music video until the track had leaked. This is Jackson's last known song before he died on June 25, 2009. Akon finished work on the song for Jackson's posthumous album, Michael, and it was released as a single in November 2010.

Akon co-wrote and recorded "Put It on My Tab" with New Kids on the Block for their 2008 reunion album The Block. He also co-wrote and produced Leona Lewis' single "Forgive Me" and worked with X Factor 2008 winner Alexandra Burke on her debut album. He later worked with Whitney Houston for her 2009 comeback album I Look to You, appearing on the track "Like I Never Left". Akon collaborated with Pitbull on the single "Shut It Down" from the album "Rebelution" and worked with Matisyahu to remix his single "One Day" on his album Light. He also co-produced singer Natalia Kills' debut single, "Mirrors", from her debut album, Perfectionist. IsThereSomethingICanDo.com, launched On March 25, 2009, the social action collaboration project between the artists Peter Buffett and Akon has partnered with DoSomething.org, to coincide with the release of "Blood Into Gold". The song focused on human trafficking and featured both artists.

David Guetta collaborated with Akon in "Sexy Bitch", the first house track by Akon. The song reached number 1 in more than six countries and charted at 5 on the Billboard Hot 100. He produced and recorded "Oh Africa" for the 2010 World Cup with Pepsi.

According to Forbes, Akon grossed $13 million in 2011, $21 million in 2010, $20 million in 2009 and $12 million in 2008.

=== 2010–2018: Unreleased Stadium album and hiatus ===
A single, "Angel", produced by Guetta, was released in September 2010, which peaked at number 56 on the US Billboard charts, significantly lower than his previous outings. Akon performed the song during the 2010 Victoria's Secret Fashion Show. Akon travelled to Jamaica to work with Damian, Julian and Stephen Marley. Around the same time, Akon collaborated with Dr. Dre and Snoop Dogg on "Kush", charting on number 36 on the Billboard charts. The single was first intended to from Dr. Dre's forthcoming album Detox; however, it was removed from the final album track list, with the album eventually being unreleased. He also contributed "We Are the World 25 for Haiti", a charity single in aid of the 2010 Haiti earthquake. After an almost three-year hiatus from solo work, Akon released the promotional single "Dirty Work", featuring Wiz Khalifa, which was released in February 2013, peaking at number 31 on the Rhythmic Billboard charts.

In 2010, Buddhist groups in Sri Lanka vehemently protested a planned concert by Akon, saying his music video with Guetta for "Sexy Chick" insulted Buddhism because of the Buddha statue that can be seen several times in the background. Considering the allegations against Akon, the Sri Lankan Government decided not to issue him a visa to enter Sri Lanka.

Later that year, on November 11, 2013, Akon released a standalone single titled "So Blue".

On January 1, 2015, Akon released five singles from Stadium. He also announced that the album would be a quintuple album, broken up into five genres (Euro, Pop, Urban, Island & World). All singles failed to chart.

In November 2015, Akon announced via his official website that he was planning to release his fourth album Stadium in four versions: Stadium-Island, Stadium-Urban, Stadium-World and Stadium-House. These editions of the album would have been available exclusively via the Stadium mobile app which is supported by ads but allows fans to stream the albums. The album was indefinitely postponed.

In late 2015 and early 2016, Akon released the singles "Want Some", "Hypnotized" and "Good Girls Lie", upon striking a new record deal with Atlantic Records. In April 2016, Akon appeared in the Chinese reality TV show I Am a Singer along with the Taiwanese singer Jeff Chang. Later that year, he was featured on the remix of Joey Montana's single "Picky" and featured alongside Chris Brown on Gucci Mane's Michael Jackson tribute single "Moonwalk".

In late 2017, he released a collaborative mixtape with Konvict signees entitled Konvict Kartel Vol. 2. In 2018, he collaborated with reggaeton singer Ozuna on the bilingual single "Coméntale", the first time that Akon sang in Spanish in a Latin song. At the time, he stated he had adopted the nickname "El Negreeto" and would be pursuing collaborations with other Spanish-language artists.

=== 2019–2026: Return to music, Akonik Label Group, El Negreeto, and Akonda ===
Akon has announced his new record label Akonik Label Group and will release four studio albums in different genres. In May 2019, Akon released his first Latin single "Get Money", featuring Puerto Rican rapper Anuel AA. It was intended to be the lead single for his fourth album El Negreeto but didn't appear on the final version of the album. The album was expected to be released on August 30, 2019, but was pushed back and released on October 4, 2019. On September 6, 2019, Akon released "Cómo No" featuring Mexican-American singer Becky G, as the lead single from El Negreeto. He released the album Akonda on October 25, 2019. Konnect was announced as his sixth album, scheduled for December of the same year, but was never released.

A remix of "Locked Up" (originally by Akon) by Steve Aoki and Trinix was released in August 2023. In 2025, Akon joined Canadian country music artist Josh Ross on the song "Drunk Right Now (Na Na Na)", a reimagined take on Akon's song "Right Now (Na Na Na)".

In August 2025, Akon performed in Russia, but his concert in Sochi was nearly disrupted by a drone attack.

== Philanthropy ==
Akon also started a project Akon Lighting Africa in 2014 which provides electricity in 15 countries of Africa.

He also launched his own charity for underprivileged children in Africa called Konfidence Foundation.

Akon was included as a guest appearance in Pitbull's "I Believe That We Will Win (World Anthem)" official music video, in which all proceeds from the song's sales, streaming and views are being donated to Feeding America and the Tony Robbins Foundation as relief to those affected by the COVID-19 pandemic.

== Akon City ==
Construction site of the Akon City Welcome Centre in December 2023.

In 2018, Akon announced he was working with the Senegalese government to build a tourist city with a cryptocurrency-based economy named Akon City, using Akon's own cryptocurrency, Akoin, at the transactional center.

On January 13, 2020, Akon shared on Twitter that the agreements for the city were finalized, and the project was underway. He captioned a photo of himself with Senegal president Macky Sall, "Looking forward to hosting you there in the future."

In June 2020, it was announced that the engineering and consulting firm KE International (the same firm responsible for building Mwale Medical and Technology City) had been awarded a $6 billion contract to build the city. Phase 1 of construction, which was due to begin in 2023 and be completed in 2026, was planned to include roads, a hospital, residences, hotels, a police station, a waste facility, a school, and a solar power plant.

The project has not begun construction, well past schedule, and locals are concerned about a lack of progress. On September 1, 2020, Akon told a news conference that he had laid the first stone of the $6 billion city. "The stone itself sits at the bottom of a dirt track in a field; a small placard advertising the megaproject has fallen off it."

A suit has been brought against Akon in the United States by Devyne Stephens for a debt of almost 4 million dollars borrowed as part of the implementation of his futuristic city project. Stephens said that Akon City and Akoin are part of a fraudulent scheme.

In August 2024, the government of Senegal, through Sapco-Senegal, Senegal's state-owned tourist and coastal development company, issued an ultimatum to Akon: start work or lose 90% of the land allocated for the project.

In July 2025, the project was officially abandoned, with Akon stating he would instead pursue more realistic projects and opportunities.

== Television and film ==
On November 30, 2007, Akon entered the Big Brother house in Pinoy Big Brother: Celebrity Edition 2 as a guest. He also appeared on the edition of November 17, 2008, of WWE Raw, with Santino Marella citing him in his speech.

He collaborated with music director duo Vishal–Shekhar and the English and Hindi lyrics of "Chammak Challo" and "Criminal" as a part of the soundtrack for the 2011 Bollywood film Ra.One.

Akon made his acting debut appearing alongside an ensemble cast in the 2012 Nigerian-American film Black November. In 2014, he starred alongside Hayden Christensen and Adrien Brody in the action movie, American Heist, directed by Sarik Andreasyan.

== Personal life ==
Akon is said to be a polygamist. In 2007, Akon said in an interview with Blender that he had five children (four sons and one daughter) with three different women, and that he was married to one of them. As of December 2022, he has nine children. In 2023, a woman publicly stated that she was one of four women married to Akon, and that the four wives were located in Atlanta, L.A., and Africa. On September 11, 2025, Tomeka Thiam, who he married in 1996, filed for divorce.

Akon is a Muslim and has also stated that he is a teetotaler.

Akon owned a diamond mine in South Africa and denied the existence of blood diamonds (also known as "conflict diamonds") in a 2007 interview, saying: "I don't believe in conflict diamonds. That's just a movie. Think about it. Nobody thought or cared about conflict diamonds until Blood Diamond was released." However, he later stated that he does accept that blood diamonds exist and that he was a partial owner of an African mine that is dedicated to avoiding the use of blood diamonds and donating profits to local communities. In 2020, he revealed he bowed out due to the underlying ramifications of the business. He claimed, "it's worse than the drug business".

Akon stated during an appearance on the ITV2 show The Hot Desk that he is a fan of the English Premier League club Chelsea.

=== Legal issues ===
In 1998, Akon was convicted in New Jersey of a gun charge. However, it did not result in him serving any jail time, with Akon only being sentenced to three years probation. As of November 2025, this remains his only criminal conviction.

On September 10, 2025, Akon was cited for not having insurance and for driving on a suspended license. On November 7, 2025, Akon was arrested in Chamblee, Georgia on an outstanding warrant for failure to appear. He was released from jail after six hours.

== Discography ==
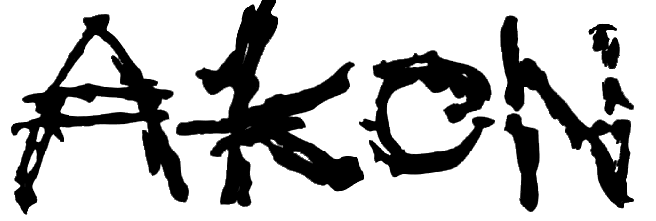
Akon's general marketing logo, used from 2003 to 2007

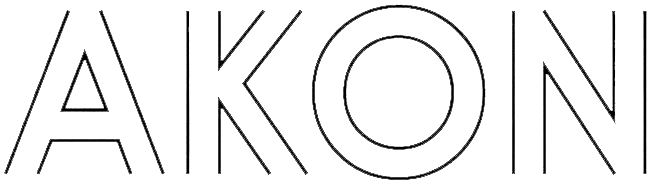
Akon's general marketing logo, used since 2008

Studio albums

- Trouble (2004)
- Konvicted (2006)
- Freedom (2008)
- El Negreeto (2019)
- Akonda (2019)
- Beautiful Day (2026)

== Filmography ==
- Black November (2012)
- American Heist (2014)
- Popstar: Never Stop Never Stopping (2016)

== Tours ==
- Dar Es Salaam, Tanzania One-off Concert (2006).
- Konvicted Tour (July to September 2007, then additional dates in 2008)
- The Sweet Escape Tour with Gwen Stefani (April to July 2007)
- Good Girl Gone Bad Tour with Rihanna (Canadian-leg only, September – December 2008)
- Konvict Muzik Tour with T-Pain (Australia only, October 26–27, 2009)
- Summer Tour, (Brazil-leg only, January to February 2010)
- OMG Tour with Usher (North America Second Leg, April – June 2011)
- Nights Like This Tour with Ne-Yo (April – August 2026)

== See also ==
- List of Billboard Hot 100 chart achievements and milestones
- List of artists who reached number one on the UK Singles Chart
- List of artists who have had number-one singles on the UK Official Download Chart
- List of artists who reached number one in the United States
