= List of Billboard Hot 100 top-ten singles in 2007 =

This is a list of singles that peaked in the top 10 of the Billboard Hot 100 during 2007.

T-Pain and Akon each had seven top-ten hits in 2007, tying them for the most top-ten hits during the year.

== Top-ten singles ==
Key

- ↑ – indicates single's top 10 entry was also its Hot 100 debut
- † – indicates Best performing song of the year
- (#) – 2007 year-end top 10 single position and rank

List of Billboard Hot 100 top ten singles which peaked in 2007
Top ten entry date	Single	Artist(s)	Peak	Peak date	Weeks in top ten
Singles from 2006
November 11	"Fergalicious"	Fergie featuring will.i.am	2	January 13	14
December 16	"We Fly High"	Jim Jones	5	February 3	10
December 23	"Say It Right" (#9)	Nelly Furtado	1	February 24	14
Singles from 2007
January 13	"It Ends Tonight"	The All-American Rejects	8	January 13	3
January 20	"Welcome to the Black Parade"	My Chemical Romance	9	January 20	3
February 3	"This Ain't a Scene, It's an Arms Race" ↑	Fall Out Boy	2	February 3	9
February 3	"It's Not Over"	Daughtry	4	February 10	10
February 10	"Runaway Love"	Ludacris featuring Mary J. Blige	2	March 3	5
February 10	"The Sweet Escape" (#3)	Gwen Stefani featuring Akon	2	April 14	15
February 10	"What Goes Around... Comes Around"	Justin Timberlake	1	March 3	9
February 17	"Walk It Out"	Unk	10	February 17	1
February 17	"You"	Lloyd featuring Lil Wayne	9	February 17	1
February 24	"Cupid's Chokehold"	Gym Class Heroes featuring Patrick Stump	4	March 31	11
February 24	"Glamorous" (#10)	Fergie featuring Ludacris	1	March 24	13
March 3	"Don't Matter"	Akon	1	April 7	13
March 3	"Not Ready to Make Nice"	Dixie Chicks	4	March 3	1
March 10	"Break It Off"	Rihanna featuring Sean Paul	9	March 17	2
March 10	"This Is Why I'm Hot"	Mims	1	March 10	9
March 17	"Girlfriend" ↑	Avril Lavigne	1	May 5	18
March 31	"Throw Some D's"	Rich Boy featuring Polow da Don	6	March 31	2
April 7	"Beautiful Liar"	Beyoncé and Shakira	3	April 7	4
April 14	"Last Night"	Diddy featuring Keyshia Cole	10	April 14	2
April 21	"What I've Done" ↑	Linkin Park	7	April 21	1
April 21	"Buy U a Drank (Shawty Snappin')" (#5)	T-Pain featuring Yung Joc	1	May 26	17
April 21	"Give It to Me"	Timbaland featuring Nelly Furtado and Justin Timberlake	1	April 21	7
May 5	"I Tried"	Bone Thugs-n-Harmony featuring Akon	6	May 26	4
May 5	"U + Ur Hand"	Pink	9	May 5	2
May 12	"I'll Stand by You" ↑	Carrie Underwood	6	May 12	2
May 12	"Never Again" ↑	Kelly Clarkson	8	May 12	2
May 12	"Because of You"	Ne-Yo	2	May 19	3
May 12	"Makes Me Wonder"	Maroon 5	1	May 12	12
May 26	"Pop, Lock & Drop It"	Huey	6	June 2	5
June 2	"Before He Cheats" (#6)	Carrie Underwood	8	June 2	2
June 2	"Home"	Daughtry	5	June 2	3
June 2	"Summer Love"	Justin Timberlake	6	June 9	7
June 9	"Big Girls Don't Cry" (#4)	Fergie	1	September 8	21
June 9	"Party Like a Rockstar"	Shop Boyz	2	June 9	11
June 9	"Umbrella" (#2)	Rihanna featuring Jay-Z	1	June 9	14
June 23	"Hey There Delilah" (#7)	Plain White T's	1	July 28	14
June 23	"Rehab"	Amy Winehouse	9	June 30	4
June 30	"Lip Gloss"	Lil Mama	10	June 30	1
July 7	"Make Me Better"	Fabolous featuring Ne-Yo	8	August 25	8
July 14	"The Way I Are"	Timbaland featuring Keri Hilson and D.O.E.	3	August 25	19
July 21	"Bartender"	T-Pain featuring Akon	5	September 22	10
July 21	"A Bay Bay"	Hurricane Chris	7	July 28	7
July 21	"Big Things Poppin' (Do It)"	T.I.	9	July 21	1
August 4	"What Time Is It?" ↑	High School Musical Cast	6	August 4	1
August 4	"Sorry, Blame It on Me" ↑	Akon	7	August 4	1
August 11	"Beautiful Girls"	Sean Kingston	1	August 11	7
August 18	"Stronger"	Kanye West	1	September 29	16
August 25	"Shawty"	Plies featuring T-Pain	9	September 8	5
September 1	"Crank That (Soulja Boy)"	Soulja Boy Tell 'Em	1	September 15	18
September 15	"Rockstar"	Nickelback	6	September 22	4
September 22	"Let It Go"	Keyshia Cole featuring Missy Elliott and Lil' Kim	7	September 29	4
September 29	"Ayo Technology"	50 Cent featuring Justin Timberlake	5	September 29	2
September 29	"Bed"	J. Holiday	5	October 6	5
September 29	"Who Knew"	Pink	9	September 29	2
October 6	"Bubbly"	Colbie Caillat	5	October 27	17
October 13	"1234"	Feist	8	October 13	1
October 13	"Apologize"	Timbaland featuring OneRepublic	2	November 10	25
October 13	"Gimme More"	Britney Spears	3	October 13	3
October 20	"Good Life"	Kanye West featuring T-Pain	7	November 10	11
October 20	"No One"	Alicia Keys	1	December 1	22
November 3	"Cyclone"	Baby Bash featuring T-Pain	7	November 3	6
November 3	"Hate That I Love You"	Rihanna featuring Ne-Yo	7	December 22	8
November 3	"Kiss Kiss"	Chris Brown featuring T-Pain	1	November 10	15
December 1	"Clumsy"	Fergie	5	December 22	12
December 22	"Tattoo"	Jordin Sparks	8	December 29	6

=== 2006 peaks ===
List of Billboard Hot 100 top ten singles in 2007 which peaked in 2006
Top ten entry date	Single	Artist(s)	Peak	Peak date	Weeks in top ten
September 23	"Lips of an Angel"	Hinder	3	October 14	16
September 30	"How to Save a Life"	The Fray	3	October 7	19
October 14	"Smack That"	Akon featuring Eminem	2	November 4	17
October 28	"My Love"	Justin Timberlake featuring T.I.	1	November 11	14
November 18	"Irreplaceable" † (#1)	Beyoncé	1	December 16	16
December 2	"I Wanna Love You" (#8)	Akon featuring Snoop Dogg	1	December 2	13
December 2	"Shortie Like Mine"	Bow Wow featuring Chris Brown and Johntá Austin	9	December 16	5

=== 2008 peaks ===
List of Billboard Hot 100 top ten singles in 2007 which peaked in 2008
Top ten entry date	Single	Artist(s)	Peak	Peak date	Weeks in top ten
November 24	"Low"	Flo Rida featuring T-Pain	1	January 5	23
November 24	"Paralyzer"	Finger Eleven	6	January 5	9

== Artists with most top-ten songs ==
List of artists by total songs peaking in the top-ten
Artist	Numbers of songs
T-Pain	7
Akon	6
Justin Timberlake	5
Fergie	4
Rihanna	3
Ne-Yo	3
Timbaland	3
Ludacris	2
Nelly Furtado	2
Carrie Underwood	2
Daughtry	2
Keyshia Cole	2
Pink	2
Kanye West	2
T.I.	2
Beyoncé	2
Chris Brown	2

== See also ==
- 2007 in music
- List of Billboard Hot 100 number ones of 2007
- Billboard Year-End Hot 100 singles of 2007
