= Billboard Year-End Hot R&B/Hip-Hop Songs of 2007 =

American music chart

This is a list of Billboard magazine's Top Hot R&B/Hip-Hop Songs of 2007.

No.	Title	Artist(s)
1	"Lost Without U"	Robin Thicke
2	"When I See U"	Fantasia
3	"Please Don't Go"	Tank
4	"Buy U a Drank (Shawty Snappin')"	T-Pain featuring Yung Joc
5	"Teachme"	Musiq Soulchild
6	"You"	Lloyd featuring Lil Wayne
7	"Irreplaceable"	Beyoncé
8	"Promise"	Ciara
9	"Buddy"	Musiq Soulchild
10	"Poppin'"	Chris Brown
11	"Until the End of Time"	Justin Timberlake and Beyoncé
12	"Let It Go"	Keyshia Cole featuring Missy Elliott and Lil' Kim
13	"Shawty"	Plies featuring T-Pain
14	"Bed"	J. Holiday
15	"I'm a Flirt"	Bow Wow featuring R. Kelly
16	"Make Me Better"	Fabolous featuring Ne-Yo
17	"Do You"	Ne-Yo
18	"Throw Some D's"	Rich Boy featuring Polow da Don
19	"Ice Box"	Omarion
20	"I Wanna Love You"	Akon featuring Snoop Dogg
21	"Walk It Out"	Unk
22	"Same Girl"	R. Kelly and Usher
23	"This Is Why I'm Hot"	Mims
24	"Wipe Me Down"	Foxx featuring Lil Boosie and Webbie
25	"Runaway Love"	Ludacris featuring Mary J. Blige
26	"Get Me Bodied"	Beyoncé
27	"Party Like a Rockstar"	Shop Boyz
28	"Crank That (Soulja Boy)"	Soulja Boy Tell'em
29	"Take Me as I Am"	Mary J. Blige
30	"No One"	Alicia Keys
31	"Rock Yo Hips"	Crime Mob featuring Lil Scrappy
32	"Make It Rain"	Fat Joe featuring Lil Wayne
33	"We Fly High"	Jim Jones
34	"My Love"	Justin Timberlake featuring T.I.
35	"Pop, Lock & Drop It"	Huey
36	"On the Hotline"	Pretty Ricky
37	"Like This"	Kelly Rowland featuring Eve
38	"Because of You"	Ne-Yo
39	"Umbrella"	Rihanna featuring Jay-Z
40	"Get It Shawty"	Lloyd
41	"Last Night"	Diddy featuring Keyshia Cole
42	"Big Shit Poppin' (Do It)"	T.I.
43	"2 Step"	Unk
44	"Shortie Like Mine"	Bow Wow featuring Chris Brown and Johntá Austin
45	"Upgrade U"	Beyoncé featuring Jay-Z
46	"Like a Boy"	Ciara
47	"If I Was Your Man"	Joe
48	"Top Back"	T.I.
49	"Don't Matter"	Akon
50	"Can U Believe"	Robin Thicke
51	"Bartender"	T-Pain featuring Akon
52	"In My Songs"	Gerald Levert
53	"Go Getta"	Young Jeezy featuring R. Kelly
54	"A Bay Bay"	Hurricane Chris
55	"Duffle Bag Boy"	Playaz Circle featuring Lil Wayne
56	"Hood Nigga"	Gorilla Zoe
57	"That's That"	Snoop Dogg featuring R. Kelly
58	"Can't Leave 'em Alone"	Ciara featuring 50 Cent
59	"Outta My System"	Bow Wow featuring T-Pain and Johntá Austin
60	"International Players Anthem (I Choose You)"	UGK featuring Outkast
61	"Shawty Is a 10"	The-Dream featuring Fabolous
62	"Kiss Kiss"	Chris Brown featuring T-Pain
63	"How Do I Breathe"	Mario
64	"Change Me"	Ruben Studdard
65	"1st Time"	Yung Joc featuring Marques Houston and Trey Songz
66	"And I Am Telling You I'm Not Going"	Jennifer Hudson
67	"I Luv It"	Young Jeezy
68	"Tambourine"	Eve
69	"Good Life"	Kanye West featuring T-Pain
70	"Anonymous"	Bobby Valentino featuring Timbaland
71	"I Get Money"	50 Cent
72	"Sexy Lady"	Yung Berg featuring Junior
73	"You Know What It Is"	T.I. featuring Wyclef Jean
74	"Cupid Shuffle"	Cupid
75	"DJ Don't"	Gerald Levert
76	"Can't Help but Wait"	Trey Songz
77	"Can't Tell Me Nothing"	Kanye West
78	"My Drink n My 2 Step"	Cassidy featuring Swizz Beatz
79	"Can't Get Enough"	Tamia
80	"If I Have My Way"	Chrisette Michele
81	"Beautiful Girls"	Sean Kingston
82	"One"	Tyrese
83	"Freaky Gurl"	Gucci Mane
84	"Money in the Bank"	Lil Scrappy featuring Young Buck
85	"Make Ya Feel Beautiful"	Ruben Studdard
86	"I'm So Hood"	DJ Khaled featuring T-Pain, Trick Daddy, Rick Ross and Plies
87	"Stuntin' Like My Daddy"	Birdman and Lil Wayne
88	"Me"	Tamia
89	"Wall to Wall"	Chris Brown
90	"Come with Me"	Sammie
91	"Baby"	Angie Stone featuring Betty Wright
92	"Shoulda Let You Go"	Keyshia Cole featuring Amina
93	"We Takin' Over"	DJ Khaled featuring Akon, T.I., Rick Ross, Fat Joe, Baby and Lil Wayne
94	"Be Without You"	Mary J. Blige
95	"Hood Boy"	Fantasia featuring Big Boi
96	"Let's Stay Together"	Lyfe Jennings
97	"Lost One"	Jay-Z featuring Chrisette Michele
98	"Used to Be My Girl"	Brian McKnight
99	"We Ride (I See the Future)"	Mary J. Blige
100	"Wouldn't Get Far"	The Game featuring Kanye West

== See also ==
- 2007 in music
- Billboard Year-End Hot 100 singles of 2007
- Billboard Year-End Hot Rap Songs of 2007
- List of number-one R&B singles of 2007 (U.S.)
