= Billboard Year-End Hot 100 singles of 2007 =

Ranking of recorded music

This is a list of Billboard magazine's Top Hot 100 songs of 2007.

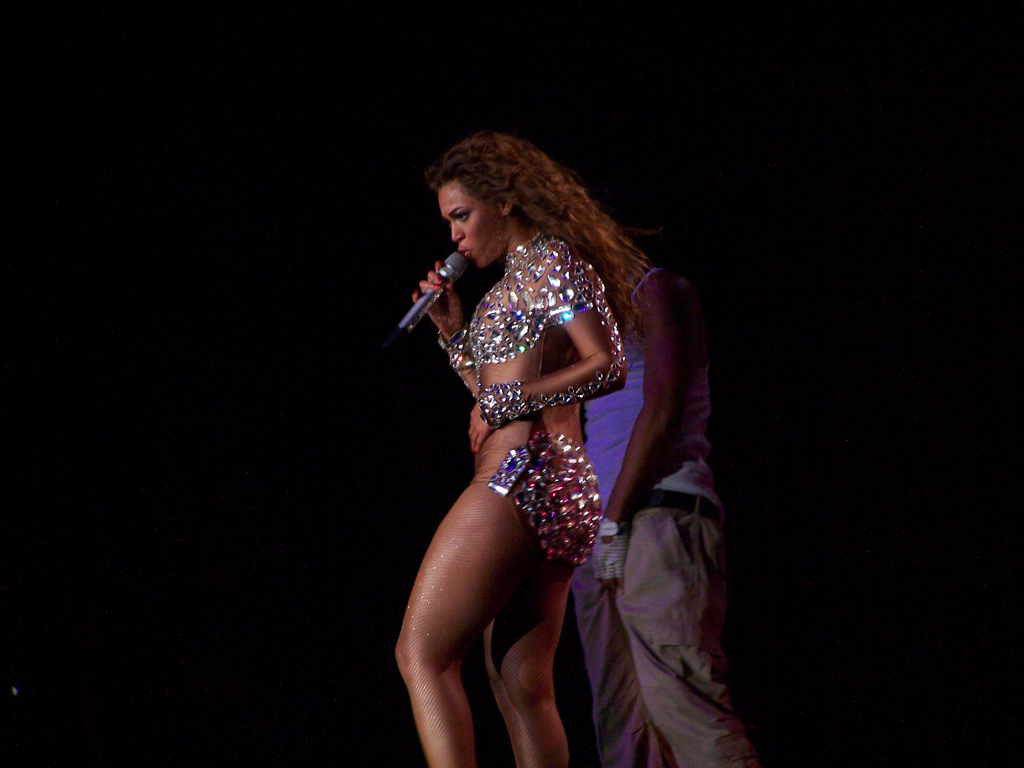
Beyoncé topped the chart with her song "Irreplaceable" and reached number 62 with "Beautiful Liar," a collaboration with Shakira.

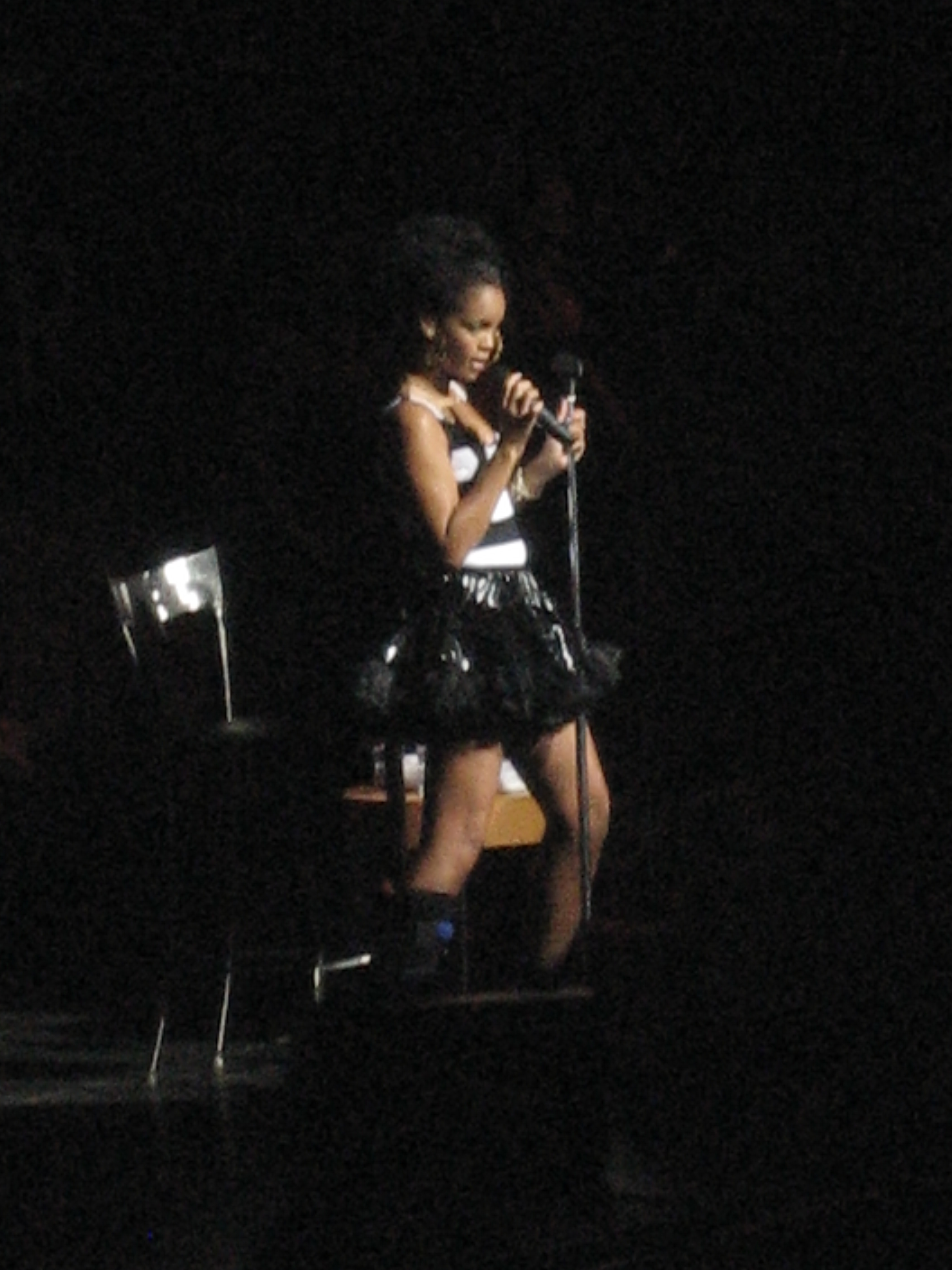
Barbadian singer Rihanna had three songs on the chart, Umbrella" at position 2 and "Shut Up and Drive" at position 90 from her album Good Girl Gone Bad, and "Break It Off" at position 85 from her album A Girl Like Me.

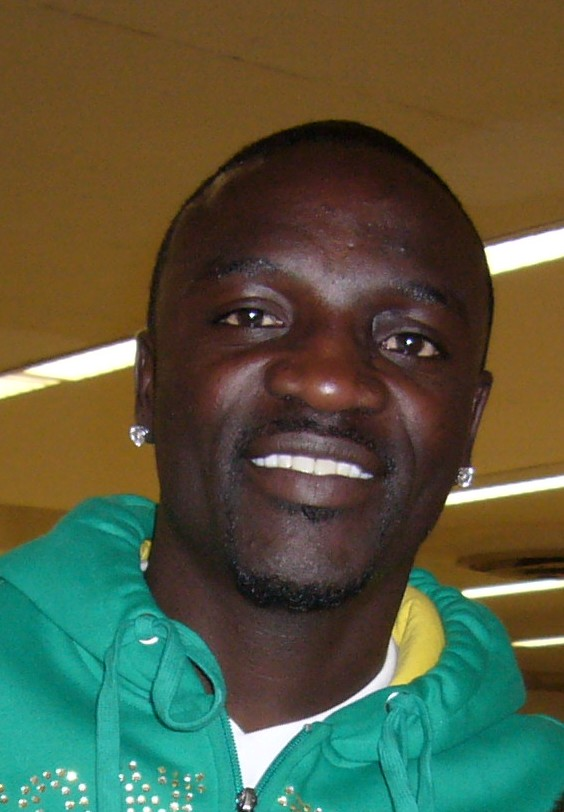
Akon lent his vocals to six songs on the chart, four of which are in the top twenty.

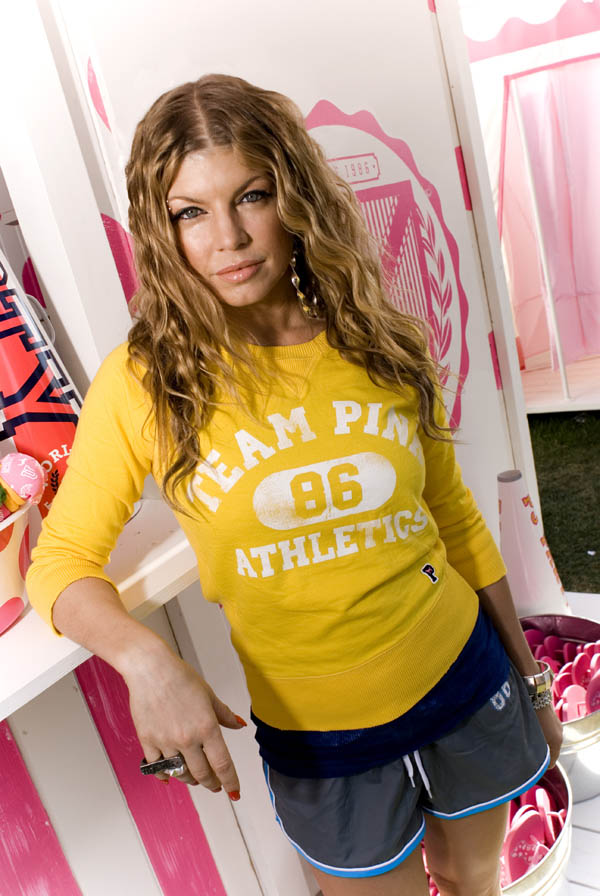
American pop singer Fergie had three songs on the chart, all in the top twenty. "Big Girls Don't Cry" at 4, "Glamorous" at 10, and "Fergalicious" at 19.

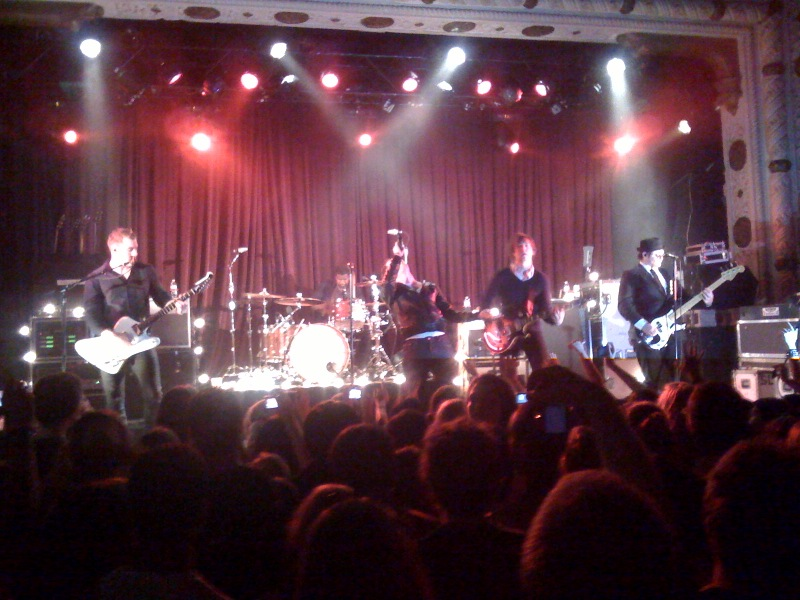
The Plain White T's had the most successful song on the chart by any band with "Hey There Delilah" at position 7.

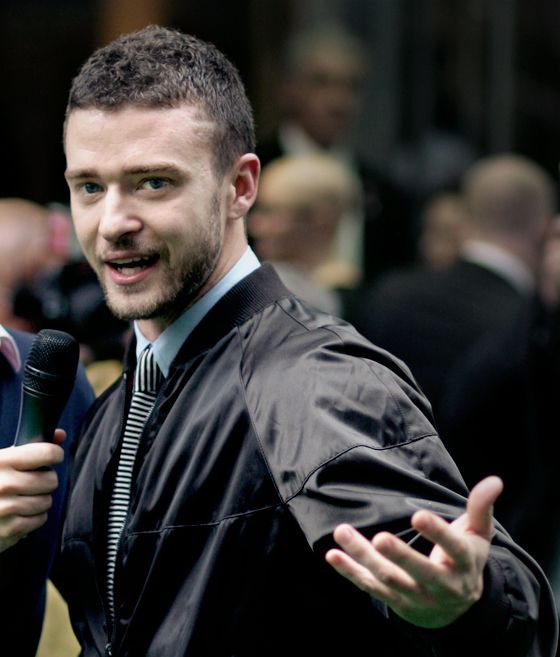
Pop singer Justin Timberlake had the most songs on the chart, with seven.

№	Title	Artist(s)
1	"Irreplaceable"	Beyoncé
2	"Umbrella"	Rihanna featuring Jay-Z
3	"The Sweet Escape"	Gwen Stefani featuring Akon
4	"Big Girls Don't Cry"	Fergie
5	"Buy U a Drank (Shawty Snappin')"	T-Pain featuring Yung Joc
6	"Before He Cheats"	Carrie Underwood
7	"Hey There Delilah"	Plain White T's
8	"I Wanna Love You"	Akon featuring Snoop Dogg
9	"Say It Right"	Nelly Furtado
10	"Glamorous"	Fergie featuring Ludacris
11	"Don't Matter"	Akon
12	"Girlfriend"	Avril Lavigne
13	"Makes Me Wonder"	Maroon 5
14	"Party Like a Rockstar"	Shop Boyz
15	"Smack That"	Akon featuring Eminem
16	"This Is Why I'm Hot"	Mims
17	"It's Not Over"	Daughtry
18	"The Way I Are"	Timbaland featuring Keri Hilson
19	"Fergalicious"	Fergie featuring will.i.am
20	"Crank That (Soulja Boy)"	Soulja Boy Tell 'Em
21	"Give It to Me"	Timbaland featuring Nelly Furtado and Justin Timberlake
22	"What Goes Around... Comes Around"	Justin Timberlake
23	"Cupid's Chokehold"	Gym Class Heroes featuring Patrick Stump
24	"How to Save a Life"	The Fray
25	"Home"	Daughtry
26	"My Love"	Justin Timberlake featuring T.I.
27	"Stronger"	Kanye West
28	"We Fly High"	Jim Jones
29	"U + Ur Hand"	Pink
30	"Walk It Out"	Unk
31	"Beautiful Girls"	Sean Kingston
32	"This Ain't a Scene, It's an Arms Race"	Fall Out Boy
33	"Bartender"	T-Pain featuring Akon
34	"Pop, Lock & Drop It"	Huey
35	"Runaway Love"	Ludacris featuring Mary J. Blige
36	"Rockstar"	Nickelback
37	"Thnks fr th Mmrs"	Fall Out Boy
38	"What I've Done"	Linkin Park
39	"Summer Love"	Justin Timberlake
40	"You"	Lloyd featuring Lil Wayne
41	"Wait for You"	Elliott Yamin
42	"Last Night"	Diddy featuring Keyshia Cole
43	"Make It Rain"	Fat Joe featuring Lil Wayne
44	"Make Me Better"	Fabolous featuring Ne-Yo
45	"Ice Box"	Omarion
46	"Lips of an Angel"	Hinder
47	"Waiting on the World to Change"	John Mayer
48	"Lost Without U"	Robin Thicke
49	"I'm a Flirt"	R. Kelly or Bow Wow featuring T.I. and T-Pain
50	"If Everyone Cared"	Nickelback
51	"Get It Shawty"	Lloyd
52	"Face Down"	The Red Jumpsuit Apparatus
53	"The Way I Live"	Baby Boy da Prince
54	"Shortie Like Mine"	Bow Wow featuring Chris Brown and Johntá Austin
55	"It Ends Tonight"	The All-American Rejects
56	"A Bay Bay"	Hurricane Chris
57	"Because of You"	Ne-Yo
58	"I Tried"	Bone Thugs-n-Harmony featuring Akon
59	"Welcome To The Black Parade"	My Chemical Romance
60	"Shawty"	Plies featuring T-Pain
61	"Chasing Cars"	Snow Patrol
62	"Beautiful Liar"	Beyoncé and Shakira
63	"SexyBack"	Justin Timberlake featuring Timbaland
64	"Keep Holding On"	Avril Lavigne
65	"Let It Go"	Keyshia Cole featuring Missy Elliott and Lil' Kim
66	"Apologize"	OneRepublic
67	"Bubbly"	Colbie Caillat
68	"Like a Boy"	Ciara
69	"Who Knew"	Pink
70	"Never Again"	Kelly Clarkson
71	"Promise"	Ciara
72	"Bed"	J. Holiday
73	"Throw Some D's"	Rich Boy featuring Polow da Don
74	"Rehab"	Amy Winehouse
75	"Big Shit Poppin' (Do It)"	T.I.
76	"No One"	Alicia Keys
77	"The Great Escape"	Boys Like Girls
78	"2 Step"	Unk
79	"Walk Away (Remember Me)"	Paula DeAnda featuring The D.E.Y.
80	"Go Getta"	Young Jeezy featuring R. Kelly
81	"Here (In Your Arms)"	Hellogoodbye
82	"On the Hotline"	Pretty Ricky
83	"Wind It Up"	Gwen Stefani
84	"Cyclone"	Baby Bash featuring T-Pain
85	"Break It Off"	Rihanna featuring Sean Paul
86	"First Time"	Lifehouse
87	"Ayo Technology"	50 Cent featuring Justin Timberlake and Timbaland
88	"Outta My System"	Bow Wow featuring T-Pain and Johntá Austin
89	"Teardrops on My Guitar"	Taylor Swift
90	"Shut Up and Drive"	Rihanna
91	"Snow (Hey Oh)"	Red Hot Chili Peppers
92	"Money Maker"	Ludacris featuring Pharrell
93	"Kiss Kiss"	Chris Brown featuring T-Pain
94	"Far Away"	Nickelback
95	"Rock Yo Hips"	Crime Mob and Lil' Scrappy
96	"LoveStoned"	Justin Timberlake
97	"Better than Me"	Hinder
98	"Paralyzer"	Finger Eleven
99	"That's That"	Snoop Dogg featuring R. Kelly
100	"Same Girl"	R. Kelly featuring Usher

== See also ==
- 2007 in music
- Billboard Year-End Hot R&B/Hip-Hop Songs of 2007
- Billboard Year-End Hot Rap Songs of 2007
- List of Billboard Hot 100 number-one singles of 2007
- List of Billboard Hot 100 top-ten singles in 2007
