= List of awards and nominations received by Akon =

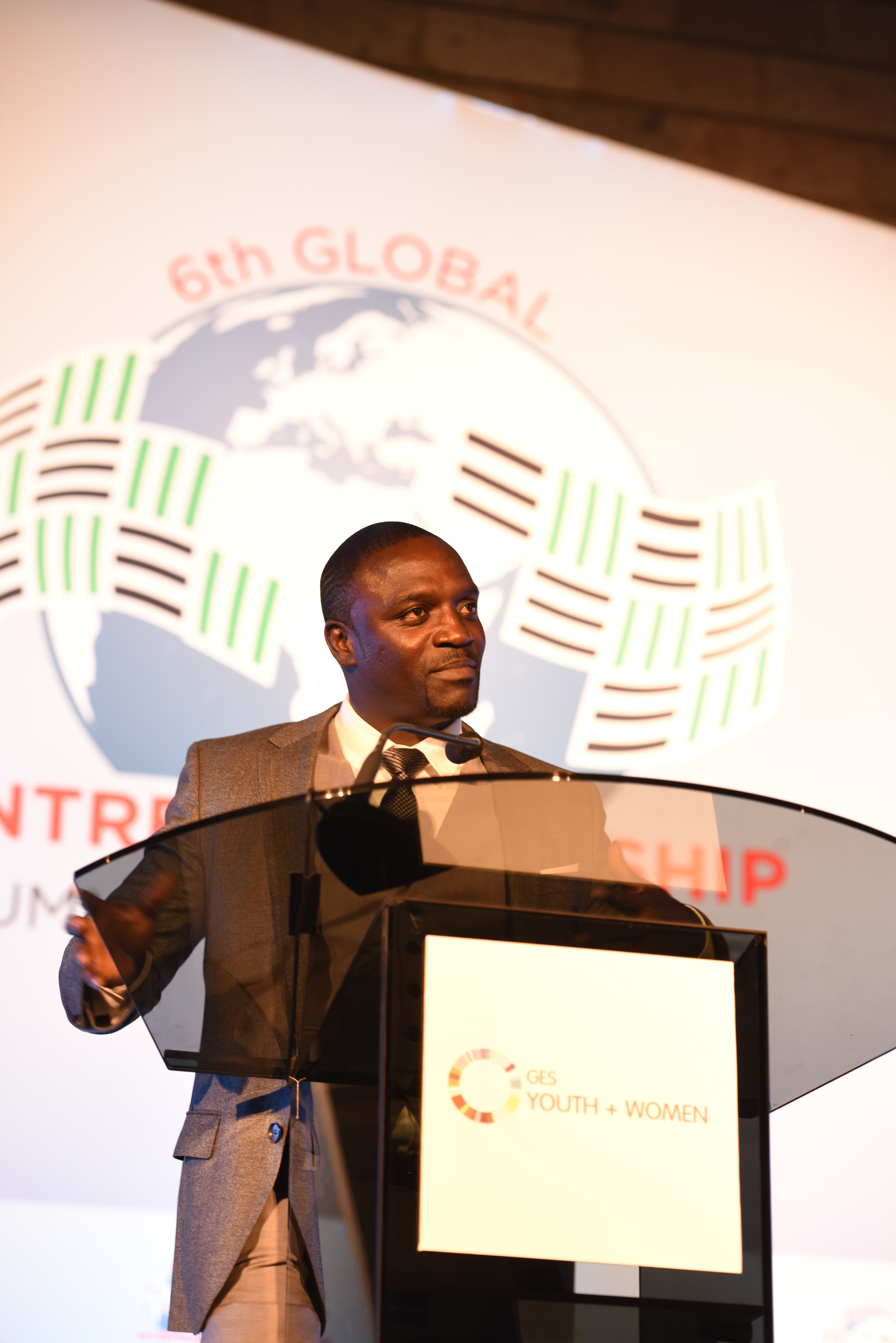
Akon in 2015

This is the list of awards and nominations received by Senegalese American singer, rapper and record producer, Akon.

== Awards and nominations ==
Award	Wins	Nominations
American Music Awards	1	3
World Music Awards	5	8
BET Awards	0	3
BET Hip Hop Awards	1	2
Billboard Awards	1	3
Filmfare Awards	0	1
Grammy Awards	0	5
MOBO Awards	0	4
MTV Europe Music Awards	0	3
MTV Video Music Awards	0	5
Channel O Music Video Awards	1	1
Teen Choice Awards	1	4
Vibe Awards	0	2
- Totals
Awards won	36
Nominations	95

=== American Music Awards ===
Year	Nominee / work	Award	Result
2007	Akon	Artist of the Year	Nominated
2007	Akon	Favorite Pop/Rock Male Artist	Nominated
2007	Akon	Favorite Soul/R&B Male Artist	Won

=== Grammy Awards ===
Year	Nominee / work	Award	Result
2007	"Smack That" (with Eminem)	Best Rap/Sung Collaboration	Nominated
2008	"I Wanna Love You" (with Snoop Dogg)	Best Rap/Sung Collaboration	Nominated
2008	"The Sweet Escape" (with Gwen Stefani)	Best Pop Collaboration with Vocals	Nominated
2008	"Bartender" (with T-Pain)	Best R&B Vocal Performance by a Duo or Group	Nominated
2008	Konvicted	Best Contemporary R&B Album	Nominated

=== Billboard Legacy ===
Made the Top Artists of the Year Chart in 2009 and 2011.

Made the Billboard 200 Albums of the Year Chart in: 2004, 2005, 2006, 2007, 2008, and 2009.

Made the Billboard Hot 100 Songs of the Year Chart in: 2004, 2005, 2006, 2007, 2008, and 2010.

=== Billboard Music Awards ===
Year	Nominee / work	Award	Result
2006	Soul Survivor	Hot Rap Track	Nominated
2007	Akon	Artist of the Year awards	Won
2011	Akon	Top Social Artist	Nominated
2011	Akon	Top Digital Media Artist	Nominated

=== Billboard Latin Music Awards ===
Year	Nominee / work	Award	Result
2011	All Up 2 You	Hot Latin Song of the Year	Nominated

=== World Music Awards ===
Year	Nominee / work	Award	Result
2005	Akon	World's Best Selling New Male Artist	Nominated
2007	Akon	World's Best Selling Internet Artist	Won
2007	Akon	World's Best Selling African Artist	Won
2007	Akon	World's Best Selling R&B Artist	Won
2008	Akon	World's Best Selling African Artist	Won
2010	Akon	World's Best R&B Artist	Nominated
2010	Akon	World's Best Selling African Artist	Won
2010	Sexy Chick	World's Best Single	Nominated

=== BET Hip Hop Awards ===
Year	Nominee / work	Award	Result
2008	Akon	Producer of the Year	Won
2008	We Takin' Over	Best Hip Hop Collaboration	Nominated

=== BET Awards ===
Year	Nominee / work	Award	Result
2007	Akon	Best Male R&B Artist	Nominated
2007	I Wanna Love You	Best Collaboration	Nominated
2007	I Wanna Love You	Video of the Year	Nominated

=== Filmfare Awards ===
Year	Nominee / work	Award	Result
2012	Akon – Chammak Challo	Best Male Playback Singer	Nominated

=== Teen Choice Awards ===
Year	Nominee / work	Award	Result
2007	Akon	Breakout Artist – Male	Won
2007	Akon	R&B Artist	Nominated
2007	Don't Matter	Love Song	Nominated
2007	The Sweet Escape	Single	Nominated

=== MTV Video Music Awards ===
The MTV Video Music Awards is an annual awards ceremony established in 1984 by MTV. Akon has the record for most nominations in the Most Earthshattering Collaboration category.

Year	Nominee / work	Award	Result
2005	"Locked Up"	MTV2 Award	Nominated
2007	Akon	Male Artist of the Year	Nominated
2007	"Smack That" (with Eminem)	Most Earthshattering Collaboration	Nominated
2007	"The Sweet Escape" (with Gwen Stefani)	Most Earthshattering Collaboration	Nominated
2010	"Sexy Chick"	Best Dance Video	Nominated

=== MTV Europe Music Awards ===
Year	Nominee / work	Award	Result
2005	Akon	Best Hip Hop Act	Nominated
2007	Konvicted	Album	Nominated

=== MTV Video Music Award Japan ===
Year	Nominee / work	Award	Result
2007	Smack That	Best Collaboration Video	Nominated

=== MTV Australia Video Music Awards ===
Year	Nominee / work	Award	Result
2007	Smack That	Best Hip Hop Act	Nominated
2007	Smack That	Best Hip Hop Video	Nominated
2007	Smack That	Best Hook Up	Nominated

=== MOBO Awards ===
Year	Nominee / work	Award	Result
2007	Akon	Best R&B	Nominated
2007	Akon	Best International Act	Nominated
2008	Akon	Best International Act	Nominated
2009	Akon	Best International Act	Nominated

=== Juno Awards ===
Year	Nominee / work	Award	Result
2009	Dangerous	Single of the Year	Won

=== ASCAP Awards ===
Year	Nominee / work	Award	Result
2007	"Bartender"	Most Performed Songs	Won
2007	"Don't Matter"	Most Performed Songs	Won
2007	"I Wanna Love You"	Most Performed Songs	Won
2007	"Smack That" (Shared with Eminem)	Most Performed Songs	Won
2008	"The Sweet Escape"	Most Performed Songs	Won
2008	"The Sweet Escape"	Song of the Year	Won
2009	"Dangerous"	Most Performed Songs	Won
2009	"What You Got"	Most Performed Songs	Won
2010	"Just Dance"	Most Performed Songs	Won
2010	"What You Got"	Most Performed Songs	Won
2010	"Right Now (Na Na Na)"	Most Performed Songs	Won
2011	"Sexy Chick"	Most Performed Songs	Won

=== Urban Music Awards ===
Year	Nominee / work	Award	Result
2007	Konvicted	Best Album	Nominated
2009	Akon	Artist of the Year 2009 (USA)	Won
2009	Akon	Artist of the Year 2009 (UK)	Won
2009	Freedom	Best Album 2009 (USA)	Nominated
2009	Freedom	Best Album 2009 (UK)	Nominated
2009	Akon	Best Music Video 2009 (USA)	Nominated
2009	Akon	Best Music Video 2009 (UK)	Nominated

=== Ozone Awards ===
Year	Nominee / work	Award	Result
2007	We Takin' Over	Best video	Won
2007	I Wanna Love You	Best Rap/R&B Collaboration	Nominated
2007	Konvicted	Best R&B Album	Won
2009	Akon	Artist of the Year 2009 (USA & UK)	Won
2009	Freedom	Best Album 2009 (USA & UK)	Nominated
2009	Akon	Best Music Video 2009 (USA & UK)	Nominated

=== ECHO Award ===
Year	Nominee / work	Award	Result
2006	Lonely	National/International Hit of the Year	Won
2006	Akon	International Hip-Hop/R&B Artist	Won

=== MuchMusic Video Award ===
Year	Nominee / work	Award	Result
2007	Lonely	Best International Artist	Nominated
2007	Akon	People's Choice: Favorite International Artist	Nominated
2007	The Sweet Escape	Best International Video	Nominated
2007	The Sweet Escape	People's Choice: Favourite International Artist	Nominated

=== Premios Lo Nuestro ===
Year	Nominee / work	Award	Result
2010	"All Up 2 You" (with Aventura and Wisin & Yandel)	Urban Song of the Year	Nominated
2010	"All Up 2 You" (with Aventura and Wisin & Yandel)	Video Collaboration of the Year	Nominated

=== Vibe Awards ===
Year	Nominee / work	Award	Result
2005	Soul Survivor	Hottest Hook	Nominated
2007	Locked Up	Hottest Hook	Nominated
2008	We Takin' Over	Best Collabobation	Nominated

=== Nickelodeon Kids' Choice Award ===
Year	Nominee / work	Award	Result
2007	Sweet Escape	MTV Hits Best Music Video	Nominated
2008	Don't Matter	Favorite Song	Nominated

=== NRJ Music Awards ===
Year	Nominee / work	Award	Result
2006	Lonely	Best International Song	Nominated
2006	Akon	New International Artist of The Year	Nominated
2008	Akon	International Male Artist of the Year	Nominated
2009	Akon	International Male Artist of the Year	Won

=== Channel O Music Video Awards ===
Year	Nominee / work	Award	Result
2012	Chop My Money	Most Gifted Duo, Group or Featuring Video	Won

=== mtvU Woodie Awards ===
Year	Nominee / work	Award	Result
2007	Don't Matter	Viral Woodie	Nominated
2012	Locked Up	International Woodie (Favorite International Artist Award)	Nominated

=== BMI Pop Songs Music Awards ===
Year	Nominee / work	Award	Result
2008	The Sweet Escape	Pop Songs	Won

=== O Music Awards ===
Year	Nominee / work	Award	Result
2011	I Just Had Sex	Funniest Music Short	Nominated
