= Billboard Year-End Hot Rap Songs of 2007 =

American music chart

This is a list of Billboard magazine's Top Hot Rap Songs of 2007.

No.	Title	Artist(s)
1	"Make Me Better"	Fabolous featuring Ne-Yo
2	"Shawty"	Plies featuring T-Pain
3	"This Is Why I'm Hot"	Mims
4	"Party Like a Rockstar"	Shop Boyz
5	"Walk It Out"	Unk
6	"Crank That (Soulja Boy)"	Soulja Boy Tell 'Em
7	"We Fly High"	Jim Jones
8	"Runaway Love"	Ludacris featuring Mary J. Blige
9	"I'm a Flirt"	Bow Wow featuring R. Kelly
10	"Shortie Like Mine"	Bow Wow featuring Chris Brown and Johntá Austin
11	"Make It Rain"	Fat Joe featuring Lil Wayne
12	"Pop, Lock & Drop It"	Huey
13	"Rock Yo Hips"	Crime Mob featuring Lil Scrappy
14	"Throw Some D's"	Rich Boy featuring Polow da Don
15	"A Bay Bay"	Hurricane Chris
16	"Big Shit Poppin' (Do It)"	T.I.
17	"Outta My System"	Bow Wow featuring T-Pain and Johntá Austin
18	"2 Step"	Unk
19	"Wipe Me Down"	Lil' Boosie featuring Foxx and Webbie
20	"That's That"	Snoop Dogg featuring R. Kelly
21	"Sexy Lady"	Yung Berg featuring Junior
22	"Stronger"	Kanye West
23	"Go Getta"	Young Jeezy featuring R. Kelly
24	"Good Life"	Kanye West featuring T-Pain
25	"Hood Nigga"	Gorilla Zoe

== See also ==
- 2007 in music
- Billboard Year-End Hot 100 singles of 2007
- Billboard Year-End Hot R&B/Hip-Hop Songs of 2007
- List of Billboard number-one rap singles of 2007
