= Notebook Paper =

Studio album by Huey
- Released: June 19, 2007
- Recorded: 2006–07
- Genre: Hip hop
- Length: 57:51
- Labels: Hitz Committee; Jive; Zomba
- Producers: Huey (exec.); MeMpHiTz (exec.); BUTTER; D'Andre "Po Po" Smith; D'Scorch; Jay Wes; Jazze Pha; J$Mil; Key; Laudie; Raw Beatzz; "Rio" the Suproducer; StarGate; T-Mix; T-Pain; Calvin Miller

Huey chronology
Notebook Paper (2007)	Redemption (2010)

Singles from Notebook Paper
- 1. "Pop, Lock & Drop It" Released: September 19, 2006

Notebook Paper is the debut studio album by American rapper Huey. It was released on June 19, 2007, via Hitz Committee/Jive/Zomba Records. Production was handled by several record producers, including Jazze Pha, StarGate, T-Mix and T-Pain. It features guest appearances from Asia Cruise, Diamond, Kydd Trell, Bow Wow, Lloyd, MeMpHiTz, T-Pain, Trey Songz and Yo Gotti.

The album garnered mixed reviews from critics pointing out the overall obviousness throughout the production and track listing. It debuted at number 26 on the Billboard 200 and spawned one single: "Pop, Lock & Drop It". The song peaked at number six on the Billboard Hot 100 and became Huey's only hit.

== Critical reception ==
Professional ratings
Review scores
Source	Rating
AllMusic	3.5/5 stars
RapReviews	6/10
XXL	L

AllMusic editor David Jeffries said that despite repeated mentions of the Hitz Committee label and Huey being held back as a rapper, he praised the variety of different styles used throughout the track listing, saying they sound "more like highlights than missed opportunities". He concluded that, "While more outside help might have shown them the way to something stunning, it's a testament to Huey and the Hitz Committee team that they made a rewarding rather than just promising debut out of some everyday beats and ideas". Steve Juon of RapReviews commended the production and "radio ready" tracks but found the overall record to be "rather obvious" with said tracks and the various topics it speaks about, saying that, "[I]f you're looking through Huey's notebook to find anything deep or substantive then disappointment is bound to ensue. [...] the feeling overall is that this album was carefully packaged and planned in a corporate record label's hitmaking factory". Jacinta Howard of XXL was critical of Huey's youthful brag rap being "overly materialistic" but commended him for swapping it for sincerity on "Glad to Be Alive" and "Nobody Loves the Hood", concluding that: "Teetering between fun-loving rapper and gangsta griot, Huey fills his notebook with enough decent material to make people wanna pop, lock and cop it."

== Commercial performance ==
The album debuted at number 26 on the Billboard 200 with 29,000 copies sold in its first week. It dropped thirty-six spots to number 62 the next week and placed number 89 the week after.

== Track listing ==
No.	Title	Writer(s)	Producer(s)	Length
1.	"Intro/Notebook Paper"	Lawrence Franks Jr.; Ryan Belcher; Ruben Gonzalez	Ryan "Key" Belcher; Laudie	4:09
2.	"Bout Dat"	Franks Jr.; Dennis Preston Jr.	D'Scorch	4:11
3.	"Aye"	Franks Jr.; Gonzalez	Laudie	3:51
4.	"Pop, Lock & Drop It"	Franks Jr.; D'Andre Smith; Calvin Miller	D'Andre "Po Po" Smith; Calvin Miller (add.)	4:21
5.	"Closet Full of Clothes" (featuring Kydd Trell)	Franks Jr.; Latrell Weaver; Gonzalez	Laudie	4:03
6.	"2 Nite"	Franks Jr.; Jamil Debardlabon	J$Mil	4:20
7.	"Tell Me This (G-5)" (featuring MeMpHiTz)	Franks Jr.; Mickey Wright Jr.; John Wesley; Gonzalez	Jay Wes; Laudie	6:30
8.	"Money Ova" (featuring Diamond and Yo Gotti)	Franks Jr.; Brittany Carpentero; Mario Mims; Robert Crawford; Demario Hammonds	Butter; "Rio" the Suproducer	5:02
9.	"My Zone"	Franks Jr.; Triston Jones	Mannie Fresh	3:28
10.	"When I Hustle" (featuring Lloyd)	Franks Jr.; Lloyd Polite; Phalon Alexander	Jazze Pha	3:31
11.	"Luv N Ya Life" (featuring Asia Cruise)	Franks Jr.; Ashley Bell; Faheem Najm	Raw Beatzz	3:54
12.	"Nobody Loves the Hood"	Franks Jr.; Mikkel Storleer Eriksen; Tor Erik Hermansen; Taj Jackson	StarGate	4:08
13.	"Glad 2 Be Alive" (featuring T-Pain)	Franks Jr.; Najm	T-Pain	3:53
14.	"Pop, Lock & Drop It (Remix)" (featuring Lil' Bow Wow and T-Pain)	Franks Jr.; Shad Moss; Najm; Smith; Miller	D'Andre "Po Po" Smith; Calvin Miller (add.)	4:34
Total length:				57:51

Japanese edition (bonus track)

No.	Title	Producer(s)	Length
6.	"I Got Em On (Adidas)"	Jay Wes	3:09

== Personnel ==
- Lawrence Franks Jr. – main artist, executive producer
- Latrell "Kydd Trell" Weaver – featured artist (track 5)
- Mickey "MeMpHiTz" Wright Jr. – featured artist (track 7), executive producer, A&R
- Brittany Nicole Carpentero – featured artist (track 8)
- Mario Sentell Giden Mims – featured artist (track 8)
- Lloyd Polite Jr. – featured artist (track 10)
- Asia Nalani Vernimo – featured artist (track 11)
- Tremaine Aldon Neverson – featured artist (track 12)
- Faheem Rasheed Najm – featured artist (tracks: 13, 14), producer (track 13), recording (tracks: 11, 13)
- Shad Gregory Moss – featured artist (track 14)
- Carlton McClendon – keyboards (track 6)
- Aaron Clay – guitar (track 10)
- Ryan "Key" Belcher – producer (track 1a)
- Ruben "Laudie" Gonzalez – producer (tracks: 1b, 3, 5, 7), recording (track 7)
- Dennis Preston Jr. – producer (track 2)
- D'Andre "Po Po" Smith – producer (tracks: 4, 14)
- Calvin Miller – additional producer (tracks: 4, 14)
- Jamil Debardlabon – producer (track 6)
- John Wesley – producer (tracks: 7, bonus)
- Robert Crawford – producer (track 8)
- Demario Hammonds – producer (track 8)
- Triston "T-Mix" Jones – producer (track 9)
- Phalon Anton Alexander – producer (track 10)
- Ashley J. Bell – producer (track 11)
- Mikkel Storleer Eriksen – producer & recording (track 12)
- Tor Erik Hermansen – producer (track 12)
- Howard "Ross" Vanderslice – recording (tracks: 1a, 14)
- Danny Ogle – recording (track 1b), assistant recording (track 9)
- Justin Trawick – assistant recording (tracks: 1b, 9)
- Chris Robinson – recording (tracks: 2, 5)
- Marc “Matrix” DuPain – assistant recording (tracks: 2, 5)
- Matt Sawicki – recording (tracks: 3, 4)
- Ralph Cacciurri – recording (tracks: 6, 8)
- Rich Tapper – recording (track 7)
- Leo Goff – recording (track 8)
- Nico Solis – recording (tracks: 9–11)
- Mike Wilson – recording (track 9)
- James "Scrappy" Stassen – recording (track 13)
- Travis Daniels – recording (track 14)
- Leslie Brathwaite – mixing (tracks: 1, 4, 6–8, 10, 14)
- John Frye – mixing (tracks: 1, 2, 5)
- Fabian Marasciullo – mixing (tracks: 9, 13)
- Phil Tan – mixing (tracks: 11, 12)
- Kori Anders – assistant mixing (tracks: 1, 4, 6–8, 10, 14)
- Gary Fly – assistant mixing (tracks: 1, 2, 5)
- Douglas Sadler – assistant mixing (tracks: 9, 13)
- Josh Houghkirk – assistant mixing (tracks: 11, 12)
- Brian Gardner – mastering
- Rico Washingston – management

== Charts ==
Chart (2007)	Peak position
US Billboard 200	26
US Top R&B/Hip-Hop Albums (Billboard)	10
US Top Rap Albums (Billboard)	4
