= Church (T-Pain song) =

Single by T-Pain

from the album Epiphany
- Released: October 2, 2007
- Recorded: 2007
- Genre: Hip-hop
- Length: 4:01
- Label: Nappy Boy; Konvict; Jive
- Songwriter: Faheem Najm
- Producer: T-Pain

T-Pain singles chronology
"Good Life" (2007)	"Church" (2007)	"Low" (2007)

"Church" is a song written, produced, and performed by American singer T-Pain, released as the third single from his album Epiphany (2007). It is a fast-paced song led by guitar riffs and is one of T-Pain's songs on which he raps; it "features" Teddy Verseti, one of T-Pain's aliases, which he uses when rapping vigorously. The song is about wanting to fight someone following a confrontation at a club. It was confirmed as the third single from Epiphany in an interview promoting the album.

The Future Presidents remix is used for the official video. It was featured on 106 & Park on October 22, 2007 as the "New Joint of the Day". The song is also featured on the Step Up 2: The Streets soundtrack.

In the UK, "Church" eventually reached a peak of No. 35, two weeks after the physical release of the song. The single also peaked at No. 7 on the New Zealand RIANZ charts, and was also certified gold there.

== Track listing ==
UK CD

1. "Church" (featuring Teddy Verseti) (main version - explicit)
2. "Buy U a Drank (Shawty Snappin')" (remix) (featuring Kanye West) (main version - explicit)

iTunes EP

1. "Church" explicit
2. "Church" revised clean - without gunshots
3. "Church" instrumental

== Charts ==
=== Weekly charts ===
Chart (2008)	Peak position
Ireland (IRMA)	41
New Zealand (Recorded Music NZ)	7
Scotland Singles (OCC)	49
UK Singles (OCC)	35
UK Hip Hop/R&B (OCC)	4

=== Year-end charts ===
Chart (2008)	Position
UK Singles (OCC)	168
UK Urban (Music Week)	15

== Certifications ==
Region	Certification	Certified units/sales
New Zealand (RMNZ)	7× Platinum	210,000^{‡}
United Kingdom (BPI)	Silver	200,000^{‡}
United States (RIAA)	Gold	500,000^{‡}
^{*} Sales figures based on certification alone.^{‡} Sales+streaming figures based on certification alone.
