= Asia Cruise =

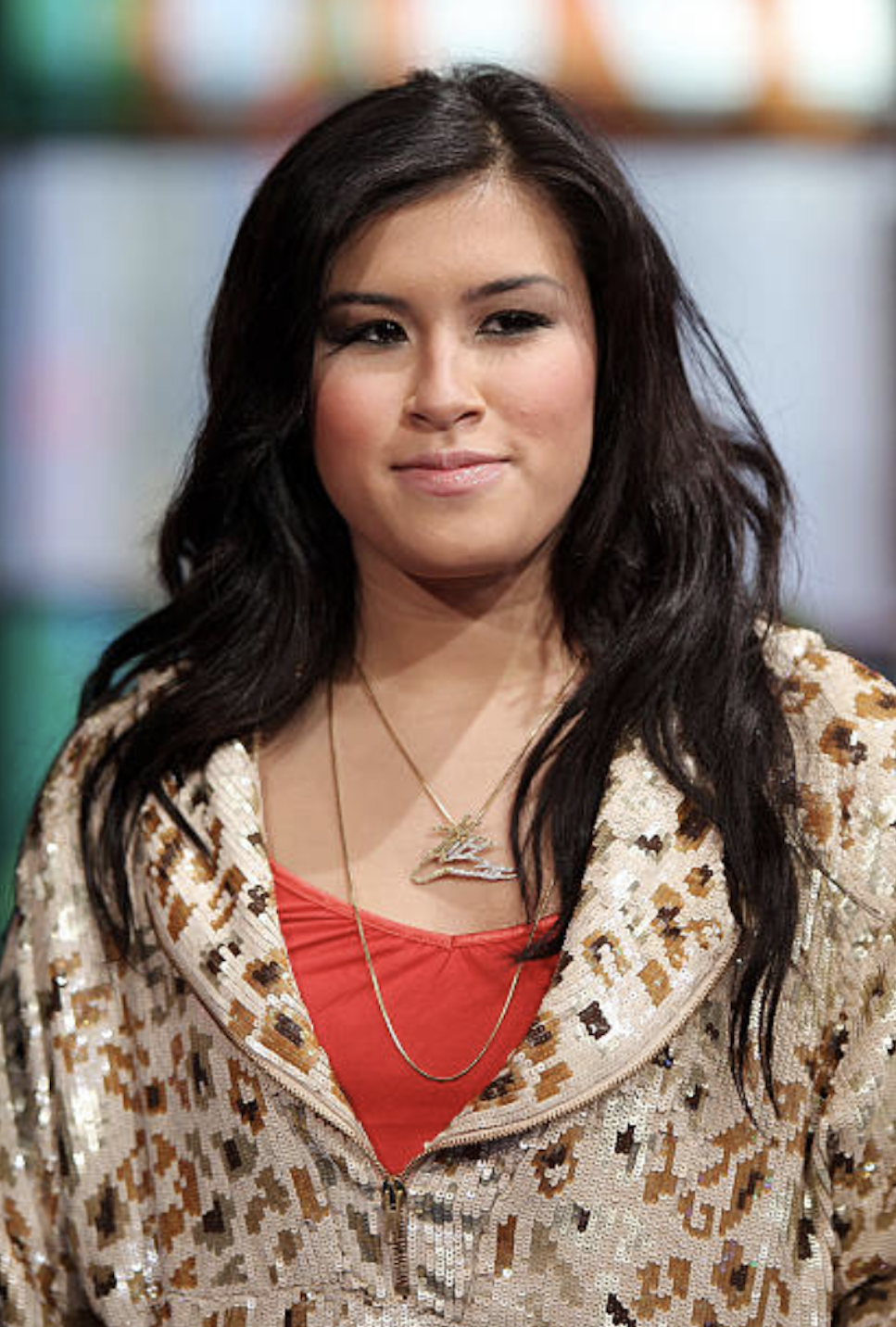
- Kovacs performing on MTV's Total Request Live in 2008.

Background information
- Born: Asia Nalani Vernimo; February 11, 1990 (age 36); Jacksonville, Florida,
- Origin: Jacksonville, Florida, U.S.
- Genres: R&B, Pop
- Occupation: Singer
- Years active: 2006-2019
- Label: Hitz Committee/Jive
- Website: www.myspace.com/asiahitz

Asia Nalani Vernimo-Kovacs (née Vernimo; born February 11, 1990), known professionally as Asia Cruise, is an American R&B singer. In 2008, she became the first artist of Asian descent to be signed to Hitz Committee/Jive Records and was discovered by the Vice President of A&R at Jive Records, Mickey "MeMpHiTz" Wright.

== Early life and education ==
Originally from Jacksonville, Florida, Asia Cruise is of Filipino, Caucasian, and Native American descent. She is the daughter of Cecilia "Cissy" Cenizal Vernimo (died 2023) and Arlen Vernimo. She has two younger siblings, Max (born in 1991) and Alyssa (born in 1998). She had earned a degree in English at University of Florida.

== Career ==
Signed to Jive Records in 2007, Cruise released her debut single "Selfish" in 2008 by revealing her face only after the music video premiered on BET's 106 & Park. "Selfish" became a modest hit in the United States; peaking at number 33 on the Rhythmic Songs airplay, it spent nine weeks on the chart. Cruise also appeared in the music videos for Huey’s single “Pop, Lock & Drop It”, apl.de.ap's charity single "We Be Workin", Huey’s single "Tell Me This (G-5) Remix" featuring MempHitz and T-Pain, and Huey’s single featuring Lloyd, "When I Hustle ".

== Personal life ==
She now lives with her husband, 2 sons, and daughter, in Jacksonville, Florida.

== Discography ==
=== Albums ===
Year	Title
2008	Who Is Asia Cruise?: Released: Shelved; Label: Mosley/Zone4/Interscope/Hitz Committee

=== Singles ===
Year	Title	Peak chart positions	Album
Year	Title	U.S. Rhythmic	Album
2008	"Selfish"	33	Who Is Asia Cruise?
2008	"Boyfriend"	-	Who Is Asia Cruise?
