= Mama Africa =

Mama Africa may refer to:

== Music ==
- Mama Africa (Peter Tosh album), 1983
- Mama Africa (Yemi Alade album), 2016
- "Mama Africa" (song), by Akon from his 2006 album Konvicted
- "Mama Africa", a song by Yemi Alade from the album of the same name
- "Mama África", a song by Brazilian singer Chico César
- "Mama Africa", a song by Swedish band Panetoz

== Other uses ==
- Miriam Makeba (1932–2008), South African singer and civil rights activist, also known as Mama Africa
- Mama África, a 2011 documentary film by Mika Kaurismäki about Miriam Makeba
- Mama África FC, a Philippine football club that participated in the inaugural year of the United Football League
