= Epiphany (T-Pain album) =

Studio album by T-Pain
- Released: June 5, 2007
- Recorded: 2006–2007
- Genre: R&B; hip-hop
- Length: 56:09
- Label: Nappy Boy; Konvict; Jive; Zomba
- Producer: T-Pain

T-Pain chronology
Rappa Ternt Sanga (2005)	Epiphany (2007)	Three Ringz (2008)

Singles from Epiphany
- 1. "Buy U a Drank (Shawty Snappin')" Released: February 20, 2007; 2. "Bartender" Released: May 5, 2007; 3. "Church" Released: October 2, 2007

Epiphany is the second studio album by American singer T-Pain, It was released on June 5, 2007, by his record label Nappy Boy Entertainment, under the distribution of Akon's label Konvict Muzik, Jive Records, and Zomba Label Group. The album marks a first for T-Pain, who launched his own record label Nappy Boy Entertainment.

Critics gave the album mixed reviews. Epiphany debuted at number 1 on the Billboard 200 and spawned three singles: "Buy U a Drank (Shawty Snappin')", "Bartender" and "Church".

== Singles ==
The album's lead single, "Buy U a Drank (Shawty Snappin')" was released on February 20, 2007. The song features guest vocals from a fellow southern hip hop rapper Yung Joc. T-Pain provides the production on this track. The song peaked at number one on the US Billboard Hot 100, making it his highest-charting single as a lead artist.

The album's second single, "Bartender" was released on June 5, 2007. The song features guest vocals from musician and his then label-mate Akon, with T-Pain, who also produced this track. The song peaked at number 5 on the US Billboard Hot 100.

== Critical reception ==
Professional ratings
Review scores
Source	Rating
AllMusic	3/5 stars
HipHopDX	3/5 stars
Pitchfork	8.0/10
PopMatters	7/10
Rolling Stone	3/5 stars
Sputnikmusic	3.5/5

Epiphany received mixed reviews from music critics. Gentry Boeckel of PopMatters credited T-Pain on his production and use of various characters on the songs he wrote. He also said that his career will last more than other past R&B artists like Case, Joe and Tyrese, concluding that "T-Pain does seem posed for more success than those other guys. He may even be worth the verbiage, too." John Hanson of Sputnikmusic also praised the album for its production, complimenting the songs (specifically the singles) saying, "T-Pain is starting to establish himself as a lasting source of entertainment in the vein of R. Kelly." Vibe writer Chris Ryan also agreed with the R. Kelly similarities, praising the different facets of love and changes in genre, concluding that "Like any modern machine, T-Pain takes what he wants, strip it down, and gives it the voice of computer love." Meka Udoh of HipHopDX credited songs like "Time Machine" and "Suicide" for bringing out a semi-serious T-Pain but was put off by his use of multiple characters throughout the album saying, "While Epiphany has its moments, it is also its schizophrenic nature that bogs the album down." AllMusic editor David Jeffries questioned the album being 'mature', finding that side not mixing together with the party side of T-Pain's music. Norman Mayers of Prefix criticized the album for bringing out "the worst stereotypes of black music and culture" in the R&B genre saying, "Epiphany is a profound statement on the poor quality and embarrassing content found in mainstream urban music."

== Commercial performance ==
Epiphany debuted at number one on the US Billboard 200, selling 171,126 copies in its first week. In its second week, the album dropped to number five on the chart, selling an additional 82,000 copies. In its third week, the album dropped to number ten on the chart, selling 56,000 more copies that week. As of September 2008, the album has sold 819,000 copies in the United States.

== Track listing ==
All tracks produced by T-Pain.

No.	Title	Writer(s)	Length
1.	"Tallahassee Love" (featuring Jay Lyriq)	Faheem Najm; Woodrow Cunningham; Norman Durham; Mikel Hooks; Ronald G. Hudson; Larry Troutman; Roger Troutman	2:04
2.	"Church" (featuring Teddy Verseti)	Najm	4:01
3.	"Tipsy"	Najm	3:09
4.	"Show U How" (featuring Teddy Pain and Teddy Penderazdoun)	Najm	3:14
5.	"I Got It"	Najm	1:54
6.	"Suicide"	Najm	2:58
7.	"Bartender" (featuring Akon)	Najm; Aliaume Thiam	3:58
8.	"Backseat Action" (featuring Shawnna)	Najm; Rashawnna Guy	3:39
9.	"Put It Down" (featuring Ray Lavender, Teddy Verseti and Teddy Penderazdoun)	Najm	3:40
10.	"Time Machine"	Najm; Frank Romano	2:52
11.	"Yo Stomach" (featuring Tay Dizm)	Najm	4:18
12.	"Buy U a Drank (Shawty Snappin')" (featuring Yung Joc)	Najm; Jasiel Robinson	3:47
13.	"69" (featuring Jay Lyriq)	Najm; Jeffery Grigsby; James Hollis; Sean P. Joseph; Antwan Patton; Kawan Prather; Maurice L. Sinclair	3:25
14.	"Reggae Night"	Najm	1:37
15.	"Shottas" (featuring Kardinal Offishall and Cham)	Najm; Jason Harrow; Damian Beckett; Dave Kelly	3:14
16.	"Right Hand"	Najm; Frank Romano	3:13
17.	"Sounds Bad"	Najm	5:06
Total length:			56:09

iTunes bonus tracks
No.	Title	Writer(s)	Length
18.	"Calm the Fuck Doun"	Najm	4:03
19.	"Let the Bass Drop"	Najm	4:55

Sample credits

- "Tallahassee Love" contains a portion of the composition "California Love" written by Woodrow Cunningham, Norman Durham, Mikel Hooks, Ronald G. Hudson, Larry Troutman, and Roger Troutman.
- "I Got It" contains a sample from "I'm Sprung", written by Faheem Najm, as performed by T-Pain.
- "69" contains a portion of the composition "85", written by Jeffery Grigsby, James Hollis, Sean P. Joseph, Antwan Patton, Kawan Prather, and Maurice L. Sinclair.

== Charts ==
=== Weekly charts ===
Chart (2007)	Peak position
Australian Albums (ARIA)	96
Japanese Albums (Oricon)	72
New Zealand Albums (RMNZ)	11
US Billboard 200	1
US Top R&B/Hip-Hop Albums (Billboard)	1

=== Year-end charts ===
Chart (2007)	Position
US Billboard 200	62
US Top R&B/Hip-Hop Albums (Billboard)	21

== Certifications ==
Region	Certification	Certified units/sales
New Zealand (RMNZ)	3× Platinum	45,000^{‡}
United States (RIAA)	2× Platinum	2,000,000^{‡}
^{‡} Sales+streaming figures based on certification alone.

== Release history ==
Region	Date	Format	Label
Denmark	June 1, 2007	Digital download, CD	Jive
United Kingdom	June 1, 2007	Digital download, CD	Jive
Canada	June 2, 2007	Digital download, CD	Jive
Japan	June 2, 2007	Digital download, CD	Jive
Australia	June 4, 2007	Digital download, CD	Jive
United States	June 5, 2007	Digital download, CD	Jive

== See also ==
- List of Billboard 200 number-one albums of 2007
- List of Billboard number-one R&B albums of 2007
