= I Like Dat =

2021 song by T-Pain and Kehlani

Single by T-Pain and Kehlani
- Released: May 14, 2021
- Genre: R&B
- Length: 4:02
- Label: Nappy Boy; Empire
- Songwriters: Faheem Najm; Kehlani Ashley Parrish
- Producers: DJ Montay; T-Pain

T-Pain singles chronology
"Wake Up Dead" (2020)	"I Like Dat" (2021)	"I'm Cool With That" (2021)

Kehlani singles chronology
"Back Together" (2021)	"I Like Dat" (2021)	"Ur Best Friend" (2021)

Music video
- "I Like Dat" on YouTube

"I Like Dat" is a song by American singers T-Pain and Kehlani. It was released on May 14, 2021, through Nappy Boy and Empire. The song is a "sequel" of T-Pain's song "Buy U a Drank (Shawty Snappin')" (2007).

== Background ==
In early May 2021, T-Pain went live on Instagram with Mark Zuckerberg to discuss Zuckerberg sending him messages. At the end of the livestream, T-Pain introduced Kehlani and announced their collaboration. In a statement, T-Pain expressed that Kehlani "has been one of the best to work with", saying: "[They] did [their] thing on this track and made it what it is."

== Composition ==
The song is written in the key of F♯ Minor, with a tempo of 88 beats per minute. The Song's intro is taken from a sample of T-Pain's 2007 hit single Buy U a Drank (Shawty Snappin'), released 14 years earlier.

== Music video ==
An accompanying "cowboy-style" music video was released on June 24, 2021, and directed by Christian Breslauer. The video features T-Pain arriving in a town "on his horse and buggy to sell his self-made "drank" to the townsfolk". Kehlani plays his associate, a townswoman "downing [their] drink and making out with a fellow townswoman, which arouses the gunslingers". T-Pain makes a profit and performs the song with Kehlani in a saloon before they set off for another town.

== Remix ==
The official remix features American rapper Bia and was released October 1, 2021.

== Charts ==
=== Weekly charts ===
Weekly chart performance for "I Like Dat"
Chart (2021)	Peak position
New Zealand Hot Singles (RMNZ)	18
US Billboard Hot 100	97
US Hot R&B/Hip-Hop Songs (Billboard)	36
US Rhythmic Airplay (Billboard)	6

=== Year-end charts ===
Year-end chart performance for "I Like Dat"
Chart (2021)	Position
US Rhythmic (Billboard)	37

== Certifications ==
Certifications for "I Like Dat"
Region	Certification	Certified units/sales
New Zealand (RMNZ)	Platinum	30,000^{‡}
United States (RIAA)	Gold	500,000^{‡}
^{‡} Sales+streaming figures based on certification alone.

== Release history ==
Release history and versions for "I Like Dat"
Region	Date	Format	Version	Label	Ref.
Various	May 14, 2021	Digital download; streaming	Original	Nappy Boy	
United States	June 1, 2021	Rhythmic contemporary	Original	Nappy Boy	
Various	October 1, 2021	Digital download; streaming	Bia remix	Nappy Boy	
