= Mama Africa (song) =

Single by Akon

from the album Konvicted
- Released: May 15, 2007
- Genre: Reggae
- Length: 4:25
- Label: Konvict; UpFront; SRC; Universal
- Songwriters: Thiam; Abdulsamad; Browne; Dixon; Dwyer; Elton; Gowdy; Otto; Richards
- Producer: Akon

Akon singles chronology
"The Way She Moves" (2007)	"Mama Africa" (2007)	"Bartender" (2007)

"Mama Africa" is a song by Akon, released in 2007 as the fourth single from his second studio album, Konvicted (2006). The single was released to radio stations on May 15, 2007, before being officially released in the United Kingdom on July 30, 2007. The official remix of the track features 50 Cent. The lyrics are written as a homage to Akon's ancestral homeland, Africa. The song peaked at No. 47 on the UK Singles Chart, and No. 5 on the UK R&B Singles Chart. The track was B-listed upon its first airplay on BBC Radio 1. The single's artwork was designed by Chris Jarvis. A video for the song was filmed in October 2006, however, due to licensing issues, was not released. The video was later leaked to the internet in February 2009.

== Track listing ==
UK CD single

1. "Mama Africa" - 4:25
2. "Kill the Dance (Got Something for Ya)" (feat. Kardinal Offishall) - 2:58

European CD single

1. "Mama Africa" - 4:25
2. "Mama Africa" (Instrumental) - 4:25
3. "Don't Matter" (Calypso Remix) - 5:38
4. "Don't Matter" (Calypso Instrumental) - 5:38

== Charts ==
Chart (2007)	Peak position
CIS Airplay (TopHit)	197
Scottish Singles Sales (Official Charts)	33
UK Singles (Official Charts)	47
UK Hip Hop/R&B (Official Charts)	5
US Bubbling Under R&B/Hip-Hop Singles (Billboard)	8
