= Redemption (Huey album) =

Studio album by Huey
- Released: September 14, 2010
- Recorded: 2008–10
- Genre: Hip hop
- Length: 46:14
- Label: Que Records, EMI
- Producer: D.Clax, J$MiL, Trillion Billion Dollar Beats, Epik, M-16

Huey chronology
Notebook Paper (2007)	Redemption (2010)

Singles from Redemption
- 1. "Smile & Wave" Released: June 15, 2010

Professional ratings
Review scores
Source	Rating
RapReviews	(6/10)

Redemption is the second and final studio album by American rapper Huey, released on September 14, 2010. It was the last album he released before he was murdered on June 25, 2020.

== Background ==
Huey originally recorded songs for an album entitled Strictly Business, but it ended up being released as a DVD. Redemption was supposed to be released in 2009. The album release got delayed and the album was released on September 14, 2010.

== Track listing ==
No.	Title	Producer(s)	Length
1.	"Redemption" (featuring NOTE)	D.Clax & J$MiL	3:59
2.	"Hello 2 All My Haters"	J$MiL	3:55
3.	"Smile & Wave" (featuring Dorrough)	J$MiL	4:14
4.	"I Go Crazy" (featuring Colby O'Donis)	Trillion Billion Dollar Beats	3:34
5.	"Rain"	J$MiL	3:45
6.	"High" (featuring JR)	D.Clax	4:08
7.	"Famous" (featuring Mack)	Epik	3:03
8.	"U"	J$MiL	3:43
9.	"Section"	J$MiL	4:14
10.	"So Good (Get It Girl)"	J$MiL	4:10
11.	"Why So Serious"	M-16	4:15
12.	"Retarded"	J$MiL	3:37
