= I Can't Wait (Akon song) =

Single by Akon

from the album Konvicted
- Released: March 31, 2008
- Recorded: 2006
- Genre: R&B
- Length: 3:46
- Label: Konvict; Universal; UpFront; SRC
- Songwriters: Aliaune Thiam; Faheem Najm
- Producers: Akon; T-Pain

Akon singles chronology
"What You Got" (2008)	"I Can't Wait" (2008)	"Dangerous" (2008)

"I Can't Wait" is the seventh and final single from Senegalese-American singer Akon's second studio album, Konvicted. The song features additional uncredited vocals from American singer and rapper T-Pain. The song was released as a digital download only single on April 14, 2008. The song was added to and peaked at the C-list on BBC Radio 1's playlist. The song reached number 116 on the UK Singles Chart. The original version of the song was entitled "You Got Me", and was written for T-Pain's debut album, Rappa Ternt Sanga.

== Music video ==
The video consists of the same scene of Akon getting out of a Rolls-Royce Phantom Drophead Coupé and seeing a girl he likes. The first time he ignores the girl and walks into the club. He then arrives at another club and sees the girl for a second time and attempts to talk to her, but she is with another man. On the third attempt he is successful and walks home with the girl, entering her house with her. The chorus scenes involve Akon standing while T-Pain playing the piano, with a white Lamborghini Murciélago in the background.

== Track listing ==
1. "I Can't Wait" (Radio Edit) – 3:46

== Charts ==
Chart (2008)	Peak position
UK Singles Chart	116

== Certifications ==
Certifications for "I Can't Wait"
Region	Certification	Certified units/sales
New Zealand (RMNZ)	Gold	15,000^{‡}
^{‡} Sales+streaming figures based on certification alone.

== Release history ==
Country	Date	Format	Label
United Kingdom	April 11, 2008	Digital download	Konvict Muzik, SRC Records, Universal Motown
