= List of number-one R&B/hip-hop songs of 2007 (U.S.) =

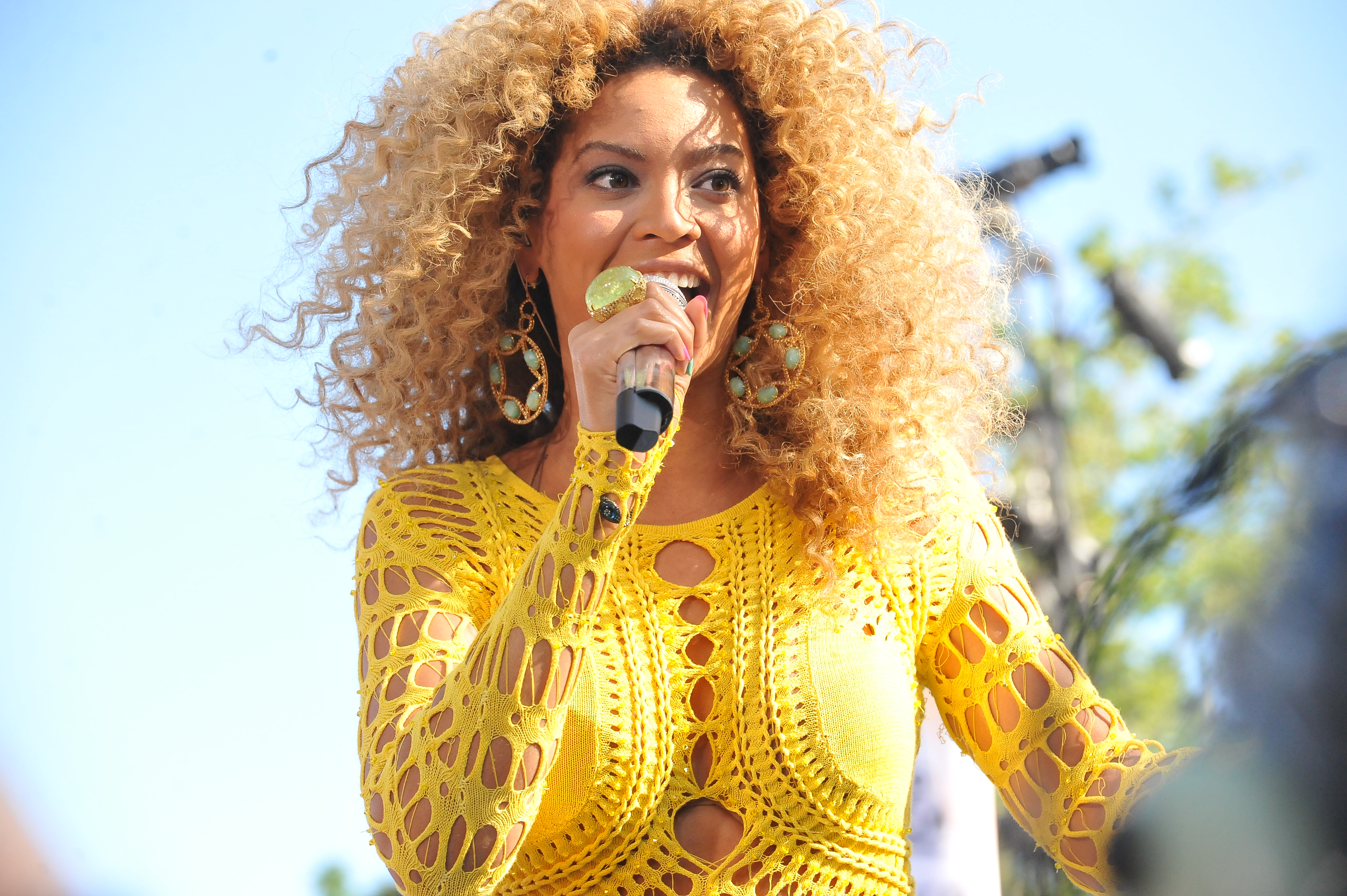
Beyoncé's "Irreplaceable" was at number one at the start of 2007.

These are the Billboard R&B singles chart number-one songs of 2007.

== Chart history ==
Key
†	Indicates best-charting R&B single of 2007

Issue date	Song	Artist(s)	Ref.
January 6	"Irreplaceable"	Beyoncé	
January 13	"Irreplaceable"	Beyoncé	
January 20	"Irreplaceable"	Beyoncé	
January 27	"Irreplaceable"	Beyoncé	
February 3	"Promise"	Ciara	
February 10	"Promise"	Ciara	
February 17	"You"	Lloyd featuring Lil Wayne	
February 24	"Lost Without U" †	Robin Thicke	
March 3	"Lost Without U" †	Robin Thicke	
March 10	"Lost Without U" †	Robin Thicke	
March 17	"Lost Without U" †	Robin Thicke	
March 24	"Lost Without U" †	Robin Thicke	
March 31	"Lost Without U" †	Robin Thicke	
April 7	"Lost Without U" †	Robin Thicke	
April 14	"Lost Without U" †	Robin Thicke	
April 21	"Lost Without U" †	Robin Thicke	
April 28	"Lost Without U" †	Robin Thicke	
May 5	"Lost Without U" †	Robin Thicke	
May 12	"Buy U a Drank (Shawty Snappin')"	T-Pain featuring Yung Joc	
May 19	"Buy U a Drank (Shawty Snappin')"	T-Pain featuring Yung Joc	
May 26	"Buy U a Drank (Shawty Snappin')"	T-Pain featuring Yung Joc	
June 2	"Buy U a Drank (Shawty Snappin')"	T-Pain featuring Yung Joc	
June 9	"Buy U a Drank (Shawty Snappin')"	T-Pain featuring Yung Joc	
June 16	"Buy U a Drank (Shawty Snappin')"	T-Pain featuring Yung Joc	
June 23	"Buy U a Drank (Shawty Snappin')"	T-Pain featuring Yung Joc	
June 30	"Buy U a Drank (Shawty Snappin')"	T-Pain featuring Yung Joc	
July 7	"When I See U"	Fantasia	
July 14	"When I See U"	Fantasia	
July 21	"When I See U"	Fantasia	
July 28	"When I See U"	Fantasia	
August 4	"When I See U"	Fantasia	
August 11	"When I See U"	Fantasia	
August 18	"When I See U"	Fantasia	
August 25	"When I See U"	Fantasia	
September 1	"Let It Go"	Keyshia Cole featuring Missy Elliott and Lil' Kim	
September 8	"Let It Go"	Keyshia Cole featuring Missy Elliott and Lil' Kim	
September 15	"Let It Go"	Keyshia Cole featuring Missy Elliott and Lil' Kim	
September 22	"Bed"	J. Holiday	
September 29	"Bed"	J. Holiday	
October 6	"Bed"	J. Holiday	
October 13	"Bed"	J. Holiday	
October 20	"Bed"	J. Holiday	
October 27	"No One"	Alicia Keys	
November 3	"No One"	Alicia Keys	
November 10	"No One"	Alicia Keys	
November 17	"No One"	Alicia Keys	
November 24	"No One"	Alicia Keys	
December 1	"No One"	Alicia Keys	
December 8	"No One"	Alicia Keys	
December 15	"No One"	Alicia Keys	
December 22	"No One"	Alicia Keys	
December 29	"No One"	Alicia Keys	

== See also ==
- 2007 in music
- Billboard Year-End Hot R&B/Hip-Hop Songs of 2007
- List of number-one R&B hits (United States)
