= Konvicted =

Studio album by Akon
- Released: November 14, 2006
- Recorded: April 2005–June 2006
- Studios: White Room Studios, Detroit, Michigan
- Genres: R&B; hip-hop; reggae
- Length: 48:05
- Labels: Konvict; UpFront; SRC; Universal Motown
- Producers: Akon; Eminem; Giorgio Tuinfort; Lil Jon; Rune Rask; Troo.L.S; Ghulam Sajid; T-Pain

Akon chronology
Trouble (2004)	Konvicted (2006)	Freedom (2008)

Singles from Konvicted
- 1. "Smack That" Released: September 26, 2006; 2. "I Wanna Love You" Released: October 5, 2006; 3. "Don't Matter" Released: January 18, 2007; 4. "Mama Africa" Released: May 15, 2007; 5. "Sorry, Blame It on Me" Released: July 17, 2007; 6. "Never Took the Time" Released: October 16, 2007; 7. "I Can't Wait" Released: March 31, 2008

Konvicted is the second studio album by Senegalese-American singer-songwriter Akon. It was released on November 14, 2006, by Konvict Muzik, UpFront Megatainment, SRC Records, Universal Records and Motown Records. The album features collaborations with Eminem, Snoop Dogg, Styles P and T-Pain.

Konvicted debuted at number two on the US Billboard 200, selling 284,000 copies in its first week. It was later certified 6× Platinum by the Recording Industry Association of America (RIAA), also resulting in it being Akon's best selling album worldwide. The album was nominated for three Grammy Awards in two categories, Best Contemporary R&B Album and Best Rap/Sung Collaboration.

== Background ==
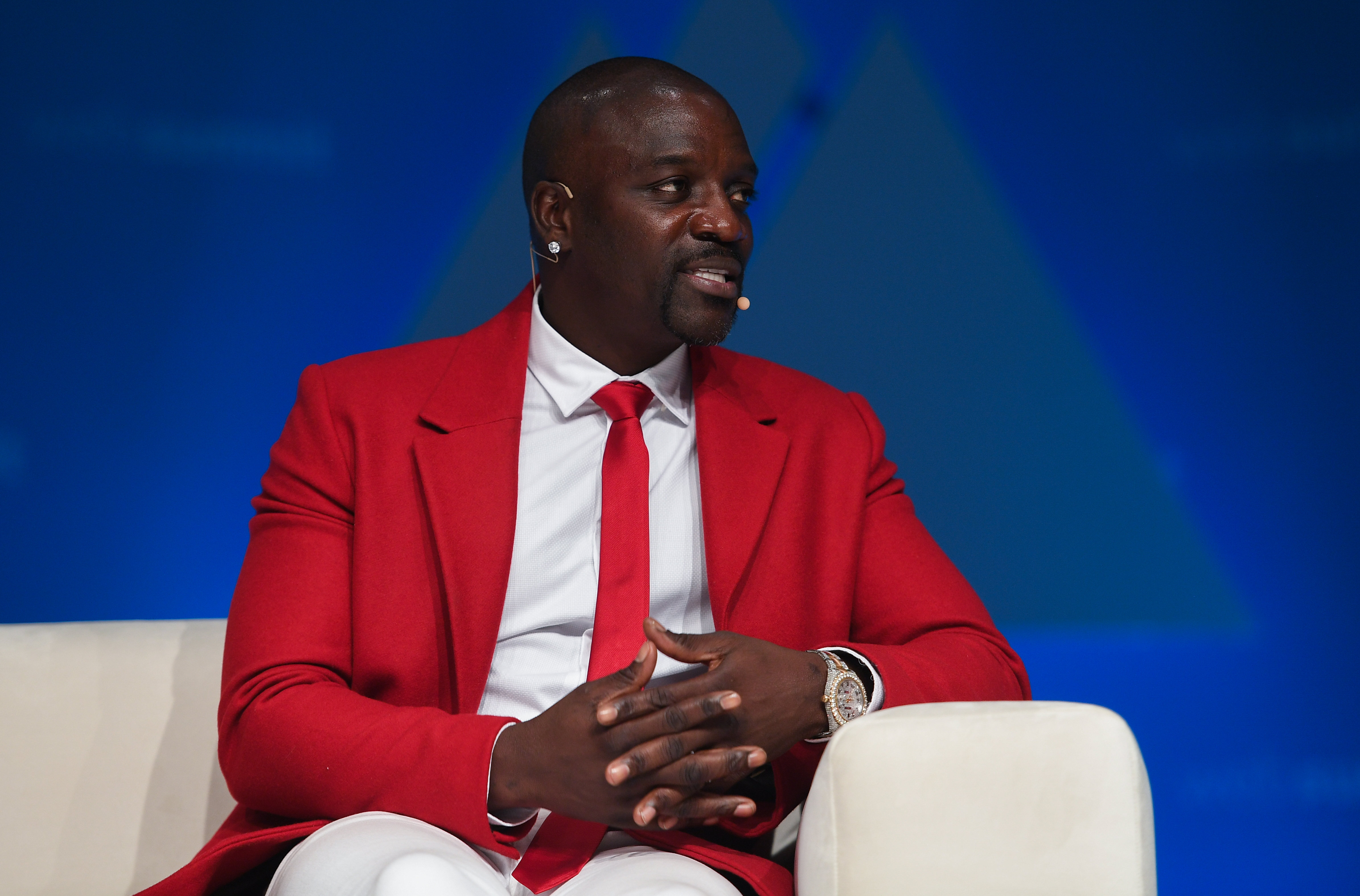
Akon produced most tracks on Konvicted

The album's title refers to Akon supposedly spending three years in prison from 1999 to 2002 for being part of an auto-theft ring.

Akon discussed the making of the album in a 2022 track-by-track video. Talking about its music he said: “When I first started in the music business I started as a producer. But as a producer I was also a ghost producer. Konvicted was a way of merging all of those sounds in one, because I grew up listening to everything and anybody, but also creating sounds for a lot of producers”. The singer said that the album's lyrics were based on his personal life's experiences.

== Music and lyrics ==
Konvicted musically mixes R&B, hip hop and reggae. According to AllMusic, its lyrical production mostly "offers more ultra-macho R&B", while still delivering introspective content. The Guardian noted that Akon in the album portrays a more hip-hop persona unlike his R&B contemporaries, usually conformed in more romantic productions. Akon on Konvicted delivers for the most part his signature "warm, nasal" vocal performances.

== Release and singles ==
The album was accompanied by several different bonus tracks depending on territory. In the UK, the track "Gringo" was issued. "Gringo" also became a bonus track for Target customers in the US. In Japan, the UK B-Side "Struggle Everyday" became the final track on the album. "Struggle Everyday" also became a bonus track for Circuit City customers in the US. All digital versions of the album come accompanied by a remix of "I Wanna Love You", featuring Snoop Dogg and Eminem.

Walmart customers in the US were treated to four exclusive bonus tracks, including unreleased tracks "Fair to You" and "Still Alone", plus Walmart Live Soundcheck versions of "Mama Africa" and "I Wanna Love You". The Platinum Edition of the album, issued in 2007, came complete with the new single "Sorry Blame It On Me", a new track entitled "Rush", and a remix of "Don't Matter". Some editions of the album also came packaged with a bonus DVD, containing a thirty-minute documentary and three music videos. "Smack That", "I Wanna Love You" and "Don't Matter" were certified 3× platinum by RIAA. Also "Never Took the Time" was released as promotional single on October 16, 2007.

== Critical reception ==
Professional ratings
Review scores
Source	Rating
AllMusic	3/5 stars
DJBooth.net	4.5/5 stars
Entertainment Weekly	B
The Guardian	4/5 stars
HipHopDX	3/5 stars
Robert Christgau	(3-star Honorable Mention)
Rolling Stone	3/5 stars
Spin	(6/10)
Sputnikmusic	2.5/5 stars
USA Today	3/4 stars

The Guardian praised Akon's vocal performances on Konvicted: “His voice is wonderful, an instrument of silky versatility; it's arresting to hear tales of strippers, jail and drug dealing, interspersed with the occasional bout of chest-beating angst, sung in such a seductive style.” Spin commented that the album “works like a backpacker’s version of a tough-guy hip-hop album”. Robert Christgau wrote that it “answers the burning question of whether R. Kelly's priorities would be improved by hard time more ambiguously than one would hope”. Rolling Stone talking about its lyrics, said that “while crooners like Usher and Ne-Yo sing to the ladies, Akon sings for the guys”.

== Chart performance ==
Konvicted debuted at number two on the Billboard 200 chart, selling over 284,000 copies that week. The album was able to stay within the top twenty for 28 consecutive weeks, but eventually started to drop slowly. On November 19, 2007, the RIAA certified Konvicted 3× platinum status with 3 million units sold in the United States. In 2007, the album became the second best selling record of the year in the U.S., behind Daughtry by Daughtry.

== Controversy surrounding convicted felon image ==
Despite his history of presenting himself as a convicted felon, which has even included him claiming to have at one point in time been the leader of car theft ring, it has been acknowledged that Akon had in fact fictionalized his criminal history, with his only criminal conviction by this point in time being in 1998 for a gun charge which resulted in him only receiving three years probation and no prison time.

== Track listing ==
No.	Title	Writer(s)	Producer(s)	Length
1.	"Shake Down"	Akon; Giorgio Tuinfort	Akon; Giorgio Tuinfort	3:52
2.	"Blown Away" (featuring Styles P)	Akon; Giorgio Tuinfort; David "Styles P" Styles	Giorgio Tuinfort; Akon	3:29
3.	"Smack That" (featuring Eminem)	Akon; Marshall Mathers; Luis Resto; Mike Strange	Eminem	3:33
4.	"I Wanna Love You" (also known as "I Wanna Fuck You"; featuring Snoop Dogg)	Akon; Cordozar Broadus Jr.	Akon	4:07
5.	"The Rain"	Akon; Dwight "Skrapp" Reynolds; Theron Thomas; Timothy Thomas; S. Crocker	Akon	3:27
6.	"Never Took the Time"	Akon; Keon Bryce; Steve Skinner	Akon	3:57
7.	"Mama Africa"	Akon; Hakim Abdulsamad; Dalton Brownie; Bobby Dixon; Everold Dwyer; Paul Elton; Bruce Gowdy; Tilmann Otto; Dave Richards	Akon	4:26
8.	"I Can't Wait" (featuring T-Pain)	Akon; Faheem Najm	Akon, T-Pain	3:46
9.	"Gangsta Bop"	Akon; T. Nielsen; Rune Rask	Akon; Troo.L.S; Rask	4:06
10.	"Tired of Runnin'"	Akon; H. Banks; C. Hampton; R. Jackson	Akon	4:33
11.	"Once in a While"	Akon; Brian "Benny Demus" Boulai; Skip Prokop	Benny-D; Akon	3:57
12.	"Don't Matter"	Akon; Bob Marley; A. Lawson	Akon	4:53
Total length:				48:05

Konvicted: Platinum Edition bonus tracks
No.	Title	Writer(s)	Producer(s)	Length
13.	"Sorry, Blame It on Me"	Akon; Clinton Sparks; S. Patrone	Clinton Sparks	4:56
14.	"Rush" (featuring Kardinal Offishall)	Akon; Jason Harrow; Andrew Joel Thompson	Akon	4:14
15.	"Don't Matter" (Calypso Remix)	Akon; Bob Marley; A. Lawson	Akon	5:37
16.	"Gringo"	Akon	Akon	4:30
17.	"I Wanna Love You" (clean version; featuring Snoop Dogg)	Akon; Cordozar Broadus Jr.	Akon	4:07
Total length:				62:52

UK bonus tracks
No.	Title	Writer(s)	Producer(s)	Length
13.	"Gringo"	Akon	Akon	4:30
14.	"I Wanna Love You" (clean version; featuring Snoop Dogg)	Akon; Cordozar Broadus Jr.	Akon; Lil Jon	4:07

Circuit City and Japanese bonus track
No.	Title	Length
13.	"Struggle Everyday"	4:16

Digital bonus track
No.	Title	Length
13.	"I Wanna Love You" (remix; featuring Snoop Dogg and Tego Calderón)	3:56

Walmart bonus tracks
No.	Title	Length
13.	"Fair to You"	3:21
14.	"Still Alone"	2:46
15.	"Mama Africa" (Walmart Soundcheck version – live)	4:45
16.	"I Wanna Love You" (Walmart Soundcheck version – live)	4:37

Deluxe edition bonus DVD
No.	Title	Length
1.	"The Journey" (documentary)
2.	"Smack That" (music video)
3.	"I Wanna Love You" (music video)
4.	"Don't Matter" (music video)

== Personnel ==
- Akon – production, executive producer
- Devyne Stephens – executive producer, creative direction
- Rawle Stewart – co–executive producer
- Eddy Schreyer – mastering
- Joe Spix – art direction, art design
- Jonathan Mannion – photography
- Fiskani – wardrobe stylist
- Cragg Brown – coordinator

== Charts ==
=== Weekly charts ===
Chart (2006–07)	Peak position
Australian Albums (ARIA)	16
Australian Urban Albums (ARIA)	3
Belgian Albums (Ultratop Flanders)	33
Belgian Albums (Ultratop Wallonia)	39
Canadian Albums (Billboard)	4
Czech Albums (IFPI)	23
Danish Albums (Hitlisten)	31
Dutch Albums (Album Top 100)	51
French Albums (SNEP)	7
German Albums (Offizielle Top 100)	75
Hungarian Albums (MAHASZ)	30
Irish Albums (IRMA)	12
Japanese Albums (Oricon)	18
New Zealand Albums (RMNZ)	1
Norwegian Albums (VG-lista)	13
Scottish Albums (Official Charts)	27
Swedish Albums (Sverigetopplistan)	41
Swiss Albums (Schweizer Hitparade)	23
UK Albums (Official Charts)	16
UK R&B Albums (Official Charts)	2
US Billboard 200	2
US Top R&B/Hip-Hop Albums (Billboard)	2

Chart (2025)	Peak position
Portuguese Albums (AFP)	160

=== Year-end charts ===
Chart (2006)	Position
French Albums (SNEP)	116
UK Albums (OCC)	137

Chart (2007)	Position
Australian Albums (ARIA)	69
Belgian Albums (Ultratop Flanders)	91
French Albums (SNEP)	64
New Zealand Albums (RMNZ)	17
UK Albums (OCC)	53
US Billboard 200	2
US Top R&B/Hip-Hop Albums (Billboard)	2

== Certifications ==
Region	Certification	Certified units/sales
Australia (ARIA)	Platinum	70,000^{^}
Brazil (Pro-Música Brasil)	Platinum	60,000^{*}
Canada (Music Canada)	2× Platinum	200,000^{^}
Denmark (IFPI Danmark)	2× Platinum	40,000^{‡}
France (SNEP)	Gold	75,000^{*}
Germany (BVMI)	Gold	100,000^{‡}
Ireland (IRMA)	Platinum	15,000^{^}
Japan (RIAJ)	Gold	100,000^{^}
New Zealand (RMNZ)	4× Platinum	60,000^{‡}
Poland (ZPAV)	Gold	10,000^{*}
Russia (NFPF)	Platinum	20,000^{*}
Singapore (RIAS)	Gold	5,000^{*}
Switzerland (IFPI Switzerland)	Gold	15,000^{^}
United Kingdom (BPI)	2× Platinum	600,000^{‡}
United States (RIAA)	6× Platinum	6,000,000^{‡}
^{*} Sales figures based on certification alone.^{^} Shipments figures based on certification alone.^{‡} Sales+streaming figures based on certification alone.
