= List of Billboard Hot 100 number ones of 2007 =

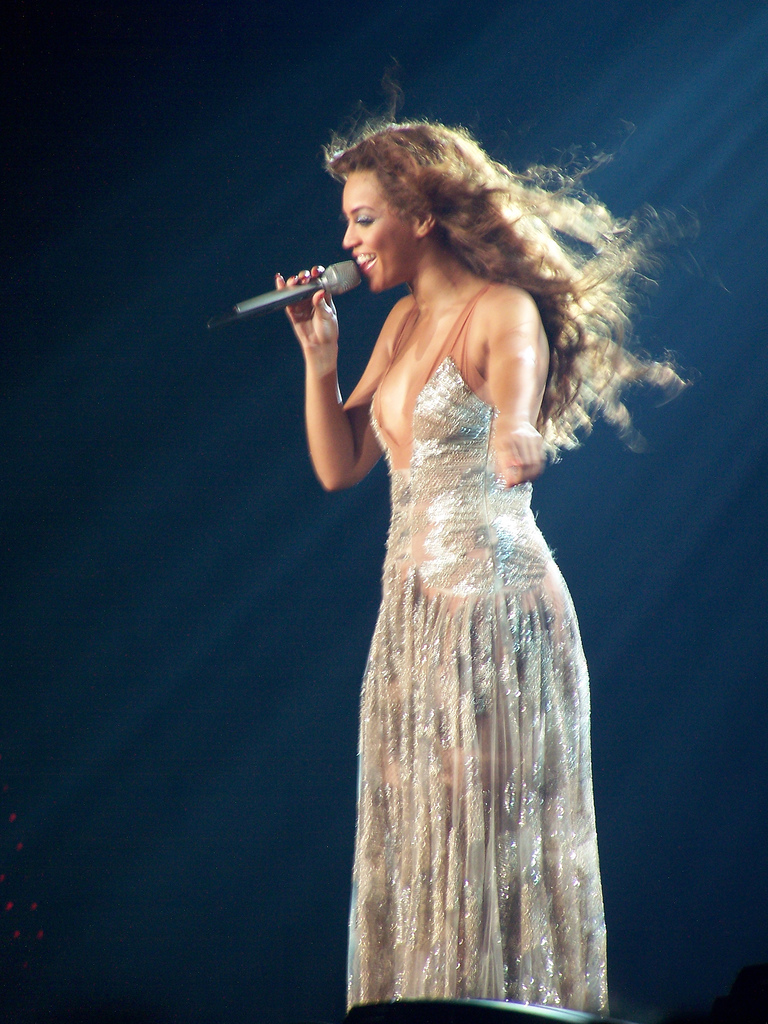
Beyoncé's "Irreplaceable" was the best-performing single of the year, topping the Top Hot 100 Hits of 2007.

The Billboard Hot 100 is a chart that ranks the best-performing singles of the United States. Published by Billboard magazine, the data are compiled by Nielsen SoundScan based collectively on each single's weekly physical and digital sales, and airplay. In 2007, 17 singles reached the top spot on the chart. An 18th single, Beyoncé's "Irreplaceable", began a run at the top in 2006 which continued into 2007.

In 2007, eight acts achieved their first US number-one single, either as a lead artist or featured guest: Mims, Avril Lavigne, Maroon 5, T-Pain, Yung Joc, Plain White T's, Sean Kingston, and Soulja Boy Tell 'Em. Producer Timbaland earned his first number-one single as lead artist with "Give It to Me"; he had previously appeared as featured guest on singer Nelly Furtado's number-one single "Promiscuous". T-Pain, Justin Timberlake, Nelly Furtado and Fergie each earned two number-one singles, either as a lead artist or featured guest.

Three number-one singles tied for the longest run on the chart in 2007: Beyoncé's "Irreplaceable", Rihanna's "Umbrella", and Soulja Boy Tell 'Em's "Crank That (Soulja Boy)" all topped the chart for seven weeks; the last of these was non-consecutive. However, "Irreplaceable", which started its peak position in three issues the previous year, is credited to by Billboard magazine as 2006's longest-running single. To this effect, "Umbrella" and "Crank That (Soulja Boy)" are the longest-running singles of 2007. Other singles with extended chart runs include singer Alicia Keys' "No One" which stayed at number one for five straight weeks.

"Irreplaceable" is the best-performing single of the calendar year, topping the Year-End Hot 100 singles of 2007 for seven consecutive weeks. Band Maroon 5's "Makes Me Wonder" is noted for its jump from 64th to 1st place on the Billboard Hot 100, making it the largest leap of 2007. "Umbrella", which occupied the top slot for seven of summer's thirteen weeks, has been credited by the music press as 2007's Song of the Summer.

== Chart history ==
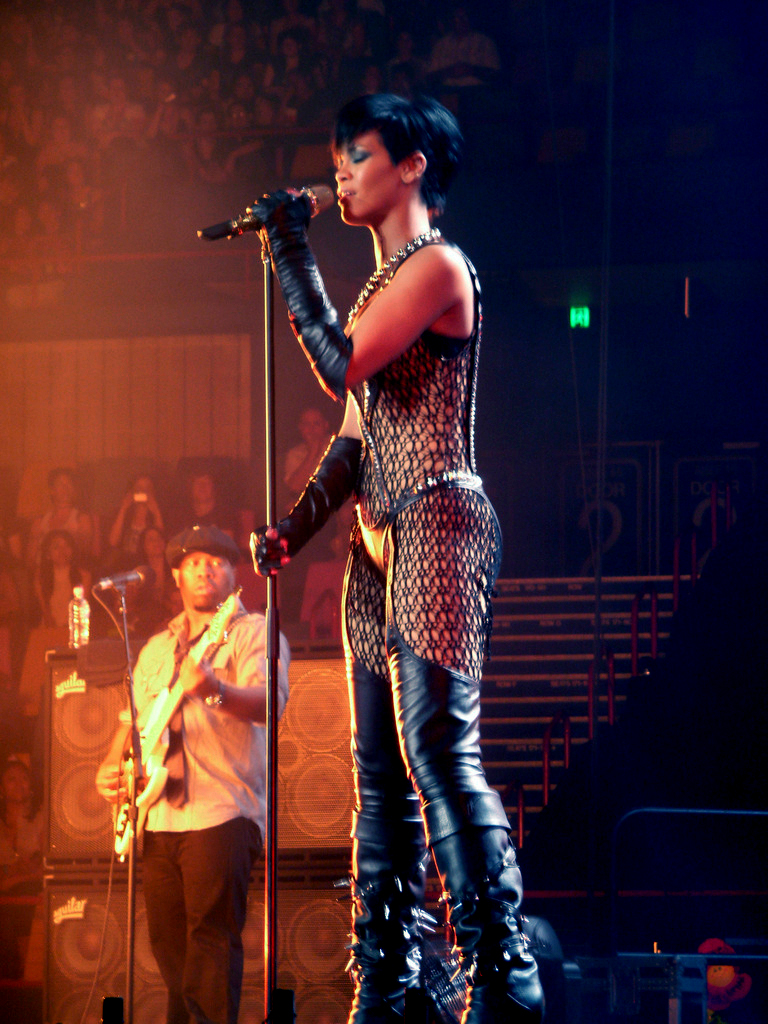
Singer Rihanna's "Umbrella" spent seven straight weeks on the Billboard Hot 100, becoming one of the three longest-running singles of the year, with Irreplaceable and Crank That (Soulja Boy).

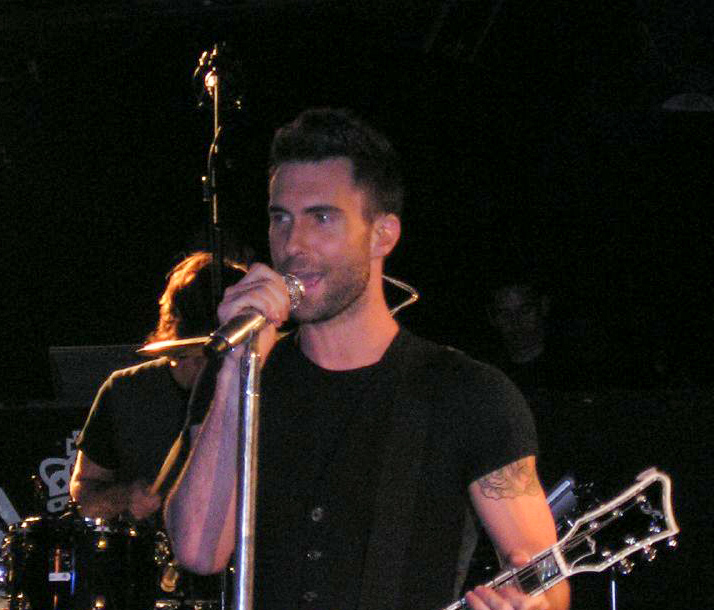
Band Maroon 5's "Makes Me Wonder" is noted for its jump from 64th to first place on the Billboard Hot 100, making it the biggest leap in this year.

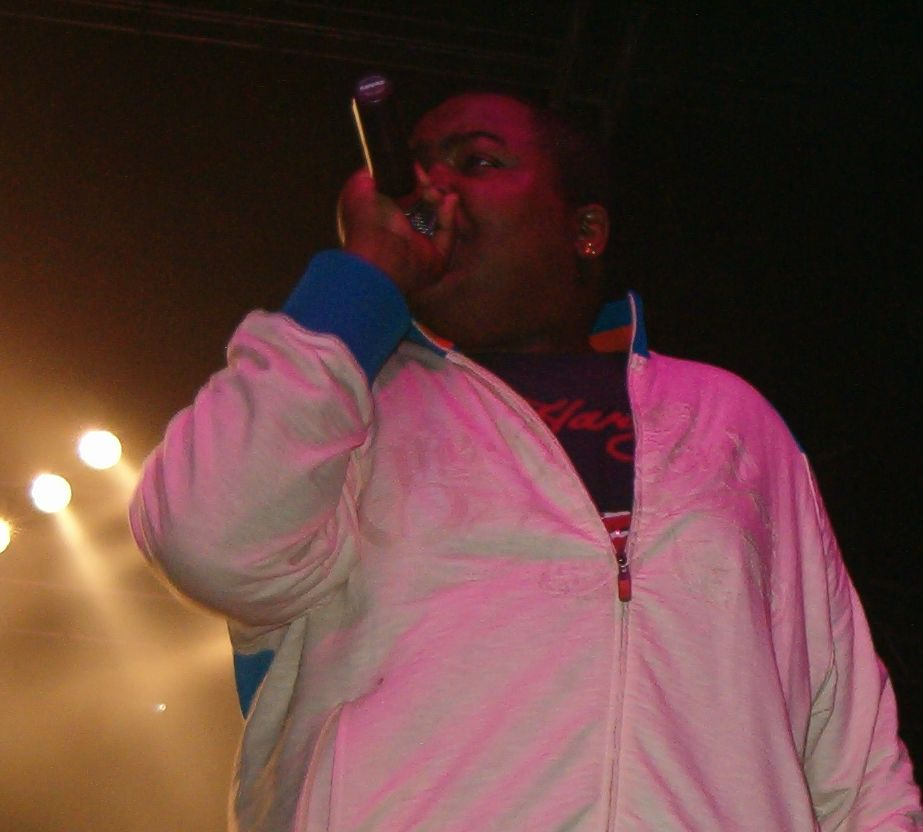
Rapper Sean Kingston earned his first number-one single in U.S. with "Beautiful Girls" for four consecutive weeks.

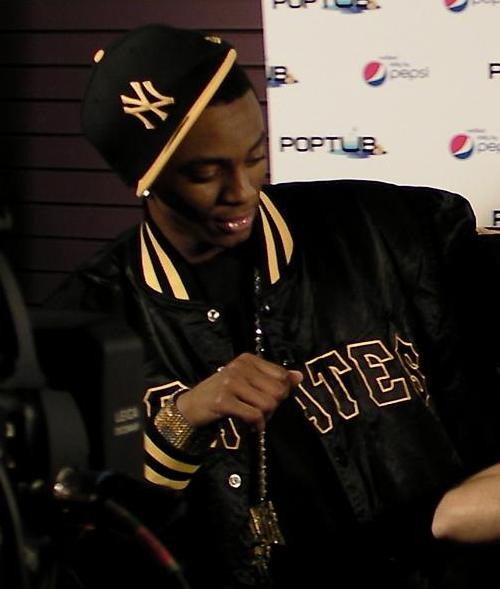
Rapper Soulja Boy gained his first number-one single in U.S. "Crank That" for seven nonconsecutive weeks.

Key
†	Indicates best-performing single of 2007

No.	Issue date	Song	Artist(s)	Reference
936	January 6	"Irreplaceable"†	Beyoncé	
936	January 13	"Irreplaceable"†	Beyoncé	
936	January 20	"Irreplaceable"†	Beyoncé	
936	January 27	"Irreplaceable"†	Beyoncé	
936	February 3	"Irreplaceable"†	Beyoncé	
936	February 10	"Irreplaceable"†	Beyoncé	
936	February 17	"Irreplaceable"†	Beyoncé	
937	February 24	"Say It Right"	Nelly Furtado	
938	March 3	"What Goes Around...Comes Around"	Justin Timberlake	
939	March 10	"This Is Why I'm Hot"	Mims	
939	March 17	"This Is Why I'm Hot"	Mims	
940	March 24	"Glamorous"	Fergie featuring Ludacris	
940	March 31	"Glamorous"	Fergie featuring Ludacris	
941	April 7	"Don't Matter"	Akon	
941	April 14	"Don't Matter"	Akon	
942	April 21	"Give It to Me"	Timbaland featuring Nelly Furtado and Justin Timberlake	
942	April 28	"Give It to Me"	Timbaland featuring Nelly Furtado and Justin Timberlake	
943	May 5	"Girlfriend"	Avril Lavigne	
944	May 12	"Makes Me Wonder"	Maroon 5	
944	May 19	"Makes Me Wonder"	Maroon 5	
945	May 26	"Buy U a Drank (Shawty Snappin')"	T-Pain featuring Yung Joc	
re	June 2	"Makes Me Wonder"	Maroon 5	
946	June 9	"Umbrella"	Rihanna featuring Jay-Z	
946	June 16	"Umbrella"	Rihanna featuring Jay-Z	
946	June 23	"Umbrella"	Rihanna featuring Jay-Z	
946	June 30	"Umbrella"	Rihanna featuring Jay-Z	
946	July 7	"Umbrella"	Rihanna featuring Jay-Z	
946	July 14	"Umbrella"	Rihanna featuring Jay-Z	
946	July 21	"Umbrella"	Rihanna featuring Jay-Z	
947	July 28	"Hey There Delilah"	Plain White T's	
947	August 4	"Hey There Delilah"	Plain White T's	
948	August 11	"Beautiful Girls"	Sean Kingston	
948	August 18	"Beautiful Girls"	Sean Kingston	
948	August 25	"Beautiful Girls"	Sean Kingston	
948	September 1	"Beautiful Girls"	Sean Kingston	
949	September 8	"Big Girls Don't Cry"	Fergie	
950	September 15	"Crank That (Soulja Boy)"	Soulja Boy Tell 'Em	
950	September 22	"Crank That (Soulja Boy)"	Soulja Boy Tell 'Em	
951	September 29	"Stronger"	Kanye West	
re	October 6	"Crank That (Soulja Boy)"	Soulja Boy Tell 'Em	
re	October 13	"Crank That (Soulja Boy)"	Soulja Boy Tell 'Em	
re	October 20	"Crank That (Soulja Boy)"	Soulja Boy Tell 'Em	
re	October 27	"Crank That (Soulja Boy)"	Soulja Boy Tell 'Em	
re	November 3	"Crank That (Soulja Boy)"	Soulja Boy Tell 'Em	
952	November 10	"Kiss Kiss"	Chris Brown featuring T-Pain	
952	November 17	"Kiss Kiss"	Chris Brown featuring T-Pain	
952	November 24	"Kiss Kiss"	Chris Brown featuring T-Pain	
953	December 1	"No One"	Alicia Keys	
953	December 8	"No One"	Alicia Keys	
953	December 15	"No One"	Alicia Keys	
953	December 22	"No One"	Alicia Keys	
953	December 29	"No One"	Alicia Keys	

== Number-one artists ==
List of number-one artists by total weeks at number one
Position	Artist	Weeks at No. 1
1	Beyoncé	7
1	Rihanna	7
1	Jay-Z	7
1	Soulja Boy Tell 'Em	7
5	Alicia Keys	5
6	T-Pain	4
6	Sean Kingston	4
8	Nelly Furtado	3
8	Justin Timberlake	3
8	Fergie	3
8	Maroon 5	3
8	Chris Brown	3
13	Mims	2
13	Ludacris	2
13	Akon	2
13	Timbaland	2
13	Plain White T's	2
18	Avril Lavigne	1
18	Young Joc	1
18	Kanye West	1

== See also ==
- 2007 in music
- List of Billboard number-one singles
- Billboard Year-End Hot 100 singles of 2007
- List of Billboard Hot 100 number-one singles of the 2000s

== Additional sources ==
- Fred Bronson's Billboard Book of Number 1 Hits, 5th Edition (ISBN 0-8230-7677-6)
- Joel Whitburn's Top Pop Singles 1955-2008, 12 Edition (ISBN 0-89820-180-2)
- Joel Whitburn Presents the Billboard Hot 100 Charts: The 2000s (ISBN 0-89820-182-9)
- Additional information obtained can be verified within Billboard's online archive services and print editions of the magazine.
