= Buy U a Drank (Shawty Snappin') =

2007 single by T-Pain

Single by T-Pain featuring Yung Joc

from the album Epiphany
- Released: March 10, 2007
- Recorded: 2006
- Genre: R&B; snap
- Length: 3:48
- Label: Nappy Boy; Konvict; Jive
- Songwriters: Faheem Najm; Jasiel Robinson; Jonathan Smith; Earl Stevens; Sean Paul Joseph; Darryl Richardson; Richard Sims; Jarvis Griffin; Reginald Jones; Miguel Willis; Alphonzo Bailey; Isaac Hayes III
- Producer: T-Pain

T-Pain singles chronology
"I'm a Flirt (Remix)" (2007)	"Buy U a Drank (Shawty Snappin')" (2007)	"Bartender" (2007)

Yung Joc singles chronology
"In the Hood" (2006)	"Buy U a Drank (Shawty Snappin')" (2007)	"Coffee Shop" (2007)

"Buy U a Drank (Shawty Snappin')" is a song by the American singer T-Pain featuring American rapper Yung Joc. Produced by T-Pain, it was released on March 10, 2007 as the lead single from his second album, Epiphany. It topped the US Billboard Hot 100 and reached the Top 20 in Australia and New Zealand.

== Background ==
T-Pain said during a USA Today interview that "Buy U a Drank" was "the first record where I was trying to make a hit song. I was going into the studio consciously like, 'What do people like talking about? They like drinking and they like drinking with girls. What do you say to a girl to get her a drink?'".

In 2020, T-Pain revealed during the talk show Hot Ones, that he teased the record to Chris Brown, who liked the song so much that he wanted it for himself: "Once I made ['Buy U a Drank'], I was so proud of it [that] I walked into Chris Brown's studio and showed it to Chris Brown. He tried to take it from me. He was like, 'Oh, my God... We've got to get this on [Exclusive].' And I was like, 'Yeah, man! For sure! Nah, whatever you want!' I was just defeated at that time, and as soon as I left out of that room, I was like, 'He's not ever hearing that song again.'"

== Critical reception ==
The song ranks 63rd on Rolling Stone's list of the 100 Best Songs of 2007. The magazine also ranked it as the 74th best R&B song of the 21st century. Cleveland.com commented that “T-Pain has told the story that “Buy U a Drank” was the first song he wrote intending to write a hit and it shows.”

== Chart performance ==
The song debuted on the Billboard Hot 100 at number 84 on the issue date of March 10, 2007. On the issue date of May 12, 2007 the single became T-Pain's first and Yung Joc's second number 1 single on Billboard's Hot R&B/Hip-Hop Songs chart. On the same Billboard magazine issue date, "Buy U a Drank (Shawty Snappin')" became T-Pain's highest-charting single on the Billboard Hot 100 to date, surpassing the number 5 peak of "I'm 'n Luv (Wit a Stripper)". On the issue date of May 26, 2007, "Buy U a Drank (Shawty Snappin')" reached number 1, becoming T-Pain as well as Yung Joc's first number 1 single on the Billboard Hot 100. The song was less popular in the United Kingdom, failing to appear on the official UK Singles Chart.

The song, which spent its chart run in each of the top 12 positions of the Hot 100, broke the record of "Truly Madly Deeply" by Savage Garden, which previously had been the only single in the history of the Hot 100 to spend time in each of the top 10 positions on the chart during its run.

== Music video ==
The music video was directed by Benny Boom. It premiered on April 9, 2007, on MTV and features cameos from various artists such as E-40, Gorilla Zoe, Huey, Tay Dizm, Ryan Shaw, Shawnna, Jay Lyriq, Kardinal Offishall, Brandon T. Jackson and many others.

== Charts ==
=== Weekly charts ===
Weekly chart performance for "Buy U a Drank (Shawty Snappin')"
Chart (2007)	Peak position
Australia (ARIA)	18
Australian Urban (ARIA)	5
Canada Hot 100 (Billboard)	25
New Zealand (Recorded Music NZ)	2
Portugal (AFP)	39
UK Singles (OCC)	112
US Billboard Hot 100	1
US Hot R&B/Hip-Hop Songs (Billboard)	1
US Pop Airplay (Billboard)	4
US Rhythmic Airplay (Billboard)	1

=== Year-end charts ===
Year-end chart performance for "Buy U a Drank (Shawty Snappin')"
Chart (2007)	Position
Australia (ARIA)	92
New Zealand (Recorded Music NZ)	4
US Billboard Hot 100	5
US R&B/Hip-Hop Songs (Billboard)	4
US Rhythmic (Billboard)	1

=== Decade-end charts ===
Decade-end chart performance for "Buy U a Drank (Shawty Snappin')"
Chart (2000–2009)	Position
US Billboard Hot 100	71

== Certifications ==
Certifications for "Buy U a Drank (Shawty Snappin')"
Region	Certification	Certified units/sales
Canada (Music Canada) Ringtone	Platinum	40,000^{*}
New Zealand (RMNZ)	Platinum	15,000^{*}
United Kingdom (BPI)	Platinum	600,000^{‡}
United States (RIAA)	7× Platinum	7,000,000^{‡}
United States (RIAA) Mastertone	3× Platinum	3,000,000^{*}
^{*} Sales figures based on certification alone.^{‡} Sales+streaming figures based on certification alone.

== Release history ==
Release dates and formats for "Buy U a Drank (Shawty Snappin')"
Region	Date	Format	Label(s)	Ref.
United States	April 17, 2007	Mainstream airplay	Jive	

== Remixes ==
"Buy U a Drank (Shawty Snappin')" (remix)

Single by T-Pain featuring Kanye West

from the album Epiphany and Can't Tell Me Nothing
- Released: July 16, 2007
- Recorded: 2006
- Genre: Hip hop; snap&B
- Length: 4:17; 4:32 (Part II remix with UGK)
- Label: Nappy Boy; Konvict; Jive
- Songwriters: Faheem Najm; Jasiel Robinson; Kanye West
- Producer: T-Pain

Kanye West and T-Pain singles chronology
"Buy U a Drank (Shawty Snappin')" (remix) (2007)	"Good Life" (2007)

The official remix on the single features rapper Kanye West and the part 2 of the remix has UGK with T-Pain and West. There are also other remixes that features Chingy, Trey Songz, Stat Quo, and T.I., respectively. There is also a remix with T-Pain, West, UGK and Trey Songz. Miami rapper Lil' Brianna sampled this record for a freestyle from her 2007 mixtape Princess of Miami.

A remixed version titled "I Like Dat" was released on May 14, 2021. It features T-Pain himself along with American singer Kehlani.

== See also ==
- List of Hot 100 number-one singles of 2007 (U.S.)
- List of number-one R&B singles of 2007 (U.S.)
