= Pop, Lock & Drop It =

Single by Huey

from the album Notebook Paper
- B-side: "Nobody Loves the Hood" (featuring Trey Songz)
- Released: September 19, 2006
- Recorded: 2006
- Genre: Crunk
- Length: 4:21
- Label: Jive; Hitz Committee; Polo Grounds
- Songwriters: Lawrence Franks Jr.; Dandre Smith, Calvin Miller Productions
- Producers: D. Smith, C. Miller

Music video
- "Pop, Lock & Drop It" on YouTube

"Pop, Lock & Drop It" is the only single by rapper Huey, released on September 19, 2006, from his debut album Notebook Paper. In early March 2007, "Pop, Lock, & Drop It" debuted on the Billboard Hot 100 at number 98, then later peaked at number six, becoming his first and only hit.

The song was a success on the 106 & Park countdown. Although it did not peak at number one, it stayed on the countdown for 51+ days. On March 8, 2007, rapper Bow Wow announced that he would be featured on the remix of the single, along with R&B singer T-Pain. The remix began receiving airplay in May of the same year. Another remix features Romeo.

Although "Pop, Lock & Drop It" is a song about a dance move, it is debated whether it refers to the process of firing a handgun. In physics, the 6th, 7th, and 8th derivatives of position are facetiously named pop, lock, and drop respectively. This video was featured on MTV Jams in mid-February 2007.

== Background ==
Huey's older brother referred him to producer Angela Richardson, who was creating a rap group. Huey's songs "Oh" and "Pop, Lock & Drop It" became local favorites among DJs and promoters. He was featured on a series of mixtapes, one of which, Unsigned Hype, sold out of its run of 8,000 copies and was noticed by producer TJ Chapman, who introduced the rapper to Vice President of A&R at Jive Records, Mickey "MeMpHiTz" Wright, in 2006. "Pop, Lock & Drop It", a heavy club track, was further popularised by its signature squatting dance move.

== Critical reception ==
In 2017, Danny Schwartz of HotNewHipHop named the song one of the biggest one-hit wonders of 2006, describing it as "a horny, high-octane crunk slapper that begins with a foreboding moment of musical uncertainty before plowing ahead with Huey's raunchy chants an irresistible call to hit the dance floor".

== Commercial performance ==
"Pop, Lock & Drop It" peaked at number six on the Billboard Hot 100 in 2007, charting for 23 weeks. The track climbed to number two on the Billboard Hot Rap Songs chart, where it stayed for over six months (27 weeks).

== Formats and track listing ==
US CD (promo)

1. "Pop, Lock & Drop It" (main version) – 4:23
2. "Pop, Lock & Drop It" (instrumental) – 4:17

US CD remix (promo)

1. "Pop, Lock & Drop It" (remix) (main version) (featuring Bow Wow and T-Pain) – 4:30
2. "Pop, Lock & Drop It" (remix) (instrumental) – 4:30
3. "Pop, Lock & Drop It (remix) (acappella) (featuring Bow Wow and T-Pain) – 4:30

US digital download

1. "Pop, Lock & Drop It" – 4:23

US digital download (remix)

1. "Pop, Lock & Drop It" (featuring Bow Wow and T-Pain) – 4:30

== Charts and certifications ==
=== Charts ===
Chart (2007)	Peak position
New Zealand (Recorded Music NZ)	10
US Billboard Hot 100	6
US Pop 100 (Billboard)	17
US Hot R&B/Hip-Hop Songs (Billboard)	6
US Hot Rap Songs (Billboard)	2
US Rhythmic Airplay (Billboard)	4

=== Certifications ===
Region	Certification	Certified units/sales
United States (RIAA)	2× Platinum	2,000,000^{^}
^{^} Shipments figures based on certification alone.

=== Year-end charts ===
Chart (2007)	Position
New Zealand (Recorded Music NZ)	50
US Billboard Hot 100	34
US Hot R&B/Hip-Hop Songs (Billboard)	35
US Rap Songs (Billboard)	12
US Rhythmic (Billboard)	22
