= Bartender (T-Pain song) =

2007 single by T-Pain

Single by T-Pain featuring Akon

from the album Epiphany
- Released: June 5, 2007
- Genre: R&B
- Length: 3:58
- Label: Nappy Boy; Konvict; Jive
- Songwriters: Faheem Najm; Aliaune Thiam
- Producer: T-Pain

T-Pain singles chronology
| "Know What I'm Doin'" (2006) | "Bartender" (2007) | "Shawty" (2007) |

Akon singles chronology
| "Mama Africa" (2007) | "Bartender" (2007) | "9mm" (2007) |

Music video
- "Bartender" on YouTube

"Bartender" is a song by American singer T-Pain featuring Senegalese-American singer Akon, released as the second single from the former's second album, Epiphany. The song debuted on the Billboard Hot 100 chart on the issue date of June 16, 2007, at number 97 and peaked at number 5 on September 22, 2007, making it T-Pain's fourth consecutive top 10 hit on the Billboard Hot 100 as well as Akon's ninth top 10 hit on the same chart. In 2008, the song was nominated for a Grammy Award for Best R&B Performance by a Duo or Group.

== Music video ==
The video, directed by Erik White, premiered on Yahoo! Music on June 13, 2007, as the Bonus Video. It features T-Pain dancing in front of a bar and flirting with the "bartender". BET's Access Granted also premiered the video on June 13, 2007. The video was filmed at the Fever Nightclub in Atlanta, Georgia.

== Charts ==
=== Weekly charts ===
| Chart (2007) | Peak position |
|---|---|
| Canada Hot 100 (Billboard) | 46 |
| Canada CHR/Top 40 (Billboard) | 13 |
| New Zealand (Recorded Music NZ) | 1 |
| UK Singles (OCC) | 104 |
| US Billboard Hot 100 | 5 |
| US Hot R&B/Hip-Hop Songs (Billboard) | 9 |
| US Pop Airplay (Billboard) | 9 |
| US Rhythmic Airplay (Billboard) | 1 |

=== Year-end charts ===
| Chart (2007) | Position |
|---|---|
| New Zealand (Recorded Music NZ) | 5 |
| US Billboard Hot 100 | 33 |
| US Hot R&B/Hip-Hop Songs (Billboard) | 51 |
| US Rhythmic (Billboard) | 2 |

== Certifications ==
| Region | Certification | Certified units/sales |
|---|---|---|
| New Zealand (RMNZ) | 5× Platinum | 150,000^{‡} |
| United Kingdom (BPI) | Silver | 200,000^{‡} |
| United States (RIAA) | 4× Platinum | 4,000,000^{‡} |
| United States (RIAA) Mastertone | Platinum | 1,000,000^{*} |
^{*} Sales figures based on certification alone.^{‡} Sales+streaming figures based on certification alone.

== Release history ==
Release dates and formats for "Bartender"
| Region | Date | Format | Label(s) | Ref. |
|---|---|---|---|---|
| United States | July 17, 2007 | Mainstream airplay | Jive | |

== Remixes ==
There are remixes featuring The-Dream, Chingy and Trae.

== See also ==
- "I Love U" - a song by The Chainsmokers from the album So Far So Good which contains interpolations of this song.
