= Don't Matter =

2007 single by Akon

Single by Akon

from the album Konvicted
- Released: January 19, 2007
- Genre: Reggae fusion; R&B
- Length: 4:54
- Label: Konvict; UpFront; SRC; Universal
- Songwriters: Aliaune Thiam; Anthony Lawson; Bob Marley
- Producer: Akon

Akon singles chronology
| "The Sweet Escape" (2006) | "Don't Matter" (2007) | "I Tried" (2007) |

Music video
- "Don't Matter" on YouTube

"Don't Matter" is a reggae fusion–R&B song by Senegalese-American singer Akon from his second studio album, Konvicted (2006). The song was released as the album's third single in January 2007. In April of that year, it became Akon's second U.S. number-one single. "Don't Matter" was ranked number 31 on Rolling Stone's list of the 100 Best Songs of 2007. This song was also ranked number 81 on MTV Asia's list of Top 100 Hits of 2007.

== Composition ==
"Don't Matter" was written by Akon and Anthony "Tony Love" Lawson, and produced by the former. Tony Love and another frequent Akon collaborator, Giorgio Tuinfort, played guitar and additional keyboards, respectively, on the song.

The chorus of "Don't Matter" is partially based on the 1979 Bob Marley and the Wailers song "Zimbabwe", with Bob Marley receiving an additional songwriting credit on the Akon track. According to Akon, "Don't Matter" was also influenced by Marley's 1974 song "No Woman, No Cry". "The topic matter, lyrically, is sad, but the song just makes you feel happy", Akon said of "No Woman, No Cry" in 2016, noting that he followed a similar approach when writing "Don't Matter"; he explained that its lyrics describe being "in a position when you're trying to hold a relationship together but the people around you don't really want it", but "the record still has a chorus that make you feel good. So I think those attributes probably stem from that subliminal standpoint". Music critics have also noted the song's melodic similarities with "Ignition (Remix)" (2002) by R. Kelly.

== Chart performance ==
"Don't Matter" was released in the United States in mid-January 2007. The song made its debut at number seventy-nine on the Billboard Hot 100 and reached number one after ten weeks on the chart, in large part due to its substantial airplay, the song topping the Hot 100 Airplay chart for two weeks. In the United Kingdom, it debuted on the singles chart at number forty-five, based solely upon downloads, and late peaking at number three following a physical release. Following the song's debut inside the top ten on the singles chart in Canada, it peaked at number one for a period of three weeks. As of January 2008, the song has been certified 3 times platinum for 3,000,000 digital sales. Bizzy Bone made a remix with this song, so did Candace Jones, Jadiel and Nivea. As of 2011, the song has sold 5,600,000 copies both in the United States and internationally.

== Music video ==
The video was directed by Gil Green and starts with Akon picking up his date at a location. As he leaves with this date, an old man (presumably a relative of the date) is shown both reading a magazine about Akon partying at local clubs and staring at the two with an angry look. The video continues with Akon singing "Don't Matter" throughout the course of his date. It is set in a Caribbean beach style community at social places such as the beach, village market, and a dance.

In the video's final scene, the music becomes much more lively, with a Caribbean style rhythm playing under the song's chorus. It has a cameo appearance by Cuban-American rapper Pitbull.

== Track listing ==
UK CD single and European CD single 1

1. "Don't Matter" – 4:09
2. "Shake Down" (Remix) (Feat. Red Cafe) – 4:28

European CD single 2

1. "Don't Matter" (Konvict Remix) – 5:46
2. "Don't Matter" (Calypso Remix) – 5:38
3. "Don't Matter" (Original Radio Edit) – 4:09
4. "Don't Matter" (Video) – 4:15

Australian CD single

1. "Don't Matter" (Radio Edit) – 3:02
2. "Shake Down" (Remix) (Feat. Red Cafe) – 4:28
3. "Easy Road" – 3:59
4. "Don't Matter" (Video) – 4:15

== Release history ==
| Region | Date |
|---|---|
| United States | January 19, 2007 |
| Australia | June 30, 2007 |
| United Kingdom | May 7, 2007 |

== Charts ==
=== Weekly charts ===
| Chart (2007) | Peak position |
|---|---|
| Australia (ARIA) | 9 |
| Australian Urban (ARIA) | 3 |
| Austria (Ö3 Austria Top 40) | 31 |
| Belgium (Ultratip Bubbling Under Flanders) | 21 |
| Belgium (Ultratip Bubbling Under Wallonia) | 14 |
| Brazil (Crowley Broadcast Analysis) | 1 |
| Canada Hot 100 (Billboard) | 4 |
| CIS Airplay (TopHit) | 26 |
| Czech Republic Airplay (ČNS IFPI) | 9 |
| Denmark (Tracklisten) | 18 |
| Europe (Eurochart Hot 100) | 6 |
| France (SNEP) | 6 |
| Germany (GfK) | 29 |
| Hungary (Rádiós Top 40) | 1 |
| Hungary (Dance Top 40) | 26 |
| Ireland (IRMA) | 1 |
| Netherlands (Dutch Top 40) | 15 |
| Netherlands (Single Top 100) | 23 |
| New Zealand (Recorded Music NZ) | 1 |
| Norway (VG-lista) | 7 |
| Romania (Romanian Top 100) | 1 |
| Russia Airplay (TopHit) | 34 |
| Scottish Singles Sales (Official Charts) | 5 |
| Slovakia Airplay (ČNS IFPI) | 3 |
| Sweden (Sverigetopplistan) | 23 |
| Switzerland (Schweizer Hitparade) | 19 |
| UK Singles (Official Charts) | 3 |
| UK Hip Hop/R&B (Official Charts) | 1 |
| US Billboard Hot 100 | 1 |
| US Adult Pop Airplay (Billboard) | 29 |
| US Adult R&B Songs (Billboard) | 16 |
| US Hot Latin Songs (Billboard) | 21 |
| US Pop Airplay (Billboard) | 3 |
| US Hot R&B/Hip-Hop Songs (Billboard) | 5 |
| US Rhythmic Airplay (Billboard) | 1 |

=== Year-end charts ===
| Chart (2007) | Position |
|---|---|
| Australia (ARIA) | 62 |
| Brazil (Crowley) | 2 |
| CIS (TopHit) | 106 |
| Europe (Eurochart Hot 100) | 67 |
| France (SNEP) | 83 |
| Hungary (Rádiós Top 40) | 6 |
| Netherlands (Dutch Top 40) | 98 |
| New Zealand (RIANZ) | 12 |
| Romania (Romanian Top 100) | 8 |
| Russia Airplay (TopHit) | 128 |
| Switzerland (Schweizer Hitparade) | 84 |
| UK Singles (OCC) | 40 |
| US Billboard Hot 100 | 11 |
| US Hot R&B/Hip-Hop Songs (Billboard) | 49 |
| US Rhythmic Airplay (Billboard) | 14 |

== Certifications ==
| Region | Certification | Certified units/sales |
|---|---|---|
| Brazil (Pro-Música Brasil) DMS | Platinum | 60,000^{*} |
| Brazil (Pro-Música Brasil) | Diamond | 250,000^{‡} |
| Canada (Music Canada) Ringtone | 3× Platinum | 120,000^{*} |
| Denmark (IFPI Danmark) | Platinum | 90,000^{‡} |
| Japan (RIAJ) | Gold | 100,000^{*} |
| New Zealand (RMNZ) | 4× Platinum | 120,000^{‡} |
| United Kingdom (BPI) | Platinum | 600,000^{‡} |
| United States (RIAA) | 6× Platinum | 6,000,000^{‡} |
| United States (RIAA) Mastertone | 3× Platinum | 3,000,000^{*} |
^{*} Sales figures based on certification alone.^{‡} Sales+streaming figures based on certification alone.

== Covers and sampling ==
Fall Out Boy performed a cover of "Don't Matter" for their live album, **** Live in Phoenix. They also performed the song at their June 12, 2007, concert, the night after their bassist Pete Wentz got in a fight with a fan. Canadian singer Lights often covered the song for her live shows. Brazilian singer Claudia Leitte did a cover of "Don't Matter" live in Festival de Verão Salvador with Akon in January 2010.

Brazilian band Bonde do Maluco also did a cover version of "Don't Matter" which has the chorus used by Claudia Leitte on her live version with Akon.

Lauv covered the song on his 2017 release Spotify Singles.

D'Prince and Kehlani interpolate "Don't Matter" in their songs "Bestie" (2015) and "Undercover" (2017), respectively.

== See also ==
- List of Canadian number-one singles of 2001–07
- List of number-one singles of 2007 (Ireland)
- List of number-one singles from the 2000s (New Zealand)
- List of Romanian Top 100 number ones of the 2000s
- List of Hot 100 number-one singles of 2007 (U.S.)
