= Huey (rapper) =

American rapper (1987–2020)

Background information
- Also known as: Baby Huey
- Born: Lawrence Franks Jr. September 12, 1987; Kinloch, Missouri, U.S.
- Died: June 26, 2020 (aged 32) Kinloch, Missouri, U.S.
- Genres: Hip hop
- Occupation: Rapper
- Years active: 2006–2020
- Labels: Bricksquad Monopoly (2013); Hitz Committee; Jive; Que; EMI

Lawrence Franks Jr. (September 12, 1987 – June 26, 2020), better known by his stage name Huey, was an American rapper from St. Louis, Missouri. Originally signed to Jive Records, Huey was best known for his 2006 single, "Pop, Lock & Drop It".

== Early life ==
Huey was born as Lawrence Franks Jr. on September 12, 1987, in Kinloch, Missouri, where he was raised. He moved to the Walnut Park neighborhood of St. Louis when he was five and returned to St. Louis County as a teenager. In an interview, he remembered his community as having "a lot of drugs going on and, of course, a little bit of violence" and said that his experiences growing up in a tough area inspired his rap lyrics. Franks, the youngest of four children, recalled his childhood being "really rough" and stated "My mama and daddy were on drugs. My brother was in and out of jail. The foster people were chasing me. It was crazy".

== Career ==
=== Music beginnings ===
At age 15, Huey began creating hip hop beats. His older brother referred Franks to producer Angela Richardson, who was creating a rap group. Franks began performing as Huey, and his songs "Oh" and "Pop, Lock & Drop It" became local favorites among DJs and promoters. Huey was featured on a series of mixtapes, one of which, Unsigned Hype, sold out of its run of 8,000 copies and was noticed by producer TJ Chapman, who introduced the rapper to Vice President of A&R at Jive Records, Mickey "MeMpHiTz" Wright, in 2006.

=== 2006–2007: Notebook Paper ===
Huey's debut album for the label, Notebook Paper, was released in mid-2007, described by AllMusic as sounding like a mixture of Nelly, Chingy, and Ludacris. The album reached number 26 on the Billboard 200 chart and number 10 on the Top R&B/Hip-Hop Albums chart. "Pop, Lock & Drop It", its lead single, peaked at number 6 on the Billboard Hot 100, becoming his biggest hit to date. Nelly's refusal to work with Huey on his debut album prompted two diss tracks "Down, Down, Baby" featuring Tha Camp Boyz and "Back at Cha'". Notebook Paper's next single was "When I Hustle" featuring singer Lloyd. In 2007, Huey was featured on the song "Hook it Up" on R Kelly's album Double Up.

=== 2010: Redemption ===
Huey's second album, Redemption, was released on September 14, 2010, after many delays. The first official single from the album was "Smile and Wave", which features Dorrough and was released on June 15, 2010. In "Smile and Wave", Huey criticizes his critics.

=== 2013–2020: Project H ===
In 2013 Huey announced that he had officially signed with Waka Flocka Flame's label Brick Squad Monopoly and was working on his third album. On May 14, 2014, Huey released his mixtape entitled Project H. However, not much materialized from his signing to Brick Squad and Huey had been relatively quiet on the music scene in recent years. According to music executive William "Quayshaun" Carter, who worked with Huey in the 2010s, prior to his death, Huey had just started a business in upscale clothing, "and it was working out, and he was happy".

== Death ==
On June 25, 2020, Franks and an unidentified 21-year old male companion were shot in front of Franks' home in Kinloch, Missouri. Both men were hospitalized, but the following day Franks died from his wounds at age 32.

== Discography ==
=== Albums ===
List of albums, with selected chart positions
Title	Album details	Peak chart positions		
Title	Album details	US	US R&B /HH	US Rap
Notebook Paper	Released: June 19, 2007; Label: Hitz Committee, Jive; Format: CD, digital download	26	10	4
Redemption	Released: September 14, 2010; Label: EMI; Format: CD, digital download	—	—	—

=== Mixtapes ===
Huey's mixtapes and details
Title	Mixtape details
Who the F*ck Is Huey?	Released: January 5, 2011
Project H	Released: May 14, 2014

=== Singles ===
List of singles, with selected chart positions and certifications, showing year released and album name
Title	Year	Peak chart positions				Certifications	Album
Title	Year	US	US R&B /HH	US Rap	NZ	Certifications	Album
"Pop, Lock & Drop It"	2006	6	6	2	10	RIAA: 2× Platinum	Notebook Paper
"When I Hustle" (featuring Lloyd)	2007	—	80	—	—		Notebook Paper
"Tell Me This (G-5) [Tha Remix]" (featuring MeMpHiTz and T-Pain)	2008	—	—	—	—		Notebook Paper
"24/7 - 365" (featuring Maino and Glasses Malone)	2008	—	—	—	—		Non-album singles
"Payow!" (featuring Juelz Santana and Bobby V)	2009	—	88	—	—		Non-album singles
"Smile & Wave" (featuring Dorrough)	2010	—	—	—	—		Redemption
"Pulled Away"	2020	—	—	—	—		Non-album single
"—" denotes a recording that did not chart or was not released in that territory.

== See also ==
- List of murdered hip hop musicians
