= New Zealand top 50 singles of 2005 =

This is a list of the top 50 singles of 2005 in New Zealand.

== Chart ==
Key
† – Song of New Zealand origin (Note: Whether or not a song is of New Zealand origin is determined by the RIANZ)

Rank	Artist	Single
1	Crazy Frog	"Axel F" from the album, Crazy Frog Presents Crazy Hits
2	Schnappi	"Das Kleine Krokodil" from the album, Schnappi und Seine Freunde
3	Savage featuring Akon	"Moonshine"† from the album, Moonshine
4	Crazy Frog	"Popcorn" from the album, Crazy Frog Presents Crazy Hits
5	Pussycat Dolls featuring Busta Rhymes	"Don't Cha" from the album, PCD
6	Mario	"Let Me Love You" from the album, Turning Point
7	The Black Eyed Peas	"Don't Phunk With My Heart" from the album, Monkey Business
8	Will Smith	"Switch" from the album, Lost & Found
9	Savage	"Swing"† from the album, Moonshine
10	Crazy Frog	"Jingle Bells" from the album, Crazy Frog Presents Crazy Hits (Crazy Christmas Edition)
11	2Pac featuring Elton John	"Ghetto Gospel" from the album, Loyal To The Game
12	50 Cent featuring Olivia	"Candy Shop" from the album, The Massacre
13	Jesse McCartney	"Beautiful Soul" from the album, Beautiful Soul
14	Rihanna	"Pon De Replay" from the album, Music Of The Sun
15	Akon	"Lonely" from the album, Trouble
16	Mattafix	"Big City Life" from the album, Signs Of A Struggle
17	Ciara featuring Missy Elliott	"1, 2, Step" from the album, Goodies
18	Gorillaz featuring De La Soul	"Feel Good Inc" from the album, Demon Days
19	Gwen Stefani	"Hollaback Girl" from the album, Love, Angel, Music, Baby
20	Kanye West featuring Jamie Foxx	"Gold Digger" from the album, Late Registration
21	The Game featuring 50 Cent	"Hate It or Love It" from the album, The Documentary
22	Snoop Dogg featuring Pharrell Williams	"Drop It Like It's Hot" from the album, R&G (Rhythm & Gangsta): The Masterpiece
23	Missy Elliott featuring Ciara & Fatman Scoop	"Lose Control" from the album, The Cookbook
24	Snoop Dogg featuring Charlie Wilson & Justin Timberlake	"Signs" from the album, R&G (Rhythm & Gangsta): The Masterpiece
25	Rosita Vai	"All I Ask"† from the album, Golden
26	The Game featuring 50 Cent	"How We Do" from the album, The Documentary
27	James Blunt	"You're Beautiful" from the album, Back To Bedlam
28	Jennifer Lopez	"Get Right" from the album, Rebirth
29	Nelly featuring Tim McGraw	"Over & Over" from the album, Suit
30	Gwen Stefani featuring Eve	"Rich Girl" from the album, Love, Angel, Music, Baby
31	Sugababes	"Push The Button" from the album, Taller In More Ways
32	BodyRockers	"I Like The Way (You Move)" from the album, BodyRockers
33	Gorillaz	"Dare" from the album, Demon Days
34	Eminem	"Like Toy Soldiers" from the album, Encore
35	Destiny's Child featuring T.I. & Lil Wayne	"Soldier" from the album, Destiny Fulfilled
36	Mariah Carey	"We Belong Together" from the album, The Emancipation Of Mimi
37	Greenpeace	"Anchor Me"† from the single of the same name
38	The Black Eyed Peas	"My Humps" from the album, Monkey Business
39	Madonna	"Hung Up" from the album, Confessions On A Dance Floor
40	The Black Eyed Peas	"Don't Lie" from the album, Monkey Business
41	JoJo featuring Bow Wow	"Baby It's You" from the album, JoJo
42	Dei Hamo	"To Tha Floor"† from the album, First Edition
43	Ciara featuring Ludacris	"Oh" from the album, Goodies
44	50 Cent	"Just A Lil Bit" from the album, The Massacre
45	Pretty Ricky	"Grind With Me" from the album, Bluestars
46	Frankie J featuring Baby Bash	"Obsession" from the album, The One
47	The Veronicas	"4ever" from the album, The Secret Life Of...
48	Savage featuring Aaradhna	"They Don't Know"† from the album, Moonshine
49	Destiny's Child	"Girl" from the album, Destiny Fulfilled
50	Blindspott	"Yours Truly"† from the album, End The Silence
