= 2014 in New Zealand music =

This is a summary of the year 2014 in New Zealand music.

== Events ==
=== January ===
- Joel Fletcher's remix of Savage's song "Swing" is certified platinum in Australia where it reached number two on the national singles chart.
- Lorde wins two Grammy Awards for her hit "Royals" for "Song of the Year" and "Best Pop Solo Performance".

=== February ===
- Lorde is named "Best International Female Solo Artist" at the 2014 BRIT Awards.

=== August ===
- Kimbra released her second studio album "The Golden Echo".
