= Dalailama =

Dalailama, Dalai Lama, or Delay Lama may refer to:

- The Dalai Lama, a position in Tibetan Buddhism
  - The 14th Dalai Lama, the current holder of that position
  - Delay Lama, a Virtual Studio Technology plugin
- Dalailama (moth), a genus of moths
