= Jing! Jingeling! Der Weihnachtsschnappi! =

Single by Schnappi

from the album Schnappi's Winterfest
- Released: November 25, 2005
- Recorded: 2005
- Genre: Pop
- Length: 2:10
- Label: Universal
- Songwriters: Rosita Blissenbach; John D. Marks
- Producer: Iris Gruttmann

Schnappi singles chronology
"Ein Lama in Yokohama" (2005)	"Jing! Jingeling! Der Weihnachtsschnappi!" (2005)

"Jing! Jingeling! Der Weihnachtsschnappi!" is a 2005 song released by animated German crocodile, Schnappi. It was the first single from the second album Schnappi's Winterfest and was released on November 25, 2005. It is based on the tune of "Rudolph, the Red-Nosed Reindeer".

== Song information ==
The song was written by Rosita Blissenbach and John D. Marks, produced by Iris Gruttmann, and, as the previous singles, performed by Joy Gruttmann. This Christmas song achieved a great success in Norway where it peaked at #3 for two weeks and stayed for five weeks in the top 20. It reached number 16 for two weeks in Austria and remained in the top 20 for fours weeks. It was also a top twenty hit in Germany, peaking at #17. It achieved a moderate success in Switzerland, Sweden and Belgium, staying the low positions. It was the last Schnappi's hit in Europe.

== Track listings ==
CD single

1. "Jing! Jingeling! Der Weihnachtsschnappi!" (single version) — 2:10
2. "Schlittenfahrt" (single version) — 3:31

CD maxi

1. "Jing! Jingeling! Der Weihnachtsschnappi!" (single version) — 2:15
2. "Schlittenfahrt" (single version) — 4:45
3. "Jing! Jingeling! Der Weihnachtsschnappi!" (DJ Schnappi mix) — 3:17
4. "Schlittenfahrt" (karaoke version) — 4:45
5. "Jing! Jingeling! Der Weihnachtsschnappi!" (karaoke version) — 2:15

== Charts ==
Chart (2005)	Peak position
Austrian Singles Chart	16
Belgian Singles Chart	42
German Singles Chart	17
Norwegian Singles Chart	3
Swedish Singles Chart	29
Swiss Singles Chart	41
