= Delay Lama =

Software synthesizer

- Developer: Audionerdz
- Release: 2002
- Stable release: 1.1 / June 6, 2002; 24 years ago
- Operating system: macOS, Microsoft Windows
- Type: Software synthesizer
- License: Freeware
- Website: http://www.audionerdz.nl/index2.htm

Delay Lama is a software synthesizer available as a Virtual Studio Technology plugin.

== Origin ==
Delay Lama was created by three students of the Utrecht School of the Arts named Aram Verwoest, Steven Kruyswijk and Daan Hermans, collectively called AudioNerdz. It was a college project, meant to "make something different, useful, and fun". Frank Post was brought in to make the monk animation.

It was released in 2002 as a freeware. Only one version was released.

== Description ==
Delay Lama is a software synthesizer that emulates the human voice's frequency peak (formants) when making a vowel sound. It is available as a Virtual Studio Technology plugin. A cartesian plane (x and y axes) is used to control which vowel (ooh-ow-ah-ayh-eeh) is produced at what pitch, or a MIDI keyboard with the pitchbender (which chooses the vowel).

An animated 3D Tibetan monk mimicks singing the track. It was the first VST plugin, if not software synthesizer overall offering such a feature.

Other features include control of portamento speed, of the dry/wet signal mix and of the level of the audio delay, LFO modulation, a modulation section and a built-in equalizer. There are also many presets.

The name Delay Lama is a pun on the concept of delay and the Dalai Lama. As the name implies, the plugin offers a built-in stereo delay. Multiple types are available, including tape, analog, stereo and digital.

== Use ==
Delay Lama has become a cult-classic. It was used in successful records.

- Timmy Trumpet and Savage – Freaks
- Daiki Kasho – Baba Theme
- Jun Ishikawa – Machine Passage
- Hideyuki Fukasawa – Theme of M.O.D.O.K
- Yaga & Mackie – La batidora
- Angel & Khriz – Tu Me Pones Mal
- Gorillaz – Damascus
- NOMA – Brain Power

The 20th anniversary of the Delay Lama was celebrated in Friday Night Funkin' with the addition of the Delay Lama's design.

== Other versions ==
JonET released the Delay Lama-inspired MonkSynth.
