= Bring It Back =

Bring It Back may refer to:

- Bring It Back (Mates of State album)
- Bring It Back (McAlmont & Butler album), 2002
- Bring It Back (Illy album), 2012
- "Bring It Back" (Travis Porter song), 2011
- "Bring It Back" (8Ball & MJG song)
- "Bring It Back" (Will Sparks & Joel Fletcher song), 2013
- "Bring It Back" (Trouble, Drake and Mike Will Made It song)
- "Bring It Back", a song by Limp Bizkit from Gold Cobra
- "Bring It Back", a 2009 song by Kris Allen from Kris Allen
- "Bring It Back", a 2004 song by Lil Wayne from Tha Carter, featuring Mannie Fresh

== See also ==
- "The Battle of Evermore", a 1971 song by Led Zeppelin
