= Savage Island (album) =

Studio album by Savage
- Released: 23 December 2008
- Recorded: 2004–2008
- Genre: Hip hop
- Label: Dawn Raid Entertainment/Universal Republic

Savage chronology
Moonshine (2005)	Savage Island (2008)	Mayhem & Miracles (2012)

Singles from Savage Island (album)
- 1. "Swing" Released: 2008; 2. "Wild Out (Chooo Hooo)" Released: 2009; 3. "Hot Like Fire" Released: 2009; 4. "I Love The Islands" Released: 2009

Savage Island is the second solo album and US debut album of New Zealand rapper Savage, released in the US on 23 December 2008, and in New Zealand on 23 February 2009. The album won Savage the award for Best Pacific Urban Artist at the Pacific Music Awards in 2010.

It debuted at #12 on the US Billboard Heatseeker Albums Chart and at #53 on the US Billboard R&B chart. It soon became a success in the United States selling over 5000 copies and reaching #25 on the Billboard R&B chart. In the RIANZ Charts it debuted at #9.

== Singles ==
The first single from the album is a remix of his previous single "Swing" featuring Soulja Boy Tell 'Em which managed to sell over 1.5 million copies by the end of January 2009 and was certified platinum. The second single, "Wild Out (Chooo Hooo)" was certified Gold in New Zealand, selling over 7,500 copies. The track "Hot Like Fire" was released as the third single from the album, peaking at #26.

== Former singles ==
The album features tracks that aren't singles for the album, but were previously released as singles earlier in Savage's career. The remix of New Zealand rapper Scribe's song "Not Many" appears on this album, as well as the New Zealand and Australia top ten hit "Moonshine".

== Track listing ==
1. "Knock a Hater Out" (featuring Ganxstardd) - 4:26
2. "So Clean" - 3:00
3. "Swing" (featuring Soulja Boy Tell 'Em) - 3:37
4. "Wild Out (Chooohooo)" (featuring Angel Dust and Baby Bash) - 3:31
5. "Hot Like Fire" (featuring Rock City) - 3:57
6. "Moonshine" (featuring Akon) 3:34
7. "Not Many - The Remix" (Scribe featuring Savage & David Dallas) - 3:43
8. "S.A.V.A.G.E." - 3:23
9. "Soldier" - 3:43
10. "Bottles from the Bar" (featuring A. Leon) - 3:44
11. "Ridin' High" (featuring Sean P) - 3:23
12. "Rock & Sway" (featuring Al Phrisk and A. Leon) - 3:28
13. "I Love the Islands" (featuring Rock City) - 3:44
14. "Shorty Make It Work" - 3:54
15. "Family Tribute" - 3:59
16. "Swing (Remix)" (featuring Pitbull) - 4:42

== Chart positions and certifications ==
=== Album ===
Album Chart	Position
New Zealand RIANZ Album Chart	9
United States RIAA Rap Album Chart	25

=== Singles ===
Song title	New Zealand	Australia	United States	Certification
Hot Like Fire	26	-	-	-
Moonshine	1	9	-	2× Platinum NZ, Gold AUS
Not Many	1	19	-	Platinum NZ, Gold AUS
Swing	1	2	45	Platinum NZ, Platinum USA
Wild Out (Chooo Hooo)	6	-	-	Gold NZ

Tracks that have charted on any country's national chart are listed alfabetically. A "-" means that the song was not a charting single in that particular country.
