= Ein Lama in Yokohama =

Single by Schnappi

from the album Schnappi and Friends
- Released: 25 April 2005
- Recorded: 2005
- Genre: Pop
- Length: 2:40
- Label: Universal
- Songwriters: Rosita Blissenbach; Iris Gruttmann
- Producers: Iris Gruttmann; Hans Steingen

Schnappi singles chronology
"Schnappi, Das Kleine Krokodil" (2005)	"Ein Lama in Yokohama" (2005)	"Jing! Jingeling! Der Weihnachtsschnappi!" (2005)

"Ein Lama in Yokohama" is a 2005 song released by animated German crocodile, Schnappi. It was the second single from the debut album Schnappi und Seine Freunde and was released on 25 April 2005.

== Song subject ==
The song concerns itself with a llama (and his friend Schnappi). The llama flies to Yokohama, and is frustrated by his inability to eat with chopsticks. "Where is the fork?" asks the llama. The llama and Schnappi do various silly things with their chopsticks. Eventually, the llama learns to use chopsticks by observing several geisha eating, and becomes a chopstick "superstar".

== Song information ==
Lyrics were written and the music composed by Rosita Blissenbach and Iris Gruttmann. As for the previous single, it was performed by Joy Gruttmann. The song features Das Lama, another animated animal, which is mentioned in the credits. The music video was produced as an animated feature.

The song achieved success in many European countries, but this success was minor in comparison with "Schnappi, Das Kleine Krokodil". It hit its highest position in Germany, where it reached number 6. In Austria, it also peaked at number 6 for two weeks, after a debut at number 7 on 24 April 2005; it totalled five weeks in the top ten, 15 weeks in the top 50 and 17 weeks on the chart. The song was a hit in Norway, stayed for nine weeks in the top ten, five of them at number 7, during mid-2005.

In New Zealand, the single charted for 12 weeks in the top 40 with a peak at number 11 on 8 August 2005. In Switzerland, it debuted at number 15 on 8 May 2005, and fell off after 12 weeks. It was a moderate hit in Sweden (number 24, 13 weeks) and Australia (number 26, 7 weeks).

== Track listings ==
CD maxi

1. "Ein Lama in Yokohama"
2. "Ein Lama in Yokohama" (remix)
3. "Schnappi, Das Kleine Krokodil" (album version)

CD maxi – Germany

1. "Ein Lama in Yokohama" (mit intro) – 1:59
2. "Ein Lama in Yokohama" (Yokohama pop mix) – 3:00
3. "Ein Lama in Yokohama" (Stäbchenstar mix) – 0:35
4. "Ein Lama in Yokohama" (DJ Schnappi mix) – 5:28
5. "Schnappi (Das Kleine Krokodil)" (album version) – 2:09

CD maxi – Australia

1. "Ein Lama in Yokohama" (single video mix) – 2:01
2. "Ein Lama in Yokohama" (Yokohama pop mix) – 3:00
3. "Ein Lama in Yokohama" (Stäbchenstar mix) – 3:56
4. "Ein Lama in Yokohama" (DJ Schnappi mix) – 5:29
5. "Schnappi, Das Kleine Krokodil" (album version) – 2:11
6. "Ein Lama in Yokohama" (video)

CD single

1. "Ein Lama in Yokohama" – 1:59
2. "Ein Lama in Yokohama" (Yokohama pop mix) – 3:00

== Personnel ==
- Lyrics by Rosita Blissenbach
- Music by Iris Gruttmann
- Producer by Hans Steingen, Iris Gruttmann
- Remix by Glasperlenspielern
- Vocals by Joy Gruttmann

== Charts ==
=== Weekly charts ===
Chart (2005)	Peak position
Australian ARIA Singles Chart	26
Austrian Singles Chart	6
Eurochart Hot 100 Singles	24
German Singles Chart	6
New Zealand RIANZ Singles Chart	11
Norwegian VG-lista Singles Chart	7
Swedish Singles Chart	24
Swiss Singles Chart	15

=== Year-end charts ===
Chart (2005)	Position
Austrian Singles Chart	73
