= Like a Girl in Love =

Single by Elen Levon
- Released: 2 March 2012
- Genre: Dance-pop, electropop, house
- Length: 3:19
- Label: Ministry of Sound
- Songwriter(s): J Appleby, M Appleby

Elen Levon singles chronology
"Naughty" (2011)	"Like a Girl in Love" (2012)	"Dancing to the Same Song" (2012)

"Like a Girl in Love" is the second single from Australian recording artist Elen Levon. It was released digitally on 2 March 2012. The song peaked at number 74 on the ARIA Singles Chart, and number 14 on the ARIA Dance Chart.

== Music video ==
The accompanying music video for "Like a Girl in Love" was shot in Cambodia, and premiered online on 8 February 2012. The video depicts Levon and her male love interest going on various adventures in Cambodia, with the occasional close-up of Levon wearing a dress and an updo lip-synching the song.

== Live performances ==
Levon performed "Like a Girl in Love" during the Naughty Nights tour, a joint tour of Australia's pubs and clubs with Marvin Priest. She later performed the song at ANZ Stadium on 25 March 2012, during a match between NRL's Canterbury-Bankstown Bulldogs and Newcastle Knights.

== Track listing ==
- Digital EP
1. Like a Girl in Love (Radio Edit) – 3:19
2. Like a Girl in Love (James Ash Extended Mix) – 5:25
3. Like a Girl in Love (Starkillers Remix) – 5:48
4. Like a Girl in Love (John Dahlbäck Remix) – 5:39

== Charts ==
Chart (2012)	Peak position
ARIA Singles Chart	74
ARIA Dance Chart	14
