= Swing (Savage song) =

2005 single by Savage

Single by Savage

from the album Moonshine and Savage Island
- Released: January 2005
- Genre: Hip hop
- Length: 3:30 (original); 3:39 (remix featuring Soulja Boy); 4:42 (remix featuring Pitbull)
- Label: Dawn Raid; Universal
- Songwriters: Demetrius Chris Savelio; Aaron Fabian Ngawhika; Nathan Holmes
- Producer: Beat Kamp Muzik

Savage singles chronology
"Swing" (2005)	"Moonshine" (2005)

2008 release featuring Soulja Boy

Savage singles chronology
"Turn Me Loose" (2007)	"Swing" (remix) (2008)	"Wild Out (Chooo Hooo)" (2008)

Soulja Boy singles chronology
"Yahhh!" (2007)	"Swing" (remix) (2008)	"Donk" (2008)

"Swing" is the lead single from New Zealand hip hop artist Savage's debut solo album, Moonshine. It was released in January 2005, and reached number one on the New Zealand singles chart. In 2008, it was released in the United States with a remix featuring American rapper Soulja Boy, which reached number 45 on the Billboard Hot 100. The remix featured on Savage's second studio album and US debut, Savage Island, alongside a second remix featuring American rapper Pitbull.

In 2013, the song was remixed by Australian producer Joel Fletcher. The remix, credited as "Joel Fletcher & Savage", reached number two in Australia, and was certified quadruple platinum by the Australian Recording Industry Association.

== Original version ==
"Swing" was sent to radio in New Zealand in November 2004 and released commercially in the first week of January 2005 as Savage's debut solo single, following an album as part of the Deceptikonz and a feature on Scribe's hit single "Not Many – The Remix!". The music video was filmed by Offramp Productions in Ōtāhuhu, New Zealand in November 2004. In the single's first week of release, it debuted at number two on the New Zealand singles chart, behind Snoop Dogg's "Drop It Like It's Hot", and the following week it climbed to number one, where it remained for five weeks. It finished 2005 as the year's ninth highest selling single in New Zealand, and the second highest by a New Zealand artist, behind Savage's own follow-up single "Moonshine".

It was released in Australia on 15 August 2005, and debuted at number 44 on the ARIA Singles Chart, reaching a peak of number 36 in its second week. Prior to its United States release, "Swing" had reportedly sold over 130,000 copies in New Zealand and Australia.

== United States release ==
In 2007, "Swing" was featured in a "pivotal bar scene" in the American romantic comedy film Knocked Up, and furthermore used as the music for the opening menu on its DVD release, which led to "Swing" garnering traffic on YouTube. Savage's New Zealand label Dawn Raid Entertainment released the original album Moonshine to the iTunes Store in the United States in March 2008, and "Swing" began growing on the iTunes charts, and debuted on the Billboard Hot Digital Songs chart on the week of 3 May 2008.

Following a label bidding war, Savage signed to Universal Republic Records, and a remix of "Swing" featuring American rapper Soulja Boy was produced; it was serviced to radio, and released as a digital download, in May 2008. A video for the remix was filmed by director Kai "FlyyKai" Crawford in Beverly Hills in July 2008, and released in September 2008.

The remix entered the Billboard Hot 100 on the week of 16 August 2008, and reached a peak of number 45 on 4 October 2008, charting for 20 weeks in total. In November 2008, the song was certified platinum in the United States, and in January 2009, it was announced as having become the then-highest selling New Zealand single in US history, with over 1.5 million digital sales, including over 500,000 ringtone sales. It was eventually certified double platinum in October 2020. Additionally, the song returned to the New Zealand charts, reaching number 23 in August 2008, and Savage won an International Achievement Award at the 2008 New Zealand Music Awards, and an International Breakthrough award was created in his honour at the Pacific Music Awards in New Zealand in May 2009. The remix also featured on the 2008 US compilation Now That's What I Call Music! 29, the last edition in the series to be certified platinum.

"Swing"

Single by Joel Fletcher and Savage
- Released: 31 October 2013
- Genre: Melbourne bounce
- Length: 3:00 (radio edit); 5:15 (original mix)
- Label: Hussle Recordings

Joel Fletcher singles chronology
"Jetfuel" (2013)	"Swing" (2013)	"Loco" (2014)

Savage singles chronology
"Because of You" (2012)	"Swing" (2013)	"Freaks" (2014)

Music video
- "Swing" on YouTube

== Joel Fletcher remix ==
In 2013, "Swing" was remixed by Australian producer Joel Fletcher, following his breakthrough top 40 hit "Bring It Back" with Will Sparks. Fletcher said of the production of the remix:

"I did Swing in maybe three or four hours before a gig when I was browsing through my iTunes looking for some a cappella to play that night and I came across the Savage track. It was about a year ago. From there, Ministry of Sound heard the tracks and wanted to do something with it. When it got leaked on the internet, I was a bit iffy about when to do with it; I didn't think it would succeed because everyone could get it. They told me to trust them, to revisit the track and rework it. You never know what can happen."

The Joel Fletcher remix was released on Beatport on 31 October 2013, then as part of the Australian edition of the compilation Ministry of Sound – The Annual 2014 on 8 November 2013, then as a single on the Australian iTunes Store a week later. It debuted at number 45 on the ARIA Singles Chart on 18 November 2013, the week of the compilation's release, and climbed continuously for the next two months, reaching a peak of number two on the week of 27 January 2014, behind Pharrell Williams' "Happy". It placed at number 23 on the Australian year-end singles chart of 2014, and was ultimately certified quadruple platinum by the Australian Recording Industry Association in June 2018. It is the highest charting single of both artists in Australia, and has been credited for "[propelling] the relatively unknown sound of Melbourne bounce to a national audience". The remix's popularity also caused the original track to return to the Australian charts, re-entering at number 95 on the week of 27 January 2014, and peaking at number 83 on 17 March 2014.

A music video for the Joel Fletcher remix was filmed on 17 December 2013, and released on 14 January 2014. Savage makes an appearance in the video, where he arrives at a house party and performs the "famous lyrics".

== Track listings ==
2005 New Zealand CD single

1. "Swing" (radio edit) – 3:33
2. "Swing" (album version) – 3:32
3. "Swing" (Sol Messiah remix) – 3:39
4. "Swing" (instrumental) – 3:32

2005 Australian CD single

1. "Swing" (radio edit)
2. "Swing" (album version)
3. "Swing" (Sol Messiah remix)
4. "Swing" (instrumental)
5. "Swing" (Bump City remix)
6. "Swing" (Crooked Eye remix)
7. "Swing" (Nate D remix)

2008 digital download – featuring Soulja Boy

1. "Swing" (featuring Soulja Boy) – 3:40

2008 digital download – featuring Pitbull

1. "Swing" (featuring Pitbull) – 4:42

2013 digital download – Joel Fletcher remix

1. "Swing" (original mix) (Joel Fletcher & Savage) – 5:15

2013 digital download – Joel Fletcher remix

1. "Swing" (radio edit) (Joel Fletcher & Savage) – 3:00

2014 digital download – remixes

1. "Swing" (Dylan Sanders remix) (Joel Fletcher & Savage) – 5:07
2. "Swing" (The Only remix) (Joel Fletcher & Savage) – 3:39

== Charts ==
=== Weekly charts ===
==== Original version ====
Chart (2005)	Peak position
Australia (ARIA)	36
Australia Club Tracks (ARIA)	3
Australian Urban (ARIA)	17
New Zealand (Recorded Music NZ)	1

Chart (2014)	Peak position
Australia (ARIA)	83

==== Remix featuring Soulja Boy ====
Chart (2008)	Peak position
New Zealand (Recorded Music NZ)	23
US Billboard Hot 100	45
US Hot Rap Songs (Billboard)	20
US Pop Airplay (Billboard)	31
US Rhythmic Airplay (Billboard)	13

==== Joel Fletcher remix ====
Chart (2013–2014)	Peak position
Australia (ARIA)	2
Australia Club Tracks (ARIA)	6
New Zealand Artists Singles (Recorded Music NZ)	8

=== Year-end charts ===
==== Original version ====
Chart (2005)	Position
Australia Club Tracks (ARIA)	22
New Zealand (RIANZ)	9

==== Joel Fletcher remix ====
Chart (2014)	Position
Australia (ARIA)	23
Australia Club Tracks (ARIA)	32

== Certifications ==
=== Original version ===
Region	Certification	Certified units/sales
Australia (ARIA)	2× Platinum	140,000^{^}
New Zealand (RMNZ)	2× Platinum	60,000^{‡}
^{^} Shipments figures based on certification alone.^{‡} Sales+streaming figures based on certification alone.

=== Remix featuring Soulja Boy ===
Region	Certification	Certified units/sales
United States (RIAA)	2× Platinum	2,000,000^{‡}
^{‡} Sales+streaming figures based on certification alone.

=== Joel Fletcher remix ===
Region	Certification	Certified units/sales
Australia (ARIA)	4× Platinum	280,000^{‡}
^{‡} Sales+streaming figures based on certification alone.

== Release history ==
Region	Version	Date	Format	Label	Ref.
New Zealand	Original	November 2004	Radio airplay	Dawn Raid Entertainment; Universal	
New Zealand	Original	January 2005	CD single	Dawn Raid Entertainment; Universal	
Australia	Original	15 August 2005	CD single	Dawn Raid Entertainment; Warner	
United States	Remix featuring Soulja Boy	27 May 2008	Digital download	Universal Republic	
United States	Remix featuring Soulja Boy	25 August 2008	Contemporary hit radio	Universal Republic	
United States	Remix featuring Pitbull	18 November 2008	Digital download	Dawn Raid Entertainment; Universal	
Worldwide	Joel Fletcher remix (original mix)	31 October 2013	Digital download	Hussle Recordings	
Australia	Joel Fletcher remix (radio edit)	15 November 2013	Digital download	Hussle Recordings	

== In popular culture ==
In 2020, the song gained new popularity when it was widely used on the social media app TikTok. The songs chorus lyrics, "Oh shit, shake that ass ma, move it like a Gypsy. Stop, woah, back it up now let me see your hips swing!" was the music used in numerous videos showing Donald Trump dancing at a campaign rally. The songs popularity on TikTok caused it to rise in sales charts.

== See also ==
- List of number-one singles from the 2000s (New Zealand)
- List of number-one dance singles of 2014 (Australia)
