= Duguneh =

- Birth name: Duguneh Juwara
- Origin: The Netherlands
- Genres: Dance pop; EDM
- Occupations: DJ; music producer
- Years active: 2010–present.
- Labels: PM Recordings
- Website: djduguneh.com

Duguneh Juwara, better known by his stage name Duguneh, is a Dutch-Gambian DJ and music producer.

Inspired by his African roots, Duguneh established a music style in which he blends African sounds into electronic dance music.

== Musical career ==
In July 2018, he released the single “Sufre” together with the Venezuelan singer-songwriter Emy Perez (former backing vocalist of Shakira). It premiered nationally on the Dutch SLAM! (radio station). Sufre entered the Spotify Viral 50 Charts of The Netherlands at #23 and peaked at #10. In November 2018, Sufre was used by The Voice of Holland, a Dutch reality television competition that Emy Perez was part of in 2013.

In August 2019, the single “Milky Way” was released. A collaboration with singer-songwriter Abi F Jones (UK) and rapper Jay Fonseca (NL). On his social media channels, Duguneh described the song as an experiment to unite African, Western and Latin music in one song.

Later that year, Duguneh collaborated with multi-platinum rapper Savage (rapper) from New Zealand. Their single “Fire” released in May 2020.

In June 2020, the single “Take Back Your Life” with the Congolese-Swedish singer-songwriter Mohombi (who is better known for his single Bumpy Ride) was released. In an interview with Dagblad van het Noorden, Duguneh said: “We made this song to remind people to embrace the good in life and celebrate it. It's that happy, positive song that gives people something to smile – and dance – about.”. The song was tipped by the Dutch Top 40 on the 3rd of July 2020.

About a year later, March 2021, Duguneh released an official cover of I Can See Clearly Now (originally written by Johnny Nash). The song was a collaboration with German producer Crystal Rock and Canadian singer-songwriter Mike Ruby, and was granted permission by Nash's publisher and relatives.

=== Discography ===
Title	Year	Featuring
Sufre	2018	Emy Perez
Milky Way	2019	Abi F Jones, Jay Fonseca
Milky Way (remix)	2020	Abi F Jones, Jay Fonseca
Fire	2020	Savage (rapper)
Take Back Your Life	2020	Mohombi, Sha
Take Back Your Life (remix)	2020	Mohombi, Sha
I Can See Clearly Now	2021	Crystal Rock, Mike Ruby

== Charity ==
Next to music, Duguneh tries to create awareness among his fans regarding climate change and the wellbeing of the planet. In June 2020, he launched a clothing line from which the profits are donated to Justdiggit, a Dutch non-profit organization who are working on contour trenching in Africa. An agricultural technique to make dry land green again
