= Schnappi's Winterfest =

Studio album by Schnappi
- Released: 2 December 2005
- Recorded: ???
- Genre: Pop
- Label: Polydor

Schnappi chronology
Schnappi und Seine Freunde (2005)	Schnappi's Winterfest (2005)

Schnappi's Winterfest is the second and final album from animated German crocodile, Schnappi. It was released in 2005.

== Track listing ==
1. "Jing! Jingeling! Der Weihnachtsschnappi!"
2. "Wichtelweihnacht"
3. "Weihnachtsgrüße von Schnappi"
4. "Im Weihnachtswald"
5. "Tante Billas Weihnachtsvilla"
6. "Weihnachtsfest mit Hase Moppel"
7. "Flaschenpost"
8. "In der Haifischbar"
9. "Flockenflug"
10. "Schokoweihnachtsmann"
11. "Schlittenfahrt"
12. "Sternschnapper"
13. "Christkind"

== Charts ==
Chart	Peak position
Austrian Albums Chart	25
German Albums Chart	43
