= Naughty (Elen Levon song) =

Single by Elen Levon featuring Israel Cruz
- Released: 30 September 2011
- Recorded: April 2011
- Genre: Dance-pop
- Length: 3:21
- Label: Ministry of Sound
- Songwriters: D Cruz, A Tahta
- Producer: Israel Cruz

Elen Levon singles chronology
"Naughty" (2011)	"Like a Girl in Love" (2012)

Israel Cruz singles chronology
"Party Up" (2011)	"Naughty" (2011)	"Like a Girl in Love" (2012)

"Naughty" is the debut single by Australian recording artist Elen Levon, featuring Israel Cruz. It was released digitally on 30 September 2011. The song peaked at number 60 on the ARIA Singles Chart, and number 17 on the ARIA Dance Chart.

== Release and promotion ==
"Naughty" was sent to Australian contemporary hit radio on 5 September 2011. Two weeks later, it became the seventh most added song to radio. "Naughty" was released digitally on 30 September 2011. It debuted and peaked at number 60 on the ARIA Singles Chart on 10 October 2011. That same week, "Naughty" peaked at number 17 on the ARIA Dance Chart.

Levon performed the song at Erin McNaught's Naughty for Zu shoe collection launch party in Sydney on 5 October 2011. Throughout January 2012, "Naughty" was used in television commercials for the American television series Gossip Girl on Fox8. Levon later performed the song during her Naughty Nights tour with Marvin Priest in February 2012.

== Music video ==
The accompanying music video for "Naughty" premiered online on 28 August 2011. The video features Levon and her backup dancers performing choreographed routines in front of a backdrop of light bulbs. She is also seen singing the song while lying on the floor with her dancers surrounding her, as well as in a chair in front of speakers.

== Track listing ==
- Digital download
1. "Naughty" (Radio Edit) – 3:21
2. "Naughty" (Vandalism V8 Club Mix) – 6:33
3. "Naughty" (Rob Pix Remix) – 5:30

== Charts ==
Chart (2011)	Peak position
ARIA Singles Chart	60
ARIA Dance Chart	17
