= Let's Trot! =

Single by Brothers & Joel Fletcher
- Released: 17 March 2022
- Length: 3:08
- Label: ADA, Warner Music Australia
- Composers: Issam Ahmad, Bassam Ahmad, Joel Fletcher Allan

Joel Fletcher singles chronology
"The Bender" (2021)	"Let's Trot!" (2022)	"Flutech" (2022)

Music video
- "Let's Trot!" on YouTube

"Let's Trot!" is a song recorded by Australian drill duo Brothers and producer Joel Fletcher. The song was released in March 2022 and peaked at number 26 on the ARIA Charts.

At the APRA Music Awards of 2023, the song won Most Performed Hip Hop / Rap Work.

== Charts ==
=== Weekly charts ===
Chart performance for "Let's Trot!"
Chart (2022)	Peak position
Australia (ARIA)	26

=== Year-end chart ===
Year-end chart performance for "Let's Trot!"
Chart (2022)	Rank
Australian Artist (ARIA) Singles	39

== Certifications ==
Certifications for "Let's Trot!"
Region	Certification	Certified units/sales
Australia (ARIA)	Platinum	70,000^{‡}
^{‡} Sales+streaming figures based on certification alone.
