= Mayhem & Miracles =

Studio album by Savage
- Released: 29 June 2012
- Genre: Hip hop
- Labels: Dawn Raid; Frequency

Savage chronology
Savage Island (2009)	Mayhem & Miracles (2012)

Singles from Miracles & Mayhem
- 1. "Twerk" Released: 4 May 2012

Mayhem & Miracles is the third studio album by New Zealand recording artist Savage.

== Background and recording ==
Mayhem & Miracles was recorded and mixed at The Vault in Hollywood, California and is heavily influenced by Polynesian music. The cover art was designed by Elliot Francis Stewart.

== Release and promotion ==
Mayhem & Miracles was released worldwide as a digital download and compact disc by Dawn Raid Music on 29 June 2012. "Twerk" was released as a single on 4 May 2012. Savage embarked on the Mayhem & Miracles Twerk Tour around New Zealand in October 2012.

== Reception ==
Alistar Wickens of NZ Musician wrote that the album is more mature and deep than Savage's previous work, and less hook-rich. Mayhem & Miracles appeared at number twenty-five on the New Zealand Albums Chart dated 9 July 2012, and fell off the chart the next week. It was nominated for Best Urban/Hip Hop Album at the 2012 New Zealand Music Awards, but lost to Home Brew's self-titled debut album.

== Track listing ==
1. "My Time" (featuring Shaxe and L-Dubb) - 3:52
2. "All In" (featuring Baby Downn) - 3:41
3. "Twerk" - 3:21
4. "Because of You" (featuring SpawnBreezie) - 3:41
5. "Get Paid" (featuring Monsta G and Jah Free) - 3:46
6. "Block Exchange" (featuring Monsta G, Ganxsta Ridd and Shaxe) - 3:25
7. "I'm a Polynesian" (featuring L-Dubb, Shaxe and Mareko) - 4:19
8. "Come Out (Wrath of a Menace)" (featuring Monsta G and Jah Free) - 3:59
9. "Everywhere I Go" - 3:39
10. "This Is Me" (featuring Devolo) - 3:38
11. "I Promise" (featuring Ria) - 3:15
