= They Don't Know (Savage song) =

2005 single by Savage

Single by Savage featuring Aaradhna

from the album Moonshine
- Released: 17 October 2005
- Length: 3:57
- Label: Dawn Raid Entertainment; Universal Music New Zealand
- Songwriters: Demetrius Savelio; David Puniani; Mark Sagapolutele; Ernest Franklin
- Producer: Sol Messiah

Savage singles chronology
"Moonshine" (2005)	"They Don't Know" (2005)	"Turn Me Loose" (2005)

Aaradhna singles chronology
"Getting Stronger" (2004)	"They Don't Know" (2005)	"Love Declaration" (2005)

"They Don't Know" is a song by New Zealand musicians Savage and Aaradhna, released on 17 October 2005 as the third and final single from Savage's debut solo album, Moonshine (2005). The single peaked at number three in New Zealand and number 26 in Australia. It was New Zealand's 48th-most-successful single on 2005.

== Track listings ==
New Zealand CD single

1. "They Don't Know" (radio edit)
2. "They Don't Know" (instrumental)
3. "They Don't Know" (a cappella)

Australian CD single

1. "They Don't Know" (radio edit)
2. "They Don't Know" (original version)
3. "They Don't Know" (Bass Kleph remix)
4. "They Don't Know" (a cappella)

== Charts ==
=== Weekly charts ===
Chart (2005–2006)	Peak position
Australia (ARIA)	26
New Zealand (Recorded Music NZ)	3

=== Year-end charts ===
Chart (2005)	Position
New Zealand (RIANZ)	48

== Certifications ==
Region	Certification	Certified units/sales
New Zealand (RMNZ)	6× Platinum	180,000^{‡}
^{‡} Sales+streaming figures based on certification alone.

== Release history ==
Region	Date	Format(s)	Label(s)	Ref.
New Zealand	July 2005	Radio airplay	Dawn Raid Entertainment; Universal Music New Zealand	
New Zealand	17 October 2005	CD	Dawn Raid Entertainment; Universal Music New Zealand	
Australia	10 April 2006	CD	Warner Music Australia	
