= Ah Yeah! =

2012 song by Australian producer and DJ Will Sparks

Single by Will Sparks
- Released: November 2012
- Recorded: 2012
- Genre: Melbourne bounce
- Length: 3:25
- Label: Hussle
- Songwriter: William James Sparks
- Producer: Will Sparks

Will Sparks singles chronology
| "Okay" (2012) | "Ah Yeah!" (2012) | "Chemical Energy" (2013) |

"Ah Yeah!" is a song written and performed by Australian producer and DJ Will Sparks. It was released on Hussle label in November 2012. In February 2015 it peaked in the top 60 on the French and Swedish singles charts. In April of that year Katie Cunningham of In the Mix credited "Ah Yeah!" for giving rise to a new electro house sub-genre, Melbourne bounce. The track gained exposure by Calvin Harris and A-Trak with Sparks recalling he "went from 'hardly getting gigs in Melbourne' to getting booked every weekend for shows around the world".

In November 2014, it was re-released as "Ah Yeah So What" on Hussle / Ministry of Sound and featured Wiley and Elen Levon. This version was co-written by Sparks with Wiley, Ilan Kidron and Levon. It reached No. 4 in Australia, No. 12 in Finland and top 40 in New Zealand.

== Background ==
Will Sparks had left Caulfield Grammar at the end of year 11 to pursue a career as a performing DJ. He described his music as Melbourne bounce and performed at local pubs and clubs – he started to post tracks on social media during 2012. An early single is the self-written "Ah Yeah!", which appeared in November of that year.

"Ah Yeah!" reached No. 12 on the ARIA Club Tracks component chart in February 2013. The Various Artists compilation album Urban Dance 6 (October 2013) included it as a track. By that time "Ah Yeah!" was listed at No. 3 on Beatport's chart. In February 2015 "Oh Yeah!" peaked in the top 60 on the French and Swedish singles charts. It was listed at No. 62 of In the Mix' 100 Greatest Australian Dance Tracks of All Time in April of that year. Katie Cunningham of In the Mix credited "Ah Yeah!" for giving rise to the new electro house sub-genre of Melbourne bounce.

== "Ah Yeah So What" ==
"Ah Yeah So What"

Single by Will Sparks featuring Wiley & Elen Levon
- Released: 14 November 2014
- Length: 3:15
- Label: Hussle; Ministry of Sound
- Songwriters: William James Sparks; Richard Cowie; Ilan Kidron; Elen Menaker

Will Sparks singles chronology
| "This Is What the Bounce Is" (2014) | "Ah Yeah So What" (2014) | "Sick Like That" (2015) |

Wiley singles chronology
| "Ah Yeah So What" (2014) |

Elen Levon singles chronology
| "Kingdom" (2014) | "Ah Yeah So What" (2014) | "Cool Enough" (2014) |

In 2014, Will Sparks collaborated with Wiley and Elen Levon to re-record "Ah Yeah!", which was released in November as the single "Ah Yeah So What" on Hussle / Ministry of Sound. This version was co-written by Sparks with Richard Cowie (Wiley), Ilan Kidron and Elen Menaker (Levon). It reached No. 4 in Australia, No. 12 in Finland and top 40 in New Zealand.

== Charts ==
Ah Yeah!

| Chart (2015) | Peak position |
|---|---|
| France (SNEP) | 51 |
| Sweden (Sverigetopplistan) | 51 |

Ah Yeah So What

| Chart (2014–15) | Peak position |
|---|---|
| Australia (ARIA) | 4 |
| Belgium (Ultratip Bubbling Under Wallonia) | 8 |
| France (SNEP) | 116 |
| New Zealand (Recorded Music NZ) | 34 |

=== Year-end charts ===
| Chart (2014) | Position |
|---|---|
| Australian Artist Singles (ARIA) | 21 |

== Certifications ==
| Region | Certification | Certified units/sales |
|---|---|---|
| Australia (ARIA) | Platinum | 70,000^{^} |
| Denmark (IFPI Danmark) | Gold | 45,000^{‡} |
| New Zealand (RMNZ) | Gold | 7,500^{*} |
| Sweden (GLF) | Gold | 20,000^{‡} |
^{*} Sales figures based on certification alone.^{^} Shipments figures based on certification alone.^{‡} Sales+streaming figures based on certification alone.
