= Freaks (Timmy Trumpet and Savage song) =

Single by Timmy Trumpet and Savage
- Released: 8 August 2014
- Recorded: 2013–14
- Genre: Melbourne bounce
- Length: 2:48
- Label: Ministry of Sound; Universal
- Songwriters: Ivan Gough; Jeremy Bunawan; Mathieu Valton; Demetrius Savelio; Timothy Jude Smith

Timmy Trumpet singles chronology
"Bleed" (2013)	"Freaks" (2014)	"Nightmare" (2014)

Savage singles chronology
"Swing" (2014)	"Freaks" (2014)	"Take These Shots" (2014)

Music video
- "Freaks" on YouTube

"Freaks" is a song by Australian DJ, producer and musician Timmy Trumpet and New Zealand rapper Savage released on 8 August 2014. The song topped the singles chart in New Zealand, was a top 3 hit in Australia, and charted in other countries such as France, Belgium, Hungary, Sweden, Poland and the Netherlands. It was certified platinum by the Recording Industry Association of America for sales exceeding 1,000,000 copies, nine times platinum by the Australian Recording Industry Association for sales exceeding 630,000 copies and quintuple platinum by Recorded Music NZ for sales exceeding 150,000 copies. "Freaks" has exceeded more than 1 billion streams online.

"Freaks" debuted on the ARIA Charts at number 1 in both Dance and Australian Singles, and number 10 overall. It is the highest selling single of all time on Ministry of Sound Australia and won "Highest Selling Single" at the 2015 New Zealand Music Awards. In May 2025 the song was added to APRA billion streams list.

The software synthesizer Delay Lama was used to make the hook.

== Track listing ==
Ministry of Sound (Australia)

1. "Freaks" (radio edit) – 2:48

541 / N.E.W.S. (Belgium)

1. "Freaks" (radio edit) – 2:48
2. "Freaks" (extended mix) – 4:24
3. "Freaks" (original mix without Savage) – 4:34

== Charts ==
=== Weekly charts ===
Chart (2014–2015)	Peak position
Australia (ARIA)	3
Belgium (Ultratop 50 Flanders)	12
Belgium (Ultratop 50 Wallonia)	6
France (SNEP)	11
Hungary (Dance Top 40)	36
Hungary (Single Top 40)	23
Poland Airplay (ZPAV)	18
Poland Dance (ZPAV)	2
Poland (Video Chart)	2
Netherlands (Single Top 100)	57
New Zealand (Recorded Music NZ)	1
Sweden (Sverigetopplistan)	6
Switzerland (Schweizer Hitparade)	73
US Hot Dance/Electronic Songs (Billboard)	32

=== Year-end charts ===
Chart (2014)	Position
Australia (ARIA)	9
France (SNEP)	146
New Zealand (Recorded Music NZ)	26
Chart (2015)	Position
Belgium (Ultratop Flanders)	64
Belgium (Ultratop Wallonia)	42
France (SNEP)	117
New Zealand (Recorded Music NZ)	20
Sweden (Sverigetopplistan)	43
UK Singles (OCC)	11

=== Decade-end charts ===
Chart (2010–2019)	Position
Australia (ARIA)	87
Australian Artist Singles (ARIA)	12

== Certifications ==
Region	Certification	Certified units/sales
Australia (ARIA)	9× Platinum	630,000^{‡}
Belgium (BRMA)	Gold	15,000^{*}
Brazil (Pro-Música Brasil)	Gold	30,000^{‡}
Denmark (IFPI Danmark)	Platinum	90,000^{‡}
Italy (FIMI)	Gold	25,000^{‡}
Netherlands (NVPI)	Platinum	30,000^{‡}
New Zealand (RMNZ)	6× Platinum	180,000^{‡}
Spain (Promusicae)	Gold	30,000^{‡}
Sweden (GLF)	2× Platinum	80,000^{‡}
United Kingdom (BPI)	Gold	400,000^{‡}
United States (RIAA)	Platinum	1,000,000^{‡}
^{*} Sales figures based on certification alone.^{‡} Sales+streaming figures based on certification alone.

== In popular culture ==
"Freaks" was featured in a 2014 viral video recorded by Russell Bauer (who, in 2017, became director of the New England Conservatorium of Music at the University of New England in Armidale), "When Mama Isn't Home". In the video, Bauer is seen playing the song on trombone, with his son accompanying him by slamming an oven door to the beat. The video inspired remixes and variations of the video with other songs, and was also used as the basis of a commercial by German retailer Otto.
