= Schnappi =

German children's cartoon character

Schnippi Schnappi das kleine Krokodil
- Die Sendung mit der Maus character
- Created by: Tobias Gärd
- Portrayed by: Joy Gruttmann

In-universe information
- Nickname: TorMor Baby
- Species: Nile crocodile
- Gender: Male

Schnippi Schnappi das kleine Krokodil (Snappy the Little Crocodile) is a cartoon character originating from the German children's show Die Sendung mit der Maus (The Show with the Mouse). The cartoon's introductory song, "Schnappi, das kleine Krokodil," became an Internet hit and it reached #1 on the German Singles chart in January 2005 and other European countries as well, topping the singles charts in Austria, Belgium, the Netherlands, Norway, Sweden and Switzerland.

== Background ==
Schnappi is a one-time character in a popular animated German children's TV show called Die Sendung mit der Maus (The Show With the Mouse). In the episode in which Schnappi appears, Schnappi sings a song about life in Egypt using simple language in German.

Joy Gruttmann (who sings the song) is the niece of composer Iris Gruttmann, and since 1999, she has sung children's songs for ARD's children's broadcast Die Sendung mit der Maus. In February 2001, when she was five years old, she sang her fifth song, "Schnappi, das kleine Krokodil."

== Commercial success ==
In 2004, Schnappi became popular on the internet. Radio station RauteMusik began playing Schnappi, which led to a single release of "Schnappi, das kleine Krokodil" in December 2004. The single reached number one on Germany's GfK Entertainment Chart on January 3, 2005, staying at the top for 10 weeks. The song was then released worldwide and peaked at number one in Austria, Belgium, the Netherlands, Norway, Sweden and Switzerland in early 2005. It was translated into a French version titled "Crocky le petit crocodile", a Lithuanian version called "Šnapis mažas klokodilas", and a Japanese version entitled "Togetogeshi, chiisai wani" (刺々し、小さい鰐). Belgian techno group Dynamite released a cover version that charted at number three in Belgium while the original version was still topping the chart.

In April, the song began to experience success in Australasia. It made its first chart appearance on New Zealand's Recorded Music NZ (then RIANZ) chart at number 32 on April 25. The next week, it jumped to number three before reaching number two for the first time on its third week in. Between May 9 and July 18, the single fluctuated around the top 10, eventually spending five non-consecutive weeks at number two, denied the top position by Savage's "Moonshine", The Black Eyed Peas' "Don't Phunk with My Heart", and Crazy Frog's version of "Axel F". It remained in the top 10 until September 12. On July 17, the song debuted at number 20 on Australia's ARIA Singles Chart, reaching a peak of number six on August 21.

A studio album, Schnappi und Seine Freunde was released through Polydor Records in February 2005. It peaked at number five in Finland, number two in Germany, and number one in Austria. A second single, "Ein Lama in Yokohama" (credited as "Schnappi und das Lama"), was released in April 2005 and became another top ten single in Austria, Germany and Norway. It narrowly missed the top 10 in New Zealand, reaching number 11, and peaked at number 26 in Australia. It became Schnappi's last hit in both countries. In November 2005, "Jing! Jingeling! Der Weihnachtsschnappi!" was released and peaked at number three in Norway, marking Schnappi's last hit in Europe. The second and final studio album, Schnappi's Winterfest, was released in December 2005, charting in Austria and Germany at numbers 43 and 25, respectively.

In 2005, Schnappi das kleine Krokodil – 3 Fun-Games, a PlayStation game based on Schnappi was released in Germany. It is notable for being the final game released for the system worldwide, barring homebrew titles.

== Discography ==
=== Albums ===
- Schnappi und Seine Freunde (2004)
- Schnappi's Winterfest (2005)

=== Singles ===
- "Schnappi, das kleine Krokodil" (2004)
- "Ein Lama in Yokohama" (2005)
- "Jing! Jingeling! Der Weihnachtsschnappi!" (2005)

== See also ==
- List of Internet phenomena
- Mickael Turtle
- Schnuffel
- Gummibär
- Crazy Frog
