= Panjo 5 =

- Origin: Australia
- Genres: Dance-pop
- Years active: 2008–2009
- Label: MGM
- Past members: Keiynan Lonsdale; Elen Menaker; Nancy Denis; Sarah Scott; Talia Di Giulio
- Website: http://www.panjo5.com.au/

Panjo 5 was an Australian dance and pop music quintet. The band was formed following a reality television talent show called Airtime!, which was broadcast on Nickelodeon and the Nine Network.

Their second song, "Stay Closer" received airtime on the Today Network and peaked at number 33 on the Australian Top 100 Physical Singles Chart. The release of "Stay Closer" followed the release of the band's debut song "Move" on 1 November 2008.

They officially announced their break-up on 19 November 2009 on their Facebook and Myspace page, with no third single released.

One of the members of the group later started a solo career as Elen Levon.

== Discography ==
=== Singles ===
List of singles, with selected chart positions
Title	Year	Peak chart positions
Title	Year	AUS
"Move"	2008	59
"Stay Closer"	2009	— (Note: "Stay Closer" did not enter the ARIA Singles Chart, but peaked at number 33 on the ARIA Physical Singles Chart.)
