= Dancing to the Same Song =

Single by Elen Levon

from the album Wild Child
- Released: 31 August 2012
- Genre: Dance-pop, electropop
- Length: 3:52
- Label: Ministry of Sound
- Songwriter(s): Mark Maxwell, Sean Foreman, Nathaniel Motte, Elen Levon

Elen Levon singles chronology
"Like a Girl In Love" (2012)	"Dancing to the Same Song" (2012)	"Wild Child" (2013)

"Dancing to the Same Song" is the third single from Australian recording artist Elen Levon. It was released digitally on 31 August 2012. A digital remix extended play was released on 21 September 2012. The accompanying music video premiered on YouTube on 15 October 2012. "Dancing to the Same Song" peaked at number 73 on the ARIA Singles Chart and number 14 on the ARIA Dance Singles Chart.

== Track listing ==
- Digital download
1. "Dancing to the Same Song" – 3:52
- Digital Remix EP
1. "Dancing to the Same Song" (Radio Edit) – 3:52
2. "Dancing to the Same Song" (Oskar Remix) – 6:32
3. "Dancing to the Same Song" (Jaxxon Remix) – 6:55
4. "Dancing to the Same Song" (G-Wizard & Joey Kax Remix) – 4:56

== Credits ==
- Writers- Mark Maxwell, Sean Foreman, Nathaniel Motte, Elen Levon
- Producers- Mark Maxwell, Nathaniel Motte

== Charts ==
During its week of release, "Dancing to the Same Song" was the sixth most added song to Australian radio and was the seventh most added song the following week.

Chart (2012)	Peak position
ARIA Singles Chart	73
ARIA Dance Singles Chart	14
