= Wild Child (Elen Levon song) =

Single by Elen Levon

from the album Wild Child
- Released: 19 July 2013
- Genre: Dance-pop
- Length: 3:04
- Label: Ministry of Sound
- Songwriters: Elen Menaker, Jeremy Skaller, Justin Lucas, Jamil Chammas
- Producer: Orange Factory Music

Elen Levon singles chronology
"Dancing to the Same Song" (2012)	"Wild Child" (2013)	"'Over My Head'" (2013)

"Wild Child" is the fourth single from Australian recording artist Elen Levon. It was released in mid-2013 and became her best charting single thus far. The music video was directed by Prad Senanayake and was released via the Ministry of Sounds YouTube channel on July 14, 2013 with the track's digital release following on 19 August.

== Track listing ==
Digital Single

1. Wild Child

== Reception ==
Reception for the single has been mostly positive with many liking Levon's transition from dance/club anthems to a more organic sound. David from 'Pop On And On' gave the single a positive review stating that the song "...begins with piano driven beauty before soaring into head boppin’, drum bangin’ heights on the chorus. The execution here is flawless, her vocals are on point and the production holds all the right elements without trying too hard. I'm so ready for Levon to make some waves stateside. Richard from DjBooth commented that Levon sounds somewhat like Rihanna. The single was certified gold in Italy for 15.000 copies sold.

== Charts ==
Weekly chart performance for "Wild Child"
Chart (2013–14)	Peak
Australia (ARIA)	48
Italy (FIMI)	21

Annual chart rankings for "Wild Child"
Chart (2014)	Rank
Italy (Musica e dischi)	79

== Certifications ==
Region	Certification	Certified units/sales
Italy (FIMI)	Gold	15,000^{‡}
^{‡} Sales+streaming figures based on certification alone.
