= Brothers (rappers) =

Australian music duo

- Origin: Sydney, Australia
- Years active: 2019–
- Members: Bassam Ahmad; Issam Ahmad

Brothers are an Australian rap duo consisting of Bassam and Issam Ahmad. They released their debut single in 2019. They are best known for their 2022 single "Let's Trot!". Their debut studio album All Eyez On Us is scheduled for release in September 2024.

== Discography ==
=== Albums ===
List of Albums, with selected details
Title	Details
All Eyez On Us	Scheduled: 13 September 2024; Label:

=== Charted and/or certified singles ===
Title	Year	Peak chart positions		Certifications
Title	Year	AUS	NZ Hot	Certifications
"Let's Trot!" (with Joel Fletcher)	2022	26	14	ARIA: Platinum

== Awards and nominations ==
=== APRA Awards ===
The APRA Awards are presented annually from 1982 by the Australasian Performing Right Association (APRA), "honouring composers and songwriters".

Year	Nominee / work	Award	Result	Ref.
2023	"Let's Trot!" (with Joel Fletcher)	Most Performed Hip Hop/ Rap Work of the Year	Won	
