= Narco (song) =

Single by Blasterjaxx and Timmy Trumpet
- Released: November 13, 2017
- Genre: Electronic; Melbourne bounce
- Length: 3:28
- Label: Maxximize Records
- Songwriters: Thom Jongkind; Idir Makhlaf; Timothy Jude Smith

Music video
- Blasterjaxx & Timmy Trumpet - Narco (Official Music Video) - YouTube

"Narco" is a song by Dutch DJ/production duo Blasterjaxx and Australian DJ/producer Timmy Trumpet, released as a single in 2017. The song became widely popular as the walk-out song for Edwin Díaz in Major League Baseball, as well as the at-bat music for William Contreras; moreover, it was also one of the cheer songs for the Kia Tigers in KBO League and the Cheng-Yang Chu's walk-out song of the Rakuten Monkeys in CPBL League.

== Composition and recording ==
"Narco" was written and recorded by Blasterjaxx and Timmy Trumpet. The first portions of what would become "Narco" were created by Blasterjaxx members Idir Makhlaf and Thom Jongkind, who sought to create a song that would be mainstay on the dance floor. The duo soon created a synthetic drum beat that would remain in the introduction of the finished song and wrote a melody that Jongkind likened to an "Arabian flute". The Dutch duo had been looking to collaborate with Timmy Trumpet and played samples of the song when they met during his 2017 European tour. Timmy Trumpet suggested that the duo substitute a trumpet in place of the flute, and ended up recording the trumpet part in the finished version of the song. The Blasterjaxx duo later added the song's drop as well as a verse of rapping, though the duo did not listen to the verse's lyrics prior to the song's publication. The duo decided to title the track "Narco" after the crime drama television series Narcos.

The song was released as a single in late 2017.

The melody played by Timmy Trumpet, sounds very similar to the tune of 'Zuipe', a drinking song from 1979 by Belgian folk band Katastroof. 'Zuipe' became very popular again around 2000 when Katastroof released a remix (Gek-O-man) and a jumpstyle remix in 2006. Since Belgium is next to Blasterjaxx' home country The Netherlands, chances are that the party melody might have reached their ears. However, the original composer of the song and founding member of Katastroof, Rob Stafford, has chosen not to take legal action since he feared it would cost him too much money before any result was booked. Blasterjaxx has never given any credit to Katastroof.

== Reception ==
=== Use by Edwin Díaz ===
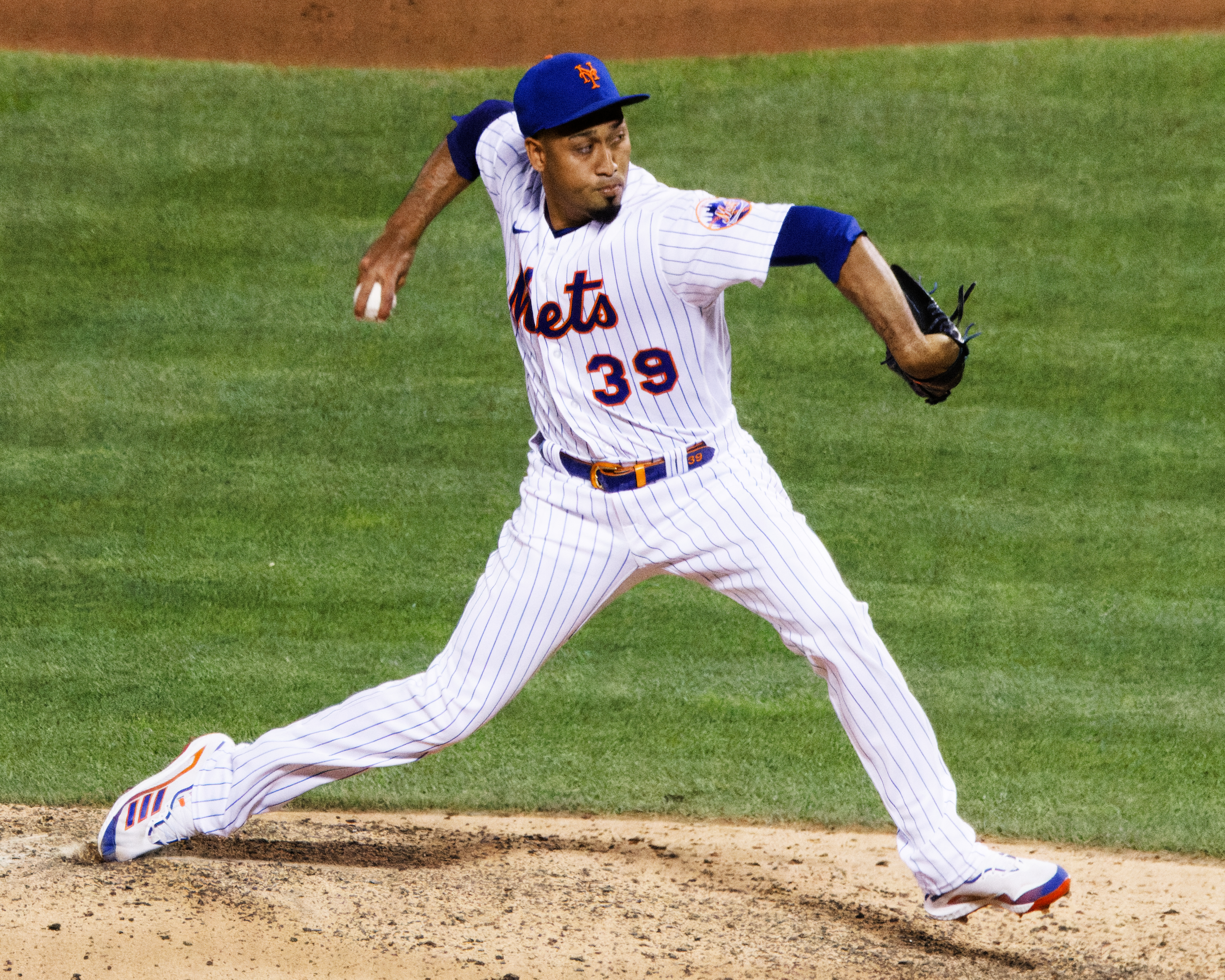
Edwin Díaz with the New York Mets in 2022

The song's popularity is associated with that of Los Angeles Dodgers pitcher Edwin Díaz. Díaz first used the song as his walk-out song during 2018, when he played for the Seattle Mariners. After he was traded to the New York Mets, he briefly changed his walkout song to "No Hay Limite" by Miky Woodz, though "Narco" retook its position as Díaz's walkout song beginning in 2020 after Díaz's poor performance throughout the latter portion of the 2019 season; the song began to increase in popularity among Mets fans throughout the 2020 MLB season. Christopher Powers of Golf Digest later described the song as having "a fire beat", while describing it as "hilarious" that "a guy known for catastrophically blowing saves had such great entrance music". During the 2021 and 2022 MLB seasons, Díaz's performance would improve, and by 2022, the song had become a favorite among fans of the Mets. Matt Monagan, writing for Major League Baseball, said that the use of "Narco" as a Díaz's entrance song is one of "the best all time" among baseball entrance music.

On August 30, 2022, Timmy Trumpet attended the Mets' game against the Los Angeles Dodgers and met Díaz. Timmy Trumpet described himself as "officially a Mets fan for life"; this was the first professional baseball game he ever attended. It was also announced that he would perform live if Díaz pitched that day. He didn't enter the game in a 4–3 Mets loss, but Timmy Trumpet promised to come back the next day to play if Díaz pitched. On August 31, Díaz entered to pitch the ninth inning to live accompaniment by Timmy Trumpet, and he earned a save in a 2–1 win over the Dodgers. Later when Díaz joined the Dodgers, his Dodger debut would see local trumpeter Tatiana Tate welcoming him with a live performance of the song on March 27, 2026.

=== Use by KIA Tigers ===
A version with lyrics was originally created by the cheering of KIA Tigers for the player Socrates Brito, starting from the 2022 season. The fan-created lyrics and dance moves of the cheering song became instantly popular in Korea to the point that even the opposite team started cheering along. In a late 2022 interview with SBS News, Timmy became positively surprised to the cheering and fan moves of the Tigers, before says his blessings and mention his love for South Korea and Baseball.

After the exit of Socrates after the 2024 season, the song got new lyrics and now is sung as a all-team song for the KIA Tigers, used at start of the team at-bats.

=== Charts ===
As of August 16, 2022, the song was No. 18 on the Billboard Hot Dance/Electronic Songs chart, its then-peak position.
