= Elen Levon =

Ukrainian-Australian singer and dancer

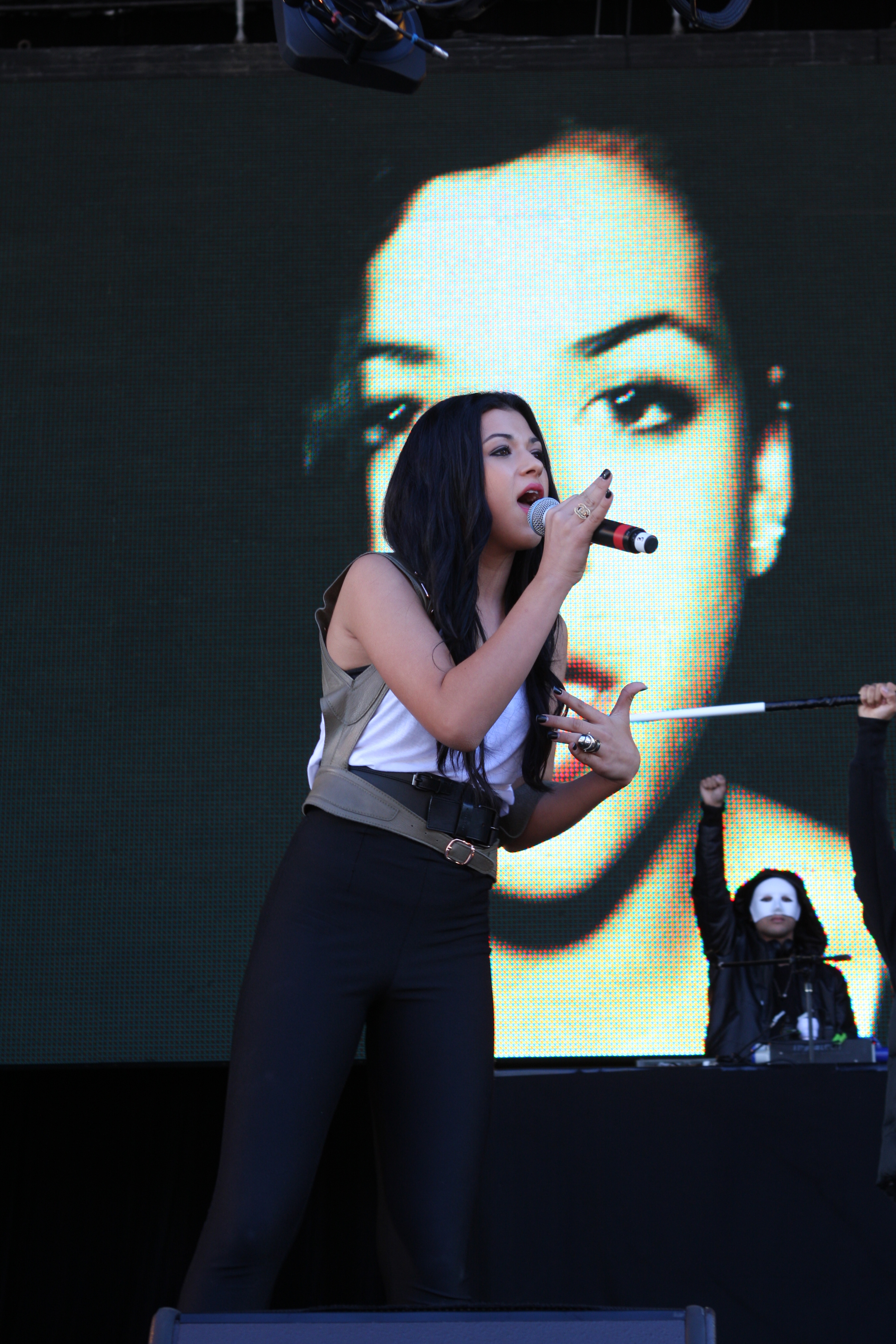
- Levon performing at Supafest 2011

Background information
- Born: 1993 or 1994 (age 32–33); Ukraine
- Origin: Sydney, New South Wales, Australia
- Genres: Pop, dance, hip hop, R&B, glam rock, art rock, indie, reggae
- Occupation: Recording artist
- Years active: 2008–2016

Elen Levon is a Ukrainian-Australian singer and dancer. Her collaboration with Will Sparks "Ah Yeah So What" reached platinum status.

== Early life ==
Levon was born in Ukraine and grew up in Sydney, Australia. She was in the group Panjo 5 as a teenager.

== Career ==
Levon released her debut single "Naughty" (Nufirm/Ministry of Sound) on September 30, 2011, which featured Australian artist and producer Israel Cruz. The single peaked at number 60 on the Australian ARIA Singles Chart.

== Discography ==
List of singles, with selected chart positions
Year	Title	Peak chart positions		Certifications	Album
Year	Title	AUS	ITA	Certifications	Album
2011	"Naughty" (featuring Israel Cruz)	60	—		Non-album singles
2012	"Like a Girl In Love"	74	—		Non-album singles
2012	"Dancing to the Same Song"	73	45		Non-album singles
2013	"Wild Child"	48	21	FIMI: Gold	Non-album singles
2013	"Over My Head"	—	29		Non-album singles
2014	"Kingdom"	—	—		Non-album singles
2014	"Cool Enough" (Spada and Elen Levon)	—	34	FIMI: Gold	Non-album singles
2016	"Don't You Worry" (Spada and Elen Levon)	—	—		Non-album singles

=== Featured singles ===
List of singles, with selected chart positions
Year	Title	Peak chart positions				Certifications	Album
Year	Title	AUS	FIN	FRA	NZ	Certifications	Album
2012	"Save My Life" (Israel Cruz featuring Elen Levon)	—	—	—	—		Non-album single
2014	"Ah Yeah So What" (Will Sparks featuring Wiley and Elen Levon)	4	12	116	34	ARIA: Platinum	Another Land

== Awards and nominations ==
=== APRA Awards ===
The APRA Awards are presented annually from 1982 by the Australasian Performing Right Association (APRA), "honouring composers and songwriters". They commenced in 1982.

Year	Nominee / work	Award	Result	Ref.
2013	"Like a Girl in Love" (Jamie Appleby, Melinda Appleby)	Dance Work of the Year	Nominated	
