= Schnappi, das kleine Krokodil =

2004 single by Schnappi

"Das kleine Krokodil"

Single by Schnappi

from the album Schnappi und Seine Freunde
- Language: German
- English title: "The Little Crocodile"
- Written: 1999
- Released: 6 December 2004
- Genre: Children's music
- Length: 2:09
- Label: Polydor; Universal
- Songwriters: Rosita Blissenbach; Iris Gruttmann; Jochen Wagner
- Producer: Iris Gruttmann

Schnappi singles chronology
| "Das kleine Krokodil" (2004) | "Ein Lama in Yokohama" (2005) |

Audio video
- "Das kleine Krokodil" on YouTube

"Das kleine Krokodil" (English: "The Little Crocodile"), also known under the title "Schnappi", is a song by the animated cartoon crocodile Schnappi, released as the lead single from his debut album, Schnappi und Seine Freunde. The voice of Schnappi is provided by Joy Gruttmann, a child singer. Joy's aunt, Iris Gruttmann, originally wrote the song in 1999 without the "Schni-Schna-Schnappi, Schnappi Schnappi schnapp" refrain, but when the song was uploaded to the internet, this hook was added in without the Gruttmanns' or Universal Music Group's knowledge. The song quickly became a viral hit, and it was released as a single on 6 December 2004—Joy's ninth birthday.

"Schnappi" subsequently became a success in continental Europe, topping the singles charts of Austria, Flanders, Germany, the Netherlands, Norway, Sweden, and Switzerland; it ended 2005 as Europe's sixth-best-selling single. It also became a top-10 hit in Australia and New Zealand, reaching number two in the latter country. In 2005, the song won an ECHO Award for Download of the Year. The song has spawned a number of cover versions in different languages that also became chart hits.

== Background ==
German child singer Joy Gruttmann provided the vocals for "Schnappi". Her aunt, Iris Gruttmann, composed the music in 1999 and rewrote the lyrics that her coworker provided. Joy, four years old at the time, was asked to sing on the track. After it was recorded, it was included on a 2001 nursery rhyme sampler titled Iris Lieder – Lied für mich, without the signature "Schni-Schna-Schnappi, Schnappi Schnappi schnapp" hook. Several years later, in 2004, the song was featured on a compilation album for the popular German children's series Die Sendung mit der Maus, sung by an animated crocodile called "Schnappi", who had never been featured on the programme before. Attention toward the song grew, and it was eventually uploaded to the internet illegally—unknown to the Gruttmanns or Universal Music Group at the time—with the aforementioned hook added in. Around this time, the song received its first airplay exposure when a radio station in Cologne, Germany, added the track to its playlists.

The Gruttmanns were on a family holiday during these events, and after returning home in August 2004, the editorial team for Die Sendung mit der Maus told them of the news. Upon checking the internet, they noticed the song being discussed on many message boards, discovered various remixes of "Schnappi" ranging from heavy metal to techno, and saw a video for Wacken Open Air in which rock fans were singing the track. Soon, the managing director of Bavaria Media, Rolf Moser, decided to handle the track's licensing and promotional agreements, and it was officially released as a single in Germany on Joy's ninth birthday, 6 December 2004. At this point, Iris hired more employees and began to work on the Schnappi und Seine Freunde album.

== Commercial performance ==
"Schnappi" reached number one on Germany's Media Control GfK singles chart on 3 January 2005, staying at the top for 10 weeks; this gave Joy Gruttmann the distinction of being the youngest singer to top the German Singles Chart. In 2005, the single was awarded an ECHO Award for Download of the Year. The song was then released worldwide and peaked at number one in Austria, Belgium, the Netherlands, Norway, Sweden, and Switzerland in early 2005. It additionally reached number two in Denmark and number 10 in France.

In April 2005, the song began to experience success in Australasia. It made its first chart appearance on New Zealand's RIANZ Singles Chart at number 32 on 25 April. The next week, it jumped to number three before reaching number two for the first time on its third week in. Between 9 May and 18 July, the single fluctuated around the top 10, eventually spending five non-consecutive weeks at number two. It remained in the top 10 until 12 September. On 17 July, the song debuted at number 20 on Australia's ARIA Singles Chart, reaching a peak of number six on 21 August.

== Cover versions ==
The song was re-recorded in Dutch by Snappie under the title "Snappie de kleine krokodil", which peaked at number two in the Netherlands and number five in the Flanders region of Belgium. Belgian techno group Dynamite released a cover version that charted at number three in Flanders while the original version was still topping the chart. In Walloon Belgium, the song was covered in French by Charlotte under the title "Schnappi, le petit crocodile", and peaked at number 23.

== Track listings ==
German maxi-CD single

1. "Das kleine Krokodil" (original mix) – 2:09
2. "Das kleine Krokodil" (Kroko Italo mix) – 3:30
3. "Das kleine Krokodil" (Nil Party mix) – 3:30
4. "Das kleine Krokodil" (Kairo Pop mix) – 3:30
5. "Das kleine Krokodil" (Kleiner Schnapper mix) – 2:30
6. "Das kleine Krokodil" (original Schnappi Beat mix) – 2:09
7. "Das kleine Krokodil" (Santa Schnappi X-mas mix) – 2:31
8. "Das kleine Krokodil" (original Schnappi Karaoke mix) – 2:09

German 3-inch CD single

1. "Das kleine Krokodil" (original mix) – 2:09
2. "Das kleine Krokodil" (Nil Party mix) – 3:30

European CD single

1. "Das kleine Krokodil" (original Schnappi mix) – 2:09
2. "Das kleine Krokodil" (Kroko Italo mix) – 3:30

European DVD single

1. "Das kleine Krokodil" (original video)
2. "Das kleine Krokodil" (Kairo Pop video)
3. "Das kleine Krokodil" (karaoke video)

Australian CD single

1. "Das kleine Krokodil" (original mix) – 2:09
2. "Das kleine Krokodil" (Kroko Italo mix) – 3:30
3. "Das kleine Krokodil" (Nil Party mix) – 3:30
4. "Das kleine Krokodil" (Kairo Pop mix) – 3:30
5. "Das kleine Krokodil" (Kleiner Schnapper mix) – 2:30
6. "Das kleine Krokodil" (original Schnappi Beat mix) – 2:09
7. "Das kleine Krokodil" (Santa Schnappi X-mas mix) – 2:31
8. "Das kleine Krokodil" (original Schnappi Karaoke mix) – 2:09
9. "Das kleine Krokodil" (original mix video)
10. "Das kleine Krokodil" (Kairo Pop video)

== Personnel ==
- Arranged by Iris Gruttmann, Jochen Wagner
- Composed by Iris Gruttmann
- Lyrics by Iris Gruttmann, Rosita Blissenbach
- Producer by Daniel Scholz, Robert Wässer, Kay Wittgenstein
- Vocals by Joy Gruttmann

== Charts ==
=== Weekly charts ===
| Chart (2004–2005) | Peak position |
|---|---|
| Australia (ARIA) | 6 |
| Australian Dance (ARIA) | 2 |
| Austria (Ö3 Austria Top 40) | 1 |
| Belgium (Ultratop 50 Flanders) | 1 |
| Belgium (Ultratip Bubbling Under Wallonia) | 17 |
| CIS Airplay (TopHit) Kroko Italo mix | 80 |
| Denmark (Tracklisten) | 2 |
| Europe (Eurochart Hot 100) | 3 |
| Finland (Suomen virallinen lista) | 15 |
| France (SNEP) | 10 |
| Germany (GfK) | 1 |
| Ireland (IRMA) | 21 |
| Netherlands (Dutch Top 40) | 1 |
| Netherlands (Single Top 100) | 1 |
| New Zealand (Recorded Music NZ) | 2 |
| Norway (VG-lista) | 1 |
| Scottish Singles Sales (Official Charts) | 28 |
| Sweden (Sverigetopplistan) | 1 |
| Switzerland (Schweizer Hitparade) | 1 |
| UK Singles (Official Charts) | 32 |

=== Year-end charts ===
| Chart (2005) | Position |
|---|---|
| Australia (ARIA) | 27 |
| Australian Dance (ARIA) | 3 |
| Austria (Ö3 Austria Top 40) | 1 |
| Belgium (Ultratop 50 Flanders) | 3 |
| Europe (Eurochart Hot 100) | 6 |
| France (SNEP) | 60 |
| Germany (Media Control GfK) | 1 |
| Netherlands (Dutch Top 40) | 28 |
| Netherlands (Single Top 100) | 7 |
| New Zealand (RIANZ) | 2 |
| Sweden (Hitlistan) | 7 |
| Switzerland (Schweizer Hitparade) | 1 |

=== Decade-end charts ===
| Chart (2000–2009) | Position |
|---|---|
| Austria (Ö3 Austria Top 40) | 7 |
| Germany (Media Control GfK) | 13 |

== Certifications and sales ==
| Region | Certification | Certified units/sales |
|---|---|---|
| Australia (ARIA) | Platinum | 70,000^{^} |
| Austria (IFPI Austria) | 2× Platinum | 60,000^{*} |
| France (SNEP) | Gold | 200,000^{*} |
| Germany (BVMI) | 2× Platinum | 600,000^{^} |
| New Zealand (RMNZ) | Platinum | 10,000^{*} |
| Sweden (GLF) | Gold | 10,000^{^} |
| Switzerland (IFPI Switzerland) | Platinum | 40,000^{^} |
^{*} Sales figures based on certification alone.^{^} Shipments figures based on certification alone.

== Release history ==
| Region | Date | Format(s) | Label(s) | Ref. |
|---|---|---|---|---|
| Germany | 6 December 2004 | 3-inch CD; maxi-CD | Polydor; Universal | |
| Australia | 4 July 2005 | CD | Polydor; Universal | |
