= Joy Gruttmann =

German singer (born 1995)

- Born: 6 December 1995 (age 29); Gelsenkirchen, Germany
- Occupation: Singer
- Instrument: Vocals
- Years active: 1999–present

Joy Gruttmann (born 6 December 1995) is a German child singer made famous by singing the song "Schnappi, das kleine Krokodil".

Joy has sung children's music for the ARD program Die Sendung mit der Maus since 1999. Her fifth song was "Schnappi, das kleine Krokodil," composed by her aunt Iris Gruttmann and recorded in 2001 when she was five years old. She performed as the voice of the character Schnappi, the namesake of the song. In 2004 and 2005, "Schnappi" became a No.1 hit in Germany and several other European countries such as Belgium, Netherlands, Switzerland, and Sweden. It also peaked in the Top 10 in Australia and New Zealand.
