= Will Sparks =

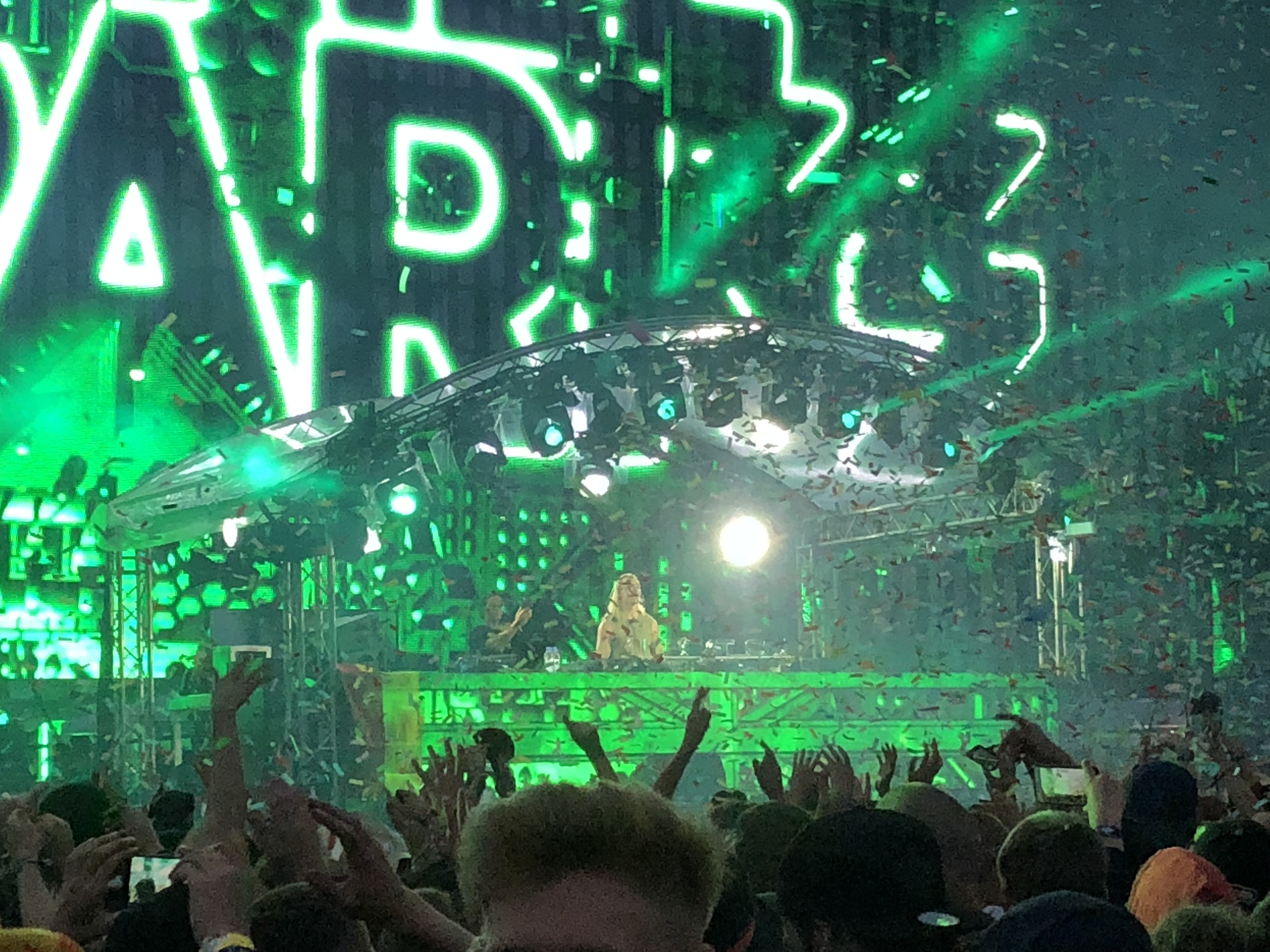
- Will Sparks playing live at the mainstage of Airbeat One Festival 2018

Background information
- Born: William James Sparks; 15 March 1993 (age 33); Melbourne, Australia
- Origin: Melbourne, Australia
- Genres: Melbourne bounce; electro house
- Occupation: Producer, musician
- Instruments: Ableton Live, guitar, piano
- Years active: 2011–present
- Labels: Sony Music Australia; Bourne Recordings; Monstercat; Spinnin' Records; Armada Music; Rave Culture; Ultra Music

William James "Will" Sparks (born 15 March 1993) is an Australian DJ and music producer from Melbourne, Australia, who is best known for his 2013 single "Bring It Back" with Joel Fletcher and his 2014 single "Ah Yeah So What!" featuring Wiley and Elen Levon.

He attended Camberwell High School and Caulfield Grammar in Melbourne, but dropped out at the end of year 11 to pursue a musical career. His debut EP, Another Land, was released in Australia and debuted at number 35 in December 2014.

Sparks has toured America, Europe and Asia and played at festivals such as TomorrowWorld, Tomorrowland, Stereosonic and Future Music Festival.

He was named the No. 1 Australian DJ in 2014.

In January 2014, Will Sparks partnered with electronic music lifestyle brand Electric Family to produce a collaboration bracelet for which 100% of the proceeds are donated to Beyond Blue, a company that is working to reduce the impact of anxiety, depression and suicide in the community by raising awareness and understanding, empowering people to seek help, and supporting recovery, management and resilience.

In May 2014, Sparks embarked on a month long European tour. He has continued to tour Europe every year until 2020.

From August until November 2014, Sparks alongside Timmy Trumpet and Joel Fletcher toured North America as part of their Bounce Bus Tour. Following the tour he returned home for a homecoming tour.

In September 2017, the video Spinnin' Records produced for Sparks' song called "Take Me" was discovered to consist almost entirely of footage from award-winning and Oscar-nominated animated short film "Requiem for Romance" Spinnin' Records did not seek permission to use visuals from the creators of the film, including animator Jonathan Ng. While Ng's takedown notice of the YouTube clips of the music video succeeded, Spinnin' Records continued to use images from Ng's video on their website and publicity material. Ng is exploring legal options against Spinnin' Records. Sparks claimed he had no knowledge of the alleged copyright, as he only produced the music for the accompanying video.

== DJ Mag Awards ==
Since 2015, Will Sparks has polled in the DJ Mag Top 100 DJ's poll.

Year	Poll Result
2015	78
2016	73
2017	83
2018	56
2019	57
2020	58
2021	56
2022	62

== Sparksmania ==
In 2018, Will Sparks launched his own festival, Sparksmania. Since the inaugural show, Sparksmania has been held in Adelaide and Brisbane featuring artists Marlo, Joel Fletcher, HP Boyz and Masked Wolf.

On 30 September 2021, Will Sparks announced Sparksmania's first national tour which included shows in Melbourne, Sydney, Brisbane and Adelaide in January and February 2022. Will Sparks was supported by Melbourne artists Short Round and Eric Sidey as well as Queensland's Yanzo.

On 3 June 2022, Sparksmania was brought to Gothenburg, Sweden for summerburst festival. The first ever international Sparksmania.

== Discography ==
=== Albums ===
List of albums, with selected chart positions
Title	Album details	Peak chart positions
Title	Album details	AUS
Another Land	Released: 5 December 2014; Label: Ultra/Sony (88875054822)	35

=== Extended plays ===
List of EPs, with selected details
Title	EP details
Nothing More, Nothing Less	Released: 9 July 2021; Label: CLUBWRK, Armada (ARMAS2032)

=== Charted singles ===
List of charted singles
Title	Year	Peak chart positions			Certifications	Label
Title	Year	AUS	FRA	NZ	Certifications	Label
"Ah Yeah!"	2012	—	51	—		Hussle Recordings
"Bring It Back" (with Joel Fletcher)	2013	33	—	—	ARIA: Platinum	Ones To Watch Records
"Catch"	2014	22	—	—		Sony Music Entertainment
"Ah Yeah So What!" (featuring Wiley and Elen Levon)	2014	4	116	34	ARIA: Platinum	Ministry of Sound Australia
"Sick Like That" (featuring Luciana)	2015	97	137	—		Ultra Records
"—" denotes an album that did not chart or was not released.

=== Remixes ===
Title	Year	Original artist(s)	Label
"Get Free"	2013	Major Lazer	Self-released
"Hello"	2013	Stafford Brothers featuring Lil Wayne and Christina Milian	Self-released
"Blurred Lines"	2013	Robin Thicke featuring T.I. and Pharrell Williams	Star Trak
"Afterturn" (with Matt Watkins)	2013	Chadio	Self-released
"Ode To Oi"	2013	TJR	Capitol Records
"Canto Della Liberta"	2013	3rd Face	Self-released
"The Darkness"	2013	Satoshi Tomiie	Self-released
"Dynamo"	2013	Laidback Luke and Hardwell	Mixmash Records
"Melbournia"	2013	Timmy Trumpet and Chardy	Hussle Recordings
"#Selfie"	2014	The Chainsmokers	Dim Mak Records
"Maps"	2014	Maroon 5	Self-released
"Uptown Funk"	2014	Mark Ronson featuring Bruno Mars	Sony Music Entertainment
"In Control"	2015	Yvng Jalapeño featuring Muki	Sony Music Entertainment
"Be Together"	2015	Major Lazer	Warner Music Australia
"Lights Out" (with Joel Fletcher)	2016	360	Self-released
"I'm in Control"	2016	AlunaGeorge featuring Popcaan	Self-released
"Mo Bounce"	2017	Iggy Azalea	Self-released
"Stand Together"	2017	Toneshifterz featuring CAYO	Big & Dirty Recordings
"Leave The Lights On"	2018	Meiko	Clubwrk / Teamwrk Records
"Back In The Game"	2018	Meiko	Clubwrk / Teamwrk Records
"Anything More"	2019	Steve Aoki featuring Era Istrefi	Liberator Music
"Song I Sing"	2020	Armin van Buuren and Haliene	Armada Music
"Little Things"	2020	Louis The Child featuring Quinn XCII and Chelsea Cutler	Interscope Records
"Devotion 2020"	2020	Bingo Players, Felguk, and Fafaq	Musical Freedom

== Awards and nominations ==
=== APRA Awards ===
The APRA Awards are presented annually from 1982 by the Australasian Performing Right Association (APRA), "honouring composers and songwriters". They commenced in 1982.

Year	Nominee / work	Award	Result	Ref.
2014	"Bring it Back" (Will Sparks & Joel Fletcher)	Dance Work of the Year	Nominated	

=== Music Victoria Awards ===
The Music Victoria Awards are an annual awards night celebrating Victorian music. They commenced in 2006.

Year	Nominee / work	Award	Result	Ref.
2014	Will Sparks	Best Electronic Act	Nominated	

== See also ==
- List of Caulfield Grammar School people
- Camberwell High School notable alumni
