= Joel Fletcher =

Australian DJ and producer (born 1992)

- Born: Joel Fletcher Allan; 30 January 1992 (age 34); Melbourne, Victoria, Australia
- Genres: Electro house, Melbourne bounce
- Occupations: Record producer, DJ
- Years active: 2010–present

Joel Fletcher Allan (born 30 January 1992) is an Australian record producer and DJ from Melbourne, who is best known for his 2013 remix of New Zealand rapper Savage's 2005 single "Swing", which charted in Australia and in New Zealand. In 2014, Fletcher was a support act for Avicii's headline tour for the Melbourne and Brisbane dates. At the APRA Music Awards of 2015, Fletcher won Dance Work of the Year for "Swing (Joel Fletcher Remix)", which was co-written by Fletcher, Demetrius Savelio (a.k.a. Savage), Nathan Holmes and Aaron Ngawhika.

In 2014, Fletcher embarked on a four-month tour of North America, called the Bounce Bus Tour, alongside Timmy Trumpet and Will Sparks.

== Discography ==
=== Charted Singles ===
Title	Year	Peak chart positions		Certifications
Title	Year	AUS	NZ Hot	Certifications
"Bring It Back" (with Will Sparks)	2013	33	—	ARIA: Platinum
"Swing" (with Savage)	2013	2	—	ARIA: 4× Platinum
"Loco" (featuring Seany B)	2014	13	—	ARIA: Gold
"The Den" (with Restricted featuring Masked Wolf)	2020	—	—	
"Flacko" (with HP Boyz)	2020	—	40	
"Changes" (with Kennyon Brown)	2021	—	— (Note: "Changes" did not enter the New Zealand Hot Singles chart, but charted at number 7 on the New Zealand Hot New Zealand Singles Chart.)	
"Let's Trot!" (with Brothers)	2022	26	14	ARIA: Platinum

== Awards and nominations ==
=== APRA Awards ===
The APRA Awards are presented annually from 1982 by the Australasian Performing Right Association (APRA), "honouring composers and songwriters".

Year	Nominee / work	Award	Result	Ref.
2014	"Bring it Back" (Will Sparks & Joel Fletcher)	Dance Work of the Year	Nominated	
2015	"Swing (Joel Fletcher Remix)"	Dance Work of the Year	Won	
2015	"Swing (Joel Fletcher Remix)"	Most Australian Played Work of the Year	Nominated	
2023	"Let's Trot!" (with Brothers)	Most Performed Hip Hop/ Rap Work of the Year	Won	
