= Timmy Trumpet =

Australian musician (born 1982)

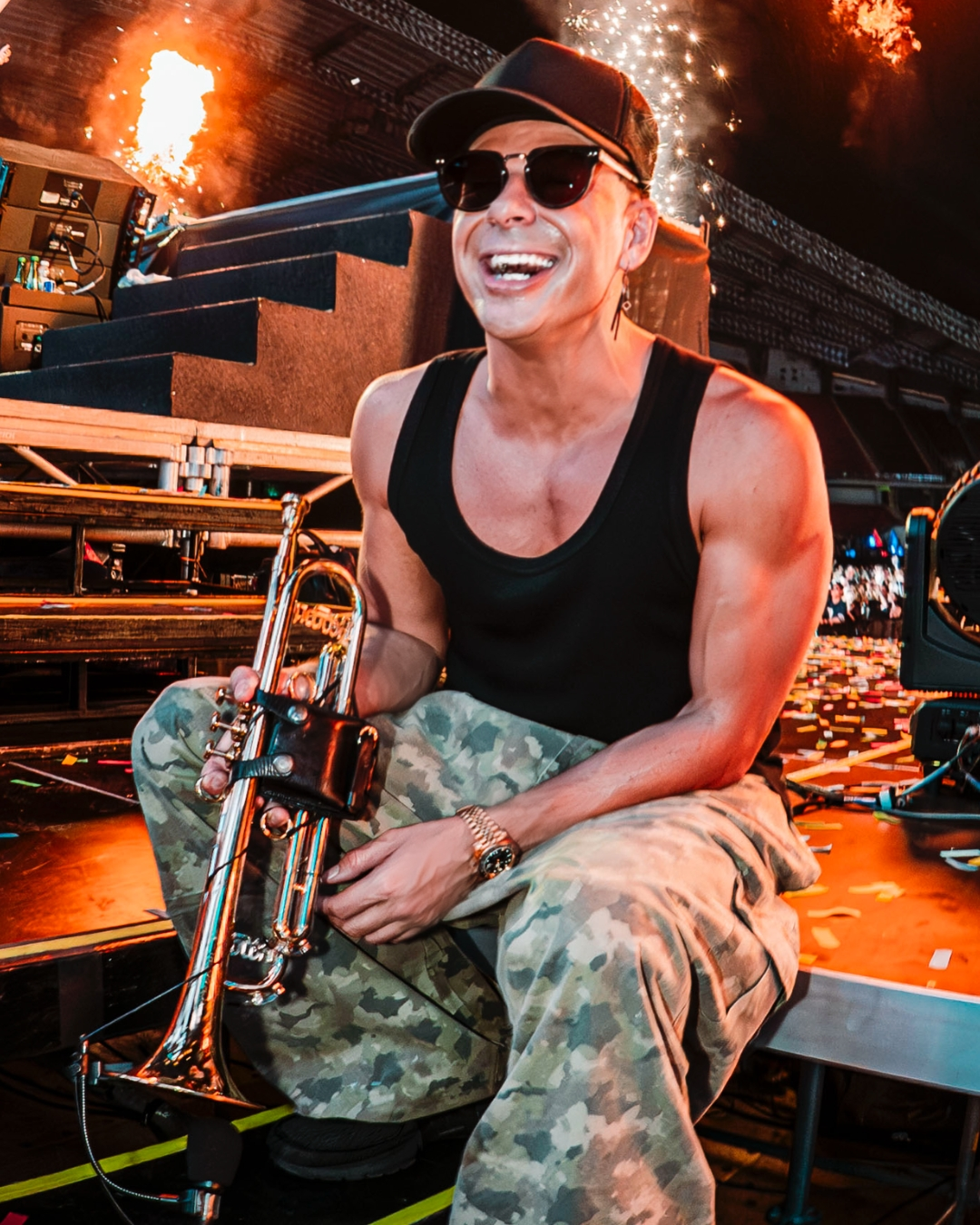
- Smith in 2025

Background information
- Born: Timothy Jude Smith; 9 June 1982 (age 44); Sydney, New South Wales, Australia
- Origin: Sydney, New South Wales, Australia
- Genres: Big room house; electro house; hardstyle; Melbourne bounce; psytrance
- Years active: 2009–present
- Labels: Armada; Central Station; Dim Mak; Dharma Worldwide; Hussle; Monstercat; OneLove; Ministry of Sound; Revealed; Sinphony; Smash The House; Spinnin'; TMRW; Ultra; Universal
- Spouse: Anett Tomcsányi (m. 2022; sep. 2026)
- Website: www.timmytrumpet.com

Timothy Jude Smith (born 9 June 1982), known by his stage name Timmy Trumpet, is an Australian musician, DJ, songwriter and record producer. He has become known internationally for playing the trumpet live and making use of jazz elements in dance music.

Timmy Trumpet's breakthrough single "Freaks" with New Zealand rapper Savage was certified gold by the RIAA, six times platinum by ARIA, and triple platinum by Recorded Music NZ. As of 2025, Timmy Trumpet is ranked number 6 in the DJ Mag "Top 100 DJs" list.

On 25 March 2019, Timmy Trumpet became the first trumpet player to perform in zero gravity, a project partnership between the European Space Agency and BigCityBeats.

== Early life ==
Timothy Jude Smith was born on 9 June 1982 in Sydney, Australia. He started playing the trumpet at 4 years old, and was taught by his father. Smith studied at Carlingford High School for his secondary education, where he was the school captain. At thirteen, Smith was named 'Young Musician of the Year' before being granted a full scholarship to the Conservatorium of Music, where he was tutored by Anthony Heinrichs of the Sydney Symphony Orchestra. Within two years he secured a position as the leading solo trumpet player in the Australian All-Star Stage Band.

== Career ==
=== 2000s–2014: Early career in Australia ===
Smith adopted the stage name Timmy Trumpet and began performing as a trumpeter alongside Australian DJ duo the Stafford Brothers at Australian nightclubs and music festivals. He taught himself how to DJ and began playing solo shows billed as Timmy Trumpet, incorporating live trumpet into his DJ sets.

In 2011, he was selected as the support act for Stevie Wonder at The Star Casino in Sydney's grand opening. Timmy also appeared as himself in a reoccurring role on The Stafford Brothers, a reality TV show originally broadcast on FOX8.

Smith completed one of his first international tours in 2014 alongside Australian DJ's Will Sparks and Joel Fletcher for their Bounce Bus Tour in North America.

Between 2012 and 2014, he had a number of singles hit number one on the ARIA Club Chart, the first being a collaboration titled 'Sassafras', with Melbourne DJ Chardy. Sassafras was the number two track on the ARIA end of year Charts – Top 50 Club Tracks of 2012. 'The Buzz', a collaboration with New World Sound reached number one on Beatport in addition to reaching number one on the ARIA Club Chart. The Buzz was also used in the Dirty Grandpa official TV trailer.

=== 2014–2016: "Freaks" and international attention ===
In 2014, Smith collaborated with New Zealand rapper Savage and released the song "Freaks" in August of the same year. The track garnered international success charting in Australia, New Zealand, Hungary, Poland, Belgium, France and the Netherlands. The single sold more than one million copies worldwide and has been streamed online over five hundred million times. "Freaks" reached number nine on the ARIA Top 100 Singles Charts , number one on the Official Aotearoa Music Charts, and number one on the ARIA Australian Singles, Dance and Club Charts, and has since been accredited three times platinum in Australia. Freaks is the highest selling single of all time on Ministry of Sound Australia. Smith was later voted the number one DJ in Australia at the 2015 InTheMix Awards.

"Freaks" features in the Hollywood TV shows and films Santa Clarita Diet, Collide, Teen Wolf, American Ultra and Training Day.

"Freaks" debuted on the Billboard emerging artists + Twitter chart at number nine when a Vine titled "When mama isn't home" went viral. The video features Brisbane father and son Russ and Toby Bauer. The father plays Freaks on a trombone whilst his son slams the oven door repeatedly. As of October 2015, the Vine received over 26 million loops, 201,800 likes and 158,200 Re-Vines. On 18 November 2015, Russ and Toby Bauer remade the viral video live on Australian national TV on Nine Network's Today where Smith surprised them, turning up halfway through the performance.

By 2015, Smith was gaining recognition within the music industry overseas and started writing and producing music with international artists. "Toca", the first of a series of international collaborations, was with Guatemalan-American DJ and producer, Carnage and Indian-American DJ and producer KSHMR. "Toca" is a Big room rework of the classical Johann Sebastian Bach composition "Toccata and Fugue in D minor". "Toca" was released on 26 June 2015 on Ultra Music. The track has since become a trademark of his live performances, using elements of the original orchestral introduction and playing live trumpet.

In 2016, he released three singles on Dutch dance label Spinnin' Records. The first release "Psy or Die" was circulated around the DJ scene without anyone knowing who had authored the unreleased track at the time, and it was played at festivals and nightclubs by Armin Van Buuren, W&W, Blasterjaxx, NERVO and Andrew Rayel. It was later revealed when released that "Psy or Die" was by Timmy Trumpet and Carnage and the track was popular on the European dance music festival scene that summer. On 27 September 2016 Spinnin Records released "Party Till We Die" by MAKJ and Timmy Trumpet featuring rock artist and motivational speaker Andrew W.K. Timmy's debut solo single released on Spinnin' titled "Oracle" reached number one on Beatport, and has received more than 150 million online streams as of October 2019.

=== 2017–2018: Global music festivals ===
In 2017, Smith made his main stage debut at Tomorrowland in Boom, Belgium. His performance was the most streamed DJ set of all time on Tomorrowland's official YouTube channel, and as of October 2019 has received twenty-two million views.

Between 2017 and 2018, he became a fixture at several dance music festivals, playing main stage sets at Parookaville, Electric Love, Creamfields, Airbeat One, and many more.

Smith collaborated with Hardwell on the track "The Underground" which was released on Revealed Recordings. He also collaborated with DJ and producers Vini Vici (formerly known as Sesto Sento) on "100" and Blasterjaxx on "Narco".

On 21 June 2018, he played a sold-out show at Ormeau Park in Belfast, Northern Ireland, selling 15,000 tickets.

=== 2019: World tour and zero gravity ===
On 25 March 2019, Smith joined a host of celebrities on the BigCityBeats World Club Dome "Zero Gravity 2.0". A specially converted A310 aircraft, usually used by the European Space Agency for training astronauts and performing scientific experiments in microgravity and other levels of reduced gravity, took off from Frankfurt Airport. The aircraft engaged in a series of parabolic flights that caused the passengers to experience a total of six minutes of true weightlessness.

On 18 April 2019, Smith announced a 60-date world tour. The single "World At Our Feet" was released on 10 May, along with an animated lyric video. The tour included main stage headlining performances at 31 festivals across Europe, North America, South America, and Asia. Timmy hosted his own stages at Tomorrowland and Creamfields. Timmy made his main stage debut at Electric Daisy Carnival in Las Vegas on 19 May, and later was announced as a headliner of Electric Daisy Carnival in Orlando, South Korea, and China.

Smith began a vlog series on YouTube chronicling his life on tour. The first episode follows his experiences at Electric Daisy Carnival in Las Vegas.

In February 2021, Smith launched a weekly radio show and YouTube stream called "SINPHONY Radio" where songs from all forms of EDM are played. During the 42nd episode of the show, he stated that the show was heard in more than 40 countries.

On 21 August 2021, Smith collaborated with Dutch DJ Armin van Buuren on a song called "Anita." The song was featured in a commercial for Cinnamon Toast Crunch a few months after its release.

In 2021 and 2022, "Narco" gained popularity in Major League Baseball when New York Mets closer Edwin Díaz adopted it as his walk-out music. On 30 August 2022, Smith attended a Mets game and met Díaz—telling him that he was "officially a Mets fan for life". During a game the following day, he performed the song's intro live at Citi Field when Díaz entered the game.

== Musical style ==
Smith is renowned for his energetic live performances and use of pyrotechnics on stage. Timmy plays mixed platform electronic music, trumpet, blending many sub-genres together, playing music at various speeds, and incorporating live trumpet solos over custom edits. His DJ sets predominantly feature his own original tracks, collaborations and remixes.

He has released music in a number of subgenres of electronic music including house, electro house, Melbourne bounce, hardstyle, psychedelic trance, big room house, and funk.

Smith has cited Daft Punk as early inspiration to start experimenting with electronic dance music. In an interview with Belfast Telegraph, he said: "I was a trumpeter before I was a DJ, I would play alongside songs I heard on the radio. I remember playing to Daft Punk for the first time. That's when I realised there might be something to this trumpet/EDM thing."

== Personal life ==
In 2020, Smith proposed to his Hungarian girlfriend Anett during a livestream. They married in Budapest in 2022. He announced their separation on Instagram in 2026.

== Discography ==
- Mad World (2020)
- REVELATIONS (2026)

== Awards and nominations ==
=== Electronic Dance Music Awards ===
The Electronic Dance Music Awards are presented by iHeart Radio and commenced in 2022.

Year	Nominee / work	Award	Result	Ref.
2022	"Sinphony Radio"	Best Radio Show	Nominated	
2022	"Ininna Tora" (with KSHMR & Mildenhaus)	Main Stage Song of the Year	Nominated	
2024	"Sinphony Radio"	Best Radio Show	Nominated	
2024	Timmy Trumpet – Amnésia, Cap d’Agde France 2023	Best Performance	Nominated	
2025	Timmy Trumpet	Club DJ of The Year	Won	
2025	Timmy Trumpet	Favourite Nightclub Residency	Won	
2025	"Sinphony Radio"	Best Radio Show	Nominated	
2025	"Like a G6" (with POLTERGST with Naeleck)	Best Collaboration	Nominated	
