= Schnappi und seine Freunde =

Schnappi und Seine Freunde

Studio album by Schnappi
- Released: 27 February 2005
- Genre: Pop
- Label: Polydor

Schnappi chronology
Schnappi und Seine Freunde (2005)	Schnappi's Winterfest (2005)

Schnappi und seine Freunde ("Schnappi and his friends") is the debut album of animated German crocodile, Schnappi and was released in 2004.

== Track listing ==
1. "Schnappi, das kleine Krokodil" (2:09)
2. "Mahlzeit" (2:25)
3. "Ein Pinguin" (2:12)
4. "Ein Lama in Yokohama" - by Schnappi und das Lama (2:02)
5. "Känguru" (4:01)
6. "Sieben Hummeln" (2:11)
7. "Ri-Ra-Rad" (2:30)
8. "Krötenkäpt'n" (2:04)
9. "Teddybärtanz" (2:48)
10. "Hase Moppel" (2:16)
11. "Das kleine Nilpferd" (1:56)
12. "Abends am Nil" (4:54)
13. "Schnappi" (Karaoke Version) (2:09)
14. "Mahlzeit" (Karaoke Version) (2:25)
15. "Ein Lama in Yokohama" - by Schnappi und das Lama (Karaoke Version) (2:02)
16. "Krötenkäpt'n" (Karaoke Version) (2:04)
17. "Das kleine Nilpferd" (Karaoke Version) (1:56)

+

1. "Schnappi" (Videos)
2. Liedtexte

== Charts ==
Chart	Peak position
Austrian Albums Chart	1
Eurochart Hot 100 Albums	94
Finnish Albums Chart	5
French Albums Chart	98
German Albums Chart	2
Swedish Albums Chart	24
Swiss Albums Chart	19
