= Moonshine (Savage album) =

Studio album by Savage
- Released: April 2005
- Genre: Hip hop
- Length: 51:03
- Label: Dawn Raid Entertainment

Savage chronology
Moonshine (2005)	Savage Island (2008)

Singles from Moonshine
- 1. "Swing" Released: January 2005; 2. "Moonshine" Released: 21 March 2005; 3. "They Don't Know" Released: 17 October 2005

Moonshine is the debut solo album by New Zealand hip hop artist Savage, released in 2005. The album includes a bonus track, "Locked Up Remix", by Senegalese singer Akon featuring Savage. In 2005, it reached number two in the New Zealand charts.

== Singles ==
The lead single "Swing" was a number-one hit in New Zealand for five consecutive weeks. Later versions of the hit would reach number two in Australia and number forty-five in the United States.

The title track was a number-one hit for seven consecutive weeks in New Zealand and reached number nine in Australia. "They Don't Know" reached number three in New Zealand and number twenty-six in Australia.

== Track listing ==
1. "Big"
2. "Bang Your Head"
3. "Anything"
4. "Swing"
5. "Moonshine" (featuring Akon)
6. "If You Love Savage"
7. "Tear the Roof Off"
8. "Everyday Hustle"
9. "They Don't Know" (featuring Aaradhna)
10. "Rock Like Me"
11. "The Bodysnatcher"
12. "Set Me Free"
13. "Locked Up Remix" (Akon featuring Savage)

== Charts ==
Chart performance for Moonshine
Chart (2005)	Peak position
Australian Albums (ARIA)	75
New Zealand Albums (RMNZ)	2
