= Bring It Back (Will Sparks and Joel Fletcher song) =

Single by Will Sparks & Joel Fletcher
- Released: 13 September 2013
- Recorded: 2013
- Genre: Melbourne bounce
- Length: 2:48 (radio edit)
- Label: Ministry of Sound Australia
- Songwriters: Joel Fletcher, Will Sparks

Will Sparks singles chronology
"The Viking" (2013)	"Bring It Back" (2013)	"Catch" (2014)

Joel Fletcher singles chronology
"Afterdark" (2013)	"Bring It Back" (2013)	"Jetfuel" (2013)

"Bring It Back" is a song written and recorded by Australian DJs and producers Will Sparks and Joel Fletcher. The song was digitally released on 13 September 2013.

== Track listing ==
- Digital download
1. "Bring It Back" (radio edit) – 2:48
2. "Bring It Back" – 5:01

== Charts ==
=== Weekly charts ===
"Bring It Back" debuted on the ARIA Singles Chart at number 44 and peaked at number 33 six weeks later.

Chart (2013)	Peak position
Australia (ARIA)	33

=== Year-end charts ===
Chart (2013)	Position
Australian Artists (ARIA)	18

== Certification ==
Region	Certification	Certified units/sales
Australia (ARIA)	Platinum	70,000^{^}
^{^} Shipments figures based on certification alone.
