= Moonshine (Savage song) =

2005 single by Savage

Single by Savage featuring Akon

from the album Moonshine and Savage Island
- Released: 21 March 2005
- Length: 3:37
- Label: Dawn Raid; Universal
- Songwriters: Aliaune Akon Thiam; Demetrius Chris Savelio
- Producer: Akon

Savage singles chronology
"Swing" (2005)	"Moonshine" (2005)	"If You Love Savage" (2005)

Akon singles chronology
"Lonely" (2005)	"Moonshine" (2005)	"Belly Dancer (Bananza)" (2005)

"Moonshine" is a song by New Zealand rapper Savage featuring Senegalese-American singer Akon, released in March 2005 as the second single from Savage's debut studio album, Moonshine (2005). It was also included on Savage's 2008 album, Savage Island. The song spent seven weeks atop of the New Zealand Singles Chart and placed third overall on New Zealand's year-end chart for 2005. In Australia, the song was released in November 2005 and reached number nine on the ARIA Singles Chart.

== Remix and music video ==
The official remix, the "West Coast Remix", features Akon, Gangsta Rkdd of Boo-Yaa T.R.I.B.E., & Monsta Ganjah of The Regime. A music video was produced to promote the single.

== Track listing ==
New Zealand and Australian CD single

1. "Moonshine" (radio edit) – 3:35
2. "Moonshine" (instrumental) – 5:02
3. "Moonshine" (a cappella) – 4:35

== Charts ==
=== Weekly charts ===
Chart (2005)	Peak position
Australia (ARIA)	9
Australian Urban (ARIA)	3
New Zealand (Recorded Music NZ)	1

=== Year-end charts ===
Chart (2005)	Position
New Zealand (RIANZ)	3

Chart (2006)	Position
Australia (ARIA)	73
Australian Urban (ARIA)	20

== Certifications ==
Region	Certification	Certified units/sales
Australia (ARIA)	Gold	35,000^{^}
New Zealand (RMNZ)	3× Platinum	90,000^{‡}
^{^} Shipments figures based on certification alone.^{‡} Sales+streaming figures based on certification alone.

== Release history ==
Region	Date	Format(s)	Label(s)	Ref.
New Zealand	21 March 2005	CD	Dawn Raid Entertainment; Universal Music New Zealand	
Australia	7 November 2005	CD	Dawn Raid Entertainment; Warner Music Australia	
