= Savage (rapper) =

New Zealand hip hop artist (born 1981)

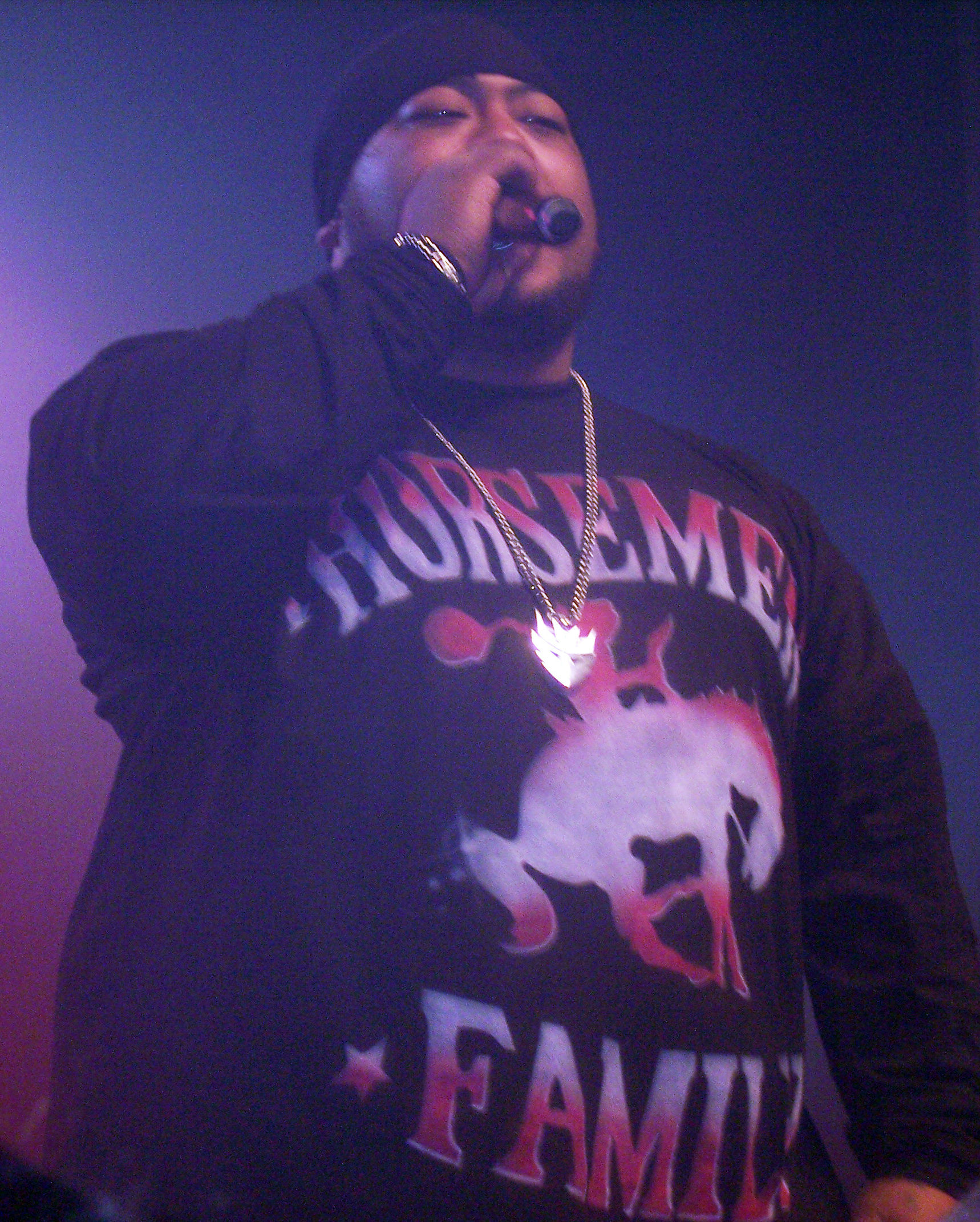
- Savage performing in 2007

Background information
- Born: Demetrius Christian Taanuu Savelio; 28 June 1981 (age 45)
- Origin: South Auckland, New Zealand
- Genre: Hip hop
- Occupations: Rapper; record producer; singer; songwriter
- Years active: 1997–present
- Labels: Ministry of Sound Australia, Dawn Raid, Universal Republic

Demetrius Christian Taanuu Savelio (born 28 June 1981), better known by his stage name Savage, is a New Zealand hip hop recording artist, record producer and member of hip hop group the Deceptikonz. Savage was the first New Zealand hip hop artist to have a commercial single achieve platinum certification status in the United States. The "International Breakthrough" accolade of the Pacific Music Awards was created in his honour. Savage also has applied his recognisable voice in the electronic dance music space with 5× platinum hit ''Freaks'' with Timmy Trumpet, and 4 times platinum hit ''Swing'' with Joel Fletcher.

== Early life and the Deceptikonz ==
Savage grew up in Samoa and South Auckland, New Zealand, raised by his mother and siblings.

Savage joined with friends to form a hip-hop group, the Deceptikonz, in 1997. Success was not instant, however, as the group struggled through several talent shows and small concerts. Their big break came in 1999 when they were signed to South Auckland (Papatoetoe) hip hop label Dawn Raid Entertainment.

In 2002, the Deceptikonz released Elimination; a studio album that peaked at number four on the New Zealand albums chart. In late 2003, Savage featured as a member of the Deceptikonz on the Mareko hit single Stop, Drop and Roll; a number six hit on the New Zealand singles chart.

== Solo career ==
=== Moonshine era (2005–2007) ===
Savage's first solo single; Swing, was released in January 2005. The hit would eventually crack the Australian singles chart in 2014 and peak at number one for five weeks in the New Zealand singles chart. Three months later, Savage released his debut solo album Moonshine which reached number two in the New Zealand album chart and included a title track as a follow-up single. This became an even bigger success than the previous single; spending seven weeks at number one on the New Zealand singles chart, and reaching the top ten in the Australian singles chart. The Moonshine single would eventually become certified twice platinum in New Zealand and gold in Australia. The third single from the album; They Don't Know reached number three in the New Zealand singles chart and was also a hit for several weeks on the Australian singles chart. In 2007, Swing featured in a club scene for the United States film Knocked Up and was also included on the movie soundtrack album.

=== Savage Island era (2008–2009) ===
Following the success of appearing in "Knocked Up", Swing was released as a single for the United States in 2008, and remix versions were made with American rappers Soulja Boy Tell 'Em and Pitbull. Upon re-release, Swing reached number forty-five on the US Billboard Hot 100, re-entered the New Zealand singles charts peaking at number twenty-three. By the end of January 2009, the song had sold over 1.5 million units in the United States alone. Because of this; Swing was certified as a platinum single in the United States.

In February 2009, Savage released Savage Island, the second studio album of his solo career. The release became his second consecutive top-ten entry on the New Zealand album chart debuting at number nine. The album included Moonshine from the previous album as well as a remix version of the New Zealand number-one hit Not Many. The release also featured two new singles Wild Out (Chooo Hooo) and Hot Like Fire. These songs became New Zealand singles chart hits with the former becoming Savage's fourth top-ten peaking song in the national chart. Savage appeared in an issue of Source Magazine to discuss the lyrical meanings behind the tracks of Savage Island the following month. In October, Savage performed the Savage Island album track I Love The Islands, to raise funds for the Samoan tsunami relief effort. In December, the video for Wild Out (Chooo Hooo) was named as one of the five most-watched YouTube music videos in New Zealand.

=== Battle of the Century era (2010–2012) ===
In 2010, Savage featured in "Battle of the Century", a nationwide tour across New Zealand alongside internationally successful New Zealand rapper Scribe. The same year, the Presents... The Tribal Council album was released. In 2012, Savage featured on the Jade Louise single "Vibrations" which was the theme song for the television series The GC.

=== Collaboration era (2013–present) ===
In 2013, "Swing" was remixed by Australian producer Joel Fletcher. The song peaked at number 2 on the ARIA Singles Chart and has been certified quadruple platinum by the Australian Recording Industry Association (ARIA) for shipments exceeding 280,000 copies. In 2014, Savage added vocals to Timmy Trumpet's song "Freaks". The song peaked at number one in New Zealand and was certified 2× Platinum by Recorded Music NZ. In Australia, it peaked at number 3 and was certified 5× Platinum by ARIA. It also reached the top five in Finland and won "Highest Selling Single" at the 2015 New Zealand Music Awards.

In 2015, Savage teamed up with Kronic and Far East Movement on "Push". The track was featured in the trailer for Fast and the Furious' eighth installment "The Fate of the Furious". This trailer was premiered during Super Bowl LI.

In 2016, Savage released "Zooby Doo" with Tigermonkey. The official video was overseen by world-famous choreographer Parris Goebel who runs the Palace Dance Studio in Savage's hometown of Auckland. The dancers, The Ladies of ReQuest, Mini ReQuest & Ezra from The Palace Dance Studio, New Zealand, were featured in Justin Bieber's mega YouTube hit "Sorry".

== Discography ==
Savage discography
- Studio albums: 3
- Compilation albums: 1
- Singles: 20
- Music videos: 16

=== Studio albums ===
Title	Album details	Peak chart positions			Certifications
Title	Album details	NZ	AUS	US Heat	Certifications
Moonshine	Released: 11 April 2005; Label: Dawn Raid; Formats: CD, digital download	2	75	—	RMNZ: Gold
Savage Island	Released: 23 December 2008; Label: Dawn Raid, Universal Republic; Formats: CD, digital download	9	—	12	
Mayhem & Miracles	Released: 29 June 2012; Label: Dawn Raid; Formats: CD, digital download	25	—	—	
"—" denotes a release that did not chart or was not released in that territory.

=== Compilation albums ===
Title	Album details
Savage Presents... The Tribal Council	Released: 5 October 2010; Label: Dawn Raid, SMC; Formats: CD, digital download

=== Singles ===
Title	Year	Peak chart positions						Certifications	Album
Title	Year	NZ	AUS	BEL (WA)	FRA	SWE	US	Certifications	Album
"Swing"	2005	1	36	—	—	—	—	RMNZ: 2× Platinum; ARIA: 2× Platinum	Moonshine
"Moonshine" (featuring Akon)	2005	1	9	—	—	—	—	RMNZ: 3× Platinum; ARIA: Gold	Moonshine
"If You Love Savage"	2005	—	—	—	—	—	—		Moonshine
"They Don't Know" (featuring Aaradhna)	2005	3	26	—	—	—	—	RMNZ: 6× Platinum	Moonshine
"Street Music" (with Mareko)	2007	—	—	—	—	—	—		—N/a
"Swing" (featuring Soulja Boy Tell'Em)	2008	23	—	—	—	—	45	RIAA: Platinum	Savage Island
"Wild Out (Chooo Hooo)" (featuring Angel Dust & Baby Bash)	2009	6	—	—	—	—	—	RMNZ: Gold	Savage Island
"Hot Like Fire" (featuring Rock City)	2009	26	—	—	—	—	—		Savage Island
"I Love The Islands" (featuring Rock City)	2009	—	—	—	—	—	—		Savage Island
"This Is Me"	2011	—	—	—	—	—	—		Mayhem & Miracles
"I Promise"	2011	—	—	—	—	—	—		Mayhem & Miracles
"Twerk"	2012	—	—	—	—	—	—		Mayhem & Miracles
"Because of You" (featuring Spawnbreezie)	2012	—	—	—	—	—	—		Mayhem & Miracles
"Swing" (with Joel Fletcher)	2013	—	2	—	—	—	—	ARIA: 4× Platinum	Non-album singles
"Freaks" (with Timmy Trumpet)	2014	1	3	— (Note: "Freaks" did not enter the Ultratop 50, but peaked at number 16 on the Walloon Ultratip chart.)	11	6	—	ARIA: 9× Platinum; RMNZ: 6× Platinum	Non-album singles
"Take These Shots" (featuring ATP & DJ Butcher)	2014	—	—	—	—	—	—		Non-album singles
"Like Michael Jackson"	2015	—	—	—	—	—	—		Non-album singles
"Not Many If Any" (with Death Ray Shake and Scribe)	2015	—	—	—	—	—	—		Non-album singles
"Push" (with Kronic and Far East Movement)	2015	—	—	—	—	—	—		Non-album singles
"Zooby Doo" (with Tigermonkey)	2016	—	—	—	—	—	—		Non-album singles
"Fire" (with Duguneh)	2020	—	—	—	—	—	—		Non-album singles
"The Bender" (with Joel Fletcher and Luciana)	2021	—	—	—	—	—	—		Non-album singles
"Whistle" (with Hooligan Hefs)	2026	—	—	—	—	—	—		"—" denotes a release that did not chart or was not released in that territory.

==== As featured artist ====
Title	Year	Peak chart positions		Album
Title	Year	NZ	AUS	Album
"Not Many – The Remix!" (Scribe featuring Savage and Con Psy)	2003	2	21	The Crusader
"Turn Me Loose" (Young Divas featuring Savage)	2007	—	15	New Attitude
"Vibrations" (Jade Louise featuring Savage)	2012	7	—	The Jade Louise EP
"Trick" (Drop Frame featuring Savage)	2014	-	-	Kinetic
"Team Ball Player Thing" (#KiwisCureBatten featuring Lorde, Kimbra, Brooke Fraser, et al.)	2015	2	—	Non-album single
"Move Back" (Crankdat featuring Savage)	2023	—	—	Slaughter House EP
"One More Chance" (Coterie featuring Savage	2024	— (Note: "One More Chance" did not enter the NZ Top 40 Singles Chart, but peaked at number 12 on the NZ Hot Singles Chart.)	—	Non-album single
"—" denotes a release that did not chart or was not released in that territory.

=== Other appearances ===
Title	Year	Artist	Album	Note
"Big Things"	2002	P-Money featuring Mareko, Patriarch, Koma, Hepaklypz, Hazaduz, Unique, Tyna, Savage, Che Fu & Scribe	Big Things	
"Freestyle"	2003	Savage	Mareko Is the Future	
"Capital SA"	2004	Alphrisk featuring Savage	The Best Kept Secret	
"Savagefeel"	2004	Tha Feelstyle	Break It to Pieces	Vocals
"Ain't Got Nothing" (New Zealand Remix)	2005	David Banner featuring Savage & Tyree	—N/a	
"The Nod"	2005	Weapon X & Ken Hell featuring Savage	Sneakerpimpin Aint Easy	
"Live It Up"	2005	King Kapisi featuring Savage	Dominant Species	
"Freestyle"	2006	Savage	Street Dreams Vol. 1	
"Move, Make Way"	2006	Savage featuring Tyree and PNC	Sione's Wedding – Music from the Motion Picture	
"Chains Reloaded"	2006	Che Fu featuring Savage	Hi-Score – The Best of Che Fu	
"The Warmth"	2006	Juse featuring Kaeson, Savage & Young Sid	Global Casino	
"Expectations" (Dawn Raid Remix)	2006	Amiel featuring Savage & Mareko	Be Your Girl	
"Straight Drop"	2008	C-Loc featuring Savage & Young Crucial	Anybody Can Get It!	
"Neva Been"	2008	C-Loc featuring Savage & Young Crucial	Anybody Can Get It!	
"You Gon Lose"	2008	C-Loc featuring Savage & Young Crucial	Anybody Can Get It!	
"Make Way"	2008	C-Loc featuring Savage	Anybody Can Get It!	
"God Chose Me"	2008	Devolo featuring Savage	Heaven & Hell	
"We Made It"	2011	Monsta featuring Savage	Pacific Coast Highway	
"Feel Inside (And Stuff Like That)"	2012	Flight of the Conchords	—N/a	Guest vocals

=== Music videos ===
Title	Year	Director
"Swing"	2005	Sophie Findlay
"Moonshine" (featuring Akon)	2005	Kai Crawford
"If You Love Savage"	2005	
"They Don't Know" (featuring Aaradhna)	2005	
"Swing" (U.S. Version)	2008	Kai Crawford
"Wild Out (Chooo Hooo)" (featuring Angel Dust & Baby Bash)	2009	Chris Graham
"Hot Like Fire" (featuring Rock City)	2009	Ivan Slavov
"I Love the Islands" (featuring Rock City)	2009	Chris Graham
"I Promise" (featuring Ria)	2011	Olivia Laita
"Come Out (Wrath of a Menace)" (featuring Monsta G & Jah Free)	2011	TJ
"Twerk"	2012	Askew One
"Because of You" (featuring (Spawnbreezie)	2012	Anthony Plant
"Swing" (with Joel Fletcher)	2014	
"Freaks" (with Timmy Trumpet)	2014	
"Take These Shots" (featuring ATP & DJ Butcher)	2014	AshCon Street Proz
"Like Michael Jackson"	2015	James Chappell
"Zooby Doo"	2016	Parris Entertainment

== Awards and nominations ==
=== APRA Awards ===
The APRA Awards are presented annually from 1982 by the Australasian Performing Right Association (APRA), "honouring composers and songwriters".

Year	Nominee / work	Award	Result	Ref.
2015	"Swing (Joel Fletcher Remix)"	Dance Work of the Year	Won	
2015	"Swing (Joel Fletcher Remix)"	Most Australian Played Work of the Year	Nominated	

=== Pacific Music Awards ===
Year	Nominated work	Award	Result
2006	Swing	Best Pacific Song	Won
2009	Swing	International Breakthrough	Won
2010	Savage Island	Best Pacific Urban Artist	Won
2010	Savage Island	Best Pacific Music Album	Nominated
2016	Freaks	NZ ON AIR RADIO AIRPLAY AWARD	Won
2016	Freaks	SPECIAL RECOGNITION AWARD – Outstanding Achievement	Won

=== New Zealand Music Awards ===
Year	Nominated work	Award	Result
2008		International Achievement	Won (shared with Flight of the Conchords)
2015		International Achievement	Won (shared with Lorde)
2015	Freaks	Highest Selling Single	Won

MTV Europe Music Awards

Year	Nominated work	Award	Result
2015	Like Michael Jackson	Best New Zealand Act	Won
