= Happily Ever After (song) =

Single by Case

from the album Personal Conversation
- Released: February 23, 1999
- Recorded: 1998
- Genre: R&B
- Length: 4:36
- Label: Def Jam
- Songwriter(s): Chris Henderson, Case Woodard
- Producer(s): Christopher "Deep" Henderson

Case singles chronology
"Faded Pictures" (1998)	"Happily Ever After" (1999)	"Think of You" (1999)

Music video
- "Case - Happily Ever After" on YouTube

Happily Ever After is the second single released from American R&B singer Case's 1999 second studio album Personal Conversation. The single reached number 3 on the Billboard R&B chart and number 15 on the Billboard Hot 100 chart. The song stayed on the Hot 100 charts for a total of twenty weeks. The music video features a young Beyoncé of Destiny's Child as Case's love interest.

== Charts ==
=== Weekly charts ===
Chart (1999)	Peak position
US Billboard Hot 100	15
US Hot R&B/Hip-Hop Songs (Billboard)	3
US Rhythmic (Billboard)	33

=== Year-end charts ===
Chart (1999)	Position
US Billboard Hot 100	72
US Hot R&B/Hip-Hop Songs (Billboard)	9
