= Lonely (Akon song) =

2005 single by Akon

- US single release

Single by Akon

from the album Trouble
- Released: February 22, 2005
- Genre: Pop; chipmunk soul; R&B
- Length: 3:55
- Label: SRC; Universal
- Songwriters: Bobby Vinton; Gene Allan; Aliaune Thiam
- Producer: Aliaune "Akon" Thiam

Akon singles chronology
| "Baby, I'm Back" (2005) | "Lonely" (2005) | "Moonshine" (2005) |

Music video
- "Lonely" on YouTube

"Lonely" is a song by American singer-songwriter Akon from his debut studio album, Trouble. Featuring a prominent, high-pitched sample of the 1962 song "Mr. Lonely" by Bobby Vinton, the single was released on February 22, 2005. "Lonely" reached number one in several countries, including in the United Kingdom, Australia, and Germany, where it stayed for eight weeks. It also entered the top five in France, where it reached number two, and in the United States, where it peaked at number four.

== Background ==
When Akon was signed by Universal imprint SRC Records it was "Lonely" that had immediately caught the attention of SRC A&R Jerome Foster and convinced him of Akon's talents. On hearing the demo track he had said, "This kid is official - this is a huge record." Despite offering the album's best option in terms of commercial breakthrough, SRC Records chose "Locked Up" over "Lonely" as the first single because SRC wanted to break Akon in the streets first and work towards a cross-over. According to Foster in an interview with HitQuarters, "Locked Up" is a street record. I thought that was the place for us to start to get a fan-base knowing that we had a record like "Lonely", which was more commercial, to follow it."

The song was written by Akon, Bobby Vinton, and Gene Allan. The lyrics are sung mainly by Akon as well as Bobby Vinton doing parts of the choruses, with Vinton's voice sped up reminiscent of Alvin and the Chipmunks. The song's tempo is 90 beats per minute in common time. "Lonely" is written in the key of C major.

== Track listings ==
UK CD1

1. "Lonely" (clean version) – 3:58
2. "Trouble Nobody" (explicit) – 3:21

UK CD2

1. "Lonely" (UK radio edit) – 3:33
2. "Trouble Nobody" (clean) – 3:21
3. "Kill the Dance (Got Something for Ya)" (featuring Kardinal Offishall) – 2:54
4. "Lonely" (video) – 3:58

US CD single

1. "Lonely" (clean version) – 3:58
2. "Lonely" (instrumental version) – 3:58
3. "Belly Dancer (Bananza)" (snippet) – 1:31

== Charts ==
The song was a number-one hit in several countries, including Australia, Austria, Denmark, the Netherlands, New Zealand, Belgium, and Switzerland. The song reached number two in France, Norway, and Sweden. The song also reached number 19 in Finland.

=== Weekly charts ===
| Chart (2005) | Peak position |
|---|---|
| Australia (ARIA) | 1 |
| Australian Urban (ARIA) | 1 |
| Austria (Ö3 Austria Top 40) | 1 |
| Belgium (Ultratop 50 Flanders) | 2 |
| Belgium (Ultratop 50 Wallonia) | 2 |
| Canada CHR/Pop Top 30 (Radio & Records) | 2 |
| CIS Airplay (TopHit) | 14 |
| Czech Republic (Rádio Top 100 Oficiální) | 1 |
| Denmark (Tracklisten) | 1 |
| Europe (Eurochart Hot 100) | 1 |
| Finland (Suomen virallinen lista) | 19 |
| France (SNEP) | 2 |
| Germany (GfK) | 1 |
| Hungary (Rádiós Top 40) | 15 |
| Hungary (Dance Top 40) | 21 |
| Ireland (IRMA) | 1 |
| Netherlands (Dutch Top 40) | 1 |
| Netherlands (Single Top 100) | 1 |
| New Zealand (Recorded Music NZ) | 1 |
| Norway (VG-lista) | 2 |
| Poland (Polish Airplay Chart) | 8 |
| Russia Airplay (TopHit) | 14 |
| Scottish Singles Sales (Official Charts) | 1 |
| Sweden (Sverigetopplistan) | 2 |
| Switzerland (Schweizer Hitparade) | 1 |
| UK Singles (Official Charts) | 1 |
| UK Hip Hop/R&B (Official Charts) | 1 |
| Ukraine Airplay (TopHit) | 133 |
| US Billboard Hot 100 | 4 |
| US Hot R&B/Hip-Hop Songs (Billboard) | 4 |
| US Pop Airplay (Billboard) | 5 |
| US Rhythmic Airplay (Billboard) | 4 |

| Chart (2023) | Peak position |
|---|---|
| Hungary (Single Top 40) | 33 |

=== Year-end charts ===
| Chart (2005) | Position |
|---|---|
| Australia (ARIA) | 3 |
| Austria (Ö3 Austria Top 40) | 3 |
| Belgium (Ultratop 50 Flanders) | 10 |
| Belgium (Ultratop 50 Wallonia) | 5 |
| Brazil (Crowley) | 11 |
| CIS Airplay (TopHit) | 59 |
| Germany (Media Control GfK) | 3 |
| Hungary (Rádiós Top 40) | 52 |
| Netherlands (Dutch Top 40) | 12 |
| Netherlands (Single Top 100) | 15 |
| New Zealand (RIANZ) | 15 |
| Romania (Romanian Top 100) | 23 |
| Russia Airplay (TopHit) | 51 |
| Sweden (Hitlistan) | 14 |
| Switzerland (Schweizer Hitparade) | 4 |
| UK Singles (OCC) | 7 |
| US Billboard Hot 100 | 44 |
| US Mainstream Top 40 (Billboard) | 51 |
| US Rhythmic Top 40 (Billboard) | 37 |

=== Decade-end charts ===
| Chart (2000–2009) | Position |
|---|---|
| Australia (ARIA) | 49 |
| Germany (Media Control GfK) | 55 |

== Certifications ==
| Region | Certification | Certified units/sales |
|---|---|---|
| Australia (ARIA) | 2× Platinum | 140,000^{^} |
| Austria (IFPI Austria) | Gold | 15,000^{*} |
| Belgium (BRMA) | Gold | 25,000^{*} |
| Brazil (Pro-Música Brasil) DMS | Platinum | 60,000^{*} |
| Brazil (Pro-Música Brasil) | Diamond | 250,000^{‡} |
| Denmark (IFPI Danmark) | Gold | 4,000^{^} |
| Germany (BVMI) | Gold | 150,000^{‡} |
| Italy (FIMI) | Gold | 50,000^{‡} |
| New Zealand (RMNZ) | 3× Platinum | 90,000^{‡} |
| Spain (Promusicae) | Gold | 30,000^{‡} |
| Sweden (GLF) | Gold | 10,000^{^} |
| Switzerland (IFPI Switzerland) | Gold | 20,000^{^} |
| United Kingdom (BPI) | 2× Platinum | 1,200,000^{‡} |
| United States (RIAA) | 4× Platinum | 4,000,000^{‡} |
| United States (RIAA) Mastertone | Platinum | 1,000,000^{*} |
^{*} Sales figures based on certification alone.^{^} Shipments figures based on certification alone.^{‡} Sales+streaming figures based on certification alone.

== Release history ==
| Region | Date | Format(s) | Label(s) | Ref. |
|---|---|---|---|---|
| United States | February 22, 2005 | Rhythmic contemporary; contemporary hit radio | SRC; Universal | |
| United States | April 4, 2005 | Urban radio | SRC; Universal | |
| United Kingdom | May 2, 2005 | 12-inch vinyl; CD | SRC; Universal | |
| Australia | July 4, 2005 | CD | SRC; Universal | |
