= Open Letter (Case album) =

Studio album by Case
- Released: April 24, 2001
- Genre: R&B
- Length: 59:59
- Label: Def Soul; Def Jam
- Producer: Shep Crawford; Jimmy Jam and Terry Lewis; Arvel McClinton III; Redhead; Tim & Bob; Ray Watkins

Case chronology
Personal Conversation (1999)	Open Letter (2001)	The Rose Experience (2009)

Singles from Open Letter
- 1. "Missing You" Released: February 20, 2001; 2. "Not Your Friend" Released: 2001

Open Letter is the third studio album by American R&B singer Case. It was released by Def Soul, the R&B division of Def Jam Recordings, on April 24, 2001 in the United States. The album peaked at number five on the US Billboard 200 and was certified Gold by the Recording Industry Association of America (RIAA). It was preceded by the Tim & Bob-produced single "Missing You", which earned Case a nomination for Best Male R&B Vocal Performance at the 44th Grammy Awards in 2002. Open Letter was Case's last album on Def Soul and Def Jam Recordings.

== Critical reception ==
Professional ratings
Review scores
Source	Rating
AllMusic	1.5/5 stars
Blender	2/5 stars
Vibe	3.5/5 stars

Vibe contributor David Thigpen gave note of the "earthier, more robust brand of R&B" that Case performs throughout the record, saying his songwriting resembles the "strong melodies and complex, rich arrangements" of R. Kelly and found tracks like "Love of My Life" and "Shine" containing influences of "late '70s Stevie Wonder-style soul." He concluded that, "Case is no dusty retro-soulstar, though. Draped in old-school rhythms, his earnestly romantic messages still sound fresh." Neil Drumming of Blender said that Case lacked conviction in delivering sexual lyrics but that the overall vibe of the songs help mask it, concluding that "Fortunately, the romance here outweighs the horizontal hula roughly five to one. So there is a place for Case — just not in the bedroom." Jon Azpiri of AllMusic criticized the album for containing generic R&B compositions and Case for lacking emotion in his performance, concluding that "For his third album, Case fails to create even one original moment; perhaps this Open Letter should have never been written."

== Track listing ==
No.	Title	Writer(s)	Producer(s)	Length
1.	"Missing You"	Tim Kelley; Bob Robinson; Joe Thomas; Joshua Thompson	Tim & Bob	4:45
2.	"Shine"	Case Woodard; David Guppy	Redhead	4:33
3.	"A Song for Skye"	Woodard; Ray Watkins	Watkins	6:13
4.	"Not Your Friend"	Woodard; Kelley; Robinson; Hayes	Tim & Bob	4:34
5.	"Driving"	Eric Roberson; Watkins	Watkins	4:35
6.	"Sex Games"	Woodard; Kelley; Robinson	Tim & Bob	4:34
7.	"Conversate"	Woodard; Kelley; Robinson	Tim & Bob	4:28
8.	"Love of My Life"	Woodard; Guppy; Roberson	Redhead	4:18
9.	"Wishful Thinking"	Woodard; Guppy; Roberson	Redhead	3:33
10.	"Crooked Letter"	Tonee MccClinton; Karylton Clanton	MccClinton	3:36
11.	"Already Have"	Woodard; Shep Crawford; Eritza Laues	Montell Jordan	4:45
12.	"No Regrets"	Woodard; James Harris III; Terry Lewis	Jimmy Jam and Terry Lewis	5:31
13.	"Even Though"	Woodard; Kelley; Robinson	Tim & Bob	4:27

== Personnel ==
Credits adapted from the album's liner notes.

- Keyboards and Drum Programming: Tim Kelley, Bob Robinson, Ray Watkins, Redhead, Shep Crawford, Arvel McClinton, Harold Edgar
- Bass: Daryl Edgar
- Guitar: Steve Estiverne, Andeas Panagapolous
- Background vocals: Case, Gromyko Collins, David Guppy, Eric Roberson, Larry "Jazz" Anthony, Eritza Laues, Shep Crawford, Montell Jordan, Charlie Wilson
- Recording engineer: Jan Fairchild, Giz, Mike T., Stephen George, Andy Heller, Eddie Hudson, Annie Catalino
- Mixing: Jan Fairchild, Serban Ghenea, Stephen George, Jan Fairchild
- Executive producer: Case, JoJo "Bangs" Brim, Kevin Liles
- Art direction & design: Akisia Grigsby

== Charts ==
=== Weekly charts ===
Chart (2001)	Peak position
US Billboard 200	5
US Top R&B/Hip-Hop Albums (Billboard)	2

=== Year-end charts ===
Chart (2001)	Position
US Billboard 200	179
US Top R&B/Hip-Hop Albums (Billboard)	59

== Certifications ==
Region	Certification	Certified units/sales
United States (RIAA)	Gold	500,000^{^}
^{^} Shipments figures based on certification alone.
