= The Rose Experience =

Studio album by Case
- Released: March 24, 2009
- Length: 58:24
- Label: Indigo Blue
- Producers: Joey Bangs; Shawn Campbell; Marshall Leathers; Chris Liggio; Jazz Nixon; Blaxl Rose; Tim & Bob; Phil Weatherspoon; Mario Winans

Case chronology
| Open Letter (2001) | The Rose Experience (2009) | Here, My Love (2010) |

Singles from The Rose Experience
- 1. "Shoulda Known Betta" Released: September 25, 2004; 2. "Lovely" Released: December 2, 2008

The Rose Experience is the fourth studio album by American R&B singer Case. It was released by Indigo Blue Music on March 24, 2009, marking his debut with the independent label following his departure from Def Jam Recordings. "Lovely" was released as the album's first single.

== Critical reception ==
Allmusic editor Paula Carino wrote, "when he hits his vocal stride, no one is smoother than Case. This 2009 release highlights the singer's sweet high register and ultra-romantic lyrics ("Be That Man"), and the songs are a little more reflective and mature than previous efforts, indicating a real heart and soul behind the voice."

== Track listing ==
The Rose Experience — Standard edition
| No. | Title | Writer(s) | Producer(s) | Length |
|---|---|---|---|---|
| 1. | "Be That Man" | J.J. Roston; Marshall Leathers; Shawn Campbell; N. Tyrell; The Professionals | Leathers; Campbell | 3:55 |
| 2. | "Lovely" | Case Woodard; Chris Liggio | Liggio | 3:43 |
| 3. | "Déjà Vu" | Woodard; Tim Kelley; Bob Robinson | Tim & Bob | 4:35 |
| 4. | "Betcha Don't Know Y" | Woodard; Liggio; Felicia Adams | Liggio | 4:59 |
| 5. | "Let Me Down Easy" | Woodard; Liggio; Joseph "JoJo" Brim | Liggio; Joey Bangs; Blaxl Rose | 3:59 |
| 6. | "Turns Me On" | Roston; Leathers; Campbell; The Professionals | Leathers; Campbell | 3:48 |
| 7. | "I Can't" | Mario Winans; Mike Winans | Mario Winans | 3:36 |
| 8. | "Shoulda Known Better" (Ghostface Killah) | Woodard; Dennis Coles; Liggio | Liggio | 4:18 |
| 9. | "Me and You" | Woodard; Liggio; Brim | Liggio | 4:25 |
| 10. | "Smile" | Aaron Hall; Teddy Riley | Liggio | 4:16 |
| 11. | "Waiting (Interlude)" | Woodard | Phil Weatherspoon | 1:50 |
| 12. | "Can I Be" | Woodard; Liggio | Liggio; Bangs; Rose | 5:20 |
| 13. | "Can't Believe" | Woodard; Jazz Nixon | Nixon | 4:25 |
| 14. | "Place to Stay" | Dave Hollister | Liggio | 5:38 |

== Charts ==
| Chart (2009) | Peak position |
|---|---|
| US Billboard 200 | 111 |
| US Top R&B/Hip-Hop Albums (Billboard) | 22 |
