= Missing You (Case song) =

Single by Case

from the album Open Letter
- Released: February 2001
- Recorded: 2000
- Genre: R&B
- Length: 4:44
- Label: Def Jam
- Songwriters: Tim Kelley, Bob Robinson, Joe Thomas, Joshua Paul Thompson
- Producer: Tim & Bob

Case singles chronology
| "The Best Man I Can Be" (1999) | "Missing You" (2001) | "Not Your Friend" (2001) |

"Missing You" is a song by American R&B singer Case. It was produced by Tim & Bob and released in February 2001 as the lead single from the album Open Letter. The song was also included in the soundtrack to Nutty Professor II: The Klumps. The song itself is a cover of the same song done by Joe the year before and originally appeared on the European version of his 2000 album My Name Is Joe. The hit song spent four weeks at number-one on the US R&B chart.

The song was covered by George Benson on his album Irreplaceable.

== Charts ==
| Chart (2001) | Peak position |
|---|---|
| US Billboard Hot 100 | 4 |
| US Billboard Hot R&B/Hip-Hop Songs | 1 |

== Awards and nominations ==
- Grammy Awards
  - 2002, Best R&B Vocal Performance - Male (nominated)
