= Personal Conversation =

Studio album by Case
- Released: April 20, 1999
- Genre: R&B
- Length: 49:57
- Label: Def Soul; Def Jam
- Producer: Fats, Joe, Christopher "Deep" Henderson, Anthony Dent, JoJo Brim & Kevin "Big Kev" McDaniels, Nathan Morris, Kowan Paul & Milton Thornton, Walter "Mucho" Scott, Kenny "Smoove" Konegay, Sprague "Doogie" Williams, Edward "Eddie F." Ferrell

Case chronology
Case (1996)	Personal Conversation (1999)	Open Letter (2001)

Singles from Personal Conversation
- 1. "Faded Pictures" Released: September 15, 1998; 2. "Happily Ever After" Released: February 23, 1999; 3. "Think of You" Released: September 14, 1999

Personal Conversation is the second studio album by American R&B singer Case. It was released by the Def Soul subsidiary of Def Jam Recordings on April 20, 1999. It features the hit single "Happily Ever After". The album was certified Gold by the Recording Industry Association of America (RIAA).

== Critical reception ==
Professional ratings
Review scores
Source	Rating
AllMusic	2.5/5 stars

Jose F. Promis of AllMusic said that Case is at his strongest "when the songs are mid- to up-tempo," and found the slow jams tending to meander towards the album's end and "a little less interesting than the others", noting how he comes across as "a sentimental and earnest singer, who delivers his sincere messages straight from the heart." He concludes that, "Perhaps this can explain this singer's enduring appeal, which has resulting in his being one of the most consistent and successful R&B singers to have emerged in the 1990s." Vibe contributor Craig Seymour was critical of Case's vocal performance throughout the record, saying his voice "lacks the soul pathos of an R. Kelly, nor does he have the dewy R&B feel of his buddy Joe" on the ballads and "isn't fluid enough to ignite the warmed-over samples he uses" on the upbeat tracks, concluding that "[T]he album might be a bit boring but, knowing Case, he's probably only another choice collaboration away from scoring a third hit."

== Track listing ==
Personal Conversation — Standard edition
No.	Title	Writer(s)	Producer(s)	Length
1.	"Personal Conversation (Intro)"	Case Woodard; Keith Winfield; Kenny Kornegay; Maduro Hill; L. Jean Pierre	Fats	1:15
2.	"Happily Ever After"	Woodard; Chris Henderson	Henderson	4:36
3.	"Think of You"	Kowan Paul; Milton Thorton; Nathan Morris	Paul; Thorton; Morris	3:30
4.	"Faded Pictures" (featuring Joe)	Joseph Thomas; Joshua Thompson	Joe	3:49
5.	"Tell Me"	Joseph "Jo-Jo" Brim; Woodard; Kevin "Big Kev" McDaniels; Stevie Wonder	Brim; Woodard; McDaniels	4:41
6.	"If"	Anthony Dent; Woodard; Jeff Lorber	Dent	4:20
7.	"Can't Force Love (Interlude)"	Brim; McDaniels	Brim; McDaniels	0:39
8.	"Caught You"	Bernard Belle; Ray Watkins; Walter "Mucho" Scott	Scott; Brim^{[a]}; Sprague "Doogie" Williams^{[a]}	4:39
9.	"He Don't Love You"	Woodard; Kornegay; Londell Smith; Watkins; Scott	Scott; Kornegay^{[a]}	4:40
10.	"Another Minute"	Woodard; McDaniels; Williams	McDaniels; Williams	4:35
11.	"Where Did Our Love Go"	Andrew Noland; Darryl Young; Gregory Webster; Kornegay; Lee Drakeford; Leroy Bonner; Marshall Jones; Marvin Pierce; Norman Napier; Ralph Middlebrooks; Walter Morrison	Young; Kornegay	4:23
12.	"Faded Pictures" (Soul Central Version Remix)	Joe Sample; Thomas; Thompson	Darren Lighty; Eddie F	3:59
13.	"Scandalous" (featuring Cam'ron)	Cameron Giles; Woodard; Kornegay; Michael Small; Nathaniel Hall; Sammy Burwell; Tara Geter-Tillman	Kornegay	3:39
14.	"Having My Baby"	Woodard; Brim; McDaniels	Brim; McDaniels	2:20

Notes

- ^{^a} denotes co-producer

== Charts ==
=== Weekly charts ===
Chart (1999)	Peak position
US Billboard 200	33
US Top R&B/Hip-Hop Albums (Billboard)	5

=== Year-end charts ===
Chart (1999)	Position
US Billboard 200	142
US Top R&B/Hip-Hop Albums (Billboard)	35

== Certifications ==
Region	Certification	Certified units/sales
United States (RIAA)	Gold	500,000^{^}
^{^} Shipments figures based on certification alone.
