= Never Gonna Get It =

Never Gonna Get It may refer to:

- "My Lovin' (You're Never Gonna Get It)", a 1992 song by En Vogue
- "Never Gonna Get It", a song by Sean Biggs from the deluxe version of Akon's 2004 album Trouble
