= My Hood =

Single by Young Jeezy

from the album Let's Get It: Thug Motivation 101
- Released: December 11, 2005
- Recorded: 2005
- Genre: Hip hop; southern hip-hop; gangsta rap
- Length: 4:00
- Label: CTE, Def Jam Records
- Songwriters: Jay Jenkins, Cordale Quinn
- Producer: Lil' C

Young Jeezy singles chronology
"Get Throwed" (2005)	"My Hood" (2005)	"Say I" (2006)

"My Hood" is a song by American rapper Young Jeezy, released December 11, 2005 as the fourth single from his debut studio album Let's Get It: Thug Motivation 101 (2005). The song, produced by Grand Hustle in-house producer Cordale "Lil' C" Quinn, contains an interpolation of "Rubber Band Man" as performed by T.I.

The music video, directed by Hype Williams, is in black and white, with a few pockets of color. "My Hood" was Derek Jeter's walk-out music for his at bats during the 2006 Major League baseball season.

== Reception ==
Sean Fennessey of Pitchfork described "My Hood" as "blissful, thanks to a chintzy Casio beat and some sort of My Hood=Our Hood claptrap" despite considering it "cheap, easy, and out of character for the steadily mean-mugged Jeezy". Christian Hoard of Rolling Stone called it "the album's most head-noddable track", praising Young Jeezy's "hypnotically smooth rhymes". In a more negative review, Steve Juon of RapReviews wrote that the song "sounds like a really bad version of T.I.'s "Rubber Band Man"."

== Charts ==
Chart (2006)	Peak position
US Billboard Hot 100	77
US Hot R&B/Hip-Hop Songs (Billboard)	30
US Hot Rap Songs (Billboard)	19
US Pop 100 (Billboard)	93
US Rhythmic Airplay (Billboard)	24

== Release history ==
Region	Date	Format(s)	Label(s)	Ref.
United States	November 8, 2005	Rhythmic contemporary radio	Def Jam, IDJMG	
