= And Then What =

Single by Young Jeezy featuring Mannie Fresh

from the album Let's Get It: Thug Motivation 101
- Released: June 7, 2005
- Recorded: 2004
- Genre: Crunk
- Length: 4:05
- Label: Corporate Thugz; Sho'nuff; Def Jam
- Songwriters: Jay Jenkins; Byron Thomas
- Producer: Mannie Fresh

Young Jeezy singles chronology
"Icy" (2005)	"And Then What" (2005)	"Soul Survivor" (2005)

"And Then What" is the debut single written and performed by American rapper Young Jeezy. It was released in mid-2005 as the first single from his debut album Let's Get It: Thug Motivation 101. It was produced by and features Mannie Fresh. The official music video features cameo appearances by Fabolous, Bun B, Lil Scrappy, 2 Chainz and Dr. Dre.

== Charts ==
=== Weekly charts ===
Chart (2005)	Peak position
US Billboard Hot 100	67
US Hot R&B/Hip-Hop Songs (Billboard)	14
US Hot Rap Songs (Billboard)	13
US Rhythmic Airplay (Billboard)	38

=== Year-end charts ===
Chart (2005)	Position
US Hot R&B/Hip-Hop Songs (Billboard)	66
