= Khamari =

American singer (born 1993)

- Born: Khamari Barnes; 20 April 1993 (age 33); Boston, Massachusetts, U.S.
- Genres: R&B; pop; soul; emo R&B; alternative rock
- Occupations: Singer; songwriter; record producer
- Instruments: Vocals
- Years active: 2020–present
- Labels: Encore Recordings; RCA (former); Since '93
- Website: khamari.com

Khamari Barnes (born 20 April 1993), known mononymously as Khamari, is an American singer, songwriter, and record producer from Boston, Massachusetts. He signed with RCA Records to release his debut studio album A Brief Nirvana (2023), which was met with positive critical reception despite limited commercial attention.

== Early life ==
Khamari Barnes was born and raised in Boston, Massachusetts. He grew up in the Dorchester neighborhood, off Blue Hill Avenue. Barnes began playing violin at age four. He later studied and taught himself piano, guitar, clarinet, flute, and French horn. According to interviews, his grandfather purchased his first keyboard and allowed him to set up recording equipment in his attic, where he began making music. During his youth, he cited influences including Stevie Wonder, Sly Stone, The Beatles, Usher, and J. Cole.

== Career ==
Khamari’s career began with the release of his debut project, the extended play Eldorado, on 23 October 2020. The EP comprises six tracks. He then went quiet for 13 months, returning on 12 November 2021 with "Doctor, My Eyes". The track went viral, amassing over 70 million streams on Spotify. It was produced by Khamari himself alongside co-producers Johan Lenox and Trackside. The music video was released in January 2022. He followed up with the singles "Drifting" and "Tell Me".

2023 marked a further breakthrough as his single "These Four Walls" entered the Billboard charts. The single stands at 31 million streams on Spotify, as of September 2026, and was produced by Adam Rahman, Paul Lorton, and Trackside. Later that year, on 26 May 2023, Khamari released his debut studio album, A Brief Nirvana. "Doctor, My Eyes" and "These Four Walls" served as the album’s lead and second singles respectively.

In August 2024, he released the single "Cranes in the Sky", a cover of singer Solange's 2016 song of the same name. On 25 July 2025, he put out "Lonely in the Jungle" via Encore Recordings. One month later, his second studio album, To Dry a Tear, arrived, with "Lonely in the Jungle" acting as its lead single.

== Musical style ==
Barnes is known for a falsetto vocal delivery. His lyrics have been described as confessional and personal. His music blends contemporary R&B with elements of 1970s and 1990s soul, pop, and alternative rock. The arrangements often feature guitar and piano, drawing on his background in classical training and multi-instrumental performance.

== Discography ==
=== Albums ===
Title	Details
Eldorado (EP)	Release date: 23 October 2020; Label: Indie; Format: Digital download
A Brief Nirvana	Release date: 26 May 2023; Label: RCA; Format: Digital download
To Dry a Tear	Release date: 22 August 2025; Label: Encore Recordings; Format: Digital download
