= Locked Up (song) =

Single by Akon

from the album Trouble
- Released: April 5, 2004
- Genre: R&B; hip-hop
- Length: 3:56
- Label: SRC; Universal
- Songwriter: Akon
- Producer: Akon

Akon singles chronology
"Operations of Nature" (1996)	"Locked Up" (2004)	"Find Us" (2004)

Music video
- "Locked Up ft. Styles P" on YouTube

"Locked Up" is a song by Senegalese-American singer Akon, taken as the lead single from his 2004 debut album, Trouble. The single was released in the United States on April 5, 2004, peaking at number eight on the Billboard Hot 100. Outside of the United States, "Locked Up" peaked within the top 10 of the charts in Ireland and the United Kingdom and the top 20 of the charts in France, Germany, Spain, and Switzerland.

== Background ==
Although it was widely regarded that "Lonely" offered Akon's 2004 debut album Trouble's best option in terms of commercial breakthrough and lead single as well as first single, SRC A&R and producer Knobody chose "Locked Up" as the first and lead single because he wanted to break Akon in the streets first, and then cross-over. In an interview for HitQuarters, he claimed: "Locked Up" is a street record. I thought that was the place for us to start to get a fan-base, knowing that weight. We thought really carefully about the record, what touches people and will get people's attention – so we added references of his kin and kith sending him magazines, money-orders, to visit him, ask where his lawyer is, accept his phone calls and ask "where're my niggaz on lockdown." The song was designed a breakout hit for Akon, something that could shape the future of his personal life and widely successful musical career. I worked on what I call "drops" – points in the record where it feels different, to break the monotony and make it a little more interesting."

== Remixes and other versions ==
Knobody produced an alternate of the song, featuring Styles P, which appears as both a B-side on the single and as a bonus track on the UK version of the album Trouble.

In 2004, T-Pain sampled the song in a parody recording "I'm Fucked Up", which became a main factor in him getting signed to Konvict Kartel. New Zealand rapper Savage appears on a remix on the song that was later included on his debut album, Moonshine, in 2005.

The same year, the song was sampled in the track "Won't Let Me Out" by C-Murder from his album The Truest Shit I Ever Said. A music video was produced to promote the single. The video was directed by FlyyKai, and was edited to both the album version and the remix featuring Styles P. The French CD single also has a remix featuring French rapper Booba, which is also Akon's favorite "Locked Up" remix.

Another remix featuring Styles and British rapper Taz was included on the UK version of Trouble.

A remixed version of the song was released on September 4, 2020, by American rapper 6ix9ine titled "Locked Up, Pt. 2" appears on his second studio album, TattleTales (2020).

A version by EDM artists Steve Aoki and Trinix was released in August 2023; it appeared on Aoki's eighth album Hiroquest 2: Double Helix, released in November of the same year.

== Controversy surrounding Akon's criminal past claims ==
Despite his history of presenting himself as someone with a long criminal past, which was further fueled by "Locked Up," Akon's only criminal conviction by this point in time was in fact only a conviction in New Jersey on a gun charge which resulted in him only getting three years probation and no prison time.

== Track listings ==
UK CD single

1. "Locked Up" – 3:56
2. "Locked Up" (featuring Styles P) – 3:50
3. "Locked Up" (featuring Taz and Styles P) – 3:54
4. "Locked Up" (video; featuring Taz and Styles P) – 3:54

UK 12-inch vinyl

1. "Locked Up" – 3:56
2. "Locked Up" (featuring Styles P) – 3:50
3. "Locked Up" (featuring Taz and Styles P) – 3:54
4. "Locked Up" (instrumental) – 3:56

German CD single

1. "Locked Up" (featuring Azad) – 3:50
2. "Locked Up" (Without Rap) – 3:33
3. "Locked Up" (featuring Styles P) – 3:50
4. "Gunshot" – 2:56

== Charts ==
=== Weekly charts ===
Chart (2004–2005)	Peak position
Australian Urban (ARIA)	14
Austria (Ö3 Austria Top 40)	64
Belgium (Ultratop 50 Wallonia)	26
Canada CHR/Pop Top 30 (Radio & Records)	27
Europe (Eurochart Hot 100)	8
France (SNEP)	12
Germany (GfK)	15
Ireland (IRMA)	10
Netherlands (Single Top 100)	71
Scottish Singles Sales (Official Charts)	16
Spain (Promusicae)	19
Switzerland (Schweizer Hitparade)	19
UK Singles (Official Charts)	5
UK Hip Hop/R&B (Official Charts)	3
US Billboard Hot 100	8
US Hot R&B/Hip-Hop Songs (Billboard)	6
US Pop Airplay (Billboard)	29
US Rhythmic Airplay (Billboard)	4

=== Year-end charts ===
Chart (2004)	Position
US Billboard Hot 100	44
US Hot R&B/Hip-Hop Singles & Tracks (Billboard)	32
US Rhythmic Top 40 (Billboard)	25

Chart (2005)	Position
Belgium (Ultratop 50 Wallonia)	99
Europe (Eurochart Hot 100)	78
France (SNEP)	91
Germany (Media Control GfK)	93
Switzerland (Schweizer Hitparade)	100
UK Singles (OCC)	56
UK Urban (Music Week)	6

== Certifications ==
Region	Certification	Certified units/sales
Brazil (Pro-Música Brasil)	Platinum	60,000^{*}
Denmark (IFPI Danmark)	Gold	45,000^{‡}
New Zealand (RMNZ)	3× Platinum	90,000^{‡}
United Kingdom (BPI)	Platinum	600,000^{‡}
United States (RIAA)	2× Platinum	2,000,000^{‡}
^{*} Sales figures based on certification alone.^{‡} Sales+streaming figures based on certification alone.

== Release history ==
Region	Date	Format(s)	Label(s)	Ref.
United States	April 5, 2004	Rhythmic contemporary; urban radio	SRC; Universal	
United States	September 14, 2004	Contemporary hit radio	SRC; Universal	
United Kingdom	February 21, 2005	12-inch vinyl; CD	SRC; Universal	
Australia	May 16, 2005	CD	SRC; Universal	
