= Go Crazy (Young Jeezy song) =

Single by Young Jeezy featuring Jay-Z

from the album Let's Get It: Thug Motivation 101
- Released: August 16, 2005
- Genre: Hip-hop
- Length: 4:13 (album remix version); 3:19 (single version)
- Label: Def Jam; Corporate Thugz; Sho'nuff
- Songwriters: Jenkins; Donald Cannon
- Producer: Don Cannon

Young Jeezy singles chronology
| "Soul Survivor" (2005) | "Go Crazy" (2005) | "Get Throwed" (2005) |

Jay-Z singles chronology
| "Dear Summer" (2005) | "Go Crazy" (2005) | "Get Throwed" (2005) |

"Go Crazy" is a song by American rapper Young Jeezy, released as the third single from his debut album Let's Get It: Thug Motivation 101. The song was written by Jeezy and produced by Don Cannon. The CD single was released on August 30, 2005. It samples the song "(Man, Oh Man) I Want To Go Back" by The Impressions. The single was released through Def Jam Recordings, Young Jeezy's Corporate Thugz Entertainment and Jazze Pha's Sho'nuff Records.

Pitchfork listed it as the 359th best song of the 2000s.

== Background ==
The instrumental was first used by rapper T.I. for a freestyle on his mixtape, Down With The King. Jeezy ended up using the beat for his album. After, an extended version of the album version leaked online featuring Jeezy's original 3 verses, in addition to new verses by Jay-Z and Fat Joe. The official single version used Jay-Z's verse from the extended version that leaked earlier, with the first and third verse from Jeezy's original album version. It is rumored Fat Joe was removed due to the tensions between himself and Jay-Z. Later pressings of Jeezy's album replaced the original album version of the song with the single version.

== Charts ==
| Chart (2005) | Peak position |
|---|---|
| US Bubbling Under Hot 100 (Billboard) | 3 |
| US Hot R&B/Hip-Hop Songs (Billboard) | 22 |
| US Hot Rap Songs (Billboard) | 22 |

== Certifications ==
| Region | Certification | Certified units/sales |
|---|---|---|
| United States (RIAA) | Gold | 500,000^{‡} |
^{‡} Sales+streaming figures based on certification alone.
