= Here, My Love =

2010 album by Case

Studio album by Case
- Released: June 15, 2010
- Genre: Soul
- Length: 41:14
- Labels: Real Talk; Fontana
- Producers: Big Hollis; Cozmo

Case chronology
The Rose Experience (2009)	Here, My Love (2010)	Heaven's Door (2015)

Here, My Love is the fifth studio album by American R&B singer Case. It was released on June 15, 2010 through Real Talk Entertainment.

== Track list ==
No.	Title	Length
1.	"Back Again"	1:27
2.	"Foreplay"	4:02
3.	"I'm Ready"	4:36
4.	"Old Fashion Lovin'"	3:12
5.	"Labels"	3:26
6.	"Love 2 Love"	3:28
7.	"Jealousy"	4:06
8.	"Here"	1:22
9.	"Just Leave"	4:05
10.	"My Love"	1:46
11.	"Feels So Long"	4:21
12.	"She's Gone"	1:26
13.	"Labels (Remix)"	3:57

== Charts ==
Chart (2010)	Peak position
US Top R&B/Hip-Hop Albums (Billboard)	58
