= The Best Man I Can Be =

1999 single by Tyrese Gibson, Next, Ginuwine, Case

Single by Ginuwine, RL, Tyrese and Case

from the album The Best Man: Music from the Motion Picture
- Released: October 29, 1999
- Recorded: 1999
- Genre: R&B
- Length: 6:31
- Label: Columbia; Sony
- Songwriters: Robert Lavelle Huggar; Tyrese Darnell Gibson; Case Woodard; Terry Brown; Raphael Brown; Elgin Baylor Lumpkin; Terry Lewis; Big Jim Wright
- Producers: Jam & Lewis; Big Jim Wright

Ginuwine singles chronology
| "None of Ur Friends Business" (1999) | "The Best Man I Can Be" (1999) | "It Wasn't Me" (2000) |

RL singles chronology
| "We Can't Be Friends" (1999) | "The Best Man I Can Be" (1999) | "Good Love" (2001) |

Tyrese singles chronology
| "Lately" (1999) | "The Best Man I Can Be" (1999) | "I Like Them Girls" (2001) |

Case singles chronology
| "Think Of You" (1999) | "The Best Man I Can Be" (1999) | "Missing You" (2001) |

"The Best Man I Can Be" is a 1999 song for the film The Best Man. It features four R&B singers: Ginuwine, RL of Next, Tyrese and Case.

== Credits and personnel ==
Credits lifted from the liner notes of The Best Man.

- James Harris III – producer, writer
- Terry Lewis – producer, writer
- Steve Rodge – mixing engineer
- Big Jim Wright – additional background vocals, co-producer, writer
- Xavier – mixing assistant

== Charts ==
=== Weekly charts ===
| Chart (1999–2000) | Peak position |
|---|---|
| US Billboard Hot 100 | 77 |
| US Hot R&B/Hip-Hop Songs (Billboard) | 20 |
| US Adult R&B Songs (Billboard) | 5 |

=== Year-end charts ===
| Chart (2000) | Position |
|---|---|
| US Hot R&B/Hip-Hop Songs (Billboard) | 61 |
