= Shakir Stewart =

American record producer (1974–2008)

Shakir Stewart (April 12, 1974 – November 1, 2008), a native of Oakland, California, was an American record producer and record executive in a number of companies, the latest being Def Jam. At the time of his death he was the Senior Vice President of Island Def Jam Music Group and the Executive Vice President of Def Jam.

== Biography ==
After graduating from Morehouse College in Atlanta, Stewart used the money he had made from throwing parties at college to build a small studio with a couple of friends. The group then signed several young producers in the Atlanta area.

Stewart's skills as a talent magnet were recognized by Antonio "L.A." Reid, who at the time was just starting the company Hitco Music Publishing, and saw him as someone with "a finger on the pulse of the next generation of hot producers in the Atlanta music scene". At the time Reid was trying to connect to a wholly different market of producers and songwriters and so offered Stewart his first position as an intern-level creative person. Reid called him his right-hand man.

In 2000, he was appointed A&R consultant at LaFace Records signing Ciara to the label. He stayed there until 2004. From 2004 he served as vice president and then senior vice president of A&R for Def Jam. He signed Atlanta rapper Young Jeezy and Miami rapper Rick Ross. Stewart was listed as an executive producer for Young Jeezy's 2005 album, Let's Get It: Thug Motivation 101, which sold over two million copies in America. In June 2008, he was appointed as Executive Vice President of Def Jam where he had replaced Jay-Z, a position left vacant since December 2007.

In addition to discovering new talent Stewart oversaw various projects as Def Jam VP of A&R, including Nas, LL Cool J, and Brutha.

== Death ==
On November 1, 2008, Stewart was found in the bathroom of his home in the Atlanta suburb of Marietta with a self-inflicted gunshot wound. He was pronounced dead at a nearby hospital.

Def Jam stated that Stewart was "a truly incredible friend and father who was an inspiration to not only our artists and employees, but to his family and the many people who had the privilege of counting him as a friend." LA Reid stated "whatever his problems were, he kept them hidden... to this day I miss him...the loss was devastating."

In 2014 singer Karina Pasian released a tribute to Stewart, who had been a mentor to her.
