= Case (Case album) =

Studio album by Case
- Released: August 13, 1996
- Studios: Funhouse Recordings (Valhalla, NY); Quad Studios (New York, NY); Unique Recordings (New York, NY)
- Genre: R&B
- Length: 47:00
- Label: Def Jam
- Producers: Prince Charles Alexander; Joseph "Jo-Jo" Brim; Terence Dudley; Christopher "Roc Head" Kellam; Kenny "K-Smoove" Kornegay (exec.); James "Jimmy" Maynes; Kevin "Big Kev" McDaniel; Darryl "88" Young

Case chronology
Case (1996)	Personal Conversation (1999)

Singles from Case
- 1. "More to Love" Released: January 23, 1996; 2. "Touch Me, Tease Me" Released: April 30, 1996; 3. "Don't Be Afraid" Released: July 12, 1996; 4. "I Gotcha" Released: October 29, 1996

Case is the debut album by American singer Case. It was released by Def Jam Recordings on August 13, 1996. The album peaked at number seven on the US Top R&B/Hip-Hop Albums chart and reached number 42 on the US Billboard 200. Case was supported by four singles, including "More to Love" and "Touch Me, Tease Me" featuring Foxy Brown and Mary J. Blige which became the album's most successful single on the Billboard Hot 100, peaking at number 14. In a 2020 interview with BET, Case remarked that he disliked recording the album and admitted he did not have a lot of creative freedom within the album.

== Critical reception ==
Professional ratings
Review scores
Source	Rating
AllMusic	4/5 stars

Allmusic editor Leo Stanley found that "on his eponymous debut, Case manages to be tough without sacrificing his soul. Case keeps his hard edge by telling things straight, refusing to embellish his tales with meaningless boasts. [It] would have a stronger punch if the music was a little more forceful and varied, but even so, the record is a refreshing debut — it proves that the genre hasn't exhausted its potential quite yet."

== Commercial performance ==
The album reached number forty-second on the US US Billboard 200 album chart, also reaching the seventh position on the US R&B Albums.

== Track listing ==
No.	Title	Writer(s)	Producer(s)	Length
1.	"The Tunnel" (Interlude)	Keith Evans; Kenny "Smoove" Kornegay	Kornegay	1:22
2.	"More to Love"	Mary J. Blige; James Brown; Antonio Hardy; Kornegay; John Starks; Darryl Young	Kornegay; Young	3:53
3.	"Don't Be Afraid"	Blige; Faith Evans; Kornegay; James Todd Smith; Andy White; Marlon Williams; Young	Kornegay; Young	4:22
4.	"Call a Cab" (Interlude)	Robert Diggs; Misa Hylton; Clifford Smith; Case Woodard	Kornegay	0:58
5.	"I Gotcha"	Blige; LaTonya Blige-DaCosta; Diggs; Kornegay; Corey Woods; Stevie Wonder; Young	Kornegay; Young	4:06
6.	"Crazy" (Interlude)	James "Jimmy" Maynes; Kevin "Big Kev" McDaniel; Woodard	Maynes; McDaniel	0:46
7.	"Crazy"	Maynes; McDaniel; Woodard	Maynes; McDaniel	4:48
8.	"What's Wrong?"	Maynes; McDaniel; Woodard	Maynes; McDaniel	4:22
9.	"Rain" (Interlude)	Joseph "Jo-Jo" Brim; Terence Dudley; Maynes; Woodard	Brim; McDaniel	0:30
10.	"Rain"	Brim; Dudley; Maynes; Woodard	Brim; Dudley; Christopher "Roc Head" Kellam; Damon "D-Mac" Mack	3:55
11.	"Touch Me, Tease Me" (featuring Foxy Brown and Mary J. Blige)	Blige; Kornegay; Inga Marchand; J.B. Weaver, Jr.; Woodard; Young	Kornegay; Young	3:47
12.	"The Day That I Die"	Kornegay; Adams; Woodard; Young	Kornegay; Young	4:04
13.	"Fallin'"	Maynes; McDaniel; Woodard	Maynes; McDaniel	4:40
14.	"Cryin' Over Time"	James Harris III; Terry Lewis	Prince Charles Alexander	5:27

Sample credits

- "More to Love" contains a sample of "The Payback" as performed by James Brown and "Somethin' Funky" by Big Daddy Kane.
- "Don't Be Afraid" contains a sample of "6 Minutes of Pleasure" as performed by LL Cool J.
- "Call a Cab" contains a sample of "Bring the Pain" as performed by Method Man.
- "I Gotcha" contains a sample of "Guillotine (Swordz)" as performed by Raekwon featuring Inspectah Deck, Ghostface and GZA; contains an interpolation of "Mary Jane (All Night Long)" as performed by Mary J. Blige; and a vocal interpolation of "As" as performed by Stevie Wonder.
- "Touch Me, Tease Me" contains a sample of "P.S.K. (What Does It Mean?)" as performed by Schoolly D.

== Charts ==
Chart (1996)	Peak position
US Billboard 200	42
US Top R&B/Hip-Hop Albums (Billboard)	7
