= Touch Me, Tease Me =

- 1999 cover for the UK release

Single by Case featuring Foxy Brown

from the album The Nutty Professor and Case
- Released: April 30, 1996
- Recorded: 1995
- Studio: Quad Studios (New York)
- Genre: R&B; hip hop soul
- Length: 4:31 (explicit version); 3:49 (single version)
- Label: Def Jam
- Songwriters: Mary J. Blige; Kenny Kornegay; Inga Marchand; J.B. Weaver, Jr.; Case Woodard; Darryl Young
- Producers: Kenny "K-Smoove" Kornegay; Darryl "88" Young

Case singles chronology
"More to Love" (1996)	"Touch Me, Tease Me" (1996)	"Don't Be Afraid" (1996)

Foxy Brown singles chronology
"Ain't No Nigga" (1996)	"Touch Me, Tease Me" (1996)	"Get Me Home" (1996)

"Touch Me, Tease Me" is a song by American R&B singer and songwriter Case. It served as the second single from his self-titled debut album (1996). It features vocals from rapper Foxy Brown, with backing vocals by Vernell Foster (later known as Vee of Koffee Brown) and contains a sample of the 1985 song "P.S.K. (What Does It Mean?)" by Schoolly D.

The single was commercially successful, peaking at number 14 on the US Billboard Hot 100, and number 26 on the UK Singles Chart. The song also placed at number 63 on the Billboard Year-End Hot 100 singles of 1996, and was certified gold by the Recording Industry Association of America.

The song also features in the soundtrack to the Eddie Murphy film The Nutty Professor, which scenes are intercut in its music video. Mary J. Blige and Brown make appearances in the video.

== Samples and covers ==
In 1996, hip hop group the LOX freestyled over the instrumental to "Touch Me, Tease Me" on Hot 97.

The song was later covered by Welsh boy band 3SL in 2002 and was more successful than the original version, reaching number 16 on the UK Singles Chart, ten places higher than the original.

In 2009, 50 Cent recorded an abbreviated version titled "Touch Me". In its music video, he is seen wearing the same attire as Case in the original version.

In 2018, King Combs (son of Sean "Diddy" Combs) sampled "Touch Me, Tease Me" for his single "Love You Better" featuring vocals from Chris Brown.

== Charts ==
Chart (1996)	Peak position
UK Singles (OCC)	26
US Billboard Hot 100	14
US Cash Box Top 100	10
