= Soul Survivor (Young Jeezy song) =

Single by Young Jeezy featuring Akon

from the album Let's Get It: Thug Motivation 101
- Released: July 16, 2005
- Studio: Dirty South Studios (Atlanta, Georgia); PatchWerk Recording Studios (Atlanta, Georgia)
- Genre: Trap
- Length: 4:40 (album version); 4:25 (music video version)
- Label: Sho'nuff; Def Jam; Corporate Thugz
- Songwriters: Jay Jenkins; Aliaune Thiam
- Producer: Akon

Young Jeezy singles chronology
| "And Then What" (2005) | "Soul Survivor" (2005) | "Go Crazy (Remix)" (2005) |

Akon singles chronology
| "Belly Dancer (Bananza)" (2005) | "Soul Survivor" (2005) | "Pot of Gold" (2005) |

"Soul Survivor" is the second single of American rapper Young Jeezy, and appears on the 2005 album Let's Get It: Thug Motivation 101. The song features Akon, and was released through Jazze Pha's Sho'nuff Records, Def Jam Recordings and Jeezy's Corporate Thugz Entertainment

This song is later featured on Def Jam: Icon, a 2007 video game for the Xbox 360 and PlayStation 3, a video game Jeezy appears in as himself providing his own voice and likeness and is a playable character. It was also featured on the Bones episode "The Man in the Wall".

== Music video ==
A music video was produced to promote the single. The video was directed by Benny Boom and is heavily inspired by Paid in Full. Beanie Sigel, Cam'ron, Fabolous, DJ Clue, Zab Judah and Big Meech all make cameo appearances.

== Remixes ==
There are several remixes of the song, one features Boyz In Da Hood and Jim Jones, another used the lyrics from Vybz Kartel's "Gun Session" featuring Shabba Ranks, Sizzla, and Akon, a remix features lyrics from Tupac Shakur's "This Life I Lead" and Akon, a remix that features Cam'ron and T.I., and a remix that features Lil Wayne, Mack Maine, Sizzla, 40 Glocc and Boyz In Da Hood. Then two other remixes with one with Cosculluela on his mixtape Antes Del Prrum and the other version with rapper Sinful from his mixtape Behind 16 Bars.

== Charts ==
=== Weekly charts ===
| Chart (2005) | Peak position |
|---|---|
| Canada CHR/Pop Top 30 (Radio & Records) | 20 |
| Germany (GfK) | 74 |
| Ireland (IRMA) | 32 |
| UK Singles (Official Charts) | 16 |
| US Billboard Hot 100 | 4 |
| US Pop Airplay (Billboard) | 10 |
| US Hot R&B/Hip-Hop Songs (Billboard) | 1 |
| US Hot Rap Songs (Billboard) | 1 |
| US Rhythmic Airplay (Billboard) | 2 |

=== Year-end charts ===
| Chart (2005) | position |
|---|---|
| US Billboard Hot 100 | 52 |
| US Hot R&B/Hip-Hop Songs (Billboard) | 27 |
| Chart (2006) | position |
| US Billboard Hot 100 | 88 |
| US Hot R&B/Hip-Hop Songs (Billboard) | 71 |

== Certifications ==
| Region | Certification | Certified units/sales |
|---|---|---|
| New Zealand (RMNZ) | Gold | 15,000^{‡} |
| United States (RIAA) | 4× Platinum | 4,000,000^{‡} |
| United States (RIAA) Mastertone | Platinum | 1,000,000^{*} |
^{*} Sales figures based on certification alone.^{‡} Sales+streaming figures based on certification alone.

== Release history ==
| Region | Date | Format(s) | Label(s) | Ref. |
|---|---|---|---|---|
| United States | August 2, 2005 | Rhythmic contemporary radio | Def Jam, IDJMG | |
| United States | October 11, 2005 | Contemporary hit radio | Def Jam, IDJMG | |
