= Case (singer) =

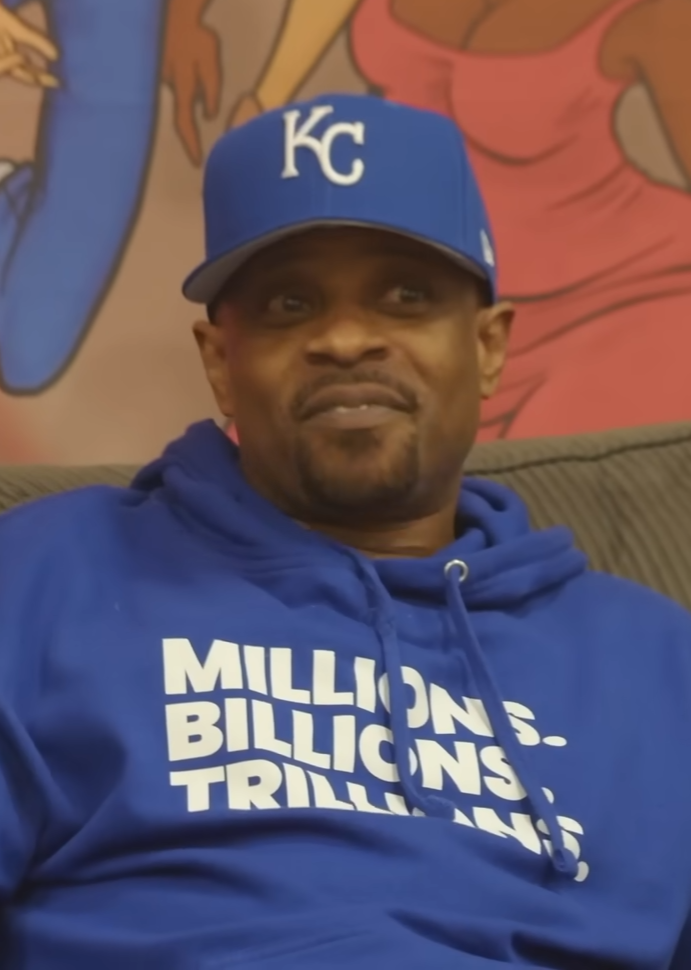
- Case in 2024

Background information
- Origin: New York City, U.S.
- Genres: R&B; hip hop soul; urban
- Occupations: Singer; songwriter; record producer; actor
- Instruments: Vocals; piano
- Years active: 1992–present
- Labels: Def Jam; Def Soul; E1; Indigo Blue; Real Talk; Sire; Spoiled Rotten Music

Case Woodard is an American singer, songwriter, record producer and actor. He is best known for the 1990s hits "Touch Me, Tease Me", "Happily Ever After" and "The Best Man I Can Be" (with Ginuwine, R.L. and Tyrese), as well as the early 2000s hits "Missing You" and "Livin' It Up" with Ja Rule. The latter two earned him two Grammy Award nominations.

== Music career ==
After stints with R&B group 'Future' and a duo called 'Black', Case got work co-writing and singing background for artists including Usher, Christopher Williams and Al B. Sure. Armed with a song written by Faith Evans, Case was discovered by Russell Simmons who signed him to Def Jam Records.

Case's solo career took off in 1996 with the release of "Touch Me, Tease Me" featuring a then up-and-coming rapper Foxy Brown and R&B singer Mary J. Blige from The Nutty Professor soundtrack, going gold and reaching No. 4 on the R&B Songs chart and No. 14 on the U.S. Billboard Hot 100 chart. It also found success across globally, becoming a top 40 hit in the UK, where it reached the twenty-sixth position on the UK Singles Chart. Featuring songwriting and production from the likes of Mary J. Blige, Faith Evans and Case himself, Case's self-titled album was released by Def Jam Records in August 1996. Despite the huge success of "Touch Me, Tease Me", the album performed moderately on the Billboard charts. It peaked at number 42 on the Billboard 200 album chart, and reached the top 7 on the R&B Albums chart as well. In a Finding interview with BET that premiered in January 2020, Case dismissed the album as one of his favorites. He later recounted that bad business deals and inexperience being a new artist at the time, as well as not having as much creative input on the album, caused his overall dislike for the album. It took nearly three years for Case to record a follow-up album.

Case followed the success of his first album with the release of Personal Conversation in April 1999. The album featured the hits "Happily Ever After" (which reached No. 3 on the R&B charts and No. 15 on the Hot 100) and "Faded Pictures", which featured R&B singer Joe and reached No. 3 on the R&B chart and No. 10 on the Hot 100. "Happily Ever After" featured a then 17-year old Beyoncé in the video as Case's love interest. The album's third single, "Think Of You" failed to do well, managing to only reach No. 50 on the R&B chart. Personal Conversation achieved gold status.

In 2001, as the first artist on the new Def Soul imprint, Case released his third album Open Letter and topped the charts with the Tim & Bob produced hit song "Missing You." Open Letter, Case's most well-known album went gold. "Missing You" is Case's only No. 1 single to date as it topped the R&B charts and reached No. 4 on the Billboard Hot 100. Later that year, Case also appeared on rapper Ja Rule's hit "Livin' It Up," as well as releasing one more single from his album, "Not Your Friend." After the success of Open Letter, Case moved to Atlanta to be closer to his children. He earned his first two nominations for Best Male R&B Vocal Performance ("Missing You") and Best Rap/Sung Collaboration ("Livin' It Up") at the 44th Grammy Awards in 2002. He lost both to "U Remind Me" by Usher and "Let Me Blow Ya Mind" by Eve and Gwen Stefani, respectively.

Case's success has been partly due to his appearance on movie soundtracks. Many of Case's most popular tracks appear on the soundtracks for Nutty Professor, Rush Hour, Nutty Professor II: The Klumps and The Best Man. These singles were "Touch Me Tease Me" (Nutty Professor), "Faded Pictures" (Rush Hour), "Best Man I Can Be" (The Best Man) and "Missing You" (Nutty Professor II). Case's single, "Shoulda Known Betta" (featuring Ghostface), reached No. 87 on the R&B chart in 2004. The single appeared on the Johnson Family Vacation soundtrack, and was produced by The Neptunes.

After a few years away from the music industry, Case reappeared in 2008 on the track "Face to Face" (a duet with singer Coko) which was included the soundtrack of Tyler Perry's Meet the Browns.

His fourth studio album, The Rose Experience which had undergone various title changes and a label shift (from Def Jam to his own indie imprint, Indigo Blue) was released on March 24, 2009. It was preceded by a single, "Lovely" which reached No. 72 on the R&B chart.

His fifth studio album Here, My Love was released on June 15, 2010, on Real Talk Entertainment featuring the single "Old Fashion Lovin'" and peaked at No. 58 on the Billboard R&B Albums chart.

In 2014, a Best Of compilation was released through Def Jam Recordings on May 27, 2014. Later this year, he signed with eOne and went to work on his sixth studio album titled Heaven's Door. The first single "Shook Up" was released on January 13, 2015. Heaven's Door was released on March 31, 2015. A compilation EP titled Case: Relocked, Reloaded, Revisited (Re-Recordings) followed in 2016.

The following year, he was profiled in the TVOne series Unsung which followed his career. With the buzz of his episode, he released a Valentine's Day EP titled Love Jones Vol. 1.

In 2018, he signed with X-Ray Records and continued to tour. In August 2018, it was announced his next studio album Therapy will be released on September 7, 2018. It was later pushed back to September 21. The album's first single "Make Love" featuring Teddy Riley and Tank was released on August 30.

== Awards and nominations ==
Grammy Awards

Year	Nominee / work	Award	Result
2002	"Missing You"	Best Male R&B Vocal Performance	Nominated
2002	"Living It Up" (with Ja Rule)	Best Rap/Sung Collaboration	Nominated

== Discography ==
=== Studio albums ===
Year	Title	Chart positions			Certifications
Year	Title	U.S.	U.S. R&B	U.K. R&B	Certifications
1996	Case: Released: August 13, 1996	42	7	18	
1999	Personal Conversation: Released: April 20, 1999	33	5	37	U.S.: Gold
2001	Open Letter: Released: April 24, 2001	5	2	38	U.S.: Gold
2009	The Rose Experience: Released: March 24, 2009	111	22	-	
2010	Here, My Love: Released: June 15, 2010	-	58	-	
2015	Heaven's Door: Released: March 31, 2015	-	19	-	
2018	Therapy: Released: September 21, 2018	-	-	-	

=== Singles ===
Year	Song	U.S. Hot 100	U.S. R&B	Album
1996	"More to Love"	-	36	Case
1996	"Touch Me, Tease Me" (featuring Foxy Brown and Mary J. Blige)	14	4	Case
1998	"Faded Pictures" (with Joe)	10	3	Personal Conversation
1999	"Happily Ever After"	15	3	Personal Conversation
1999	"Think of You"	-	50	Personal Conversation
1999	"The Best Man I Can Be" (with Ginuwine, R.L. and Tyrese)	67	15	The Best Man (soundtrack)
2001	"Missing You"	4	1	Open Letter
2001	"Not Your Friend"	-	65	Open Letter
2004	"Shoulda Known Betta" (featuring Ghostface)	-	87	The Rose Experience
2008	"Lovely"	-	72	The Rose Experience
2015	"Shook Up"	-	-	Heaven's Door
