= Ghetto (Akon song) =

Single by Akon

from the album Trouble
- Released: December 21, 2004
- Recorded: 2003–2004
- Genre: R&B; hip hop soul
- Length: 3:57
- Label: SRC/Universal
- Songwriters: Aliaune "Akon" Thiam, Benny Darius
- Producers: Akon, Benny-D

Akon singles chronology
"Find Us" (2004)	"Ghetto" (2004)	"Baby, I'm Back" (2005)

"Ghetto" is a song by Senegalese-American singer-songwriter Akon from his debut studio album, Trouble. The single was released on December 21, 2004, exclusively in Latin America and certain countries of Europe. The single peaked at #92 on the U.S. Billboard Hot 100. Akon describes the meaning of the song, reflected in the song's lyrics, as "a description of the cycle of poverty experienced by those living in poor, inner-city areas". Additionally, it describes the physical and psychological oppression with which these residents must deal on a regular basis.

== Song information ==
Four official versions of the song exist. The main album version is sung entirely by Akon, and features on all versions of the album. The second version is entitled the "International Remix", which features Dutch artists Ali B and Yes-R, and is listed as the main version of the track on the most prominent single formats. The third version is entitled the "US Remix", and features additional vocals from the late rappers Tupac and The Notorious B.I.G. The "US Remix" version is only on the promotional version (US promo CD single). The fourth version is entitled the "Reggaeton Remix", and features vocals from Tego Calderon. There is also a Spanish version of this song by MC Piri, called "Pueblo Libre".

The song is not available on the iTunes version of the Trouble album.

== Music video ==
The music video for the track was filmed in Irvington, New Jersey, trailer park in New Mexico, and the Navajo Nation reservation in Window Rock, Arizona. The video was directed by Canadian Little X. Two videos for the International and Reggaeton remixes exist, and both appear on the main single format.

== Track listing ==
US promo CD single

1. "Ghetto" - 3:57
2. "Ghetto" (Remix) - 4:27

US 12" vinyl

1. "Ghetto" - 3:57
2. "Ghetto" (Reggaeton Remix) (Feat. Tego Calderón, Ali B & Yes R) - 5:40
3. "Ghetto" (International Remix) (Feat. Ali B & Yes R) - 4:17
4. "Ghetto" (Instrumental) - 3:57

Dutch 3CD single set

- CD1
1. "Ghetto" (International Remix) (Feat. Ali B & Yes R) - 4:17
2. "Ghetto" (Live On The Box, Amsterdam) - 3:46
3. "Ghetto" (International Remix) (Feat. Ali B & Yes R) (Video) - 4:23
- CD2
1. "Ghetto" (International Remix) (Feat. Ali B & Yes R) - 4:17
2. "Lonely" (Live On The Box, Amsterdam) - 3:41
3. "Locked Up" (Live On The Box, Amsterdam) - 2:58
- CD3
1. "Ghetto" (International Remix) (Feat. Ali B & Yes R) - 4:17
2. "Ghetto" (Reggaeton Remix) (Feat. Tego Calderon, Ali B & Yes R) - 5:40
3. "Ghetto" (Reggaeton Remix) (Feat. Tego Calderon, Ali B & Yes R) (Video) - 5:40

== Charts ==
=== Weekly charts ===
Chart (2004–06)	Peak position
Netherlands (Dutch Top 40)	3
Netherlands (Single Top 100)	2
US Billboard Hot 100	92
US Hot R&B/Hip-Hop Songs (Billboard)	53
US Rhythmic Airplay (Billboard)	30

=== Year-end charts ===
Chart (2006)	Position
Netherlands (Dutch Top 40)	39
Netherlands (Single Top 100)	35

== Certifications ==
Certifications for "Ghetto"
Region	Certification	Certified units/sales
New Zealand (RMNZ)	Platinum	30,000^{‡}
^{‡} Sales+streaming figures based on certification alone.

== Release history ==
Region	Date	Format(s)	Label(s)	Ref.
United States	November 1, 2004	Rhythmic contemporary radio	SRC, Universal	
