= Get Throwed =

Single by Bun B featuring Pimp C, Z-Ro, Young Jeezy and Jay-Z

from the album Trill
- Released: October 18, 2005
- Recorded: 2005
- Genre: Hip-hop
- Length: 3:53
- Label: Rap-a-Lot; Asylum; Atlantic
- Songwriters: Bernard Freeman; Chad Butler; Joseph McVey; Jay Jenkins; Shawn Carter; Leroy Williams
- Producer: Mr. Lee

Bun B singles chronology
"Draped Up" (2005)	"Get Throwed" (2005)	"Check on It" (2006)

Young Jeezy singles chronology
"Go Crazy" (2005)	"Get Throwed" (2005)	"My Hood" (2005)

Pimp C singles chronology
"I Miss My Homies" (1997)	"Get Throwed" (2005)	"Knockin' Doorz Down" (2006)

Jay-Z singles chronology
"Go Crazy" (2005)	"Get Throwed" (2005)	"Déjà Vu" (2006)

Z-Ro singles chronology
"Platinum" (2005)	"Get Throwed" (2005)	"Top Notch" (2008)

"Get Throwed" is the third single from Bun B's debut album Trill. It was produced by Mr. Lee, and features Pimp C, Z-Ro, Young Jeezy along with Jay-Z.

The song was the first video Pimp C was featured on since he was released from his prison sentence. In the music video, Jay-Z is absent because of contract restrictions, so Bun B and Pimp C took his place. This is the first time Young Jeezy worked with Pimp C and this is Jay-Z's second time working with UGK, since they worked on "Big Pimpin'".

Canadian rapper Drake sampled this song on his song titled, N 2 Deep, on his sixth studio album Certified Lover Boy. Drake sampled the song again on "Solar Eclipse".

== Charts ==
Chart (2006)	Peak position
US Hot R&B/Hip-Hop Songs (Billboard)	49
US Hot Rap Songs (Billboard)	24
