= Let's Get It: Thug Motivation 101 =

Studio album by Young Jeezy
- Released: July 26, 2005
- Recorded: 2004–2005
- Studios: Dirty South Studios (Atlanta, Georgia); PatchWerk Recording Studios (Atlanta, Georgia); Stankonia Recording Studios (Atlanta, Georgia)
- Genres: Hip-hop; Southern hip-hop; trap
- Length: 77:41
- Labels: Island Def Jam; Def Jam; Corporate Thugz
- Producers: Shakir Stewart (exec.) Antonio "L.A." Reid (exec.); Kevin Lee (exec.); Young Jeezy (also exec.); Kinky B (exec.); Shawty Redd; J.U.S.T.I.C.E. League; Midnight Black; Akon; Lil' C; Jazze Pha; Frank Nitti; Mr. Collipark; Don Cannon; Mannie Fresh; Drumma Boy; Kevin "Khao" Cates; Sanchez

Young Jeezy chronology
Come Shop wit Me (2003)	Let's Get It: Thug Motivation 101 (2005)	Thug Motivation 102: The Inspiration (2006)

Singles from Let's Get It: Thug Motivation 101
- 1. "And Then What" Released: June 7, 2005; 2. "Soul Survivor" Released: July 16, 2005; 3. "Go Crazy" Released: August 16, 2005; 4. "My Hood" Released: December 11, 2005

Let's Get It: Thug Motivation 101 is the commercial debut and overall third studio album by American rapper Young Jeezy. It was released on July 26, 2005, by The Island Def Jam Music Group, Def Jam Recordings, and Young Jeezy's Corporate Thugz Entertainment.

The album was supported by four singles: "And Then What" featuring Mannie Fresh, "Soul Survivor" featuring Akon, "Go Crazy" and "My Hood". The album debuted at number two on the Billboard 200, selling 172,000 copies in the first week. The album was certified double platinum by the Recording Industry Association of America (RIAA).

== Critical reception ==
Professional ratings
Review scores
Source	Rating
AllHipHop	4/5 stars
Allmusic	4/5 stars
Entertainment Weekly	(Favorable)
Pitchfork Media	(7.7/10)
Plugged In (publication)	(average)
Prefix Magazine	(5/10)
RapReviews	(6.5/10)
Robert Christgau	(choice cut)
Rolling Stone	3/5 stars
The Situation	4.5/5 stars

In 2015, hip-hop writer Brooklyn Russell declared the album "trap rap's apotheosis" while observing its impact: "Working with only a handful of Shawty Redd beats and his naturally raspy voice, Atlanta native Young Jeezy would lay down the blueprint for an entire region of rappers—virtually knocking big players like Lil Jon out of commission."

In 2012, Complex called the album one of the classic albums of the last decade.

Robert Christgau gave the album a choice cut rating, only liking "My Hood."

== Commercial performance ==
Let's Get It: Thug Motivation 101 debuted at number two on the US Billboard 200, selling 172,000 copies in the first week. This became Jeezy's first US top-ten debut. In its second week, the album dropped to number four on the chart, selling an additional 85,000 copies. In its third week, the album dropped to number six on the chart, selling 71,000 more copies. In its fourth week, the album dropped to number ten on the chart, selling 61,000 copies. As of October 2009, the album sold 1,933,000 copies in the US. On July 2, 2020, the album was certified double platinum by the Recording Industry Association of America (RIAA) for combined sales and album-equivalent units of over two million units in the United States.

== Track listing ==
No.	Title	Writer(s)	Producer(s)	Length
1.	"Thug Motivation 101"	Jay Jenkins; Demetrius Stewart	Shawty Redd	3:14
2.	"Standing Ovation"	Jenkins; Christopher Gholson	Drumma Boy	4:14
3.	"Gangsta Music"	Jenkins; Stewart	Shawty Redd	4:02
4.	"Let's Get It / Sky's the Limit"	Jenkins; Tracey Sewell	Midnight Black	3:42
5.	"And Then What" (featuring Mannie Fresh)	Jenkins; Byron Thomas	Mannie Fresh	4:05
6.	"Go Crazy" (featuring Jay-Z)	Jenkins; Donald Cannon	Don Cannon	4:13
7.	"Last of a Dying Breed" (featuring Trick Daddy, Young Buck and Lil' Will)	Jenkins; Kevin Cates; Marquinarius Holmes; Maurice Young; David Brown	Kevin "Khao" Cates; Sanchez	3:56
8.	"My Hood"	Jenkins; Cordale Quinn	Lil' C	4:00
9.	"Bottom of the Map"	Jenkins; Stewart	Shawty Redd	4:21
10.	"Get Ya Mind Right"	Jenkins; Stewart	Shawty Redd	3:41
11.	"Trap Star"	Jenkins; Michael Crooms	Mr. Collipark	3:52
12.	"Bang" (featuring T.I. and Lil Scrappy)	Jenkins; Phalon Alexander; Clifford Harris, Jr.; Darryl Richardson II	Jazze Pha	4:28
13.	"Don't Get Caught"	Jenkins; Erik Ortiz; Kenny Bartolomei; Kevin Crowe	J.U.S.T.I.C.E. League	4:17
14.	"Soul Survivor" (featuring Akon)	Jenkins; Aliaune Thiam	Akon	4:40
15.	"Trap or Die" (featuring Bun B)	Jenkins; Stewart; Bernard Freeman	Shawty Redd	4:00
16.	"Tear It Up" (featuring Lloyd and Slick Pulla)	Jenkins; Sewell; Lloyd Polite, Jr.; Renaldo Whitman	Midnight Black	4:29
17.	"That's How Ya Feel"	Jenkins; Stewart	Shawty Redd	4:03
18.	"Talk to 'Em"	Jenkins; Chadron Moore	Frank Nitti	4:23
19.	"Air Forces"	Jenkins; Stewart	Shawty Redd	4:01

Leftover tracks

- "Over Here" (featuring Bun B)
- "Hold Up"

Sample credits

- "Go Crazy" contains a sample of "(Man, Oh Man) I Want to Go Back" performed by Curtis Mayfield & The Impressions.
- "My Hood" contains an interpolation of "Rubberband Man" performed by T.I.
- "Talk to 'Em" contains a sample of "I Need You" performed by Frankie Beverly & Maze.
- "Air Forces" contains a sample of "Heroes" performed by Camel.

== Charts ==
=== Weekly charts ===
Chart (2005)	Peak position
US Billboard 200	2
US Top R&B/Hip-Hop Albums (Billboard)	1
US Top Rap Albums (Billboard)	1

=== Year-end charts ===
Chart (2005)	Position
US Billboard 200	55
US Top R&B/Hip-Hop Albums (Billboard)	15

== Certifications ==
Region	Certification	Certified units/sales
United States (RIAA)	3× Platinum	3,000,000^{‡}
^{‡} Sales+streaming figures based on certification alone.
