= Belly Dancer (Bananza) =

2005 single by Akon

Single by Akon

from the album Trouble
- B-side: "Trouble Nobody"
- Released: June 27, 2005
- Genre: R&B
- Length: 4:00
- Label: SRC; Universal
- Songwriters: Lynval Golding; Terence Hall; Neville Staples; Aliaune Thiam
- Producer: Aliaune "Akon" Thiam

Akon singles chronology
"Moonshine" (2005)	"Belly Dancer (Bananza)" (2005)	"Soul Survivor" (2005)

Music video
- "Bananza (Belly Dancer)" on YouTube

"Belly Dancer (Bananza)" (formatted on the album as "Bananza (Belly Dancer)") is a song by Senegalese-American singer-songwriter Akon from his debut studio album, Trouble. "Belly Dancer (Bananza)" peaked at number 30 on the Billboard Hot 100. Outside of the United States, "Belly Dancer (Bananza)" peaked within the top ten of the charts in the United Kingdom. The song samples "The Lunatics (Have Taken Over the Asylum)" by Fun Boy Three and "Body Rock" by Treacherous Three, and borrows from the chorus of "For What It's Worth" by Buffalo Springfield. It was used in the 2009 teen comedy film Fired Up!. A remix of the track, featuring Kardinal Offishall, was later included as a B-side to "Pot of Gold".

== Music video ==
In the televised video, Akon goes into a motorbike store and begins daydreaming. He then encounters a pretty girl and follows her into a belly dancing club. There, as the song said, he finds ex-gangsters, and they all flirt. Towards the end of the video, Akon kisses his chosen girl. The online version of the video begins with Akon trying to fall asleep, and awakening upon the video's end. A further version of the video, featuring the remix featuring Kardinal Offshall, was also created.

== Track listings ==
US 12-inch single

A1. "Belly Dancer (Bananza)" (clean) – 4:00
A2. "Belly Dancer (Bananza)" (dirty) – 4:00
A3. "Belly Dancer (Bananza)" (instrumental) – 4:00
B1. "Trouble Nobody" (clean) – 3:22
B2. "Trouble Nobody" (dirty) – 3:23
B3. "Trouble Nobody" (instrumental) – 3:23

UK CD1

1. "Belly Dancer (Bananza)"
2. "Trouble Nobody" (album version explicit)

UK CD2

1. "Belly Dancer (Bananza)" (explicit)
2. "Trouble Nobody" (album version explicit)
3. "Belly Dancer (Bananza)" (instrumental)
4. "Belly Dancer (Bananza)" (video)

UK 12-inch single

A1. "Belly Dancer (Bananza)" (explicit) – 4:00
B1. "Belly Dancer (Bananza)" (instrumental) – 4:00
B2. "Belly Dancer (Bananza)" (a cappella) – 3:55

European CD single

1. "Belly Dancer (Bananza)" (radio edit) – 3:12
2. "Trouble Nobody" (album version) – 3:23

Australian CD single

1. "Belly Dancer (Bananza)" (album version)
2. "Trouble Nobody" (album version)
3. "Belly Dancer (Bananza)" (instrumental)
4. "Belly Dancer (Bananza)" (video)

== Charts ==
=== Weekly charts ===
Weekly chart performance for "Belly Dancer (Bananza)"
Chart (2005–2006)	Peak position
Australia (ARIA)	23
Australian Urban (ARIA)	9
Austria (Ö3 Austria Top 40)	54
Belgium (Ultratop 50 Flanders)	29
Belgium (Ultratop 50 Wallonia)	27
Canada CHR/Pop Top 30 (Radio & Records)	23
Czech Republic Airplay (ČNS IFPI)	19
European Hot 100 Singles (Billboard)	21
France (SNEP)	45
Germany (GfK)	32
Hungary (Dance Top 40)	19
Ireland (IRMA)	11
Netherlands (Dutch Top 40 Tipparade)	3
Netherlands (Single Top 100)	46
New Zealand (Recorded Music NZ)	12
Russia Airplay (TopHit)	6
Scotland Singles (OCC)	5
Switzerland (Schweizer Hitparade)	40
UK Singles (OCC)	5
UK Hip Hop/R&B (OCC)	1
US Billboard Hot 100	30
US Pop Airplay (Billboard)	17
US Rhythmic Airplay (Billboard)	39

=== Year-end charts ===
2005 year-end chart performance for "Belly Dancer (Bananza)"
Chart (2005)	Position
Russia Airplay (TopHit)	120
UK Urban (Music Week) with "Trouble Nobody"	25
US Mainstream Top 40 (Billboard)	73

2006 year-end chart performance for "Belly Dancer (Bananza)"
Chart (2006)	Position
Russia Airplay (TopHit)	96

== Certifications ==
Certifications for "Belly Dancer (Bananza)"
Region	Certification	Certified units/sales
New Zealand (RMNZ)	Platinum	30,000^{‡}
United Kingdom (BPI)	Silver	200,000^{‡}
United States (RIAA)	Platinum	1,000,000^{‡}
^{‡} Sales+streaming figures based on certification alone.

== Release history ==
Release dates and formats for "Belly Dancer (Bananza)"
Region	Date	Format(s)	Label(s)	Ref.
United States	June 27, 2005	Contemporary hit radio	SRC; Universal	
United Kingdom	August 8, 2005	CD	SRC; Universal	
Australia	October 3, 2005	CD	SRC; Universal	

== Imanbek and Byor version ==
"Belly Dancer"

Single by Imanbek and Byor
- Released: 18 February 2022
- Length: 2:31
- Label: Spinnin'; Musical Freedom; Effective
- Songwriters: Aliaune Akon Thiam; Lynval Golding; Terence Hall; Neville Staples
- Producers: Imanbek; BYOR

Imanbek singles chronology
"Ordinary Life" (2022)	"Belly Dancer" (2022)	"Ocean of Tears" (2022)

Music video
- "Belly Dancer" on YouTube

In 2022, Kazakh DJ and producer Imanbek and Russian DJ Byor released a remix version of the song, which charted in several European countries.

=== Charts ===
==== Weekly charts ====
Weekly chart performance for "Belly Dancer"
Chart (2022–2023)	Peak position
Austria (Ö3 Austria Top 40)	14
Belgium (Ultratop 50 Flanders)	18
Belgium (Ultratop 50 Wallonia)	5
Canada (Canadian Hot 100)	58
Canada CHR/Top 40 (Billboard)	43
Czech Republic Airplay (ČNS IFPI)	37
Czech Republic Singles Digital (ČNS IFPI)	42
Denmark (Tracklisten)	26
Finland (Suomen virallinen lista)	13
France (SNEP)	16
Germany (GfK)	7
Germany Airplay (BVMI)	6
Global 200 (Billboard)	132
Greece International (IFPI)	41
Hungary (Rádiós Top 40)	3
Hungary (Dance Top 40)	3
Hungary (Single Top 40)	6
Hungary (Stream Top 40)	36
Ireland (IRMA)	96
Lithuania (AGATA)	64
Netherlands (Dutch Top 40)	12
Netherlands (Single Top 100)	12
Norway (VG-lista)	37
Poland Airplay (ZPAV)	2
Poland (Polish Streaming Top 100)	80
Russia Airplay (TopHit)	29
Slovakia Airplay (ČNS IFPI)	7
Slovakia Singles Digital (ČNS IFPI)	24
Sweden (Sverigetopplistan)	92
Switzerland (Schweizer Hitparade)	16
UK Indie (OCC)	49
US Hot Dance/Electronic Songs (Billboard)	25

==== Year-end charts ====
2022 year-end chart performance for "Belly Dancer"
Chart (2022)	Position
Austria (Ö3 Austria Top 40)	43
Belgium (Ultratop 50 Flanders)	70
Belgium (Ultratop 50 Wallonia)	27
Denmark (Tracklisten)	77
Germany (Official German Charts)	24
Global Excl. US (Billboard)	165
Hungary (Dance Top 40)	19
Hungary (Rádiós Top 40)	32
Hungary (Single Top 40)	32
Netherlands (Dutch Top 40)	66
Netherlands (Single Top 100)	38
Poland (ZPAV)	59
Switzerland (Schweizer Hitparade)	37
US Hot Dance/Electronic Songs (Billboard)	73

2023 year-end chart performance for "Belly Dancer"
Chart (2023)	Position
Austria (Ö3 Austria Top 40)	67
Germany (Official German Charts)	64
Hungary (Dance Top 40)	5
Hungary (Rádiós Top 40)	25
Switzerland (Schweizer Hitparade)	94

2024 year-end chart performance for "Belly Dancer"
Chart (2024)	Position
Belarus Airplay (TopHit)	110
Hungary (Dance Top 40)	52

2025 year-end chart performance for "Belly Dancer"
Chart (2025)	Position
Hungary (Rádiós Top 40)	68

=== Certifications ===
Certifications for "Belly Dancer"
Region	Certification	Certified units/sales
Austria (IFPI Austria)	2× Platinum	60,000^{‡}
Denmark (IFPI Danmark)	Platinum	90,000^{‡}
France (SNEP)	Diamond	333,333^{‡}
Germany (BVMI)	Platinum	400,000^{‡}
Italy (FIMI)	Platinum	100,000^{‡}
New Zealand (RMNZ)	Gold	15,000^{‡}
Poland (ZPAV)	3× Platinum	150,000^{‡}
Spain (Promusicae)	Gold	30,000^{‡}
United Kingdom (BPI)	Silver	200,000^{‡}
United States (RIAA)	Gold	500,000^{‡}
^{‡} Sales+streaming figures based on certification alone.
