= Joie Manda =

American music executive

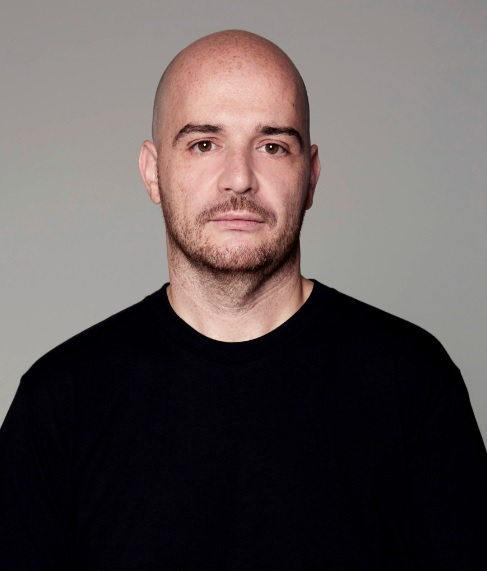
- Born: Brooklyn, New York
- Occupation: Music executive
- Years active: 2004–present
- Website: JoieManda.com

Joie Manda is an American music executive and the Founder & CEO of Encore Recordings and Platinum Grammar. He previously held executive positions with Interscope Geffen A&M Records, Def Jam Recordings, Warner Music Group, Universal Music Group, and Asylum Records.

== Early life ==
Manda grew up in the Gravesend, neighborhood of Brooklyn, New York. When he was around 12 or 13, he showed an interest in music and his mother purchased him a set of turntables. Manda dropped out of high school when he was in 11th grade, and soon earned jobs as a doorman and promoter. In the 1990s, he started working for Peter Gatien, a nightclub owner who owned several clubs throughout the New York City area, including Tunnel, The Limelight, and Palladium.

== Career ==
While working as a promoter at the Palladium, Manda met DJ, Funkmaster Flex and became an associate executive producer on Flex and DJ Big Kap's 1999 album, The Tunnel (named after Gatien's nightclub). He also worked on a second Funkmaster Flex album and briefly worked as a consultant for that label.

In 2004, Manda became the executive vice president and head of A&R at Asylum Records. He later became EVP at Warner Bros. Records in 2010. In March 2012, Manda was appointed president of Def Jam Recordings, becoming the first person to fill the role since Jay-Z vacated it in 2007. Soon after leaving Def Jam, he joined Interscope Records in 2013 and in May 2017, Manda was named the executive vice president of Interscope. In December 2020, Manda announced he would be leaving Interscope Geffen A&M & Universal Music group after working there for eight years. In November 2021, Manda announced the launch of his new company, Encore Recordings, an independent, full service music company. In 2022 he launched Platinum Grammar, an independent publishing company.
