= Trouble (Akon album) =

Studio album by Akon
- Released: June 29, 2004
- Recorded: September 2003 – March 2004
- Studios: White Room Studio, Detroit, Michigan
- Genre: R&B
- Length: 42:28
- Labels: UpFront; SRC; Universal
- Producers: Akon; Benny-D; Knobody; Shakim Williams; Disco D

Akon chronology
Trouble (2004)	Konvicted (2006)

Singles from Trouble
- 1. "Locked Up" Released: April 5, 2004; 2. "Ghetto" Released: December 21, 2004; 3. "Lonely" Released: February 22, 2005; 4. "Belly Dancer (Bananza)" Released: June 27, 2005; 5. "Pot of Gold" Released: November 15, 2005

Trouble is the debut studio album by Senegalese-American singer-songwriter Akon, released on June 29, 2004, by UpFront Megatainment, SRC Records and Universal Records. The album contains Akon's worldwide hit single, "Lonely", which was his commercial breakthrough. However, the release of "Locked Up" propelled Akon to sign a record deal. "Gunshot (Fiesta Riddim)" was released as promotional single on May 11, 2004. The album achieved significant success in the United Kingdom, topping the UK Albums Chart. Trouble sold 25,000 copies in its first week and was later certified double platinum by the RIAA in the United States, with overall sales reaching 1.6 million copies.

== Background ==
Although "Lonely" offered the album's best option in terms of commercial breakthrough, SRC Records A&R Jerome Foster told HitQuarters that "Locked Up" was chosen because he wanted to break Akon in the streets first and work towards a cross-over. "Locked Up" is a street record. I thought that was the place for us to start to get a fan-base, knowing that we had a record like "Lonely", which was more commercial, to follow it." The final appearance on the Billboard 200 was for the chart dated November 26, 2005. The album first appeared on the UK Album Chart on February 12, 2005. It slowly climbed up the chart before finally reaching the summit on April 30, 2005. It then spent two non-consecutive weeks at #1 on the UK Album Chart. Trouble is by far Akon's most successful album in the United Kingdom to date.

== Release ==
When originally released in 2004, the UK version of the album contained 13 tracks, whilst US versions of the album only contained 12, omitting the song "Ghetto". The digital version of the US album includes the bonus track "Kill The Dance". In 2005, the UK version of the album was re-issued with additional bonus tracks "Gunshot" and a remix of "Locked Up". In Japan, the bonus tracks were the same; however, the track "Ghetto" was once again omitted. For its release across Europe in late 2004, the album was completely altered, with remixes of "Belly Dancer", "Lonely" and "Don't Let Up" replacing the original versions, issued in the US and UK. The European version also removes the track "I Won't" and replaces it with a brand new track, "Easy Road". In 2005, the album was reissued, this time with a bonus disc containing two brand new tracks, two remixes and six collaborations between Akon and other artists. In Europe, the bonus disc contained 11 tracks, adding another remix of "Ghetto" as track one. In 2006, all US versions of the album were removed from iTunes, replacing them with the European version. However, the European edition loses the track "Easy Road" and replaces it with the original track "I Won't", and also includes the US digital bonus track "Kill The Dance", instead of the remix of "Locked Up".

== Critical reception ==
Professional ratings
Review scores
Source	Rating
AllMusic	2.5/5 stars
Christgau's Consumer Guide	(3-star Honorable Mention)
RapReviews	6.5/10
Spin	A−
Sputnikmusic	3/5

New York Times critic Kelefa Sanneh called Trouble a "surprisingly strong debut album. Working in the tradition pioneered by R. Kelly, Akon moves deftly from hard-knock stories to dance-floor sleaze to inspirational ballads; the verses are full of nimble sing-rapping and the choruses are often simple and incantatory, with Akon multitracking his voice to sing his own backing vocals." Azeem Ahmad, writing for musicOMH, felt that Trouble stood out from typical "street-to-success" rap stories. He praised highlights such as like "Locked Up", "Trouble Nobody" and "When the Time's Right" for their emotion and strong beats and concluded that Akon's distinctive, "almost tribal" vocals made Trouble both intense and easy to listen to.

AllMusic editor Andy Kellman wrote that on Trouble, "unfortunately, no other song" comes close to being as gripping as "Locked Up." He noted that the club-oriented tracks fall "flat, most of the soul-searching moments feel forced, and the harder and more sexual tracks tend to be more silly than alluring. At its best, Trouble places you in Akon's turbulent world. At its worst, which is often, the album is excessively tedious." Hot Press editor Colm O'Hare felt thath Trouble sounded like many other hip-hop/R&B records. He admitted Akon "hadn't a bad voice," but argued that the themes and titles such as "Gangsta", "Ghetto", and "Gunshot" were "clichéd in the extreme."

== Commercial performance ==
The album performed well in the United Kingdom where it peaked at No. 1 on the UK Album Chart. Trouble sold 25,000 copies in the first week, and certified 2× Platinum by the RIAA in the United States and has sold 1.6 million copies.

== Track listing ==
Standard edition
No.	Title	Writer(s)	Producer(s)	Length
1.	"Locked Up"	Aliaune Thiam	Akon	3:56
2.	"Trouble Nobody"	Thiam; Dwight Grant; Ricardo Thomas	Akon	3:23
3.	"Bananza (Belly Dancer)"	Thiam; Lynval Golding; Terence Hall; Neville Staples	Akon	4:00
4.	"Gangsta" (featuring Daddy T, Picklehead and Devyne)	Thiam; Torrey Pettigrew; Jonathan Mann; Darrick Stephens	Akon	4:15
5.	"Ghetto"	Thiam; Benny Darius	Akon; Benny-D	3:55
6.	"Pot of Gold"	Thiam; Shakim Williams	Akon; Shakim Williams	3:36
7.	"Show Out"	Thiam	Akon	3:25
8.	"Lonely"	Thiam; Bobby Vinton; Gene Allan	Akon; Disco D	3:57
9.	"When the Time's Right"	Thiam	Akon	3:44
10.	"Journey"	Thiam, Lawson	Akon	4:18
11.	"Don't Let Up"	Thiam; Bryan Boylai	Akon; Benny D	4:04
Total length:				42:33

European edition bonus tracks
No.	Title	Writer(s)	Producer(s)	Length
12.	"I Won't"	Thiam; Shawn Williams	Akon	3:16
13.	"Locked Up" (Remix) (featuring Styles P)	Thiam; David Styles	Akon; Knobody	3:50

German edition bonus tracks
No.	Title	Writer(s)	Producer(s)	Length
14.	"Locked Up" (remix; featuring Azad)	Thiam; Styles; Azad Azadpour	Akon; Knobody	3:42
Total length:				54:21

British/Japanese edition bonus tracks
No.	Title	Writer(s)	Producer(s)	Length
14.	"Gunshot"	Thiam; Dave Kelly	Akon	2:56
15.	"Locked Up" (remix; featuring Styles P and Taz)	Thiam; Styles	Akon; Knobody	3:48

French edition bonus tracks
No.	Title	Writer(s)	Producer(s)	Length
13.	"Locked Up" (remix; featuring Booba)	Thiam; David Styles; Elie Yaffa	Akon; Knobody	4:24
Total length:				54:21

iTunes Store edition bonus tracks
No.	Title	Writer(s)	Producer(s)	Length
13.	"Kill the Dance (Got Something for Ya)" (featuring Kardinal Offishall)	Thiam; Jason Harrow; Dwayne Chin-Quee	Akon; Supa-Dups	2:58

AlbumHunt special edition bonus tracks
No.	Title	Writer(s)	Producer(s)	Length
12.	"A.T.L. to L.A. to N.Y.C." (featuring G-Unit and The Game)	Thiam; Curtis Jackson; Tony Yayo; Lloyd Banks; Jayceon Taylor	Akon	3:17
13.	"Pot of Gold" (remix)	Thiam; Shakim Allah	Akon; Shakim Williams	3:52
14.	"Show Out" (remix; featuring Dru Hill)	Thiam; Mark Andrews; Larry Anthony; Tamir Ruffin; James Green	Akon	3:12
15.	"Ghetto" (remix; featuring Ali-B and Yes-R)	Thiam; Darius	Akon; Benny-D	3:57
16.	"Gunshot"	Thiam; Dave Kelly	Akon	2:56
17.	"Locked Up" (remix; featuring Styles P)	Thiam; David Styles	Akon; Knobody	3:50
18.	"I Won't"	Thiam	Akon	3:16

American edition bonus tracks
No.	Title	Writer(s)	Producer(s)	Length
12.	"Easy Road"	Thiam; Shakim Allah	Akon; Shakim Williams	3:22
13.	"Locked Up" (remix; featuring Styles P)	Thiam; David Styles	Akon; Knobody	3:50
Total length:				49:57

European enhanced edition bonus tracks
No.	Title	Writer(s)	Producer(s)	Length
12.	"Easy Road"	Thiam; Shakim Allah	Akon; Shakim Williams	3:22
13.	"Locked Up" (featuring Styles P)	Thiam; David Styles	Akon; Knobody	3:50
14.	"Locked Up" (remix; featuring Booba)	Thiam; Styles; Elie Yaffa	Akon; Knobody	3:42
15.	"Locked Up" (music video)
16.	"Ghetto" (music video)
17.	"Lonely" (music video)

Deluxe edition
No.	Title	Writer(s)	Producer(s)	Length
1.	"Bananza (Belly Dancer)" (remix; featuring Kardinal Offishall)	Aliaune Thiam; Jason Harrow	Akon	3:28
2.	"Gunshot"	Thiam; Dave Kelly	Akon	2:56
3.	"Senegal"	Thiam; Anthony Hamilton; Mark Batson	Akon	2:53
4.	"Keep on Callin'" (P-Money featuring Akon)	Thiam; Peter Waddams	Akon; P-Money	3:34
5.	"Never Gonna Get It" (Sean Biggs featuring Akon)	Thiam; Ron Feemster; Sean Biggs	Akon; Feemster	3:37
6.	"Miss Melody" (Miri Ben-Ari featuring Akon)	Thiam; Miri Ben-Ari	Akon; Ben-Ari	3:50
7.	"Kill the Dance (Got Something for Ya)" (featuring Kardinal Offishall)	Thiam; Harrow; Dwayne Quin-Chee	Akon; Supa-Dups	2:58
8.	"Find Us (In the Back of the Club)" (The Beatnuts featuring Akon)	Thiam; Jerry Tineo; Lester Fernandez	Akon; The Beatnuts	3:15
9.	"Baby, I'm Back" (Baby Bash featuring Akon)	Thiam; Ron Bryant; Taylor Dow	Akon; Bryan Stanley	3:48
10.	"Yey" (Grady Babyz featuring Akon)	Thiam; Torrey Pettigrew; Jonathan Mann	Akon	4:32

Netherlands edition bonus track
No.	Title	Writer(s)	Producer(s)	Length
11.	"Ghetto" (remix; featuring Ali-B and Yes-R)	Thiam; Benny Darius	Akon; Benny-D	3:57

Sample credits

- "Trouble Nobody" contains interpolations from "I Don't Do Much", written by Dwight Grant and Ricardo Thomas.
- "Bananza (Belly Dancer)" contains samples from "The Lunatics (Have Taken Over the Asylum)", written by Lynval Golding, Terence Hall, and Neville Staples; performed by Fun Boy Three.
- "Lonely" contains samples from "Mr. Lonely", written by Bobby Vinton and Gene Allan; performed by Bobby Vinton.

== Charts ==
=== Weekly charts ===
Weekly chart performance for Trouble
Chart (2004–05)	Peak position
Australian Albums (ARIA)	12
Australian Urban Albums (ARIA)	4
Austrian Albums (Ö3 Austria)	32
Belgian Albums (Ultratop Flanders)	54
Belgian Albums (Ultratop Wallonia)	34
Canadian R&B Albums (Nielsen SoundScan)	28
Danish Albums (Hitlisten)	5
Dutch Albums (Album Top 100)	36
French Albums (SNEP)	11
German Albums (Offizielle Top 100)	24
Irish Albums (IRMA)	3
Japanese Albums (Oricon)	41
New Zealand Albums (RMNZ)	2
Norwegian Albums (VG-lista)	6
Scottish Albums (Official Charts)	3
Swedish Albums (Sverigetopplistan)	49
Swiss Albums (Schweizer Hitparade)	31
UK Albums (Official Charts)	1
UK R&B Albums (Official Charts)	1
US Billboard 200	18
US Top R&B/Hip-Hop Albums (Billboard)	11

=== Year-end charts ===
2004 year-end chart performance for Trouble
Chart (2004)	Position
US Billboard 200	192
US Top R&B/Hip-Hop Albums (Billboard)	67
Worldwide Albums (IFPI)	44

2005 year-end chart performance for Trouble
Chart (2005)	Position
Australian Albums (ARIA)	90
French Albums (SNEP)	64
New Zealand Albums (RMNZ)	15
UK Albums (OCC)	33
US Billboard 200	66
US Top R&B/Hip-Hop Albums (Billboard)	41

== Certifications ==
Certifications and sales for Trouble
Region	Certification	Certified units/sales
Australia (ARIA)	Gold	35,000^{^}
Brazil (Pro-Música Brasil) (20th Anniversary Edition)	Platinum	40,000^{‡}
Canada (Music Canada)	Gold	50,000^{^}
Denmark (IFPI Danmark)	Platinum	20,000^{‡}
France (SNEP)	Gold	100,000^{*}
New Zealand (RMNZ)	4× Platinum	60,000^{‡}
United Kingdom (BPI)	2× Platinum	600,000^{‡}
United States (RIAA)	2× Platinum	2,000,000^{‡}
^{*} Sales figures based on certification alone.^{^} Shipments figures based on certification alone.^{‡} Sales+streaming figures based on certification alone.
