= Def Jam Recordings =

American record label

- Parent company: Universal Music Group (1998–present); Previously: CBS Records Group (1984–1991); Sony Music Entertainment, Inc. (1991–1994); PolyGram (1994–1998)
- Founded: 1984; 42 years ago
- Founder: Rick Rubin; Russell Simmons
- Genre: Various, predominantly on hip-hop and R&B
- Country of origin: United States
- Location: New York City, New York, U.S.
- Official website: defjam.com

Def Jam Recordings (also simply known as Def Jam or Def Jam Records) is an American multinational record label owned by Universal Music Group. It is based in Manhattan, New York City, specializing predominantly in hip-hop, contemporary R&B, soul and pop.

The label has a London-based, UK arm known as 0207 Def Jam (formerly Def Jam UK in the 1990s until the mid-2000s) and is currently operated through Polydor Records. It has a Johannesburg, South Africa and Lagos, Nigeria-based arm known as Def Jam Africa.

== Company history ==
=== Founding and CBS Records Group era (1983–1994) ===
Def Jam was co-founded by Rick Rubin in his dormitory in Weinstein Hall at New York University, and its first release was a single by his punk-rock group Hose. Russell Simmons joined Rubin shortly after they were introduced to each other, according to one story, by Vincent Gallo. Another cites DJ Jazzy Jay as their connector. Rubin has said he met Simmons on the TV show Graffiti Rock and recognized him then as "the face of hip hop": "He was five years older than me, and he was already established in the music business. And I had no experience whatsoever." The second single released with the Def Jam Recordings logo was T La Rock & Jazzy Jay's "It's Yours". The first releases with Def Jam Recordings catalog numbers were LL Cool J's "I Need a Beat" and the Beastie Boys' "Rock Hard", both in 1984. The singles sold well, eventually leading to a distribution deal with CBS Records through Columbia Records the following year. However, the Hose and T La Rock releases were not part of the deal and are now controlled by different entities.

This created a short-lived subsidiary label called OBR Records, short for Original Black Recordings, which catered toward R&B artists—the first artist signed to that imprint was Oran "Juice" Jones, who enjoyed success with his hit single "The Rain". A few years later, Russell Simmons and Lyor Cohen started an umbrella label called Rush Associated Labels to handle Def Jam and its numerous spinoff labels. RAL became the home to Nice & Smooth and EPMD after both acts were acquired due to the folding of their former label Sleeping Bag Records. Other acts under the RAL umbrella included Redman, Onyx, Flatlinerz, Domino, Warren G and Jayo Felony. Def Jam also signed its first and only thrash metal band, Slayer, in 1986, and the band's third and fourth albums were the only two Def Jam releases to be distributed through Geffen Records via Warner Bros. Records as opposed to Columbia/CBS. As the decade drew to a close, the label signed Public Enemy, whose controversial lyrical content garnered the company both critical acclaim and disdain. Lyor Cohen became president of Def Jam/RAL in 1988, after winning a power struggle with Rubin, who would shortly thereafter leave the company to form Def American Recordings. Rubin would take Slayer and the rights of its Def Jam albums with him to Def American in its initial stages.

In 1991, CBS Records was folded (or rather rebranded) to the music division of Japanese electronic giant Sony, bringing Def Jam and Columbia with it. By 1992, despite recent multiple platinum selling releases from Public Enemy, and EPMD, Def Jam ran into major financial troubles and was faced with folding while at Sony. That year, Kevin Liles was hired as an intern.

=== PolyGram era (1994–1998) ===
In 1994, PolyGram purchased Sony's 50% stake in Def Jam Recordings—subsequently bringing the label into the Island Records fold. Island would share in sales and marketing duties with select radio projects while Def Jam remained independent on all other label functions (A&R, video, promotion and publicity). The label venture went on to receive huge success with a slew of various other multi-platinum releases from Montell Jordan, Public Enemy, LL Cool J, Redman, Method Man and more. RAL/Def Jam also distributed the Violator Records-signed artist Warren G's debut album, Regulate... G Funk Era, which went triple platinum and brought much-needed revenue to Def Jam through its joint deal with Violator.

PolyGram acquired an additional 10% stake in Def Jam, further strengthening its ownership of the label. Shortly thereafter, Rush Associated Labels were renamed to the Def Jam Music Group. The label remained profitable as its veteran star LL Cool J released his successful album Mr. Smith in 1995, a return to the rapper's original credibility following the fallback of his 1993 album, 14 Shots to the Dome; his last album under the Def Jam/Columbia partnership. The label later signed Foxy Brown, whose debut album, Ill Na Na (1996) became a platinum seller in 1997. Def Jam followed up with its then-new R&B act, Case, whose single "Touch Me, Tease Me" (also featured on his self-titled debut album in 1996) was certified gold by the Recording Industry Association of America on June 28, 1996.

In June 1997, Def Jam acquired 50% of rapper Jay-Z's Roc-A-Fella Records for an estimated $1.4 million, giving founders Jay-Z and Damon Dash part ownership of the label, while Def Jam maintained distribution and co-marketing. That same year, through Def Jam A&R Irv Gotti, Def Jam signed artist DMX.

DMX's first studio album, It's Dark and Hell is Hot was released on May 12, 1998, and was co-executive produced by Irv Gotti. The album debuted at number one on the Billboard 200 and sold over 250,000 copies in its first week. The album went on to sell four million copies in America, being certified quadruple platinum by the RIAA, and sold five million copies worldwide. On December 15, 1998, Def Jam released DJ Clue's debut album, The Professional, which saw guest appearances from Def Jam artists Jay-Z, Memphis Bleek, DMX, Redman, Ja Rule, and an appearance from later Def Jam artist Cam'ron. The album was certified platinum by the RIAA. The success of It's Dark and Hell is Hot prompted Lyor Cohen to challenge DMX to record another album quickly to have another album released within the same calendar year. Def Jam closed out 1998 with DMX's second studio album, Flesh of My Flesh, Blood of My Blood, released on December 22, 1998. The album debuted at number one the Billboard 200 with over 670,000 units in its first week of release, and went on to sell over four million copies worldwide. DMX claimed that Def Jam made $144 million from the sales of his first two albums.

=== The Island Def Jam Music Group founding (1998–2000) ===
In 1998, PolyGram was purchased by Universal Pictures' former parent, Seagram. It later merged with the MCA group of record labels. In early 1999, the label group was rebranded as the Universal Music Group. It then purchased the remaining 40% of Def Jam from Russell Simmons for a reported $100 million. Universal Music Group combined Mercury with Island and Def Jam to form a new East Coast unit that became the Island Def Jam Music Group, with Def Jam intended as the unit's black music arm. The Def Jam, Island, and Mercury labels continued as distinct brands within that group.

Lyor Cohen was appointed co-president of IDJMG, and Kevin Liles succeeded him as president of Def Jam. In 1998, Def Jam created an R&B spin-off label called Def Soul Records to run under the label's companionship. Def Jam inherited many of Island's urban artists, including Dru Hill (including its lead singer Sisqó), the Isley Brothers (featuring Ronald Isley) and Kelly Price. Def Soul also issued recordings by Musiq Soulchild, Montell Jordan, Case, 112, Patti LaBelle, and Christina Milian. Liles also assumed presidency of Def Soul. Def Soul later had a Classics imprint; Patti LaBelle's album Timeless Journey, released May 4, 2004, was its inaugural project. Island's 4th & B'way Records was also folded into Def Jam. Also starting in 1998, in preparation for the year 2000, Def Jam marketed and sponsored a new campaign titled Def Jam 2000. Def Jam 2000 was the featured name for Def Jam on Def Jam albums from 1998 until its end in December 2000.

Also in 1999, the label began to distribute releases by Murder Inc. Records, the newly founded label run by former Def Jam A&R executive and record producer Irv Gotti. The label's roster of artists would include Ja Rule, Ashanti and Lloyd, among others. The first release from Murder Inc. under Def Jam was Ja Rule's debut studio album, Venni Vetti Vecci. The album, released on June 1, 1999, peaked at number three on the Billboard 200 and was certified platinum in America. It featured guest appearances from Jay-Z, Ron Isley, and DMX.

In December 1999, DMX released his third studio album, ...And Then There Was X through Def Jam. The album debuted atop the Billboard 200, with close to 700,000 copies sold, making it his third straight album to debut atop the charts. The album sold over 4.9 million copies to date, and has been certified five times platinum by the RIAA.

The following year, it launched another subsidiary, Def Jam South, which focused on Southern rap and distributed releases from labels such as Disturbing tha Peace, whose artist roster included its co-founder Ludacris, Shawnna, Bobby Valentino and Playaz Circle. Russell Simmons tapped Houston hip-hop legend and former Rap-A-Lot recording artist Scarface as the original head of Def Jam South.

On October 10, 2000, Def Jam and Murder Inc. released Ja Rule's second studio album, Rule 3:36. Anchored by the success of the single, "Between Me and You", the album topped the Billboard 200 and was certified triple platinum in the United States.

In 2000, Island Def Jam announced the formation of Def Jam Germany, the first international Def Jam company. This increased the label's presence around the world. Def Jam Germany signed German rappers Spezializtz and Philly MC. The label was located in Berlin and opened on May 23, 2000. In addition to signing and marketing local artists, Def Jam Germany also marketed all U.S. signed Def Jam artists in the German territory. But the German division folded just two years later in 2002. Many of the artists were picked up by Universal/Urban, while others did not get a new contract.

The new millennium saw Roc-A-Fella, Def Jam's subsidiary, begin to expand beyond one figurehead artist. Roc-A-Fella Records artists proved successful with Jay-Z's The Dynasty: Roc La Familia (2000) and The Blueprint (2001), including the labels other signees gaining recognition with Beanie Sigel's The Truth and Memphis Bleek's The Understanding (both in 2000).

The second international label is a Japanese branch, Def Jam Japan (デフ・ジャム・ジャパン, Defu Jamu Japan), also founded in 2000. The label was later rebranded as Def Jam Recordings; however, it is sometimes still referred to as Def Jam Japan. As of 2023, the Def Jam name in Japan is currently operative under Virgin Music Group for optional releases. Their artist roster has included Japanese-American singer Ai, Teriyaki Boyz, AK-69, Nitro Microphone Underground, and South Korean boy band BTS.

Ja Rule released his third studio album, Pain Is Love, on October 2, 2001, through Murder Inc./Def Jam. Pain Is Love topped the Billboard 200 with first-week sales of 361,000 copies and was certified triple platinum by the RIAA. The album was supported by the singles: "Down Ass Bitch", "Always on Time", and "Livin' It Up".

In January 2003, Murder Inc. became the center of a money laundering investigation involving illegal profits from drug trading, leading to the label's eventual release from its distribution contract by 2005. Def Jam also blocked Murder Inc. and TVT Records from releasing a Cash Money Click reunion album, due to Ja Rule's contractual obligations, which alleged that Cohen paid Ja and Irv Gotti US$8 million not to submit the project to TVT, but instead to parent company Universal. This resulted in TVT suing Def Jam, alleging infringement, fraud and tortious interference, winning $132 million in a judgment, but was later reduced to $126,000 after Universal and Def Jam appealed the ruling, claiming that the existence of an agreement between the parties meant that their behavior was only a breach of contract and not fraud. That September, DMX released his fifth album, Grand Champ. Though it was DMX's fifth number one album and was certified platinum by the RIAA, it was his final album for the label before leaving in 2006. Also that September, Def Jam released the video game, Def Jam: Fight for NY. The video game, which was a sequel to Def Jam Vendetta, featured artists from the label. These artists include Method Man & Redman, N.O.R.E., Ludacris, Ghostface Killah, Memphis Bleek, and Joe Budden.

The final shares of Roc-A-Fella Records were sold to Island Def Jam in 2004 for $10 million. By that time, Roc-A-Fella and Def Jam had launched the career of rapper-producer Kanye West. His debut, The College Dropout, went on to sell over two million copies. Co-founder Damon Dash and Kareem "Biggs" Burke were forced out of the label as Cohen left IDJMG for Warner Music Group, and was replaced by music executive Antonio "L.A." Reid. Frustrated, Liles and now-chairwoman of Atlantic Records, Julie Greenwald eventually decided to follow Cohen to Warner. Additionally, Mike Kyser left Def Jam to work for Atlantic Records under Cohen. That same year, through Def Jam A&R executive Shakir Stewart, Def Jam signed Atlanta, Georgia based rapper Young Jeezy. His debut album, Let's Get It: Thug Motivation 101, was released in July 2005 and was co-executive produced by Stewart. The album's singles, "Go Crazy", and "Soul Survivor", helped push the album to double platinum status in America. Around this time, a bidding war for Jay-Z's contract began, and Reid appointed Jay-Z president of Def Jam on December 8, 2004. Long time label veterans LL Cool J and DMX (the latter of whom had five number one albums under the label within a five-year gap between 1998 and 2003), as well as new signee Joe Budden expressed discomfort with Jay-Z's leadership of the label, having altogether left the label since then.

Under Jay-Z's leadership, Def Jam launched the successful careers of contemporary R&B singers Rihanna and Ne-Yo. At the end of 2007, after he released American Gangster, Jay-Z decided not to renew his contract as the president and CEO of Def Jam in order to start his new Live Nation venture, Roc Nation. Following Jay-Z's departure, L.A. Reid took over leadership of the label, as opposed to hiring a replacement. In June 2008, Shakir Stewart was appointed as the executive vice president of Def Jam, a position that was previously left vacant since December 2007. However, on November 1, Stewart committed suicide.

In March 2012, it was announced that former Warner Bros. Records executive Joie Manda would become the first president of Def Jam since Jay-Z. Around the summer of 2011, after Universal Music disbanded the Universal Motown Republic Group, Motown Records would be moved under the Island Def Jam umbrella. In 2012, Manda assumed the position of president until March 2013 when he exited his post. It was later announced by his former boss, Barry Weiss, that he would be in charge of the urban division at Def Jam's sister Universal Music label, Interscope Records. The-Dream was Def Jam's executive vice president of A&R at Def Jam between 2012 and 2014. No I.D. held the position of executive vice president after helping to establish GOOD Music with Kanye West. He later became the executive vice president of the urban division at Def Jam's sister Universal label, Capitol Music Group.

On April 1, 2014, it was announced that the Island Def Jam Music Group would no longer be active following the resignation of CEO Barry Weiss. A press release serviced by Universal Music Group stated that IDJMG, and all of its assets would be reorganized into Def Jam, Island and Motown, all as separate entities.

During this time, Def Jam Recordings operated as a stand-alone label within the Universal Music Group. Def Jam signed DaniLeigh to the label in early 2017. Steve Bartels, former president and COO of IDJMG, was CEO of Def Jam since 2013 until an announcement commenced on August 3, 2017, stating that in January 2018, Eminem's manager and co-founder of Shady Records, Paul Rosenberg would be appointed chairman and CEO of Def Jam.

On September 17, 2019, the launch of Def Jam South East Asia was announced at Music Matters, an annual music industry conference held in Singapore, where Joe Flizzow from Malaysia, Daboyway from Thailand, Yung Raja, Fariz Jabba and Alif from Singapore and A. Nayaka from Indonesia were announced as the label's six inaugural signings. That same month, Def Jam re-signed LL Cool J and DMX after nine and fourteen respective years apart from the label.

In late 2019, the label made its debut in the Philippines through Universal Music Philippines, led by former Sony Music Philippines and Sindikato Management executive Enzo Valdez. Pinoy hip-hop quartet VVS Collective was the label's first signed artists.

On February 21, 2020, Paul Rosenberg stepped down on his positions as chairman and CEO of Def Jam. He was replaced by the head of business affairs at Universal Music, Jeffrey Harleston, who instead assumed interim control over the label. That November, Def Jam teamed up with Alex and Alec Boateng to create a new UK spin-off label called 0207 Def Jam under Universal Music UK's EMI Records. Stormzy was the first act signed to the label. Later in 2024, UMG UK reassigned 0207 Def Jam's distribution under Polydor Records, placing the label alongside Capitol Records and A&M Records' regional divisions through its Polydor Music Group portfolio. Def Jam also expanded to Africa with the creation of Def Jam Africa.

On April 9, 2021, returning label veteran DMX died at a hospital in White Plains, New York, at age 50, after a heart attack. A month later, Def Jam released his posthumous album, Exodus, which debuted and peaked in the top ten on the Billboard 200. Two digital greatest hits albums by DMX were also available for streaming under the label throughout the same period: A Dog's Prayer and The Legacy.

Later that year, Harleston conference-called hip-hop legend Snoop Dogg and named him the executive consultant of Def Jam. Snoop agreed to Harleston's request and took over the consultancy role in July. In August 2021, Harleston announced that he will replace himself as the interim president of Def Jam with former Interscope/RCA executive and Keep Cool founder Tunji Balogun, who agreed to take on the role as chairman and CEO, which he did on New Year's Day 2022. In February 2022, Def Jam expanded to India with creation of Def Jam India.

In late-October 2022, Def Jam ended its partnership with GOOD Music, Kanye West's label, in response to the founder's online and public media outbursts, including his 2024 presidential campaign, antisemitic and pro-race remarks. Although, West had already been exiled from the label after releasing Donda on August 29, 2021, as so Pusha T after he released his fourth studio album, It's Almost Dry, on April 22, 2022; it debuted at number one on the Billboard 200. The split made 070 Shake's You Can't Kill Me the final release under the GOOD/Def Jam partnership as thought until the 2024 release of her follow-up, Petrichor.

On October 31, 2023, the label's core artist, Jeezy, had fulfilled his contract with Def Jam. Meanwhile, the label had already signed Washington, D.C. rapper Wale. Also in 2024, Clipse announced they signed to Def Jam. They were later dropped the following year due to creative and political issues with the label. They would later release their planned album, Let God Sort Em Out, independently (some sources say it was released under Roc Nation), though Def Jam continued to receive royalties for the project.

Following an announcement in 2024 from Universal Music Group regarding a reorganization of its labels, Republic Records, Mercury Records, Island Records, Motown, and Def Jam Recordings among others are now aligned under the Republic Corps unit, known as The REPUBLIC Collective. Each label in the new structure will maintain independence and autonomy, preserving its unique identity.

Rapper 2 Chainz, who had previously joined Def Jam via Disturbing the Peace, parted ways with the imprint in late 2024. Also in 2024, LL Cool J (who had rejoined Def Jam in 2019) released The FORCE, his first studio album since Authentic (2013) and his first Def Jam album since Exit 13 (2008). Singers and labelmates Teyana Taylor, Alessia Cara and Coco Jones released their albums under the label in 2025.

On January 20, 2026, Universal Music Greater China launched Def Jam Recordings China, headquartered in Chengdu, and named Xie Di, Yitai Wang, and Deng Dianguo ("DDG") as special guest curators. In October 2026, Universal Music Group announced that chairman and CEO Tunji Balogun would leave Def Jam, remaining through the end of the year to help with the transition.

== CEOs and chairpersons ==
- Lyor Cohen (2002–2004)
- L.A. Reid (2004–2011)
- Barry Weiss (2011–2014)
- Steve Bartels (2014–2017)
- Paul Rosenberg (2018–2020)
- Jeffrey Harleston (acting, 2020–2022)
- Tunji Balogun (2022–present)

== Presidents ==
- Lyor Cohen (1988–1998)
- Kevin Liles (1998–2004)
- Jay-Z (2005–2007)
- Joie Manda (2012–2013)

== Executive vice presidents A&R ==
- Shakir Stewart (2008)
- The-Dream (2012–2014)
- No I.D. (2014–2017)
- Steven Victor (2018–2019)
- Rodney Shealey (2019–2021)
- Noah Preston (promoted 2021)

== Current artists ==
- 070 Shake
- Big Sean
- Chuck D
- Coco Jones
- Elmiene
- Fabolous
- Jadakiss
- Jae Stephens
- Jai'Len Josey
- Jhené Aiko
- Justin Bieber
- Leven Kali
- Liamani Segura
- LL Cool J
- Muni Long
- Odumodublvck
- PartyOf2
- Public Enemy
- Rihanna
- Skip Marley
- Teyana Taylor
- ThankGod4Cody
- Wale

== See also ==
- Krush Groove
- Def Jam Recordings discography
