= List of Bratz home video releases =

This is a list of home video releases of the Bratz animated television series and its related films.

== Films ==
List of films
Title	Film details
Bratz The Video – Starrin' & Stylin'	Released: Region 1: August 3, 2004; Region 2: September 27, 2004; Studio: 20th Century Fox; Formats: DVD, VHS
Bratz: Rock Angelz	Released: Region 1: September 13, 2005; Region 2: September 26, 2005; Region 4: October 11, 2005; Studio: 20th Century Fox; Format: DVD, VHS
Bratz: Genie Magic	Released: Region 1: April 11, 2006; Region 2: April 17, 2006; Studio: 20th Century Fox; Format: DVD

Title	Release date			Discs	Notes
Title	Region 1	Region 2	Region 4	Discs	Notes
Bratz Babyz – The Movie	September 12, 2006	January 1, 2007	—N/a	1	—N/a
Bratz: Passion 4 Fashion – Diamondz	September 26, 2006	November 12, 2006	—N/a	1	—N/a
Bratz: Fashion Pixiez	February 27, 2007	April 2, 2007	April 4, 2007	1	—N/a
Bratz Kidz: Sleep-over Adventure	July 31, 2007	May 21, 2007	—N/a	1	—N/a
Bratz Super Babyz	October 9, 2007	—N/a	October 10, 2007	1	—N/a
Bratz Kidz: Fairy Tales	February 26, 2008	March 17, 2008	—N/a	1	—N/a
Bratz Girlz Really Rock	September 2, 2008	October 20, 2008	—N/a	1	—N/a
Bratz Babyz Save Christmas	November 4, 2008	—N/a	November 4, 2013	1	Region 1 release contains five Bratzillaz specials
Bratz: Pampered Petz	October 5, 2010	—N/a	January 1, 2011	1	—N/a
Bratz: Desert Jewelz	January 10, 2012	—N/a	March 1, 2012	1	—N/a
Bratz Go to Paris – The Movie	October 8, 2013	—N/a	—N/a	1	—N/a

== Episodic compilations ==
Title	Release date			Discs	Episodes
Title	Region 1	Region 2	Region 4	Discs	Episodes
Slumber Party	—N/a	—N/a	April 5, 2006	1	"Not So Hot for Teacher"; "Kidnapped"; "Sasha's Big Interview"; "Slumber Party"
Pet Show	—N/a	September 8, 2008	December 5, 2006	1	"Pet Show"; "Truth or Dare"; "Manicuring Candidate"; "'It's Not About Me' Week"
Camping	—N/a	July 27, 2009	March 7, 2007	1	"Trading Faces"; "Camping"; "Skeletons in the Closet"; "Jade's Dream"
Rock N Princess	—N/a	October 15, 2007	—N/a	1	"Bewitched and Bothered"; "Survivor"; "To Catch a Thief"; "Cinderella"; "Clip Show – Totally Recall"
Pariz	—N/a	May 26, 2008	November 7, 2007	1	"New Kid in Town"; "Paris I"; "Paris II"; "Paris III"; "Clip Show – Model Friend"
Rally 500	—N/a	—N/a	February 5, 2008	1	"Extremely Made-over"; "The Cloe Life"; "The Bratz 500"; "A Little Diss, A Little Dat"
Fortunez	—N/a	—N/a	June 4, 2008	1	"Miss Fortune"; "Bratz Fail"; "Bratz vs. Brats"; "Inner Beauty Queen"
A Sporting Chance	—N/a	—N/a	September 2, 2009	1	"Transparently Yours"; "A Sporting Chance"; "Alien Encounterz"; "Rescue Askew"; "Bye Bye Burdine"
The Great Melting Pot	—N/a	—N/a	September 2, 2009	1	"The Great Melting Pot"; "The Chronicles Of Karma"; "The Life Of Byron"; "Much Ado About Practically Nothing"
Good Vibes	March 22, 2011	—N/a	—N/a	1	"Bratz vs. Brats"; "Inner Beauty Queens"; "The Chronicles of Karma"; "A Sporting Chance"
Best Friends Forever	June 7, 2011	—N/a	—N/a	1	"Extremely Madeover"; "The Cloe Life"; "The Great Melting Pot"; "Bye-Bye Burdine"

== Box sets ==
Title	Release date			Discs	Notes
Title	Region 1	Region 2	Region 4	Discs	Notes
Rock Angelz / Starrin' & Stylin'	—N/a	September 26, 2005	September 26, 2007	2	—N/a
OMG Collection!	—N/a	—N/a	July 8, 2009	5	—N/a
Totally Stylin' Collection	—N/a	—N/a	September 2, 2009	4	—N/a
Jewel Collection	—N/a	—N/a	September 2, 2009	3	—N/a
Bratz Movie Collection	—N/a	—N/a	December 1, 2010	5	—N/a
3-Movie Collection	November 1, 2011	—N/a	—N/a	3	—N/a

== Interactive DVDs ==
Title	Release date			Discs	Notes
Title	Region 1	Region 2	Region 4	Discs	Notes
Livin' It Up! with the Bratz	August 1, 2006	February 11, 2008	May 5, 2009	1	—N/a
Glitz 'N' Glamour	February 6, 2007	November 19, 2007	July 7, 2009	1	—N/a
Lil' Bratz Party Time	July 15, 2008	—N/a	—N/a	1	—N/a
