= Bratz (TV series) =

Animated television series

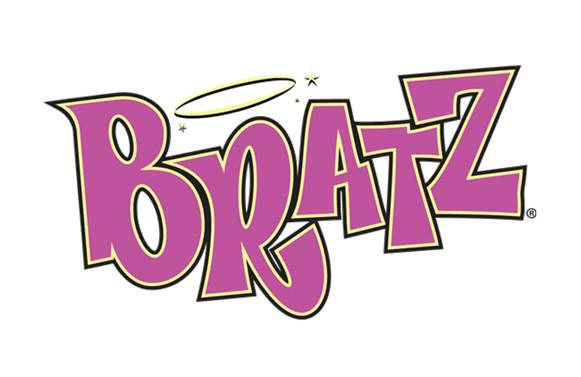
- Genre: Adventure; Comedy-drama; Teen drama
- Based on: Bratz by Carter Bryant
- Developed by: Peggy Nicoll
- Directed by: Mucci Fassett
- Voices of: Olivia Hack; Soleil Moon Frye; Tia Mowry; Dionne Quan; Wendie Malick; Lacey Chabert; Kaley Cuoco
- Theme music composer: Matthew Gerrard
- Opening theme: "Bratz Main Theme" by Lauren Evans
- Ending theme: "Bratz Main Theme" (instrumental)
- Country of origin: United States
- Original language: English
- No. of seasons: 2
- No. of episodes: 40

Production
- Executive producer: Isaac Larian
- Producers: Mike Young; Bill Schultz
- Editor: Michael Bradley
- Running time: 21 minutes
- Production companies: Mike Young Productions; MGA Entertainment

Original release
- Network: Fox (4Kids TV)
- Release: September 10, 2005 – February 26, 2008

Related
- Bratzillaz

Bratz (also known as Bratz: The Series) is an American animated television series based on the Bratz toy dolls. Produced by Mike Young Productions and MGA Entertainment, it aired on Fox's 4Kids TV from September 10, 2005, to October 14, 2006. In 2008, after a hiatus, it was renewed for season 2. It focuses on four female teens who run their own magazine.

== Premise ==
Set in the fictional city of Stilesville, the show revolves around four teenagers (Cloe, Jade, Sasha, Yasmin) running their own teen magazine, titled "Bratz", while struggling with life at Stiles High School. Their rival magazine is "Your Thing", owned and run by the proud and demanding self-proclaimed "Reigning Queen of Fashion" Burdine Maxwell, and her mean identical twin interns Kirstee and Kaycee, known infamously as "the Tweevils". Accompanied by their friends Dylan, Cameron and Eitan, the girls' issues are exploited throughout the series, both in and outside of Stilesville.

=== Characters ===
==== Main characters ====
- Cloe (Angel) (voiced by Olivia Hack in season 1; Britt McKillip in season 2): Cloe is in charge of the "Dear Cloe" column in the magazine, where readers write to her for teen advice. She is characterized by her romantic, dreamy and outgoing attitude, as well as her highly dramatic tendencies, hence specializing in acting and debating. Although she enjoys shopping and fashion, she plays in a tomboy side through skateboarding and riding a motorcycle. Her love interest is Cameron.
- Sasha (Bunny Boo) (voiced by Tia Mowry in season 1; Dorla Bell in season 2): Sasha is the music editor of the group and specializes in hip-hop dancing and creating songs. She is described by her bold and sassy attitude, although this can sometimes backfire and make her become with perfectionism and controlling. Her catchphrase is "Let's move, People!" Like Cloe, she can be a tomboy sometimes, which is reflected in her fashion of dressing. Sasha is a natural born leader.
- Jade (Kool Kat) (voiced by Soleil Moon Frye in season 1; Britt Irvin in season 2): Jade is the fashion editor of the group with a bubbly, open and sensitive personality. After she gets unreasonably fired from an internship at "Your Thing" magazine by Burdine, the girls decided to make their own magazine.
- Yasmin (Pretty Princess) (voiced by Dionne Quan in season 1; Maryke Hendrikse in season 2): Yasmin is the main journalist for the magazine due to her passion for literature. Known for her sensitive, sweet and intelligent personality, she has a strong philanthropic side, owning her own animal shelter. Her love interest is Eitan.
- Burdine Maxwell (voiced by Wendie Malick in season 1; Ellie Harvie in season 2): Burdine is the head of "Your Thing" magazine. She is, in reality, unintentionally responsible for the creation of Bratz magazine after firing Jade unreasonably during the latter's internship. Quick to anger, impatient and bossy, she proclaims herself the "Reigning Queen of Fashion", choosing to uphold this title by dressing constantly in same pink suits and owning over 50 pairs of old-fashioned pink pumps. Her catchphrase is: "Mother of Pink!" and "Chop chop!" She dotes on her dog miniature pinscher Royale and has an almost identical-looking twin sister named Burnice.
- Kirstee (voiced by Kaley Cuoco in season 1; Ashleigh Ball in season 2): Kirstee the oldest of the Tweevils who does her bun with a crown-shaped hair tie. Due to being older and more intelligent she tends to lead and facilitate the twins' various operations.
- Kaycee (voiced by Lacey Chabert in season 1; Kelly Sheridan in season 2): Kaycee is the youngest of the Tweevils who does her bun with a ribbon-shaped hair tie and has an adhesive bandage on her nose which, according to Sasha, was the result for three times of rhinoplasty following accidents involving it. Her catchphrase is: "Oww! My nose!" She tends to be less intelligent and has a higher voice than her sister.

==== Supporting characters ====
- Cameron (The Blaze) (voiced by Charlie Schlatter in season 1; Ian James Corlett in season 2): Cameron, often nicknamed as "Cam", is a good friend to the Bratz and has a passion for motorcycles. He's in love with Cloe and is her main love interest.
- Dylan (The Fox) (voiced by Ogie Banks in season 1; Adrian Holmes in season 2): Dylan, often nicknamed as "Dyl-Man", is another boy who has a habit of annoying the Bratz, usually resulting them in saying "Goodbye Dylan!". Although he is flirtatious and outgoing, he has a heart of gold and is there for the Bratz whenever they need him.
- Eitan (The Dragon) (voiced by Josh Keaton in season 1; Trevor Devall in season 2): Eitan is a boy who works at a smoothie bar in the mall area of Stilesville. He does not appear as often as either Cameron or Dylan do. He is in love with Yasmin and in one episode ("Crush in a Rush"), Eitan agreed to ask Yasmin out on a date while in turn, the others would make a magazine article based on it. However, Yasmin learns this from the Tweevils and rejects Eitan in anger, although they later reconcile near the episode's end.
- Byron Powell (voiced by Greg Ellis in season 1; Alistair Abell in season 2): Byron is a man from London whom the Bratz (along with Cameron and Dylan) first met in Bratz: Rock Angelz. He lives the double life of being a reality TV show host and a secret agent at the same time, and recruits the Bratz for some of his missions. He appears to be a parody of Simon Cowell (American Idol).
- Aloncé (voiced by Cree Summer and singing vocals by Lauren Evans): Aloncé is an R&B singer who is Sasha's favorite musician. A parody of Beyoncé, she only appears in "Sasha's Big Interview" and cutscenes of the video game Bratz: The Movie and she was mentioned in the episode "Not So Hot For Teacher". Her hit singles are "Everything", "My Attitude", and "Shining Like Real Diamondz". According to Sasha and Jade, she has a moon tattoo on the back of her hand, two albums that went platinum, and a Grammy Award.

== Voice actors ==
The voice cast of season one was replaced in the second season. In 2023, one of the original voice actors anonymously revealed the reason none of the original cast returned for a second season was due to the 2007–2008 Writers Guild of America strike and the mishandling of finances by MGA Entertainment. Season 2's cast features Canadian voice actors Britt McKillip, Britt Irvin, Dorla Bell, Maryke Hendrikse, Ellie Harvie, Kelly Sheridan, and Ashleigh Ball taking the main roles.

== Episodes ==
=== Series overview ===
Season	Episodes	Originally released	
Season	Episodes	First released	Last released
1	23	September 10, 2005	October 14, 2006
2	17	February 4, 2008	February 26, 2008

=== Season 1 (2005–06) ===
No. overall	No. in season	Title	Directed by	Written by	Original release date	Prod. code
1	1	"Crush in a Rush"	Mucci Fassett	Peggy Nicoll	September 10, 2005	102
The girls try to balance writing a dating article while planning a magazine safari party. Dylan gives Eitan advice on how to ask out his crush. Meanwhile, Yasmin struggles to write a poem for her English class.
2	2	"Not So Hot for Teacher"	Mucci Fassett	Peter A. Knight	September 17, 2005	103
The Bratz sign up for a fashion course and the new teacher is Burdine Maxwell. Burdine is determined to give the Bratz a lot of work so they are unable to continue the magazine. Cloe is warned that if she does not keep her grades up she will have to quit her job at Bratz Magazine. Dylan is rewarded with the honour of being Stiles High's "Most Attractive Male" just for being himself.
3	3	"Kidnapped"	Mucci Fassett	Peggy Nicoll	September 24, 2005	104
Yasmin has arranged an interview with the popular London Milton. However, just before this interview, Yasmin and London Milton are kidnapped. To make matters worse, so are Kirstee and Kaycee.
4	4	"Slumber Party"	Mucci Fassett	Peggy Nicoll	October 1, 2005	110
After Cameron cancels Cloe's study date, the girls decide to throw a slumber party. Burdine finds out about the Bratz slumber party and orders the Tweevils to steal ideas for the magazine. This plan fails and ends with the Tweevils being pulled out of the house by their ears.
5	5	"Sasha's Big Interview"	Mucci Fassett	Peggy Nicoll	October 8, 2005	105
Sasha is excited about her upcoming interview with singer, songwriter, dancer, actress, and record producer Aloncé. Unfortunately, for Sasha, the Tweevils have secured her press pass and she cannot interview Aloncé. And to make things worse, she loses her voice.
6	6	"Pet Show"	Mucci Fassett	Glenn Eichler	October 15, 2005	106
Jade and Burdine enter their pets into the International Pet Show. Jade and Burdine soon realize that a mean, vicious petnapper, Chachi, is kidnapping dogs and cats throughout Stilesville so that his mutt will win the contest.
7	7	"Manicuring Candidate"	Mucci Fassett	Peter A. Knight	October 22, 2005	107
The Tweevils and Dylan run for office against Cloe. Dylan and Cloe fall out and Cloe wants to leave the race. It is revealed that the Tweevils are only running for office because Burdine told them to. Cloe decides to stay in the race and team up with Dylan. After becoming a team, Dylan realizes that Cloe is the better candidate.
8	8	""It's Not About Me" Week"	Mucci Fassett	Peggy Nicoll	November 5, 2005	108
Class president Cloe has organized "It's Not About Me" week to encourage students to think about others; Cloe has to host the Teen Hotline with Kirstee. Sasha must teach Kaycee at the worst driver in school how to drive, Yasmin coaches Dylan on self-defense, and Jade gives someone a makeover. Dylan also hides from a bully.
9	9	"Trading Faces"	Mucci Fassett	Cliff Macgillivray & Kelly Ward	November 12, 2005	109
To find out what women really want (or more specifically, what Fianna wants), Dylan enters a women's dance contest in drag. Sasha becomes jealous when her friends start paying attention to Fianna.
10	10	"Truth or Dare"	Mucci Fassett	Peggy Nicoll	November 19, 2005	111
Following the episode "Slumber Party", the Bratz engage in a game of Truth or Dare. The Tweevils return to the party, and give everybody unbelievable dares. Sasha must teach Kirstee how to dance. Cloe and Kaycee must go on an adventure together. Yasmin must talk Cameron into letting her ride his motorcycle. And lastly, Jade has to get a picture of Burdine without her makeup.
11	11	"Bewitched and Bothered"	Mucci Fassett	Jennifer Klein; Michael Stokes	November 26, 2005	113
Using a new hypnosis tool, Burdine hypnotizes Sasha and Jade, directing them to sabotage the Bratz on the night they are to receive the "Tween Voice Award".
12	12	"Skeletons in the Closet"	Mucci Fassett	Glenn Eichler	December 3, 2005	112
After the Tweevils fail to get information on the Bratz from their slumber party, they are punished with chores. However, the duo find mysterious bones inside Burdine's closet. The Bratz and the Tweevils suspect that Burdine may have killed off her last intern.
13	13	"Camping"	Mucci Fassett	Jennifer Klein	December 10, 2005	114
The Bratz become reluctant overnight campers when they get lost on their way to the Wilderness Spa. The Tweevils, hoping to get some embarrassing pictures of the girls without make-up, follow behind.
14	14	"Survivor"	Mucci Fassett	Glenn Eichler	January 28, 2006	115
The Bratz and the Tweevils journey to the Wilderness Hotel and engage in a Survivor like contest, hosted by Byron Powell. Playing games like tug of war and sitting in the hot tub are only some of the fun adventures the girls take on in the wilderness. The girls are challenged to make it out of the wilderness alive and once they do it is questioned who the winner will be.
15	15	"To Catch a Thief"	Mucci Fassett	Peggy Nicoll	February 4, 2006	116
At the Wilderness Spa, the Bratz try to discover the identity of a mysterious cat-burglar who's been stealing jewels from the hotel's guests. The girls switch their usual city chic outfits for a stylish wilderness wardrobe.
16	16	"Cinderella"	Mucci Fassett	Katherine Butler	March 11, 2006	117
Yasmin writes a story based on 'Cinderella'. Yasmin herself is featured as 'Amberella'. Burdine is featured as her stepmother and the Tweevils are her two evil wicked stepsisters.
17	17	"Jade's Dream"	Mucci Fassett	Ellen Levy-Sarnoff	March 18, 2006	118
Jade gets knocked unconscious and dreams that Burdine and the Tweevils have taken over Stilesville and the world, turning everything pink and wiping out individuality. Since the Bratz are all about independence and creating their own sense of fashion, this was a nightmare for them.
18	18	"Clip Show: Totally Recall"	Mucci Fassett	Peggy Nicoll	March 25, 2006	119
While stuck in the elevator, Burdine and Jade reflect on their eventful past!
19	19	"New Kid in Town"	Mucci Fassett	Peggy Nicoll	September 16, 2006	120
Shane is the new guy in school and he is so stylin' that the Bratz are fighting over him!
20	20	"Go to Paris I / Bratz in Playland"	Mucci Fassett	Peggy Nicoll	September 23, 2006	121
Byron confesses to the girls that he is an undercover spy, investigating a case involving poisoned super-models in Paris. The girls go through training and begin to argue over who Byron will select to go on the mission.
21	21	"Go to Paris II / Bratz in Franceland"	Mucci Fassett	Peggy Nicoll	September 30, 2006	122
The Bratz arrive in France to investigate the poisonings. During the mission, the girls become distracted when Sasha falls for Roxxi's former band mate Cruise, Jade becomes Jean Paul's muse, Yasmin has an intense case of writer's block, and Cloe becomes jealous when Cameron falls for super-model Nicole. Later, the girls find hair samples and fingerprints that belong to Elemina on a bottle of poisoned water; Byron congratulates the girls on a job well done.
22	22	"Go to Paris III / Bratz in Ragland"	Mucci Fassett	Peggy Nicoll	October 7, 2006	123
The girls suspect that Elemina has been framed, and that someone else is behind the poisonings. Jade and Cloe become victims, while Sasha and Yasmin struggle to keep their cover during Jean Paul's fashion show. Too weak to fight, Cloe and Jade enlist the help of their friends to save them and uncover the antidote before time runs out.
23	23	"Clip Show: Model Friends"	Mucci Fassett	Peggy Nicoll	October 14, 2006	124
The Bratz are planning a birthday party for Yasmin. However, Sasha decides to leave the Bratz to pursue a modeling career but can't quite leave the past behind.

=== Season 2 (2008) ===
No. overall	No. in season	Title	Directed by	Written by	Original release date
24	1	"Extremely Made-Over"	Phil Weinstein	Tom K. Mason	February 4, 2008
The Bratz think they've hired the perfect office assistant until they discover the shy girl, Prudence, is an undercover agent for Burdine, sent to steal the Bratz' latest interview. Then the Bratz want her to get out of their sight forever.
25	2	"The Cloe Life"	Phil Weinstein	Katherine Butler	February 5, 2008
Portia, an interviewer, goes to Stiles High and picks Cloe to interview titling the interview, the "Cloe Life". Portia decides to supposedly recommend Cloe for her own show, but when Portia is rude to Jade, Yasmin, and Sasha they try to warn Cloe about her.
26	3	"The Bratz 500"	Phil Weinstein	Bart Jennett	February 6, 2008
Byron asks the Bratz if they would help him with another mission to figure out who is stealing jewelry that is in the rally 500 race. Byron tells the girls that Liam, top teen racer, could be in trouble causing Jade to say yes for all of them immediately. The Bratz find out that they have to go undercover as a racing team.
27	4	"A Little Diss, A Little Dat"	Phil Weinstein	Michael Prescott	February 7, 2008
Sasha, Cloe, and Yasmin had to rush off to do a few last-minute interviews. Later, grabbing smoothies before heading back to the office, they talk about how it was a horrible day and that they are so glad that Jade was not there as they did not want her to feel as bad as they did. Jade overhears the wrong part of the conversation. Kirstee and Kaycee can't do anything right so Burdine fires them. The twins and Jade become friends. Burdine is given a taste of her own medicine when she is bossed around by her drill sergeant-like temp named Dagmar.
28	5	"A Sporting Chance"	Phil Weinstein	Jen Klein	February 8, 2008
The Bratz girls search for a missing synchronized swimming team's mascot, which is a Billy Goat.
29	6	"Transparently Yours"	Phil Weinstein	Michelle Gendelman	February 11, 2008
Byron trust the girls to keep an eye on a case that contains an invisibility formula which is perfume for spies. Jade and Sasha spray it on themselves and turns into invisible and when it wears off they are locked in a room apartment with Burdine's sister, Burnice, Kirstee and Kaycee.
30	7	"Miss Fortune"	Phil Weinstein	Jen Klein	February 12, 2008
The Bratz are having a horrible day. Cloe wishes that they could have good luck. A wind carries Sasha's ticket away. They chase after it and meet a strange lady who gives them a necklace that provides good luck. When Kirstee and Kaycee hear about the necklace they steal it from the Bratz. They find out whoever loses the necklace will have terrible luck.
31	8	"Bratz Fail"	Phil Weinstein	Phil Walsh	February 13, 2008
The Bratz just came back from a mission and they missed their finals so their gym teacher, who is working for Burdine, gave them all F's. The Bratz take this matter to the principal who gives them a make-up exam, but the gym teacher will stop at nothing to make the Bratz fail.
32	9	"Bratz vs. Brats"	Phil Weinstein	Catherine Lieuwen	February 14, 2008
Fashion designer Jules holds a contest between Bratz and Your Thing magazine to decide who he will give an advertising account to. But when his kids Ashton and Ashley's nanny suddenly leaves, the kids have nowhere to go. Jules has the Bratz take them in, using the account as an incentive. The children turn out be serious brats, antagonising the Bratz and causing chaos in the office. Burdine sends Kirstee and Kaycee to try to bring Jules' kids to them so they win the ad.
33	10	"Inner Beauty Queen"	Phil Weinstein	Katherine Butler	February 15, 2008
Yasmin is elected prom queen and is stressing to find a date to the dance.
34	11	"Alien Encounters"	Phil Weinstein	Dank Danko	February 18, 2008
Sasha wants to make a big difference in the world. She gets the chance when Stiles High is infiltrated by aliens. But it turns out the only way Sasha can make a difference is by letting the Tweevils save the planet. She soon learns that doing good is more important than getting the credit for doing good!
35	12	"Rescue Askew"	Phil Weinstein	Temple Mathews	February 19, 2008
Byron is taken prisoner and he calls the Bratz for help. But they discover that he's also called a teenage boy agent they've never heard of. When both the Bratz and the boy insist that they're Byron's A team, rivalry gets in the way of a successful rescue. They must put aside their differences for the common good, and in doing so, learn that everyone has something valuable to come.
36	13	"Bye-Bye Burdine"	Phil Weinstein	Karl Geurs	February 20, 2008
Burdine is wrongly detained at a Luxenstein prison when her tiara is mistaken for the stolen crown jewels. In her absence, the Tweevils take over Your Thing Magazine. They fill the magazine with ridiculous and not-so-flattering tales of unlikely adventures they imagine Burdine to be having, and the magazine's circulation skyrockets. The Bratz, worried that their magazine will be buried decide to compete — but the Tweevils get their comeuppance when Burdine returns!
37	14	"The Great Melting Pot"	Phil Weinstein	Robert C. Schuleter	February 21, 2008
The Bratz struggle to cook up a classic French meal for famed costume designer Jean-Paul and his friend the Viscount. But as Jean Paul nears Stilesville, he announces that they want a classic American meal. With only an hour to go, the Bratz spring into action, and eventually come up with the perfect American meal and it is quite multi-ethnic.
38	15	"The Chronicles of Karma"	Phil Weinstein	Diana Fassett	February 22, 2008
A discussion about karma leads Sasha, Cloe and Jade to try and do good deeds in hopes that good things will happen to them in return. They fail, because their motives are selfish. Meanwhile, when Yasmin selflessly rescues the Tweevils from a life of petty shoplifting and inadvertently ends up sentenced to community service, she and the Tweevils help an unfortunate soul — and are rewarded more handsomely than she could have imagine.
39	16	"The Life of Byron"	Phil Weinstein	Bart Jennett	February 25, 2008
When Byron invites the Bratz to London for an awards bash, they quickly find it's a trap - Byron's been kidnapped by another Byron. A villain has had plastic surgery to look just like him and now it's up to the Bratz to figure out which one is bad, which one is good.
40	17	"Much Ado About Practically Nothing"	Phil Weinstein	Bart Jennett	February 26, 2008
A mysterious bowtie found laying on Jade's desk causes trouble left and right.

=== Specials (2006–08) ===
No. overall	No. in season	Title	Directed by	Written by	Original release date	Prod. code
1	1	"Livin' It Up with the Bratz"	Sean Maynard	Philippe Jacques	August 1, 2006	99
Lookout, it's the Bratz Girlz, and they are Livin' It Up! This episode follows best friends Jade, Sasha, Yasmin and Cloe where the viewers can choose their fashion choices and what the girls do next. Viewers are able to decide if the girls star in a music video or the complete opposite and work on their school yearbook. There are many different options for the viewers to choose from and have the best Bratz experience.
2	2	"Bratz Glitz 'n' Glamour"	Sean Maynard	Philippe Jacques	February 2, 2007	100
Join the Bratz Girlz for another awesome adventure, where you help decide what the girls will do next. The girls go shopping to find their next go to outfits. They want to find out who can create the best outfit in one hour. When all the girls meet up to show off their new outfits, they all show up in the same outfit in different colours.
3	3	"Lil' Bratz: Party Time!"	Sean Maynard	Philippe Jacques	July 15, 2008	101
You can plan a party with the Lil' Bratz. From picking out the invitations, selecting the cake, setting, and theme - you choose how the Lil' Bratz throw the best party ever! It's everyone's favorite characters, Ailani, Talia, Zada and Nazalia, but this time they are little. With crazy adventures, the girls have no shortage of fun planning their big party!

== Reception ==
Common Sense Media gave the show a 1-star rating, saying that the show might be a bad influence towards young girls and that "Bratz are the modern-day Barbie dolls whose vampy appearance has upset many parents seeking healthy role models for their daughters."

== Spin-off media ==
The show produced films based on the series' line of dolls and spawned video games based its series. Some of the series include spin-offs, like Bratz Babyz, Bratz Kidz or the Bratz in their original style. Others include Bratzillaz and Bratz: C.I.Y. Shoppe Webseries, which included different plots to serve as reboots.

In 2021, a web series titled "Talking' Bratz" that features a similar CGI animation style to the original series, aired on the official Bratz TikTok page. Set in the same world as the original series, it saw cast members Olivia Hack and Ogie Banks reprise their roles as Cloe and Dylan, respectively. The voice cast features Hack, Soleil Moon Frye, Tia Mowry, Dionne Quan, Wendie Malick, Lacey Chabert, and Kaley Cuoco.

== Home media and streaming ==
Various box sets, compilations, specials, and films based on Bratz characters were released on DVD between 2004 and 2011. Between 2018 and 2020, the Bratz YouTube channel uploaded all episodes of the series.
