= Dionne Quan =

American voice actress

- Born: October 20, 1978 (age 47); Oakland, California, U.S.
- Occupations: Actress; voice actress
- Years active: 1995–present
- Notable work: Kimi Watanabe-Finster in Rugrats; Trixie Tang in The Fairly OddParents

Dionne Quan (born October 20, 1978) is an American voice actress, known for her roles as Kimi Watanabe-Finster in Rugrats and Trixie Tang in The Fairly OddParents.

== Early life ==
Quan was born in Oakland, California to Lori and Daryl Quan, who ran a sewing machine and vacuum store in Vallejo, California. She is legally blind, having been born with optic nerve hypoplasia. Quan grew up in San Francisco, California.

When she was ten, her father heard a radio interview with a teacher who instructed students in voice-over acting, and he immediately enrolled Dionne for lessons. She obtained her first voice work at the age of 14 for television commercials and acted in high school productions. Quan graduated from Benicia High School in 1998.

== Career ==
Quan was cast as Kimi Watanabe in Rugrats in Paris: The Movie (2000), her film debut. She continued playing the role on the series itself, Rugrats, Rugrats Go Wild (2003) and the spinoff All Grown Up!. Quan provided the voice of Trixie Tang in The Fairly OddParents as well as Yasmin in the Bratz franchise. In 2022, Quan came out of retirement where she was announced to be voicing ae-WINTER in the video game Epic Seven. In 2024, she was announced to be voicing Toph Beifong in Avatar Aang: The Last Airbender.

Due to her disability, Quan was given scripts written in braille as opposed to standard lettering.

== Filmography ==
=== Television ===
Year	Title	Role	Notes
1998	I Am Weasel	Girl	Episode: "I Am My Lifetime"
1998	Adventures from the Book of Virtues	Mari	Episode: "Charity"; credited as Dione Quon
1998	Oh Yeah! Cartoons	Queen Rapsheeba	Episode: "ChalkZone: Rapunzel"
1998–2000	The Wild Thornberrys	Shi Shou, Batlaa, Girl Voice	4 episodes
2000–04	Rugrats	Kimi Watanabe-Finster, additional voices	
2001	The Mummy	Ishi	Episode: "Eruption"
2001–11	The Fairly OddParents	Trixie Tang, AJ's Girl Voice, Cheerleaders	
2003–08	All Grown Up!	Kimi Watanabe-Finster, additional voices	
2003	Clifford's Puppy Days	Jenny	2 episodes
2005–06	Bratz	Yasmin	
2005	Kitty's Dish	Lily	
2006	Shorty McShorts' Shorts	Kodama Twins	Episode: "Dudley and Nestor Do Nothing"
2006	Me, Eloise	Yuko	
2009	Wishology	Trixie Tang	Television film
2015	Curious George	Lily, Aunt Ling	Episode: "George's Curious Dragon Dance"

=== Film ===
Year	Title	Role	Notes
2000	Rugrats in Paris: The Movie	Kimi Watanabe-Finster	
2003	Rugrats Go Wild	Kimi Watanabe-Finster	
2005	Bratz Rock Angelz	Yasmin	
2006	Bratz: Passion 4 Fashion Diamondz	Yasmin	
2006	Bratz: Genie Magic	Yasmin	
2013	Bratz Go to Paris: The Movie	Yasmin	
2026	Avatar Aang: The Last Airbender	Toph Beifong	

=== Video games ===
Year	Title	Role	Notes
1998	The ClueFinders Math Adventures	Village Girl	
2000	Rugrats in Paris: The Movie	Kimi Watanabe-Finster	
2001	Rugrats: Totally Angelica	Kimi Watanabe-Finster	
2001	Rugrats: All Growed Up	Kimi Watanabe-Finster	
2002	Rugrats: Royal Ransom	Kimi Watanabe-Finster	
2003	Rugrats Go Wild	Kimi Watanabe-Finster	
2005	Bratz: Rock Angelz	Yasmin	
2006	Bratz: Forever Diamondz	Yasmin	
2007	Bratz: The Movie	Yasmin	
2007	Driver 76	Chen Chi	
2007	Pirates of the Caribbean: At World's End	Singapore Townsfolk	
2009	Indiana Jones and the Staff of Kings	Suzy Tan	
2022	Epic Seven	ae-WINTER	
