= Carter Bryant =

American designer and inventor of Bratz (b. 1969)

Carter Bryant (born 1964) is an American toy designer, artist, and inventor. He is best known for inventing the Bratz fashion doll and his previous work as a Barbie product designer for Mattel.

== Early life ==
Bryant was born in Missouri in 1964. He attended the Otis College of Art and Design in Los Angeles, but did not graduate.

== Career ==
In September 1995, Bryant was offered a position as a Barbie product designer for Mattel. He left his position with Mattel in 1998. Bryant later worked as a freelance designer, including doll design work for Ashton-Drake Galleries. During this period, Bryant stated that he found the initial inspiration for "Bratz" dolls after driving by a high school in Springfield, Missouri in 1998.

In 1999, Bryant went back to work at Mattel where he was the lead designer of a number of collectible Barbies.

Shortly thereafter, Bryant presented his "Bratz doll" concept art to MGA Entertainment. In 2000, they offered Bryant a consulting agreement and he again resigned from Mattel. In 2001, Bryant's Bratz doll line was released by MGA Entertainment. Bryant was also credited as a character writer on various Bratz projects including Bratz 4 Real, Bratz: Passion 4 Fashion - Diamondz, and Bratz the Video: Starrin' & Stylin'.

In 2013, the Pinkie Cooper "Jet Set Pets" fashion dolls were released by the Bridge Direct, which had been designed and developed by Bryant. The line included aspects of fashion play, travel, and pet collectibles. Bryant based the dolls on his sister's pet Cocker Spaniel of the same name, "Pinkie Cooper."

== Controversy ==
In 2006, Mattel sued MGA Entertainment for $500 million, alleging that Bryant was working for Mattel when he developed its original idea/concept and thus had violated his exclusivity contract. On July 17, 2008, a federal jury ruled that Bryant had created the Bratz concept while he was working for Mattel, despite MGA's claim that Bryant had never been employed by Mattel at the time and Bryant's assertion that he had designed the Bratz concepts between two separate periods of employment at Mattel. In 2009, the U.S. Court of Appeals for the Ninth Circuit ordered MGA and Mattel to resolve their dispute out of court.

== In popular culture ==
Bryant's story is featured in a 2017 episode of the Netflix documentary series, The Toys That Made Us.

As of 2023, a television series titled You Don't Own Me is in development by CBS Studios. The series will examine the parallel stories of Barbie inventor Ruth Handler and Bryant.
