= Olivia Hack =

American actress (born 1983)

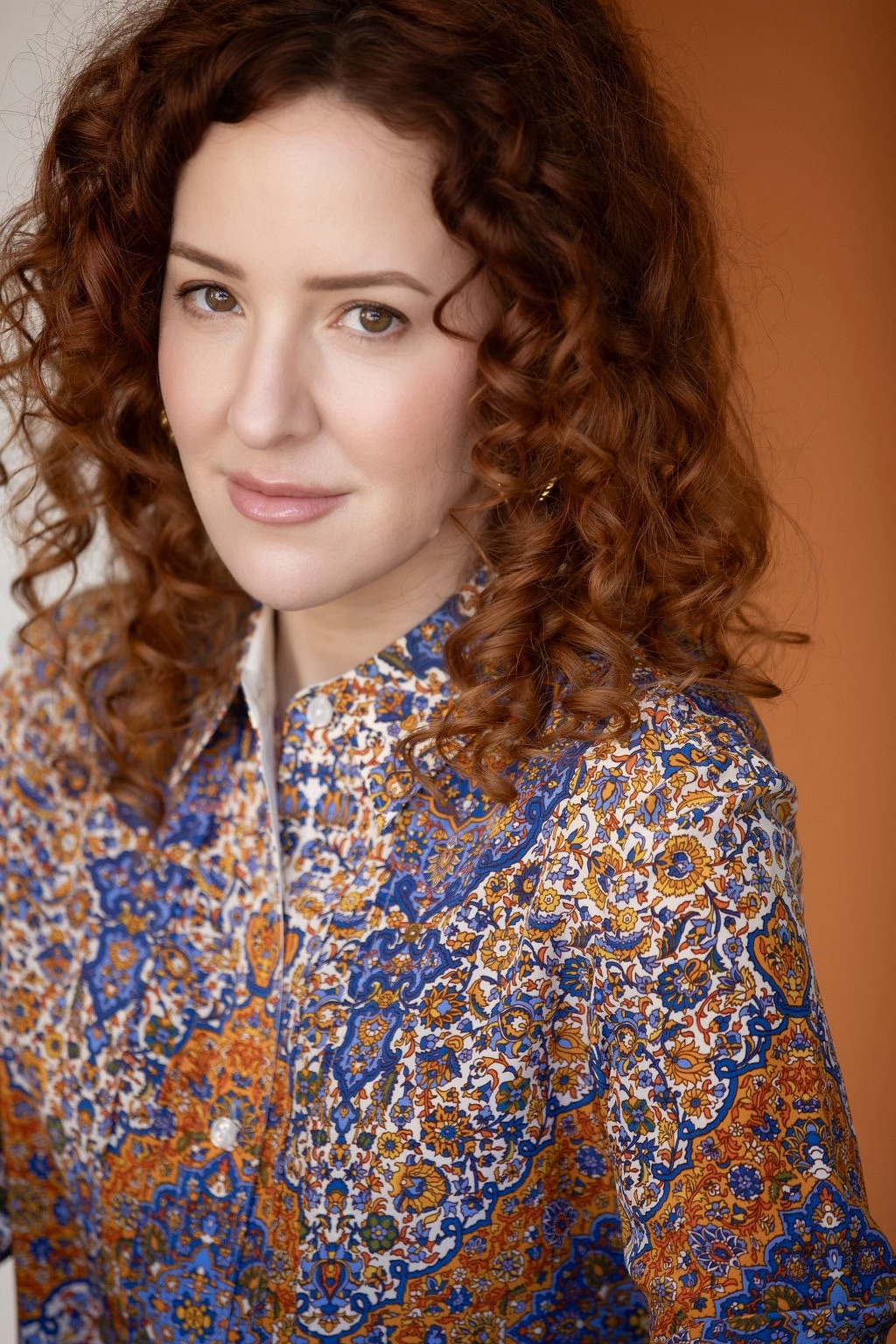
- Hack in 2026
- Born: Olivia Catherine Hack; June 16, 1983 (age 43)
- Occupation: Actress
- Years active: 1984–present

Olivia Catherine Hack (born June 16, 1983) is an American actress, best known for providing the voice of Ty Lee in Nickelodeon's Avatar: The Last Airbender and Rhonda Wellington Lloyd in Hey Arnold!. She is also known for playing Cindy Brady in the 1990s theatrical Brady Bunch films. Olivia has also done voice work for Fillmore!, Bratz as Cloe, Family Guy and Blood+. She appeared in Star Trek Generations, Party of Five and Gilmore Girls.

== Early life ==
Olivia Catherine Hack was born June 16, 1983 in Los Angeles, California. Her mother, Mea, was an actress and a playwright, and her father is an animation director. As a child actress, Hack appeared in her first commercial for Minolta when she was eight months old. She continued to work in commercials, including a series of national advertisements for McDonald's. She also sometimes worked as a child model and acted in stage plays, but she found herself drawn primarily to television and film acting.

== Career ==
Hack's first major acting roles were as Jean-Luc Picard's child in 1994's Star Trek Generations and in 1995 as Cindy Brady in The Brady Bunch Movie. Entertainment Weekly noted the authenticity of Hack's reprisal of Cindy in the 1990s Brady Bunch films, and the New York Daily News made positive comparisons of Hack's work to that of Susan Olsen's Cindy from the original television series.

In 2000 and 2001, Hack received Young Artist Awards nominations for 'Best Performance in a Voice-Over: TV/Film/Video' for her work in the series Hey Arnold!

In 2001, she played teenage M.E. on the show Any Day Now until it ended in 2002.

== Filmography ==
=== Film ===
Year	Title	Role	Notes	Ref
1994	Star Trek Generations	Picard's Kid		
1995	The Brady Bunch Movie	Cindy Brady		
1995	Napoleon	Nancy (voice)		
1996	A Very Brady Sequel	Cindy Brady		
2002	Hey Arnold!: The Movie	Rhonda Wellington Lloyd (voice)		
2002	Crayola Kids Adventures: 20,000 Leagues Under the Sea	Admiral Selling	Direct-to-video	
2004	Bratz: Starrin' & Stylin'	Cloe (voice)	Direct-to-video	
2005	Bratz: Rock Angelz	Cloe (voice)	Direct-to-video	
2006	Bratz: Genie Magic	Cloe (voice)	Direct-to-video	
2006	Bratz: Passion 4 Fashion - Diamondz	Cloe (voice)	Direct-to-video	
2008	Open Season 2	Charlene (voice)		
2010	Scooby-Doo! Abracadabra-Doo	Treena (voice)	Direct-to-video	
2013	Bratz Go to Paris - The Movie	Cloe (voice)	Direct-to-video	

=== Television ===
Year	Title	Role	Notes	Ref
1992	P.J. Sparkles	Glowee (voice)	Television special	
1993	Phenom	Jennifer	Episode: "A Lou-Daughter Picnic"	
1995	Wings	Cindy Brady	Episode: "A House to Die For"	
1995	Life with Louie	Kelly Bassett (voice)	Episode: "Lake Winnibigoshish"	
1996–2004	Hey Arnold!	Rhonda Wellington Lloyd (voice)	44 episodes	
1997	Nick Freno: Licensed Teacher	Lorrie	Episode: "My Phony Valentine"	
1997	Perversions of Science	Jenna Sorensen	Episode: "People's Choice"	
1997	Touched by an Angel	Kim	Episode: "The Pact"	
1998	Tracey Takes On...	Bethany	Episodes: "Religion", "Culture"	
1998	Party of Five	Stephanie	Episode: "Free and Clear"	
1999	Two of a Kind	Tammy	Episode: "My Boyfriend's Back"	
1999–2005	Family Guy	Cindy Brady, Melissa Rivers, Jeremy's Mom, Baby Smokes-A-Lot Toy (voice)	4 episodes	
2000	The David Cassidy Story	Young English Fan	Television film	
2000	Freaks and Geeks	Erin	Episode: "Looks and Books"	
2000	Sammy	Lola Blake (voice)	11 episodes	
2000–2001	The Kids from Room 402	Gabrielle (voice)	13 episodes	
2000–2003	Rocket Power	Shoobie, Lizzie, Swimmer (voice)	3 episodes	
2001–2002	Any Day Now	Young Mary Elizabeth "M.E." O'Brien	Main role (season 4)	
2002	Judging Amy	Jasmine Barnes	Episode: "The Bottle Show"	
2003	Fillmore!	Trace (voice)	Episode: "The Unseen Reflection"	
2003–2004	Gilmore Girls	Tanna Schrick	8 episodes	
2005	All Grown Up!	Harriet (voice)	Episode: "Wouldn't It Be Nice"	
2005	Cold Case	Tiffany	Episode: "A Perfect Day"	
2005–2006	Bratz	Cloe (voice)	Main role (season 1)	
2006–2008	Avatar: The Last Airbender	Ty Lee (voice), Additional Voices	11 episodes	
2007	Avatar: Super Deformed Shorts	Ty Lee (voice)	Short: "School Time Shipping", direct-to-video	
2011	Ben 10: Ultimate Alien	Emily (voice)	Episode: "It's Not Easy Being Gwen"	
2012	Care Bears: Welcome to Care-a-Lot	Kaylee, Hugs Bear, Best Friend Bear, Sweet Dreams Bear (voice)	3 episodes	
2012–2014	Star Wars: The Clone Wars	Katooni (voice)	5 episodes	
2015–2016	Care Bears & Cousins	Lotsa Heart (voice)	11 episodes	
2017	Hey Arnold!: The Jungle Movie	Rhonda Wellington Lloyd (voice)	Television film	
2018	Star Wars Forces of Destiny	Qi'ra (voice)	Episode: "Triplecross"	
2021	Talking Bratz	Cloe (voice)	Main role, web series	
2023	Always Bratz	Cloe (voice)	Main role, web series	

=== Anime ===
Year	Title	Role	Notes	Ref
2004–2007	Astro Boy	Princess Kāya, Penelope, Roxanne, Emily (voice)	5 episodes	
2004–2007	Mobile Suit Gundam SEED Destiny	Abbey Windsor (voice), Additional Voices	5 episodes	
2005–2006	Blood+	Mao, Irene, Female Volunteer (voice), Additional Voices	50 episodes	
2018	Dragon Pilot: Hisone and Masotan	Ms. Akishima (voice), Additional Voices	Episodes: "It Is Insane", "Kingdom of Love"	
2020	Burn the Witch	Ninny Spangcole (voice)	Anime film	
2024	Mobile Suit Gundam SEED Freedom	Abbey Windsor (voice)	Anime film	

=== Video games ===
Year	Title	Role	Notes	Ref
2003	Final Fantasy X-2	Hana (voice)		
2005	Xenosaga Episode II	Shion Uzuki (voice)		
2005	Bratz: Rock Angelz	Cloe (voice)		
2006	Bratz: Passion 4 Fashion	Cloe (voice)	Interactive DVD	
2006	Bratz: Forever Diamondz	Cloe (voice)		
2006	Bratz Babyz	Cloe (voice)		
2007	Avatar: The Last Airbender – The Burning Earth	Ty Lee (voice), Additional Voices		
2008	Avatar: The Last Airbender – Into the Inferno	Ty Lee, Fire Nation Soldier (voice)		
2009	Eat Lead: The Return of Matt Hazard	QA, Evil QA (voice)		
2011	The Sims Medieval	Sim (voice)		
2013	Lightning Returns: Final Fantasy XIII	Additional Voices		
2018	Epic Seven	Silk, Armin, Purin (voice)		
2019	Persona 5 Royal	Jose (voice)		
2022	Bratz: Flaunt Your Fashion	Cloe (voice)		
2022	Harry Potter: Magic Awakened	Lottie Turner (voice)		

== Awards and nominations ==
Award	Year	Category	Nominated Work	Result	Ref
Young Artist Awards	2000	Best Performance in a Voice-Over: Young Actress	Hey Arnold!	Nominated	
Young Artist Awards	2001	Best Performance in a Voice-Over: Young Actress	Hey Arnold!	Nominated	
