= Novi Stars =

Fashion doll line

- Type: Fashion doll
- Company: MGA Entertainment
- Country: United States
- Availability: 2012–2014
- Slogan: What on earth is going on?!
- Official website

Novi Stars was an American line of fashion dolls released by MGA Entertainment in 2012. It revolved around a set of alien girls who landed on Earth and wanted to be like humans. At the end of 2013, it was announced that no new Novi Stars would be produced. However, the last line of Novi Stars was released in fall of 2014, before the line was officially discontinued.

== History ==
Novi Stars was announced in July 2012 by MGA Entertainment deeming the dolls 'cosmic themed' and were to be shelved in the same month. Their popularity was extended through the use of releasing webisodes, showing how the main line of dolls adjusted to life on Earth. The webisodes released from 30 August-27 December 2012. Similar to Bratzillaz and Monster High webisodes, these webisodes consisted of simple plots in short-time frames. A month after the reveal of the dolls, a live-action music-video was released of actresses playing the main line of dolls. In December 2012, Novi Stars was given special promotion at the Nickelodeon SlimeFest in Australia, where makeup was done for kids and headbands were handed out to attendance.

Novi Stars was a short-lived success, ranking as a Walmart top toy only months before cancellation. The last line of dolls arrived on shelves in 2014.

== Dolls ==
The dolls were highly stylized with large heads and small torsos. They had inset eyes and fairly little articulation. Each doll had a special feature that was promoted on their box, and had a bio which revealed the details about the character. Each doll came with a pet (excluding Nita Light, who came with an energy pod) and a glow-in-the-dark doll stand. The handle from the box could become a hair band for the owner.

Most of the dolls had hair rooted in their head, with the exception of Mae Tallick, Sila Clops, Cici Thru, and Gail Lexi. The Cici Thru and Gail Lexi dolls utilized wigs. Mae Tallick and Sila Clop's wigs came off to access their battery packs. Alie Lectric, Mae Tallick, Sila Clops, and Ina Ferna required batteries.

=== Releases ===
Summer/Fall 2012:

- Basic Dolls - Alie Lectric, Una Verse, Mae Tallick and Ari Roma
- Fashion Packs - Winter Gear, Galactic Gown and Space Dreamer
- Energy Pod playset, with Nita Light doll and pet
- Secret Pet Pods (Wave 1) - Zogi, Oko, Lemi, Zero, Meba
- Glitter Lamp

Winter/Spring 2013:

- Basic Dolls - Malie Tasker, Tula Toned, Sila Clops
- Orbit Beach - Alie Lectric, Una Verse, Mae Tallick and Ari Roma
- Stellar Skinz - CiCi Thru, Gail Lexi
- Super Novas (Wave 1) - Mimi Merize, Vera Tabray
- Invasion (Wave 1) - Anne Arctic, Ina Ferna
- Curl 'n' Coil - Roe Botik, Tily Vizon

Summer/Fall 2014:

- Super Novas (Wave 2) - Doe A. Deer, Justina Hour (only released in the EU, primary Russia)
- Invasion (Wave 2) - Carmela Sweet, Frostina Sprinkles (only released in the EU, primary Russia)

=== Characters ===
- Alie Lectric - she lights up in colors and is brainy and organized. She is 200 trillion light years old and wants to teach her friends on Earth to think like a star. She blushes in different colors, and has a colorful and bold style. She can't decide what she likes best food-wise, but loves doing Earth math as she thinks it is easy. She wants to learn how to not blush around cute Earth boys, and she doesn't really get static electricity. She is preppy and typically wears ankle boots. Her pet is called Hi-Def, and her symbol is a heart.
- Una Verse - she is filled with water and glitter and is a dazzling diva. She is 4 quadrillion light years old and would like to give earth a space-age makeover. She can't keep her feet on the ground, which results in her floating; she wears glittery and trendy fashions. She loves drinking soda and likes to dress her pet in cute outfits. She wants to learn to dance without floating, and doesn't like wearing flats or tennis shoes. She is very girly and loves skirts and fancy shoes. Her pet is called Molecule, and her symbol is a planet.
- Ari Roma - she is bubblegum-scented, bubbly and caring. She is 3000 eons old and she wants to kiss an earth boy. She's an airhead (literally) and her style is light, airy and romantic. Her favorite food is pizza and she enjoys curling her hair with a curling iron (she calls it a magic wand). She would like to learn to breathe earth air so she can take her bubble off, and she doesn't really get hats. She is very sweet and loves cute shoes. Her pet is called O2, and her symbol is a star.
- Mae Tallick - she has the ability to talk in a robotic voice, but is somewhat clumsy. She is 13.7 billion years old and wants to become the biggest pop star. She is a chatterbox and her style is electrifying, shiny and metallic. She eats everything wrapped in foil, and loves to mix music like a DJ. She wants to learn to stop on her skates, and she doesn't enjoy the beach much. She typically dresses in checkered outfits. Her pet is called 8-Bit, and her symbol is a bow. Her younger sister, Meti Tallick, who is 11.4 billion years old, has a metallic (hence her name) voice modulator, thus making her voice perfect, giving her extreme singing talent. This annoys Mae, who doesn't have the best singing voice.
- Nita Light - she has a transparent body and glowing head, and is startistic and creative. She is 6000 light years old and dreams of designing Earth fashions that look good on everyone. She is brightest at night and her style is comfy and playful. She likes eating moon cake and re-energizing in her room. She wants to learn how to keep secrets, as her friends can see right through her, and she thinks floating is more comfortable than beds. She typically wears artsy outfits and accessories. Her symbol is a zig-zag.
- Malie Tasker - she has four arms that allow her to do multiple tasks at once, and is ultra-organized. The doll's arms are flexible and advertised as stretchy, although they do not stretch much. She is 11.3 billion zetaseconds old, and her mission is to give everyone a hug who needs one. Her style is super-chic, and she loves to eat peanut butter and jelly sandwiches (cut in fours—one for each hand). She is interested in gymnastics, aspires to learn juggling, but doesn't really like the fact that mittens only come in pairs. She wears a green dress and platform wedges. She has a pet called 4.0, and her symbol is a swirl similar to that of a galaxy.
- Tula Toned - she has wings and a tail, and is colorful and daring, making her somewhat of a tomboy. She is 5.5 trillion moon cycles old and wants to encourage Earth girls to show their true colors. Her fashion style is edgy with a twist. She sometimes flies off on a moments' notice. She loves to eat Neapolitan ice cream, and enjoys sightseeing, as it is easy for Tula to get around. She wants to learn to fly a plane so her wings don't get as tired, but she doesn't get why dogs chase their tails. She wears a navy dress and peep-toe booties. She has a pet called Vortex, and her symbol is the moon. The doll's legs contain two different colours of liquid.
- Sila Clops - she is a cyclops with a light-up eye, and is described as bright-eyed. She is 37'000 lunar months old and wants to light the way for her Earth friends. She always looks on the bright side, and has an intergalactic glam style. Her favorite food is carrots (as they're good for vision) and she loves to play flashlight tag. She wants to learn to wink, but she doesn't get the fear of the dark. She wears a black and silver dress and open-toe booties. She has a pet named 1-Eye, and her symbol is a spiked ring.
- CiCi Thru - she is the younger twin sister of Gail Lexi, as she is 2,700 eons old. Her personality is clearly confident, as contrast to her sister. She has twin ponytails and is see-through. Her mission is to be something new every day. She loves ice water because it is see-through. She loves to dress up, but she doesn't get blending in. She wants to learn how to high five. Her symbol is a curly line, the same as Gail.
- Gail Lexi - she is the older twin sister of CiCi Thru, as she is 3,005 eons old. Her personality is totally transparent, which presumably means "shy". She wants to teach Earth girls that they can be anything they want to be. Her fashion style changes minute to minute. She loves frozen yogurt because she can change toppings depending on her mood. She also loves playing hide and seek, but doesn't get magic tricks. She wants to learn how to stand out in a crowd. Her symbol is a curly line, the same as CiCi.
- Mimi Merize - she has a unique body with different-colored patterns and mesmerizing eyes. She has hypnotic powers; she often uses them to her own advantage, although she sometimes hypnotizes herself. Her mission is to use her hypnotic powers to reveal secrets. Her pet is named Diz. She was introduced in the Super Novas line.
- Vera Tabray - she has three eyes and boned wings. Despite her outward appearance, she has a taste for fashion and style. Sometimes, her wings flutter and cause her to fly when she is to be walking. Her mission is to teach Earth girls to fly with style. Her pet is named Fibi. She was introduced in the Super Novas line.
- Tily Vizon - she is a robot with a mechanical body and a TV for a chest. Like Roe, she enjoys styling her hair, but doesn't get hooded clothes. She loves to eat TV dinners. Her mission is to have her very own TV show on Earth. Her pet is named Telepuppy. She was introduced in the Curl N'Coil line.
- Roe Botik - like Tilly, she is a robot with a mechanical body and left eye. Her fashion style is high-voltage. She is very creative and ingenious when it comes to hairstyles and has a way with about hair. Her mission is to become a celebrity hair stylist. Her pet is named Circuit. She was introduced in the Curl N'Coil line.
- Ina Ferna - she has blazing fire on the top of her long hair. She has a fiery personality; she loves to rock hot new trends and styles, and her fashion style is "HOT! HOT!" Haute Couture. She doesn't get winter clothes; she prefers anything hot. Her symbol is a sun. She was introduced in the Novi Invasion line.
- Anne Arctic - she has blue and white hair that goes up. She has a chilly personality; she is filled with cosmic snow and is super cool, but has a warm heart. Her fashion style is frosty and shimmering, and she enjoys eating all types of ice cream. She doesn't get microwaves; warming things up is not in her interest. Her mission is to teach Earth girls how to play things cool. Her symbol is a snowflake. She was introduced in the Novi Invasion line.
- Doe A. Deer - she has lilac hair and deer-like antlers. The doll has flocked legs.
- Justina Hour - the doll has moving eyes.
- Carmela Sweet - candy-themed. The doll's legs are made of flexible 'gummy' plastic.
- Frostina Sprinkles - Is blue and has four arms, and is candy-themed. The doll's legs are hollow and filled with plastic sprinkles.
