= Moxie Girlz =

Fashion doll line

- Type: Fashion doll
- Invented by: Isaac Larian
- Company: MGA Entertainment
- Country: United States
- Availability: 2009–2014
- Materials: Plastics; Fabrics
- Slogan: Be true, be you!

Moxie Girlz were a line of fashion dolls introduced by MGA Entertainment in 2009. These dolls are targeted at girls ages 6+. The four original 10.6-inch dolls are named Lexa, Bria, Avery, and Sophina, with others named Bryten, Kellan, Monet, Merin, Ida, and Amberly.

The Moxie dolls are reminiscent of Bratz, having the distinct pop on/off feet and long hair, but with features consisting of large eyes and proportioned noses and mouths fitting to their head-size. Moxie Girlz were meant to replace Bratz, given that Mattel sued MGA over the original design. However, Bratz returned to the market in August 2010. No new products have been released since 2014.
