= Maryke Hendrikse =

Canadian voice actress (born 1979)

Marÿke Hendrikse
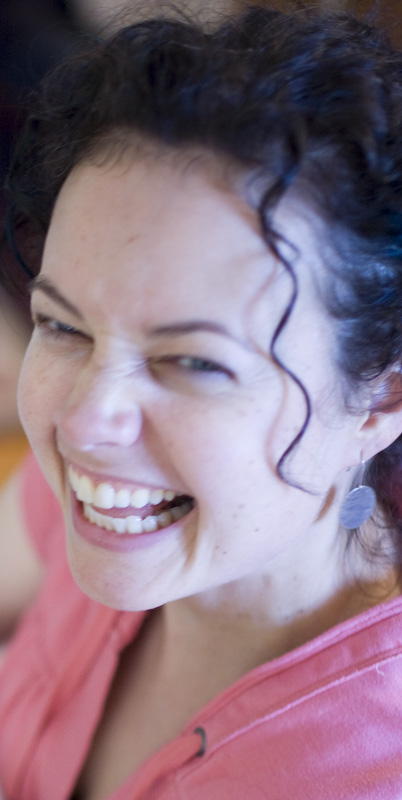
- Hendrikse in 2007
- Born: February 23, 1979 (age 47); Nassau, Bahamas
- Other name: Maryke Hendrickse
- Occupation: Voice actress
- Years active: 1990–present

Marÿke Hendrikse (/məˈreɪkə ˈhɛndrɪks/ mə-RAY-kə HEN-driks; born February 23, 1979) is a Bahamian-born Canadian voice actress. She has played several roles in anime, most notably Revy in Black Lagoon and Lunamaria Hawke in Gundam Seed Destiny. She is also known for her roles as Susan Test in Johnny Test, Gilda in My Little Pony: Friendship Is Magic, Sonata Dusk in My Little Pony: Equestria Girls and Yasmin in the Bratz franchise.

== History ==
Maryke was born in the Bahamas before she emigrated to Canada when she was 2 and a half years old, settling in Toronto. She was the first graduate from the alternative high school program Interact.

In 2008, she received the Elan Award for "Best Female Voice Over in an Animated Feature or TV Production" for her role on Johnny Test.

She graduated from Douglas College in 2010 with a Child and Youth Care diploma, having a GPA of 4.15 out of a possible 4.33 that earned her a Governor General's Bronze Medal.

== Roles ==
Anime

- Gintama° (TV) as Momochi Rappa
- Powerpuff Girls Z (TV) as Bubbles/Arturo (Weevil)
- Project ARMS as Kei Kuruma
- Black Lagoon as Revy
- Hikaru no Go (TV) as Mitani's Sister
- Inuyasha (TV) as Tsukiyomi (Episodes 139, 140)
- Mobile Suit Gundam Seed Destiny (TV) as Lunamaria Hawke
- Mobile Suit Gundam 00 as Wang Liu Mei
- Majokko Tsukune-chan (TV) as Tsukune
- MegaMan NT Warrior (TV) as Anetta
- Transformers: Cybertron (TV) as Thunderblast
- .hack//Roots (TV) as Tabby
- The Girl Who Leapt Through Time as Sekimi Nowake
- Zoids Wild as Battalia

Non-anime

- 16 Hudson as Lola
- 6teen as Hot Dog Vendor (1 episode)
- The Barefoot Bandits as Molly Moa (Canadian dub)
- Beat Bugs as Milli Pede
- The Berenstain Bears as Hillary
- Blaster's Universe as G.C.
- Braceface as Genesis
- Bratz as Yasmin (season 2)
- Chip and Potato as Mrs. Whale
- Class of the Titans as Echo (episode 1.25: "The Last Word")
- Dinosaur Train as Penelope the Protoceratops (1 episode)
- Dinotrux as Zera the Dozeratops (1 episode)
- Enchantimals as Bree Bunny, Twist Bunny
- Exchange Student Zero as Ms. Dunwall, Librarian
- George Shrinks as Helga
- The High Fructose Adventures of Annoying Orange as Little Girl, Announcer, Plane Flight Attendant, Pilot, Cabbage
- Holly Hobbie & Friends as Amy, Carrie ("Inside Out" and "Hats Off")
- Johnny Test as Susan Test, Jillian Vegan, Mrs. Crabapple, New Girl
- Johnny Test as Susan Test, Little Girl, Nurse, Scream, Local Roman, Staffer, Lucha Mom, Billy's Mom, Scream (2), Unicorn, Sad Pet Owner, Maid Marian, Boy Kid, Kid 1, Cosplay Girl, Gamer Kid, Mega Bon-Bon
- Journey to GloE as Meowskirs
- Kate & Mim-Mim as Kate and Boomer
- Lego Nexo Knights as Ava Prentis, Brickney Spears
- Lego Ninjago: Masters of Spinjitzu as Chamille
- The Little Prince as Kimi, Breeze (episodes 42-44 "La planète des Bamalias" arc)
- Littlest Pet Shop: A World of Our Own as Bree Lahuahua, Owl
- LoliRock as Debra
- Maryoku Yummy - Ooka
- Moville Mysteries as Marigold, Hannah Holston, Mirror, Betty Butterworth
- My Little Pony: Friendship Is Magic as Gilda (2 episodes, 2010 and 2015)
- My Secret Identity as Brooke (episode 2.23: More Than Meets the Eye)
- Mythic Warriors: Guardians of the Legend as 1st Village Girl (Phaeton: The Chariot of Fire)
- Pirate Express as Shelly & Shelli, Andromeda
- Polly Pocket as Pamela Pocket, Paxton Pocket, Peaches Pocket, Melody, Ms. Mense, Lindsey, Referee
- Poochini's Yard as Brenda, Additional Voices
- Rescue Heroes as Princess (1 episode)
- Rev & Roll as Bo, Townsperson #1, Avery's Mom, Little Girl, Axle Anne
- Sabrina: Secrets of a Teenage Witch as Amy, Londa
- Slugterra as Dana Por
- StarBeam as Miserable Marla
- Superbook as Charlie, Ruth, Fortune Teller
- Supernoobs as Amy Anderson, School Principal Warmerammer, Secretary Hedies, Ms. Blooth, Female Hiker, Cheerleader, Ms. Bowman, Blasteroid Representative, Old Lady, Tyler's Mom
- Sushi Pack as Hideki
- Tara Duncan as Sandra Leylocke
- Totally Spies! as Stacy, Additional Voices
- Tutenstein as Tutankhsetamun (season 2)

Movies

- Barbie & her Sisters In A Puppy Chase (2016) as Spirit
- Barbie and the Diamond Castle (2008) as Melody
- Barbie: A Fashion Fairytale (2010) as Teresa, Incidental 1
- Barbie: A Perfect Christmas (2011) as Christie Clauson, Ivy Elif
- The Barbie Diaries (2006) as Reagen
- Barbie: Dolphin Magic (2017) as Marlo
- Barbie in A Mermaid Tale (2010) as Hadley
- Barbie in A Mermaid Tale 2 (2012) as Hadley
- Barbie: Mariposa and the Fairy Princess (2013) as Princess Catania
- Betsy Bubblegum's Journey Through Yummi-Land (2007) as Taffy Taryn
- Bob's Broken Sleigh (2015) as Muffin
- Bratz Babyz Save Christmas (2008) as Yasmin
- Bratz Babyz: The Movie (2006) as Yasmin
- Bratz: Desert Jewelz (2012) as Yasmin
- Bratz Fashion Pixiez (2007) as Yasmin
- Bratz Girlz Really Rock (2008) as Yasmin
- Bratz: Pampered Petz (2010) as Yasmin
- Bratz Super Babyz (2007) as Yasmin
- My Little Pony: A Very Pony Place (2007) as Brights Brightly
- My Little Pony Crystal Princess: The Runaway Rainbow (2006) as Brights Brightly, Breezie A
- My Little Pony: Equestria Girls – Rainbow Rocks (2014) and My Little Pony: Equestria Girls – Sunset's Backstage Pass (2019) as Sonata Dusk
- Sausage Party (2016) as Popped Cherry Mixer, Plum #1, Loretta Bun, Frozen Fruitz
- The Legend of Silk Boy as Tour Guide Tammy

Video games

- Dreamfall: The Longest Journey (2006) (as Maryke Hendrickse) as Lucia the Watilla/Sam Gilmore
- Bratz Girls Really Rock (2008) as Yasmin
- Dynasty Warriors: Gundam 2 (2009) as Lunamaria Hawke
- Dynasty Warriors: Gundam 3 (2011) as Lunamaria Hawke
- Thimbleweed Park (2017) as Additional voices
- Dragalia Lost (2018) as Sarisse
