= Zapf Creation =

German toy company

MGA Zapf Creation GmbH
- Formerly: Max Zapf Puppenfabrik; Max Zapf Puppen- und Spielwarenfabrik GmbH; Zapf Creation GmbH; Zapf Creation AG
- Type: Subsidiary (GmbH)
- Industry: Toys
- Founded: 1932
- Headquarters: Rödental, Bavaria, Germany
- Area served: Worldwide
- Key people: Thomas Eichhorn
- Products: Toys
- Brands: Baby Born; Baby Annabell; Chou Chou
- Revenue: ▼€65.0 million (2022)
- Number of employees: 123 (2022)
- Parent: MGA Entertainment (2024–present)
- Website: https://www.baby-born.com/en/zapf-creation/

MGA Zapf Creation GmbH, officially trading as Zapf Creation, is a German toy company based in Rödental, Germany, which specializes in the manufacture of multi-functional baby dolls. A subsidiary of American toymaker MGA Entertainment, Zapf's franchises have become popular around the world; among its successful creations are Maggie Raggies, Baby Born, Baby Annabell, Kool Kenzie and Chou Chou.

== History ==
=== Foundation and growth before the turn of the millennium ===
Zapf Creation was founded in 1932 by Max and Rosa Zapf as Max Zapf Puppenfabrik. During World War II, doll production faced significant disruptions due to material shortages.

In 1958, Willi Zapf, the son of the company founders, and his wife Brigitte Zapf took over the company. Subsequently, they started the expansion of operations throughout Europe. Two years later, Max Zapf Puppen- und Spielwarenfabrik GmbH (Max Zapf Doll and Toy Factory) was established. With the opening of the factory, Zapf began plastic doll production to replace the use of cellulose. Zapf also sold inflatable and swimming articles at this time.

In 1980, production was moved abroad, later expanding into East Asia and commencing production in China in 1992. In 1991, the Baby Born brand was introduced, and Zapf Creation (H.K.) Ltd. was founded in Hong Kong as a subsidiary.

In 1992, MM Industrie Beteiligungs GmbH Munich acquired a majority stake in Zapf through its parent company Triumph Adler Spiel- und Freizeit Holding GmbH. The following year, a sales office was established in Spain, while Zapf dolls entered the US market in 1995. Willi Zapf left the company in 1997. In 1998, the electric functional doll Baby Annabell was introduced to the market.

=== Initial public offering and delisting ===
In 1999, the GmbH was converted into the stock corporation Zapf Creation AG and subsequently listed on the SMAX on April 26, 1999. Within the following year, subsidiaries were established in the United Kingdom (Zapf Creation (UK) Ltd.) and France (Zapf Creation (France) S.A.R.L.). Further subsidiaries in Australia, Italy and the Czech Republic followed, leading to the company's promotion to the MDAX in December 2001. The Spanish branch was also restructured into a subsidiary in 2002, and in 2003, a subsidiary was established in Poland.

Due to financial losses, the sales branch in the United States was closed in 2006. Furthermore, due to the 2008 financial crisis, Zapf encountered difficulties in extending its loans. Ultimately, shareholder loans from the main shareholder, MGA Entertainment, a US-based toy group, ensured the continuation. These loans were successively converted into equity in 2008. At that time, 66 percent of the shares were owned by MGA, or by its CEO, Isaac Larian, through various foundations.

Early in 2013, Larian reduced his shares in Zapf to between 25 and 50 percent. Following a loss of over half of the company's capital stock, the company's annual general meeting on July 3, 2013, sanctioned a capital reduction, merging shares in a 3:1 ratio. In October 2018, the company decided to delist from the Baden-Württemberg Stock Exchange. The share has been unlisted since then.

=== Renewed growth ===
Starting in 2018, the company's business developed positively again, except for the UK. This development was mainly achieved by streamlining the product range. In addition, the company's major shareholder, Larian, promoted innovations within the company and focused business operations on the German and UK markets.

On October 9, 2023, it was announced that Zapf would merge with longtime partner MGA Entertainment. The deal closed at the end of Spring 2024, and Zapf Creation AG was renamed to MGA Zapf Creation GmbH on July 16, 2024.

== Company ==
Zapf Creation consists of the holding company Zapf Creation AG and its subsidiaries. These subsidiaries are responsible for the marketing and distribution of the dolls. For this purpose, Zapf Creation maintains subsidiaries in the UK, Hong Kong and Spain (2022). Additionally, since 2007, Zapf Creation has a strategic cooperation with the US toy manufacturer MGA Entertainment, Inc., based in Chatsworth, California.

Zapf Creation AG is based in Rödental, near Coburg, Germany. It develops, manufactures and sells multi-functional dolls in 65 countries worldwide. The products are primarily aimed at girls between the ages of two and eight. The company's two most known product lines are Baby Born and Baby Annabell; these doll models generate 90 percent of sales. In 2022, Zapf Creation AG generated revenues of €58.52 million and employed 123 people.

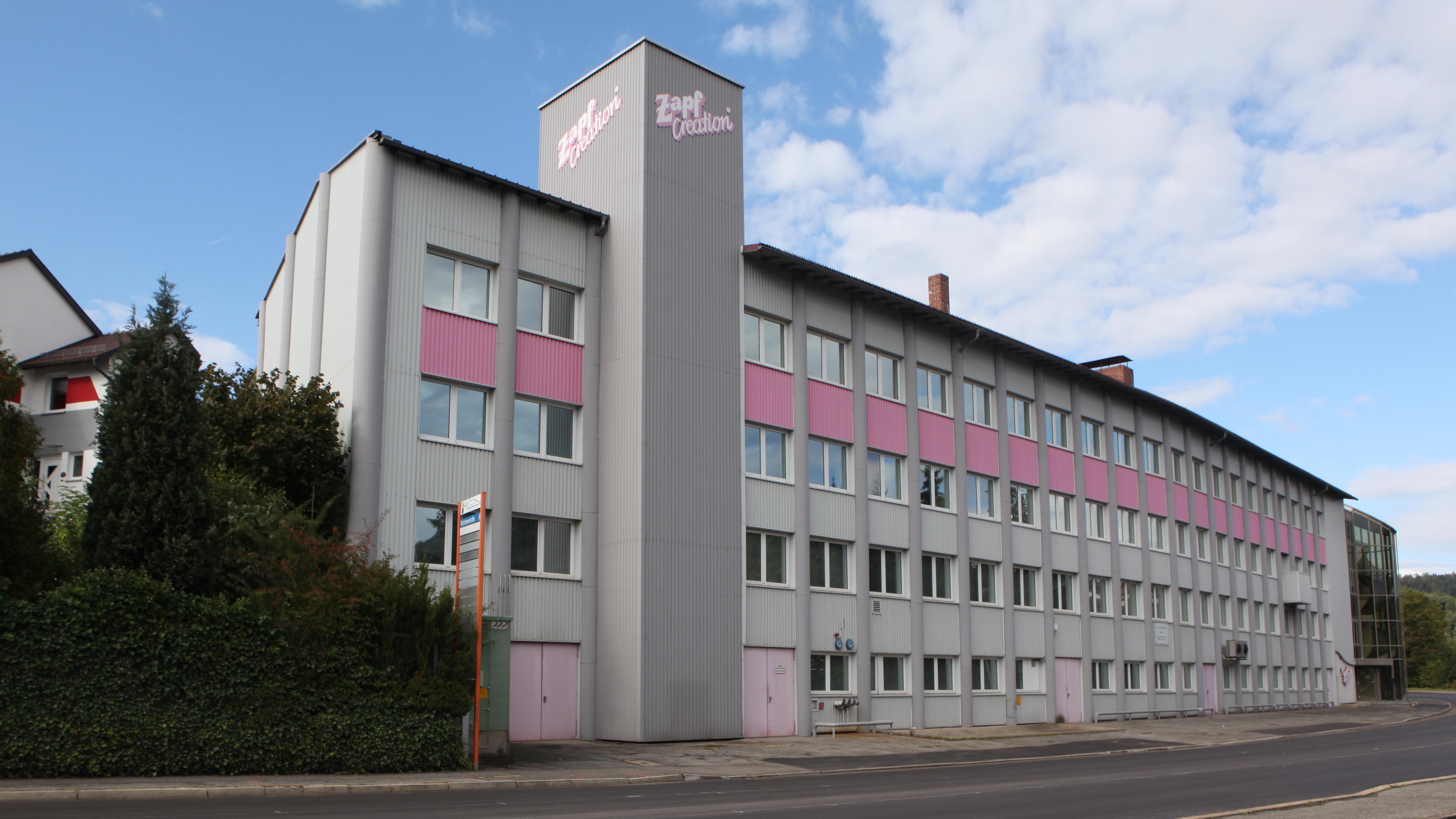
The Zapf Creation Building, Rödental, Germany

== Products ==
Most of the Zapf Creation products are baby and toddler dolls, occasionally used as instructional toys to teach necessary skills to future parents. The most prominent lines include Baby Born, Baby Annabell, and Chou Chou.

In addition, there is a "Baby Born App" developed by Zapf and Blue Ocean Entertainment, in which users can play mini-games in a dollhouse. Since July 2023, Zapf has also been broadcasting an animated series titled "Baby Born: The Animated Series" on the video platform YouTube and the channel Kidoodle.TV. The series was developed in collaboration with MGA Entertainment and was first broadcast in January 2024.

=== Baby Born ===
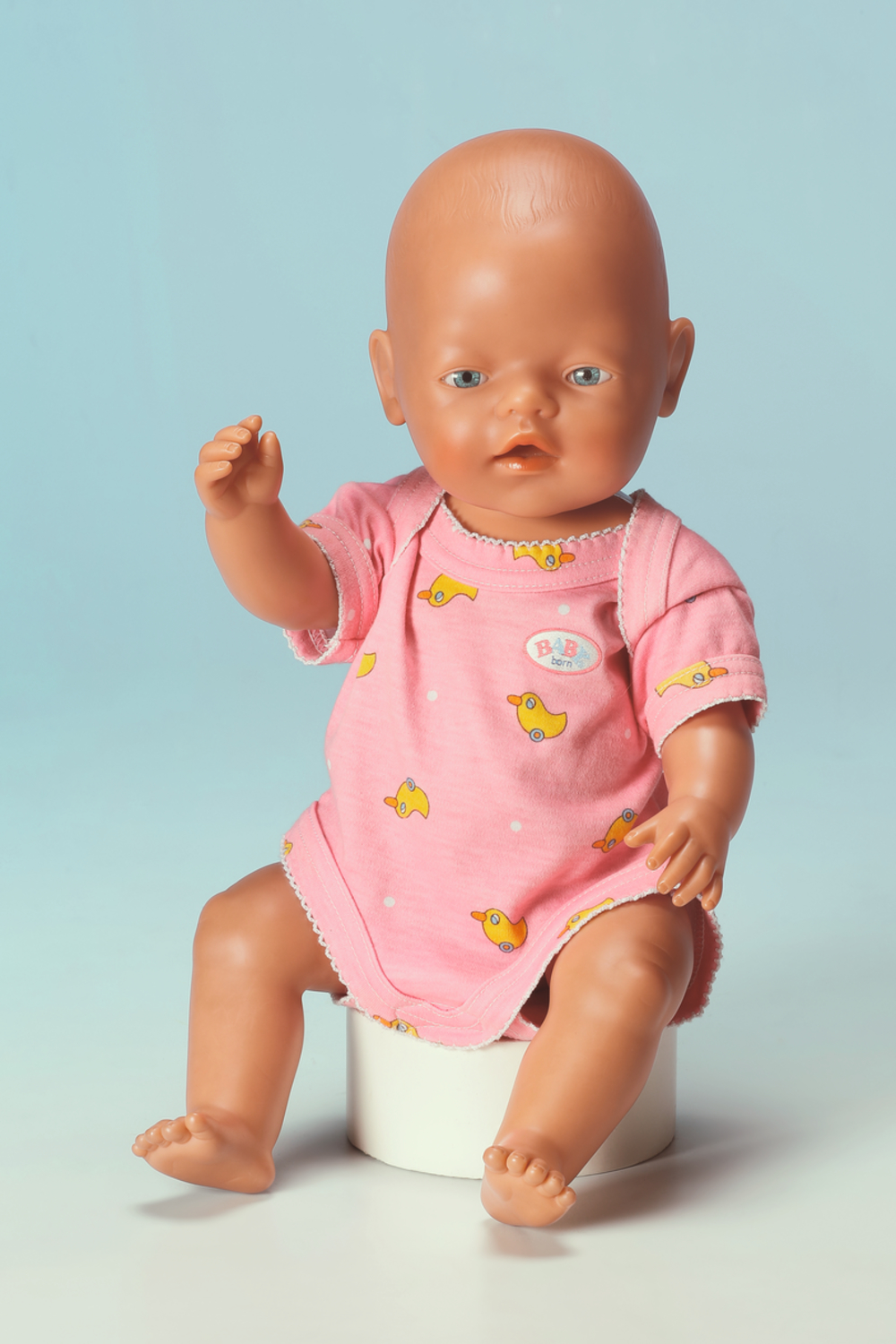
1991 Baby Born doll

Baby Born (introduced in 1991) is often considered to be the most lifelike of the series due to the numerous functions that the doll can perform. These include crying, urinating, using a potty and being quietened by a pacifier which makes the doll's eyes shut in later versions. All these actions can be performed without the use of batteries, which makes it possible to bathe the doll. The most recent version includes nine functions and eleven accessories.

Varieties of this model include boy and girl, as well as white and black skin tones, while the boy dolls are anatomically correct. Initial models have the doll cry when the right arm is pressed as well as a squeaker in the left arm, which was removed in later versions. Since 2006, Baby Born dolls have functional eyes instead of moulded ones, allowing the doll to close its eyes when the dummy is placed in its mouth.

In 2018, the doll was remodeled as a "Soft Touch" with a softer plastic body, while retaining the same functionality as previous models. In 2024, the dolls are instead modeled on the characters from Baby Born: The Animated Series, Emma, Eva and Jonas.

=== Baby Annabell ===
Baby Annabell (introduced in 1998) is perhaps the most famous of Zapf's products. Baby Annabell is a battery-operated doll that comes with a variety of accessories and an additional product line including supplementary articles, outfits, and pieces of furniture. Unlike Baby Born, Baby Annabell's body is made out of soft, plush-like material that contains the doll's battery box. This doll could be classed as a "modern autonomous doll". Older versions of the doll were also able to recognize sounds (e.g., a rattle or the owner's voice) and would cry in response to noise when sleeping.

Similar to Baby Born, Baby Annabell is available as a girl or boy as well as in two different skin tones. The initial version (and the 2019-2022 version) does not have any electronics in its head, as they were only introduced with the Interactive version in 2002 alongside a darker-skinned version. Annabell dolls from 2005 to 2018 had a water tank, allowing the doll to simulate drinking water and crying tears, with the 2016-2018 version having the ability to urinate on the potty.

Other dolls in the range include My First Baby Annabell, which is a simple play doll that does not run on batteries.

Since 2026, the Baby Annabell brand has been merged into the Baby Born brand.

=== Chou Chou ===
Chou Chou is designed to be very realistic and includes accessories to support role playing for children. Chou Chou is sometimes used to teach young girls, in particular, about various stages of a baby's life, including the first tooth and minor ailments, though most dolls are just for playing. This doll comes in a variety of types and has many lifelike functions.

Examples of products from the range include Rock A Bye Chou Chou, which was named the number one doll in the Duracell Kids' Choice Toy Survey in the US in 2001, and Chou Chou Learn to Walk, which teaches the need for a baby when they begin crawling or walking.

=== Other dolls ===
- Annabell Tween: A line of roleplay dolls comes in various versions with different outfits. They are aimed toward older girls.
- Sam and Sally: These are dolls representing twins. They are quite large at around 63 cm (25 in) each (similar to other dolls of their size), which means that they can either be dressed in the provided outfits or in real baby clothes in sizes for 0–3 months and 3–6 months.
- Baby Lou: A line of dolls from the early-mid 1990's.
- Disney Little Princesses: Based on the Disney Princess brand, this range features various Disney characters depicted in Zapf's traditional doll style. They have poseable arms, legs and heads.
- Heidi: Based on the TV series of the same name, this line includes dolls representing Heidi and her friends. They are made from fabric and plush and can be hand washed.
- Dolly Moda: This line offers clothes for the dolls in different sizes. The clothes can be worn by dolls of different sizes.
- Maggie Raggies: A cloth doll with a flexible wire frame inside.
- Furthermore, Zapf Creation distributed dolls such as "Jolina Ballerina", "Hexe Lilli" (Lilli the Witch) or "Little Sunshine".

== Sustainability ==
Zapf is a co-founder of the Fair Toys organization, which promotes the responsible and sustainable production of toys. The organization also conducts examinations to ensure that toys are manufactured under equitable and health-conscious working conditions. When this can be substantiated, Fair Toys awards the "Fair Toys Seal" as a recognition of compliance with these standards.

Since spring 2021, Zapf Creation has been gradually converting its product range to plastic-free packaging. All new products are launched in closed boxes which do not include plastic blisters, fasteners, or windows anymore.
