= Bratz Babyz =

Sub-brand of a toyline

As a subset of the Bratz line, in which all of the dolls are at infant age, it was titled under the brand name Bratz Babyz. The brand is split into two lines, the regular Bratz Babyz and the Bratz Big Babyz.

== Bratz Babyz ==
In 2004, the first Bratz Babyz were made. The babyz were "Cloe", "Sasha", "Jade" and "Yasmin" (the first Bratz.) The dolls came with a changing bag, a nap blanket, bottle on a chain and a pet based on the girl's nickname (e.g. Sasha's nickname is Bunny Boo, so she has a bunny.) Later on, in 2005, "Meygan", "Fianna", "Cameron" and "Dana" joined the Bratz Babyz group.

Also, in 2005, they released the 'Hair Flair' collection. Instead of having plastic hair, the dolls had fiber hair like regular Bratz dolls.

=== Bratz Big Babyz ===
Soon after, they made Bratz Big Babyz; dolls approximately five times the size of regular Babyz dolls. In 2006, the Bratz Big Babyz Bubble Trouble Dolls appeared. These dolls laughed, burped, and blew bubbles when you fed them soda. Six months after the Bratz Babyz Hair Flair, the Big Babyz had their own realistic hair version released; the "Bratz Big Babyz Hair Flair".

=== Bratz Lil' Angelz ===
The Bratz Lil' Angelz are newborn babyz with different mouths then other bratz. They have a smile line and thin lips. They each come with newborn pets, and are numbered in a collection of dolls. They also came out at first with molded hair.

Secret Surprise dolls - Lil' Angelz came out with Secret Surprise dolls (dolls with hoodies). They could either be a boy or girl.

Heavenly Hair - Bratz Lil' Angelz came out with Heavenly Hair Dolls, which have the regular hair.

Tiny Tinklez - Bratz lil' angelz which urinate when given water. They come with two pets, which can also drink and urinate.

=== Alleged profanity ===
On Christmas Day 2006, Miami resident Kristina Acre received the Singing Jade doll as a gift. According to her father, Luis Acre, Kristina told him that the doll was saying "lots of bad words". According to Luis Acre these include "the f and b words". Later, MGA Entertainment responded on their website about the report. The lyrics—which do not contain profanity—are posted on the Bratz.com website in the Videos & Music section under Bratz Babyz The Movie - Music.

== Bratz Babyz: The Movie (2006) ==
Bratz Babyz: The Movie
- Directed by: Davis Doi
- Written by: John Doolitle
- Starring: Ashleigh Ball; Kathleen Barr; Lisa Ann Beley; Alex Carter; Ian James Corlett; Brian Drummond; Maryke Hendrikse; Britt McKillip; Kelly Sheridan; Chantal Strand; Sam Vincent
- Edited by: Bruce W. Cathcart
- Music by: Matthew Gerrard
- Production companies: MGA Entertainment; Sabella Dern Entertainment
- Distributed by: 20th Century Fox Home Entertainment
- Release date: September 12, 2006
- Running time: 66 minutes
- Country: United States
- Language: English

In September 2006, Bratz Babyz: The Movie was released on DVD by 20th Century Fox Home Entertainment. It was later re-released by Lionsgate Home Entertainment.

=== Plot ===
Nita and Nora—who were Twiinz—get ready to join Cloe, Jade, Sasha and Yasmin at the daycare center—which was located at the mall. Snappy, Nita's puppy, jumps into Nora's bag when no one's looking, and Nora, hurrying to keep up with Nita, rushes out without knowing Snappy is in her bag. Once at the daycare center Snappy gets out and escapes into the mall. They also try to escape and find Snappy—being dog-napped by Duane, the bully at the mall. He demands $50 from the Bratz Babyz as a ransom for the dog. Having their ideas were different, and Jade, Cloe and Nora try to get Snappy back one way, while Sasha, Yasmin and Nita try to get her back another. When time starts to run out, they decide the only way to get $50 is for Nora to win it in the karaoke contest. They learn to team up and overcome the bully and get the puppy back.

=== Characters ===
- Cloe (Angel) - She has a pet winged piglet.
- Jade (Kool Kat) - She has a pet kitty.
- Yasmin (Pretty Princess) - She has a pet frog.
- Sasha (Bunny Boo) - She has a pet bunny.
- Nora (Kitten) - Nita's twin.
- Nita (Puppy) - Nora's twin.
- Cameron - The only one of the Baby Boyz line to appear in the film.
- Harvey - Cameron's best friend.
- Ms. Calabash - Ms. Calabash is in charge of the Daycare.
- Duane - The main antagonist who steals Snappy and demands a $50 ransom payment from the Babyz.

=== Songs ===
- Theme from "Bratz Babyz"
- Catch Me If You Can
- We Can Do It
- Ready or Not
- All Together

== Bratz: Super Babyz (2007) ==
Bratz: Super Babyz
- Directed by: Mucci Fassett
- Written by: John Doolittle
- Produced by: Bill Schultz
- Starring: Britt Irvin; Britt McKillip; Dorla Bell; Maryke Hendrikse; Betty Phillips; Jan Rabson; Sam Vincent; Cathy Weseluck; Jay Brazeau
- Music by: Matthew Gerrard
- Production companies: MGA Entertainment; Mike Young Productions
- Distributed by: Lionsgate Home Entertainment
- Release date: October 9, 2007
- Running time: 73 minutes
- Country: United States

Bratz: Super Babyz is the second Bratz Babyz film released during the Autumn of 2007. The film was also released as the toy line, while video game adaptions are released for Nintendo DS and PC.

=== Plot ===
The Babyz dream to be like their favorite superheroes. When the Babyz go to a super-hero theme park, their babysitter, Gran, buys them an alien matter exchanger, thinking it's a toy. With the help of the matter exchanger, the Babyz wake up with superpowers—known for do good deeds by getting a cat down from a tree, saving two kids from a bully and preventing a bus from falling off a cliff. But the four aliens want their matter exchanger back, and kidnap Sasha. The Babyz save her, but they lose their powers and get locked in the aliens' spaceship, while the aliens change into human Babyz and take place. Sasha, Jade, Cloe and Yasmin must take on the aliens as regular Babyz.

=== Characters ===
- Cloe (Seireena), voiced by Britt McKillip
- Jade (Glue Girl), voiced by Britt Irvin
- Sasha (Smartasha), voiced by Dorla Bell
- Yasmin (Speedy Princess), voiced by Maryke Hendrikse
- Gran, voiced by Betty Phillips
- Tuber, voiced by Jan Rabson
- Tater Tot, voiced by Sam Vincent
- Yam, voiced by Cathy Weseluck
- Spud, voiced by Jay Brazeau

=== Songs ===
- "Look At Us Now"
- "Time To Take A Stand"
- "It's Up To Me And You"
- "Feel The Power"

== Bratz Babyz: Save Christmas (2008) ==
Bratz Babyz: Save Christmas
- Directed by: Mucci Fassett; Phil Weinstein
- Written by: Karl Geurs
- Produced by: Ciara Anderson; Isaac Larian; Bill Schultz; Liz Young; Mike Young
- Music by: Matthew Gerrard
- Production companies: MGA Entertainment; Mike Young Productions
- Distributed by: Lionsgate Home Entertainment
- Release date: November 5, 2008
- Running time: 74 minutes
- Country: United States
- Language: English

Bratz Babyz: Save Christmas is the third and final Bratz Babyz film released in Fall of 2008 as a Christmas theme film. It was produced by MGA Entertainment and Mike Young Productions and was released by Lionsgate.

=== Plot ===
The Babyz are excited to celebrate Christmas with their parents.

=== Characters ===
- Cloe, voiced by Britt McKillip
- Jade, voiced by Britt Irvin
- Sasha, voiced by Dorla Bell
- Yasmin, voiced by Maryke Hendrikse
- Max, voiced by Peter Kelamis
- Gran, voiced by Betty Phillips
- William, voiced by Dylan Lamoureux
- Ralphie, voiced by Jay Brazeau
- Reggie, voiced by Laurie Brunetti
- Zachary, voiced by Qayam Devji
- Yasmin's Mom, voiced by Nicole Oliver
- Head Elf, voiced by Andrew Toth
- Milly, voiced by Marcy Goldberg

=== Songs ===
- "You've Got Your Friends"
- "Help is on the way"
- "Feel the Magic"

== Video games ==
- Bratz Babyz (PC/GBA)
- Bratz Super Babyz (DS/PC)

== See also ==
- List of Bratz characters
