= Bratz (web series) =

- Country of origin: United States
- Original language: English
- No. of seasons: 1
- No. of episodes: 10

Production
- Running time: 1-2 mins
- Production companies: MGA Entertainment; Stoopid Buddy Studios

Original release
- Network: Television: Kabillion, Netflix; Web: YouTube/Official site
- Release: July 27 – October 28, 2015

Related
- Bratzillaz

Bratz (also known as Bratz: C.I.Y. Shoppe Webseries) is a stop-motion animated web series, based on a line of toy dolls of the same name. It is produced by MGA Entertainment, and premiered on the Bratz YouTube channel.

== Background ==
In August 2015, a new stop-motion animated web series premiered on YouTube. MGAE confirmed there would be 10 episodes for the first season.

== Characters ==
- Cloe (Angel) (voiced by Melissa Goodwin Shepherd) She is one of the five main Bratz, who appear in the majority of the doll lines. Blonde hair, blue eyes, light skin tone.
- Jade (Kool Kat) (voiced by Fryda Wolff) is one of the five main Bratz, who appear in the majority of the doll lines. Light skin tone, black hair, brown and sometimes hazel/green eyes.
- Yasmin (Pretty Princess) (voiced by Heidi Gardner) She is one of the five main Bratz, who appear in the majority of the doll lines. Beauty mark underneath her left eye, brown eyes, tan skin tone, brown hair.
- Sasha (Bunny Boo) (voiced by Shondalia White) She is one of the five main Bratz, who appear in the majority of the doll lines. Green eyes, dark skin tone, dark brown hair.
- Raya (Sun Rayz) (voiced by Melanie Minichino) Light blue eyes, tan skin tone, blonde hair. Introduced in July 2015 as the fifth main character.

== Episodes ==
No.	Title	Original release date
0	"Meet The Bratz"	July 16, 2015
What happens when Bratz and stop motion collide? A super fun web series from @StoopidBuddyStoodios! Get ready for fun and adventures with all 5 Bratz, coming soon!
1	"Selfie"	July 27, 2015
The Bratz: Cloe, Jade, Sasha, Yasmin and Raya are pack a design a photobooth to take better selfies.
2	"Skate or Chick"	August 3, 2015
Cloe and Yasmin decide to build a chicken coop in the garden, but Jade also planned to build a half-pipe in the garden.
3	"Cupcake Crash"	August 13, 2015
Sasha helps Cloe get over her addiction with a new video game app.
4	"Bunny vs. Cat"	August 18, 2015
Jade and Sasha get into a competition to see which of their pets will attract more customers to the C.I.Y. Shoppe.
5	"What's Your Zen?"	August 26, 2015
Yasmin helps Jade find her zen when she cannot seem to focus on her tasks.
6	"If the Shoefie Fits"	September 2, 2015
Raya starts a new trend when she goes to class wearing two different shoes.
7	"Put Your Thinking Crown On!"	September 16, 2015
The Bratz pack each use their "thinking crowns" to help Sasha come up with something to wear for the talent show.
8	"Blackout Campout"	September 30, 2015
The Bratz pack help Jade overcome her fear of the dark when the power goes out.
9	"Snow In Love"	October 14, 2015
Yasmin and the Bratz pack help cheer up Raya after coming back from a fun ski trip.
10	"Behind the Scenes"	October 28, 2015
The Bratz pack create a commercial to advertise the C.I.Y. Shoppe.
