= Bratzillaz =

American line of fashion dolls

Bratzillaz (House of Witchez)
- Type: Fashion doll, Web series, Magical girl
- Company: MGA Entertainment
- Country: United States
- Availability: June 2012–July 2013
- Slogan: "Glam Gets Wicked"
- Official website

Bratzillaz (House of Witchez) was an American line of fashion dolls released by MGA Entertainment in 2012. The line was a spin-off of the company's popular franchise Bratz. Bratzillaz characters are witches with unique special powers, many of whom have a similar name to an existing Bratz character. The dolls were rebranded to House of Witchez in Summer 2013 with the release of the final set of dolls, and then discontinued. The official website was removed in 2016.

== Dolls ==
Each doll (with the exception of the Core (Basic Line) dolls) has glass eyes with an articulated, posable body. The dolls come with a broom hair brush, and some come with a spell scroll and a doll stand. Some have a unique pet, sold separately (Although they were also boxes sold that contained both doll and pet, for a limited time) and most have a personal witch mark symbol 'tattoo'. Character cards come with the first edition dolls. They reveal augmented reality content when held up to a webcam: virtual doll animation and a character video. The Core (Basic Line) dolls are part of an inexpensive budget line and have a non-articulated body and painted eyes as opposed to the usual glass eyes.

=== Releases ===
Summer/Fall 2012

- First Edition (Basic Line) - Yasmina Clairvoya, Meygana Broomstix, Sashabella Paws, Cloetta Spelletta, and Jade J'Adore
- Pets - Winkers, Wingzy, Fluffinscruff, Barkthalameow, and Kissifuss
- Fashion Packs - Midnight Magic, Changed-Up Chic, Blood Red Charm, Romantic Spell, and True Blue Style
- Accessory Packs - Academy Style, Wicked Night Out, and Charmed Life
- Cafe Zap Playset
- Magic Fortune Crystal Ball
- Secret Message Pad

Winter/Spring 2013

- Midnight Beach - Yasmina, Meygana, Sashabella, Cloetta, Jade, and Fianna Fins - All dolls in this line have glow-in-the-dark, pale skin.
- Magic Night Out - Yasmina, Meygana, Sashabella, Cloetta, Jade, and Vampelina
- Core (Basic Line) - Yasmina, Meygana, Sashabella, Cloetta, and Jade.
- Switch-A-Witch Wave 1 - Single Pack and Double Pack
- Switch-A-Witch Wave 2 - Single Pack and Double Pack
- Pets - Ripple and Batric
- Witchy Makeover - Yasmina

Summer/Fall 2013

- Back to Magic - Meygana, Sashabella, Jade, Victoria Antique, and Illiana Honesty
- Witchy Princesses - Angelica Sound, Siernna Calmer, and Carolina Past
- Core (Basic Line) - Meygana and Jade.

== Website and media ==
The official Bratzillaz website has launched in July 2012. The website included character bios, parallax scrolling, and games. In a first for MGA Entertainment, Bratzillaz games are available on apps for smartphones. This is closed in 2016.

=== Webisodes ===
Bratzillaz
- Also known as: Bratzillaz
- Genre: Fantasy, Adventure
- Country of origin: United States
- Original language: English
- No. of seasons: 1
- No. of episodes: 10

Production
- Running time: 1-3 mins
- Production company: MGA Entertainment

Original release
- Network: Television: Kabillion Web: YouTube/Official site
- Release: August 15, 2012 – July 22, 2013

Related
- Bratz; Bratz: C.I.Y. Shoppe Webseries

On July 13, 2012, the official theme song for the dolls is revealed in a live-action music video, which was shot at the Canfield-Moreno Estate. In August, MGA released the first Bratzillaz webisode to the official website and YouTube channel. A second webisode is released weeks later on September 11, 2012. The first season was aired until January 4, 2013. A second season is expected to be released due to a leaked unreleased webisode titled "Fashion Bites" and parts of it being featured at the end of "Midnight Beach" when Yasmina looks into the future. However, due to MGA taking a hiatus with the Bratz line in 2014 to rebuild the brand, production of the dolls ended and a second season is no longer completed.

From June 24, 2013, to July 22, 2013, there had been a short series of videos about the Witchy Princesses titled "Witchy Princesses Adventure" which is no longer considered part of the webisode series.

No.	Title	Original release date	US viewers (millions)
1	"Welcome To Bratzillaz Academy!"	August 15, 2012	1.88
The Bratzillaz first arrive at the Bratzillaz Academy, meet Headmistress Magika, and are given capes that give them their own special powers.
2	"Furry Frenzy"	September 11, 2012	0.96
The Bratzillaz meet Levitor and are each given their own pet.
3	"Double Trouble"	September 25, 2012	1.01
The Bratzillaz meet the Toola Twins and prepare to head off to their first class, Purses and Potions.
4	"Pur-Fecting Boy Chat"	October 9, 2012	0.61
The Bratzillaz help prepare Sashabella Paws for her first video chat with her crush, Igneus, as she is very nervous.
5	"The Rrr-runway"	October 24, 2012	0.76
The Bratzillaz pets star in their very own fashion show after they feel left out of seeing the Bratzillaz have one.
6	"In the Big Screen"	November 7, 2012	0.42
The Bratzillaz sneak into see Jade J'Adore's favorite movie, but ruin it for her and make it up by sending her into the movie.
7	"Later, Alligator"	November 20, 2012	0.36
The Bratzillaz have to magically create an Alligator purse in Purses and Potions, and quickly try to fix things when they go wrong.
8	"Headlines and Deadlines"	December 11, 2012	0.62
The Bratzillaz try to figure out how the Toola Twins always seem to beat Levitor in submitting breaking news into the school paper.
9	"Midnight Beach"	January 4, 2013	1.25
The Bratzillaz are given help from Vampelina and Fianna Fins to find Cloetta Spelletta's pet, Barkthalameow, when they lose him at the Midnight Beach.
10	"Fashion Bites"	Unreleased	N/A
The Bratzillaz have a competition at Gloomingdale's to see who can find the best purchase.

=== Witchy Princesses Adventure ===
- "Week One" (June 24, 2013) The Bratzillaz seek for information about the Witchy Princesses after Sashabella hears the three birds of the three Princesses crying.
- "Week Two" (July 1, 2013) The Bratzillaz seek to find a book about the Witchy Princesses, only to find this is the missing pages.
- "Week Three" (July 8, 2013) The Bratzillaz look for two of the pages in Café Zap and in the Toola Twins' room.
- "Week Four" (July 15, 2013) The Bratzillaz look for the third missing page by finally restoring a book.
- "Week Five" (July 22, 2013) The Bratzillaz can repair a book to only discover what was meant to also happen to the Witchy Princesses.

== Characters ==
=== Bratzillaz ===
The Bratzillaz are the witch cousins of the Bratz, according to the Bratzillaz theme song. According to the song, this is revealed that all of the Bratzillaz found out their witchy identities at age 16. Yasmina Clairvoya is assumed to be the cousin of Yasmin, Cloetta Spelletta is Cloe's cousin; Meygana Broomstix is Meygan's cousin (Though Meygan was no longer the main character in the Bratz franchise); also Sashabella Paws is the Bratz' Sasha's cousin though Sashabella is nicknamed "Sasha", which is her human cousin's name, by Cloetta in the episode "Pur-Fecting Boy Chat". Also Jade J'Adore is the cousin of Jade, having the same first name as Jade, her cousin. The others are original characters with only Fianna being based on another Brat. Vampelina, Victoria Antique, Illiana Honestly, and Angelica Sound are all original characters. Each Bratzilla has a witch's birthmark known as a "witchmark".

Unlike the original Bratz, the Bratzillaz all have revealed last names.

None of them are the cousins of the Bratz shown in the Bratz television series: the franchise about a magazine; though the webisodes of Bratzillaz (House of Witchez) do have a pair of evil blond female twins.

==== Main Bratzillaz ====
Cloetta Spelletta - (similar to Cloe): Cloetta and her mixed up cat/dog pet, Barkthalameow, has the power to change people into anything they want. She adores two-tone fashions, over-the-knee boots, sparkly capes and hair that goes straight and curly. She loves looks in two-sided colors. Her witchmark is a moon & stars, and her colors are pink and black. She has heterochromia. Cloetta's family name "Spelletta" is a play on the word "spell" referring to her metamorphosis magic. Introduced in the Summer/Fall 2012 First Edition basic line as one of the core five girls. She is Cloe's cousin.

Yasmina Clairvoya - (similar to Yasmin): Yasmina has the power to see the future. She loves vintage romantic looks, retro style and funky braided hair. With her spellbinding style and oddball pet, Winkers, she stands out as a unique individual. Her witchmark is an Egyptian eye, and her color is purple. She is very dedicated to always having good fashion, as in the web series for the webisode: "Rrr-runway", when Sashabella said: "Exactly. Imagine how you would feel if you had no stylish clothes", Yasmina responded with: "Are you trying to give me nightmares?" Yasmina's surname "Clairvoya" is a pun on the word "clairvoyant", referring to her witch power to predict the future. Introduced in the Summer/Fall 2012 First Edition basic line as one of the core five girls. She is Yasmin's cousin.

Jade J'Adore - (similar to Jade): Jade loves everything about love. With her devilish pet love monster, Kissifuss, by her side, she has the power to heal a broken heart. She loves punky glam looks, luxurious lace, mysterious eyes and hearts on everything. She also loves urban witchy looks. Her witchmark is a heart arrow, and her color is red. Jade's surname is a pun on the French word "j'adore" which can mean "I love it" or "I adore it." Introduced in the Summer/Fall 2012 First Edition basic line as one of the core five girls. She is Jade's cousin.

Sashabella Paws - (similar to Sasha): Sashabella has the animal kingdom under her spell; she can communicate with creatures everywhere. Her favorite animal to talk to is her pet furball, Fluffinscruff. She loves mixing up faux fur with fuzzy boots. She also loves other fur clothing. Her witchmark is a tribal cat, and her color is light green. Her last name is a pun on the fact that her ability is "animal chat". Introduced in the Summer/Fall 2012 First Edition basic line as one of the core five girls. She is Sasha's cousin.

Meygana Broomstix - (similar to Meygan): Meygana and her winged pet, Wingzy, not only have the power to fly, but still make dreams come true also. She loves all shades of the blue sky, late night parties, cloud hopping, fluttery capes and helping people's wildest dreams take flight. She loves sporty supernatural looks. Her witchmark is a pair of wings, and her color is blue. Meygana's last name "Broomstix" refers to how in traditional witch folklore or stereotypes of witches float on a broomstick. The name is a reference to the term "broomsticks", which is also referring to her ability to "make dreams take flight". Even Meygana's ditzy and free-spirited personality represents her power. Introduced in the Summer/Fall 2012 First Edition basic line as one of the core five girls. She is Meygan's cousin.

==== Other Bratzillaz ====
The minor characters who can be also called "Bratzillaz" consist of witches with surnames based on their powers. The only one who is not a witch is Vampelina, being a vampiress, or at least being a vampiric witch. Their abilities are linked in their names. While Vampelina can see in the dark because she is a vampire, the other minor Bratzillaz have abilities that only a solid witch would have. Fianna is a "sea witch": similar to a mermaid but is not exactly a mermaid. Vampelina was shown to be a friend of Jade in "Midnight Beach". All of them have personalities that match up with their abilities and their surnames.

Fianna Fins - (similar to Fianna): Fianna is a sea witch who has the power to control weather. Her pet is Ripple. Her witchmark is a mermaid tail. Introduced in the Winter/Spring 2013 Midnight Beach line. Her human cousin is Fianna.

Vampelina - Vampelina is a vampiress who has the power to see in the dark. Her pet is Batric. Her witchmark is a pair of fangs. Introduced in the Winter/Spring 2013 Magic Night Out line.

Victoria Antique - Victoria is an exchange student from China who has the power to turn old things back to new. Being from the country of China may or may not be a nod to her ability to fix old things, since some people in real life collect a substance called "china", which people use for many years as a decoration. Her witchmark is a snake. Introduced in the Summer/Fall 2013 Back to Magic line.

Illiana Honesty - Illiana is an exchange student from India who has the power to make anyone tell the truth. Her witchmarks are henna tattoos. Introduced in the Summer/Fall 2013 Back to Magic line.

Angelica Sound - Angelica is one of the Witchy Princesses brought back by the Bratzillaz who has the power to manipulate sound. Introduced in the Summer/Fall 2013 Witchy Princesses line.

Siernna Calmer - (similar to Siernna): Siernna is one of the Witchy Princesses brought back by the Bratzillaz who has the power to keep anyone calm. Introduced in the Summer/Fall 2013 Witchy Princesses line. She is most likely the witch cousin of Siernna.

Carolina Past - Carolina is one of the Witchy Princesses brought back by the Bratzillaz who has the power to see into the past. Introduced in the Summer/Fall 2013 Witchy Princesses line.

=== Characters introduced in media who were not produced as dolls ===
- Levitor - Levitor is a warlock who has the power to levitate objects.
- Headmistress Magika - Magika runs Bratzillaz Academy, a school for fashion and magic.
- Toola Twins - The Toola Twins are well known at Bratzillaz Academy for being antagonists who use black magic to get what they want.
- Igneus - Igneus is a warlock who is Sashabella's love interest.
- Messieur LeTrick - LeTrick is the professor for the class "Potions and Purses" at Bratzillaz Academy.
- Tona Toola - Tona is a witch who is jealous of the Witchy Princesses and mutant them into a book.
