= Isaac Larian =

Iranian-born American businessman (born 1954)

- Born: Isaac Larian; March 28, 1954 (age 72); Kashan, Isfahan province, Imperial State of Iran
- Education: Los Angeles Southwest College
- Alma mater: California State University, Los Angeles (BS)
- Occupations: Founder and CEO, MGA Entertainment
- Years active: 1979–present
- Spouse: Angela Neman
- Children: 3
- Website: www.mgae.com

Isaac Larian (Persian: اسحاق لاریان, born March 28, 1954) is an Iranian-born American billionaire businessman, founder and the chief executive officer (CEO) of MGA Entertainment, the world's largest privately owned toy company.

== Early life and education ==
Born to an Iranian Jewish family in Kashan, Isfahan province, Imperial State of Iran, Larian's family relocated to Tehran at the age of four, where they lived in Narmak. His father had a small textile shop where Larian began working at the age of 9.

In search of opportunity, Larian arrived to the United States alone in 1971 at the age of 17, without a place to stay, unable to speak English, and with $750 to his name. He found work as a dishwasher making $1.65 an hour, then was promoted to bus-boy and then waiter.

After a year of work, Larian enrolled at Los Angeles Southwest College, then transferred to California State University, Los Angeles, where he graduated in 1978 with a degree in civil engineering.

== Early career ==
After his plans to return to Iran were ended by the 1979 Iranian Revolution, Larian started a mail-order company called Surprise Gift Wagon, which sold decorative brass products from Asia including from South Korea. Unsuccessful in that venture, he focused on importing consumer electronics with his brother Fred in a company that was later called ABC Electronics.

In 1987, Larian and his brother became a distributor for Nintendo and in 1993, they became a licensee for the "Power Rangers." The company changed its name to MGA Entertainment. By 1997, toys became their focus; they had their first internal success with the Singing Bouncy Baby.

== MGA Entertainment ==
In 1998, Larian changed the name of "ABC Electronics" to MGA Entertainment and in 2001, MGA developed the "Bratz" doll. In 2005, Bratz sales totaled $800 million well ahead of their main rival, Barbie with $445 million in sales.

MGA expanded its product offerings with toys like Lalaloopsy, L.O.L. Surprise!, Num Noms, Little Tikes, Project Mc², and Rainbow High.

In 2004, Mattel sued MGA alleging that the designer of the Bratz doll had developed the concept while working for Mattel and that MGA had paid Mattel employees to work on MGA projects. MGA countersued, alleging that Mattel spied on its salesmen by masquerading as toy buyers, re-positioned Bratz displays in retail stores to less favorable arrangements, and that Mattel paid retailers to favor Barbie over Bratz.

In November 2006, MGA purchased the manufacturer of toddler and preschool toys, Little Tikes. In 2010, MGA released the successful "Lalaloopsy" doll.

In August 2011 Mattel was ordered to pay MGA $310 million for attorney fees, stealing trade secrets, and false claims. Due to a technical procedural issue unrelated to the claims, the Ninth Circuit vacated without prejudice the $170 million portion of the judgment against Mattel for this misconduct. In January 2014, MGA filed a complaint for these claims in state court in California seeking in excess of $1 billion.

== Toys "R" Us ==
In March 2018, Larian launched a GoFundMe campaign to acquire Toys "R" Us after news broke out of them declaring bankruptcy. Larian posted $200 million of his own money to get the campaign running, and a goal of $1 billion was set. According to the campaign description, all the money raised would be used in the formulation of a bid to acquire some of the company's assets throughout the bankruptcy process. The campaign has a deadline of May 28, 2018, Memorial Day. Any donations from supporters of the campaign would only be donations and would not result in donors receiving equity in any potential acquisition of the company. On April 13, Larian placed a bid of $890 million: $675 million to buy 274 Toys R Us stores in the US, and $215 million to acquire 82 Canadian stores.

== Personal life ==
Larian is married, with three children, and lives in Los Angeles.

Larian was named Ernst & Young Entrepreneur of the Year Award for the consumer products category in 2004. He was also named the overall national Ernst & Young Entrepreneur of the Year in 2007.
