= Bratz: Starrin' & Stylin' =

Canadian-American animated film

Bratz The Video: Starrin' & Stylin'
- Promotional poster
- Directed by: Nick Rijgersberg
- Written by: Meg Martin; Norah Pierson
- Produced by: Aryeh Richmond; Cary Silver; Isaac Larian
- Edited by: Harry Hinter
- Music by: Deddy Tzur
- Production companies: CinéGroupe; MGA Entertainment
- Distributed by: 20th Century Fox Home Entertainment
- Release date: August 3, 2004
- Running time: 63 minutes
- Countries: Canada; United States
- Language: English

Bratz The Video: Starrin' & Stylin', or simply Bratz: Starrin' & Stylin', is a 2004 animated teen comedy film that was produced by CinéGroupe and MGA Entertainment and released on DVD and VHS by 20th Century Fox Home Entertainment, and later re-released by Lionsgate Home Entertainment in 2007. It can now be found on digital online streaming on Vudu and digital download on iTunes. This is the first Bratz film that was released.

== Plot ==
Best friends Cloe, Yasmin, Sasha, and Jade are excited for the upcoming prom. Their art teacher, Mr. Del Rio, assigns them a project to express themselves. They ask him to give them an extension, but he denies their petition, thus presenting them with a dilemma: get prepared for prom night or make a project that will count for 1/4 of their grade.

Each girl has a different interest: Yasmin likes literature, Cloe likes art and drawing, Sasha likes music, and Jade likes fashion. They borrow a school video camera to shoot a video and explain their points of view about the things they enjoy.

A day at the beach stresses out Sasha, who has volunteered to be the prom committee chairperson. Later, Cloe crashes her car in the woods to avoid a skunk, which they have mistaken for a cat. They call Cameron, an expert mechanic, to come and fix it.

Problems arise when Sasha is insulted in the school's newspaper. They blame Cameron and Dylan for telling the writer about their conversation at the beach. When the girls shop for prom outfits, Jade doubts her fashion sense when she picks out an outrageous outfit that the others disapprove of. After gossip about Jade appears in the school paper, they figure it was not the boys because they could not have heard about Jade's meltdown. At Cloe's sleepover, they apologize to Cameron and give him a makeover to make up for their accusations. Later, Jade accidentally leaves the video camera on, and someone can be seen walking around the room writing in a notepad.

The next day at school, everyone is going bonkers over the picture of Cameron during the makeover the girls gave him. He blames Cloe and tells her to pick up her car because he is not attending the prom.

The girls try to figure out which one has been betraying their secrets. They suspect Yasmin could be the culprit when they claim she knew about Sasha's frustration with the prom preparation. She was the only one who consulted Jade at the mall about her fashion sense and had access to the video camera the night before. She was writing the columns as a ghostwriter. When she confesses to the other girls, they get mad and ignore her. The girls try to forget about Yasmin by going to the spa, but have a terrible time without her. They admit they were the ones who had given her the idea to write more interesting stories.

Yasmin returns and apologizes, explaining that people used to comment that her column was boring, and that after she spread gossip about people, those who knew she was the ghostwriter made her feel important. Her friends apologize, and they all forgive each other. Cameron forgives Yasmin after she explains the whole thing to him.

The girls get ready for prom, and Cameron arrives to return Cloe's car after fixing it. He apologizes for accusing her of embarrassing him in the school newspaper, and the two reconcile.

On prom night, the caterers will be two hours later due to traffic, the photographer quit to become a painter, and the DJ is sick with the flu, threatening to ruin the night. The girls devise a plan for a do-it-yourself prom: getting a disco ball, setting up balloons, using their video camera to take digital pictures, preparing food, playing music, and turning an empty room into a dance hall. Jade and Dylan are elected prom queen and king.

After the four girls' video, which included the prom night dance, was shown to their art professor and the whole class, he gave them an A+.
