= Bratz =

American fashion doll and media franchise

- Invented by: Carter Bryant
- Company: MGA Entertainment
- Country: United States
- Availability: 2001–present
- Slogan: "The girls with a passion for fashion"
- Official website

Bratz is an American fashion doll and media franchise created by former Mattel employee Carter Bryant for MGA Entertainment, which first introduced in Spring 2001. Bratz dolls were popular during the early 2000s.

The four original 10-inch (25 cm) dolls were released on May 21, 2001 — Yasmin (Latina), Cloe (English blond/white), Jade (East Asian), and Sasha (Black) — with Meygan (Scottish Redhead) being added to the group in 2002 as a fifth member. They featured almond-shaped eyes adorned with eyeshadow adding lush and big glossy lips. Bratz reached great success with the expansion to spin-offs, including Bratz Kidz, Bratz Boyz, Bratz Babyz, Bratzillaz, and a media franchise consisting of discography and adaptations into a TV series, a web series, a live-action film and video games. Global sales of the entire franchise grossed $2 billion in 2005 and by the following year, the brand had about 40 percent of the fashion-doll market.

The Bratz doll lines have provoked controversy in several areas from their stylized proportions to fashion-forward clothing, capitalizing closely on pop culture trends. Since the brand's launch in 2001, franchise distributor MGA Entertainment got embroiled in a lengthy legal dispute with its rival Mattel over the rights to its design, which ended in 2011 with MGA as the victors. Related litigation is ongoing in a lawsuit by MGA alleging Mattel's theft of trade secrets.

MGA has paused the Bratz brand since the onset of the litigation and rebranded it several times throughout its lifespan, with the first of those coming in 2010 after Mattel's first lawsuit, only to return later that year to commemorate the brand's 10th anniversary. In 2013, Bratz changed to have taller bodies, an all-new logo, and branding, and continued through 2014, in an effort to return the brand to its roots. As a result, none of the 2014 product line was made available in North America.

In July 2015, Bratz relaunched a second time for 14 years with new doll lines and introducing a new main character, Raya, to the first-era lineup from its 2001 launch as well as a new slogan and website design. The bodies were changed to be 10" (25 cm) tall again, but with new bodies and head molds. These dolls were met with negative reactions from fans, as the brand was more oriented towards younger kids rather than preteens and teens like the previous dolls. Due to the poor reception and sales, the dolls were once again discontinued in 2016.

In Fall 2021, Bratz released reproductions of the first edition Bratz dolls from 2001 and the popular Rock Angelz collection from 2005 to celebrate their 20th anniversary. Since then, Bratz have continued to reproduce several dolls and collections from the 2000s, as well as produce brand new doll lines for the first time in almost a decade.

== Products and history ==
Bratz dolls from 2010

Though Bratz dolls fared poorly at their May 21, 2001 debut—mostly due to the long-held monopoly by the Mattel-staple Barbie—their popularity increased the following Christmas. In the first half-decade since debut, 125 million products were sold worldwide, and, in 2005, global sales of Bratz and Bratz products grossed over $2 billion. In 2006, a toy-industry analyst indicated Bratz had captured about 40% of the fashion-doll market, compared with Barbie's 60%. Bratz became a popular competitor with Barbie.

In August 2010, MGA released its first Bratz dolls in a year to celebrate the 10th anniversary/first decadal anniversary of the franchise. In addition to two "comeback" collections, MGA also released 10 new female Bratz characters on October 10, 2010. Bratz Party and Talking Bratz were in Target, Toys "R" Us and Walmart stores.

In 2013, Bratz got a new logo and slogan, and the dolls all got new bodies with articulated arms, with a height to match its competitor Monster High while keeping their unique faces, and sporting brand new fashions. Only the four principal Bratz characters, alongside additions: Meygan, Fianna, Shira, Roxxi and Phoebe, have been made in the new bodies.

In January 2014, MGA revealed that Bratz would go on a country-based hiatus (only for/in the United States) for a year in an attempt to rebuild the brand after an admittedly first relaunch in September 2010 to celebrate the brand's first decadal anniversary, resulting from the lawsuit against Mattel, which was met with decreased popularity. MGA Entertainment felt that it wanted to give the brand "the comeback it truly deserved".

In July 2015, Bratz relaunched a second time for 14 years with new doll lines and introducing a new main character, Raya (despite sharing the same name with a previous character) to the debut lineup from its 2001 launch as well as a new slogan and website design. The bodies were changed to be 10" (25 cm) tall again, but with new bodies and head molds. These dolls were met with negative reactions from fans, as the brand was oriented towards a younger demographic than the previous dolls. Due to the poor reception and sales, the dolls were once again discontinued in 2016.

On May 20, 2017, MGA Entertainment CEO, Isaac Larian, announced a third relaunch of the brand in Autumn/Fall 2018, in addition to announcing a collaboration with fashion designer Hayden Williams. Since Black Friday of 2018, the new set of Bratz Collector dolls designed by Hayden Williams were officially released and sold exclusively through Amazon online.

In September 2018, a new line of dolls titled "Bratz Collector" were designed by fashion illustrator Hayden Williams and released exclusively on Amazon online. The brand featured closely resemblance to the original 2001 doll line. In June 2021, for its 20th anniversary, Bratz released near-replicas of the debut dolls from its 2001 launch.

In July 2023, Bratz announced a new partnership with celebrity Kylie Jenner. On August 1, 2023, Bratz released a limited-time Mini Bratz x Kylie Jenner collection. The collection features a range of Kylie's famous looks with the promise of a "full line" of Kylie dolls released on October 1 as reported by MGA Entertainment manufacturer.

To celebrate the Mean Girls film's 20th anniversary, Paramount collaborated with MGA Entertainment to feature Cady (Lohan's character) and the Plastics as limited-edition Bratz dolls. The collaboration collection released each character on separate dates throughout October 2024, with Cady on the 3rd, Regina on the 17th and Karen and Gretchen on the 31st (Halloween).

On May 21, 2025, Bratz released an anniversary doll of Jade, "Bratzaversary", as a collector's edition to celebrate its 24th anniversary. It was released on the Bratz website and the next day on the Amazon and Target websites.

=== Controversies ===
The parental group Dads and Daughters were upset at the marketing of the Bratz Secret Date collection. The dolls were packaged with a Bratz girl in the right half of the box — either Cloe, Yasmin, Jade, Meygan, or Nevra — and matched with a mystery Boyz doll behind the door on the left. A window showing the doll's feet would provide a clue to which Boyz doll it was, especially important in the quest for a rare Bryce doll, available in only one of every 24 boxes. The group complained that the dolls' marketing was encouraging young girls to sneak out of the house and go on blind dates with strangers. It also took issue with accessory champagne bottles and glasses, but these were later confirmed to be smoothie bottles. MGA later renamed the collection to Bratz Blind Date.

On December 21, 2006, the National Labor Committee (now The Institute for Global Labour and Human Rights) announced that the factory workers behind Bratz dolls in China have labored for 94½ hours a week, while the factory paid only $0.515 an hour. The cost of labor per doll was $0.17. The retail price for a single doll ranges between $9.99 to $22.99, depending on the included items and specific retailer.

The allegations in the report describe practices found at many Chinese factories producing name-brand products for export. They include required overtime exceeding the legal maximum of 36 hours a month, forcing workers to stay on the job to meet stringent production quotas and the denial of paid sick leave and other benefits. The report shows copies of what it says are "cheat sheets" distributed to workers before auditors from Walmart or other customers arrive to make sure the factory passes inspections intended to ensure the supplier meets labor standards. It said workers at the factory intended to go on strike in January 2007 to protest plans by factory managers to put all employees on temporary contracts, denying them legal protection required for long-term employees.

After the announcement, MGA Entertainment CEO, Isaac Larian sent a statement on December 24, 2006, via email to a dedicated franchise fansite, Bratz World, and another two days later to Playthings magazine stating that the information is false and the company is not familiar with the company named in the report and MGA uses "first-rate factories in the Orient" to make its goods, besides Mattel and Hasbro. Larian said that he never heard about the news or of "the organization who is behind this negative and false campaign immediately prior to the last holiday shopping weekend."

In 2007, concerns over the body image and lifestyle the Bratz dolls allegedly promoted were raised by the American Psychological Association after it established its Task Force on the Sexualization of Girls. In its published report, it cited concern over the adult-like sexuality the Bratz dolls allegedly portray. Another study found that for young African-American girls, the dolls' racial diversity was a more salient variable during play than their sexualized outfits. The controversy over alleged oversexualization of Bratz dolls for young girls was alluded to in a 2007 episode of Boston Legal titled "Guise n' Dolls."

Bratz were not the only dolls to be criticized in this report, which highlighted not only toys but also other products and the wider media. In the UK, a Bratz spokesman defended the toy line, saying that "it is consumed by 8+-year-olds" and "are aimed at the preteen and teen market", adding that the dolls were considered for "female consumers at ages 10 to 18", with the focus on the dolls while on looks was not on "sexualization" and that "friendship was also a key focus" of Bratz dolls.

The Bratz brand, which has remained number one in the UK market for 23 consecutive months (i.e. between 2005 and 2007) focuses core values on friendship, hair play and a 'passion for fashion.'

— Bratz spokesman, The Daily Telegraph

The spokesman quoted Dr. Brian Young of the University of Exeter, saying "parents may feel awkward but I don't think children see the dolls as sexy. They just think they're pretty." Isaac Larian, in comments given to the BBC, said that the report was a "bunch of garbage" and that the people who wrote it were "acting irresponsibly".

In line with the launch of the new line of Kylie dolls, Bratz fans questioned the choice of Kylie as their first celebrity collaborator. (Note: In 2008, Jeanne Beker was actually the first celebrity that Bratz designed a doll after.) Others did not like the skin tones on the Kylie dolls, implying they were too dark as compared to Kylie's skin tone.

In 2024, to commemorate the 65th anniversary of International Women's Day, a number of celebrities had their likeness turned into Bratz dolls, including Chappell Roan, Normani, Miley Cyrus and the late Sinéad O'Connor.

=== Legal issues ===
Since the 2001 launch of Bratz, sales of the Mattel, Inc.-staple Barbie fashion dolls began to decline. In 2004, sales figures showed that Bratz dolls outsold Barbie dolls in the UK and Australia, although Mattel maintained that in terms of the number of dolls, clothes, and accessories sold, Barbie remained the leading brand. In 2005, figures showed that sales of Barbie dolls had fallen by 30% in the United States, and by 18% worldwide, with much of the drop being attributed to the popularity of Bratz.

In April 2005, MGA Entertainment filed a lawsuit against Mattel, claiming that the "My Scene" line of Barbie dolls had copied the doe-eyed look of Bratz dolls. It added the word "only" to the toy line's slogan "The only girls with a passion for fashion" by attempting to isolate their dolls from Mattel's as many casual consumers confused the difference of two brands.

On December 10, 2006, Mattel sued MGA Entertainment for $500 million, alleging that the brand's creator, Carter Bryant, was working for Mattel when he developed its original idea/concept. On July 17, 2008, a federal jury ruled that Bryant had created the Bratz concept while he was working for Mattel, despite MGA's claim that Bryant had never been employed by Mattel at the time and Bryant's assertion that he had designed the Bratz concepts between two separate periods of employment at Mattel. The jury also ruled that MGA and its CEO Isaac Larian were liable for converting Mattel property for its own use and intentionally interfering with the contractual duties owed by Bryant to Mattel. On August 26, the jury decided that Mattel was to be paid just $100 million in damages, citing that only the first generation of Bratz had infringed on Mattel property and that MGA had innovated and evolved the product significantly enough that subsequent generations of Bratz could not be conclusively found to be infringing.

On December 3, 2008, U.S. District Judge Stephen G. Larson granted a permanent injunction requested by Mattel against MGA. Subsequently, on December 10, 2009, the U.S. Court of Appeals for the Ninth Circuit granted MGA an immediate stay of the injunction, thereby halting the impending recall of all Bratz products, ensuring that retailers would be allowed to continue to sell the Bratz products through at least the Court's final ruling on the matter. In its initial statement, the Court suggested Larson's previous ruling was "draconian" and had gone too far in awarding ownership of the entire Bratz franchise to Mattel. The Court of Appeals also ordered MGA and Mattel to resolve their dispute out of court. Isaac Larian and MGA Entertainment issued a statement that "the Court's stay is good news for all Bratz fans and for anyone who cares about fair competition."

On July 22, 2010, the Ninth Circuit Court of Appeals declared that ownership of the Bratz franchise belonged to MGA Entertainment. The Court Of Appeals rejected the District Court's original ruling for Mattel, where MGA Entertainment was ordered to forfeit the entire Bratz brand — including all registered copyrights and trademarks of the Bratz name — to Mattel. The panel from the Court of Appeals said Judge Larson had abused his discretion with his ruling for Mattel, concluding that Bryant's employment agreement could have, but did not necessarily, cover ideas as it did designs, processes, computer programs, and formulae, which are all more concrete.

In addition to the litigation for ownership and control of Bratz on October 20, 2009, artist Bernard "Butch" Belair filed a new design infringement lawsuit against both Mattel and MGA in Manhattan federal court, seeking unspecified damages. Belair claimed that his copyright designs of young women with "large heads, oval eyes, small bodies and large feet," which he had created for shoe designer house Steve Madden, were "pilfered" when Carter Bryant, during his 2008 court testimony, testified that he had been inspired by Steve Madden shoe ads which he saw in Seventeen magazine. Belair says neither MGA nor Mattel "sought or obtained permission ... to copy, reproduce, create derivative works from or distribute" his "copyrighted" work. In 2011, MGA prevailed over Belair, with the summary judgment stating that, "Belair cannot monopolize the abstract concept of an absurdly large-headed, long limbed, attractive, fashionable woman."

Mattel and MGA returned to court in January 2011 to renew its battle over who owns Bratz, which this time includes accusations from both companies that the other side stole trade secrets. In April 2011, a federal jury returned a verdict supporting MGA, with Mattel in August that year ordered by the same court to pay MGA $310 million for attorney fees, stealing trade secrets and false claims rather than the $88.5 million issued in April.

In July 2012, MGA Entertainment sued pop singer Lady Gaga for $10 million for causing, according to the BBC, "deliberate delays to the release of a doll based on her image."

The Ninth Circuit Court of Appeals vacated without prejudice the $170 million judgment from 2008 against Mattel on procedural grounds in January 2013. In 2014, MGA filed a complaint in a California state court, seeking in excess of $1 billion.

== Media franchising ==
=== Films ===
There have been a number of animated Bratz direct-to-video films, all of which initially were distributed by 20th Century Fox Home Entertainment and were later re-released through Lionsgate. Bratz Babyz Save Christmas, initially released in 2008, was re-released by Lionsgate in 2013 as Bratz Babyz Save Christmas: The Movie. The live-action adaptation of the franchise involving the four main characters discovering high school troubles and cliques was met with overpoweringly negative reviews from critics including at Rotten Tomatoes with emphasis "full of mixed messages and dubious role-models", adding that "Bratz is too shallow even for its intended audience."

In 2025, Amazon MGM Studios won bidding rights to produce a new live-action film, with Picturestart and Kim Kardashian to produce.

Traditional animation

- Bratz: Starrin' & Stylin' (August 3, 2004)
- Bratz Babyz: The Movie (September 12, 2006)

Computer animation

- Bratz: Rock Angelz (October 4, 2005)
- Bratz: Genie Magic (April 11, 2006)
- Bratz: Passion 4 Fashion Diamondz (Note: This film is also known as Bratz: Forever Diamondz.) (September 26, 2006)
- Bratz: Fashion Pixiez (February 27, 2007)
- Bratz Kidz: Sleep-Over Adventure (July 31, 2007)
- Bratz: Super Babyz (October 9, 2007)
- Bratz Kidz: Fairy Tales (February 26, 2008)
- Bratz: Girlz Really Rock (September 22, 2008)
- Bratz Babyz Save Christmas (November 5, 2008)
- Bratz: Pampered Petz (October 5, 2010)
- Bratz: Desert Jewelz (January 10, 2012)
- Bratz: Go to Paris the Movie (October 8, 2013) (Note: This film is a compilation of the Bratz episodes "Bratz in Playland", "Bratz in Franceland", and "Bratz in Toyland", which originally aired in 2006.)
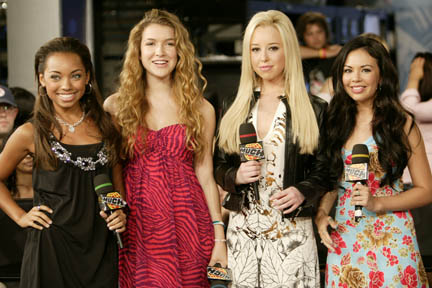
  The cast of the 2007 film Bratz, at MuchMusic (Canada) for a MuchOnDemand episode.

Live-action

- Bratz (August 3, 2007)

=== Television and web series ===
==== Bratz TV series ====
A computer-animated TV series adaptation was produced by Mike Young Productions (now Splash Entertainment) and premiered in the United States on 4Kids TV. Voices included Tia Mowry, Lacey Chabert and others.

==== Bratz: BFF (Best Friends Forever) ====
In August 2007, an 88-minute, computer-animated, audiovisual production titled Bratz: BFF (Best Friends Forever) was released on the DVD rental website portal of Netflix.

==== Bratz Design Academy ====
From October 2008, Nickelodeon UK aired a reality show titled Bratz Design Academy, in which young girls aged 9 to 14 compete in fashion challenges similar to Project Runway, with the winner designing clothing for a British line of Bratz dolls.

==== Bratz Rock ====
On October 10, 2010, MGA premiered the first episode of an 11-episode web series, titled Bratz Rock, revolving around the main characters as they enter a music competition held by fictional music star Whisper, and as they get closer to finishing their song for the contest, they also uncover Whisper's true identity. On October 14, 2010, the series was announced as postponed, but the remaining episodes were not released.

==== Bratz (web series) ====
In August 2015, a stop-motion web series premiered on YouTube. MGA confirmed there would be 10 episodes for the first season, which would turn out to be the only season. All 10 episodes were compiled into a 25-minute video titled Bratz: Friends Forever on Netflix. The web series was seen on American TV on Kabillion.

==== Talking Bratz (web series) ====
In May 2021, Bratz announced via Twitter that a web series titled "Talking Bratz" would air exclusively on its TikTok. In a similar CGI-style animation to the original TV series which aired between 2005 and 2008, the series consisted of several Bratz characters being interviewed in a talk show-like studio. The series saw the return of two of the TV series' cast in Olivia Hack (Cloe) and Ogie Banks (Dylan).

==== Alwayz Bratz (web series) ====
On August 31, 2023, Bratz announced on its TikTok that it is going to weekly air a two-minute miniseries on there titled "Alwayz Bratz". It started on September 15, 2023. and ended on December 9, 2023 with 13 episodes. In a CGI-style animation different from Talking Bratz, the series focuses on the main characters, who are young adults in their twenties, pursuing a TV pitch to get their show on streaming services. Meanwhile, Cloe is persuading her friends to began dating and set two of them up on a dating app without their consent. In an Instagram post on January 30, 2025, Bratz announced a second season of their continuous Alwayz Bratz miniseries since 2023, and the season premiered on February 7, 2025.

=== Digital Dolls ===
In January 2024, MGA Entertainment partnered with Flickplay in a five-year deal to create digital Bratz dolls. The digital dolls will be used on Flickplay, on other platforms, and in online games.

== Discography ==
- Bratz: Rock Angelz Soundtrack (2005)
- Bratz: Genie Magic Soundtrack (2006)
- Bratz: Forever Diamondz Soundtrack (2006)
- Bratz: The Motion Picture Soundtrack (2007)
- Bratz: Fashion Pixiez Soundtrack (2007)
- Bratz: Girlz Really Rock Soundtrack (2008)

== Games ==
=== Video games ===
List of Bratz video games, by year
Title	Year	Platform(s)	Publisher	Genre	Ref.
Bratz	2002	Game Boy Advance; PlayStation; Windows	Ubisoft	Music/rhythm	
Bratz World: The Jet Set	2005	Leapster	LeapFrog Enterprises	Educational, sports	
Bratz: Rock Angelz	2005	Game Boy Advance; GameCube; PlayStation 2; Windows	THQ	Adventure	
Lil' Bratz: Friends, Fashion and Fun	2006	V.Smile	VTech	Educational	
Bratz: Forever Diamondz	2006	Game Boy Advance; GameCube; Nintendo DS; PlayStation 2	THQ	Action, adventure	
Bratz Babyz	2006	Game Boy Advance; Windows	THQ	Action	
Bratz Fashion Pixiez: The Secret Necklace	2007	V.Flash	VTech	Educational	
Bratz: Ponyz	2007	Nintendo DS	The Game Factory; K.E. Media	Simulation	
Bratz: The Movie	2007	GameCube; PlayStation 2; Wii	THQ (GC, PS2, Wii); Noviy Disk (Wii)	Simulation	
Bratz: 4 Real	2007	Nintendo DS; Windows	THQ; Noviy Disk	Action, simulation	
Bratz: Super Babyz	2008	Nintendo DS; Windows	THQ	Action	
Bratz: Ponyz 2	2008	Nintendo DS	The Game Factory	Simulation	
Bratz: Girlz Really Rock	2008	Nintendo DS; PlayStation 2; Wii	THQ; Noviy Disk	Action, simulation	
Bratz Kidz: Slumber Party/Bratz Kidz: The Kidz With a Passion for Fun!/Bratz Kidz: Party	2008	Nintendo DS; Wii	The Game Factory	Party	
Bratz: Fashion Boutique	2012	Nintendo DS; Nintendo 3DS	Activision	Simulation	
Bratz: Flaunt Your Fashion	2022	Nintendo Switch; PlayStation 4; PlayStation 5; Xbox One; Xbox Series X|S; Windows	Outright Games	Simulation	
Bratz Rhythm & Style	2025	S Windows	Outright Games	Action, adventure casual, music	

=== DVD games ===
- Bratz: Passion 4 Fashion (2006)
- Livin' It Up with the Bratz (2006)
- Bratz Babyz: Dare-a-oke (2006)
- Bratz: Glitz 'n' Glamour (2007)
- Lil' Bratz: Party Time! (2008)

=== Apps ===
- Bratz (2010)
- Bratz: Style Starz Auto-Tune (2012)
- Bratz Cam (2013)
- Bratz: Action Heroez (2013)
- Bratz: Fashion Match (2013)
- Bratz Emoji (2015)
- The Bratz App (2015)
- Bratz: Total Fashion Makeover (2021)

=== Card game ===
- Bratz Fashion Party Fever Game (2004)
