= MGA Entertainment =

American toy company

MGA Entertainment, Inc.
- Logo used since 2019
- Type: Private
- Industry: Toys and entertainment
- Founded: 1979; 47 years ago (as ABC Electronics)
- Founder: Isaac Larian
- Headquarters: 9220 Winnetka Avenue, Chatsworth, California, United States
- Area served: Worldwide
- Key people: Isaac Larian (CEO)
- Revenue: ▲US $9.15 billion (2020)
- Owner: Isaac Larian (82%); Larian family (18%)
- Number of employees: 1,100
- Subsidiaries: MGA Studios; Little Tikes; MGA Zapf Creation GmbH
- Website: mgae.com

MGA Entertainment, Inc. (short for Micro-Games America Entertainment; sometimes referred to as MGA) is a manufacturer of children's toys and entertainment products founded in 1979. Its products include Bratz, Num Noms, Lalaloopsy, and Rainbow High, as well as toys targeted at boys such as Scan2Go. MGA also owns Little Tikes and animation studio MGA Studios.

MGA is headquartered in a mixed use corporate campus in the Chatsworth area of Los Angeles. In 2018, the chairman and CEO of MGA Entertainment, Isaac Larian, announced that an Australian office of the business would be opening in early 2019.

== History ==
Isaac Larian, a civil engineering student from Iran, started a mail-order company called Surprise Gift Wagon, which sold decorative brass products from Asia, including South Korea. After his plans to return to Iran were ended by the 1979 Iranian Revolution, he started an importing company with his brother Fred called ABC Electronics.

In 1987, Larian and his brother became a distributor for Nintendo and in 1993, they became a licensee for the "Power Rangers." The company changed its name to Micro Games of America, making several handheld mini games and then to MGA. By 1997, toys became their focus; they had their first internal success with the Singing Bouncy Baby.

== Products ==
=== Bratz ===
Introduced in 2001, Bratz is MGA's most successful product line, with various spin-offs from the original teenage dolls, including miniature versions (Lil' Bratz), kid versions (Bratz Kidz), baby dolls (Bratz Babyz), pets (Bratz Petz), tiny baby dolls with pets (Lil' Angelz), TV series (of the same name), live-action feature film (Bratz: The Movie) and direct-to-video film (Bratz Girlz Really Rock) and numerous DVDs and soundtracks. Because of the lawsuit brought by Mattel against MGA in 2008, the Bratz Kidz and Bratz Lil' Angelz were renamed "4*Ever Kidz" and "4*Ever Lil' Angelz", respectively, before their eventual discontinuation in 2009. They returned in 2010 for their 10th anniversary with brand new bodies and makeup, which resembled the makeup of the prototypes for the original dolls. In 2013, they were given a new, taller body and a brand new logo. They took a hiatus a year later to rebuild the brand to try and match their original success. They returned, once again, in 2015 with completely new branding, head and body molds, and the return of the original logo. They were met with low sales and dissatisfaction from children and fans alike, and were discontinued again in 2016. They returned in 2018 with a collector line designed by Hayden Williams, and relaunched the original 2001 dolls for their 20th anniversary in 2021. The line has since released reproductions of original lines, new doll assortments and promotional media such as TikTok videos.

=== Moxie Girlz and Moxie Teenz ===
In 2009, a new doll line named Moxie Girlz was introduced. These Moxie girlz are similar, but legally distinct, from the Bratz line of dolls. This is to circumvent the ruling from the lawsuit described below.

The Moxie Girlz were intended to replace Bratz, but when they came back, the Moxie Girlz became a separate line of their own. The line includes Avery, Lexa, Sophina, Bria and more characters, and has been around since 2009. They are similar to the Bratz line, only this line shows more modest fashions that typical tweens would wear.

As of 2021, no Moxie Teenz were made after 2011, and Moxie Girlz were discontinued in 2014. Leftover dolls were made into Moxie Girlz Friends (exclusive to Target) and the Storytime Princess Collection (exclusive to Toys "R" Us).

=== Lalaloopsy ===
MGA introduced its Lalaloopsy brand in 2010 accompanied by the tagline "Sew Magical, Sew Cute." Lalaloopsy dolls were once rag dolls who appeared to come to life when their last stitch was sewn. Each Lalaloopsy doll has a 'personality' reflected by the fabrics used to make them. Each Lalaloopsy doll comes with his or her own pet.

Lalaloopsy dolls stand approximately 13 inches tall. Large dolls include Rosy Bumps 'n' Bruises, Crumbs Sugar Cookie, Dot Starlight, Peanut Big Top, and many more.

The Lalaloopsy line includes Littles dolls, the younger brothers and sisters of Lalaloopsy dolls. Just like their older siblings, the Littles magically came to life when their very last stitch was sewn. The Lalaloopsy Littles have their own unique personalities and pets. There are currently over 30 Lalaloopsy Littles dolls, including Matey Anchors (Marina Anchors' brother), Bundles Snuggle Stuff (Mittens Fluff 'n' Stuff's sister), and Scribbles Splash (Spot Splatter Splash's sister).

Also in the Lalaloopsy line are Mini Lalaloopsy, Lalaloopsy Micros, and Accessories. The Accessories line includes outfits and furniture for the Lalaloopsy dolls and Littles dolls, and Mini Lalaloopsy playsets and vehicles. Lalaloopsy dolls are sold in-store and online at a variety of retailers. On December 7, 2010, Lalaloopsy won the People's Play Award for large dolls.

The toy line’s popularity peaked at around 2013. The line was revamped in 2017 with a Netflix show called We're Lalaloopsy, and the classic dolls returned in 2021 for its 10th anniversary.

=== L.O.L. Surprise! ===
The toymaker launched the unboxing toy line L.O.L. Surprise! ("Li'l Outrageous Littles") on December 7, 2016. The brand became a huge success for MGA and the L.O.L. Surprise doll assortment was the #1 toy for 2017 through November in the US, according to The NPD Group. MGA Entertainment planned to double the sales of L.O.L. Surprise toys in 2018. Several new higher-priced L.O.L. Surprise toys were released over summer including the L.O.L. Surprise House, L.O.L. Amazing Surprise, and the L.O.L. Bigger Surprise!. The L.O.L. Amazing Surprise Playset was a Top 100 toy on Amazon in November 2019, according to Shareably.

The L.O.L. Surprise brand was expanded in 2019 with the addition of the L.O.L. O.M.G. fashion dolls ("Outrageous Millennial Girls"). The new line received the award of Doll of the Year at 2020's Annual Toy Industry Awards in addition to the main L.O.L. Surprise brand winning the Toy of the Year award for a third consecutive year. 2020 saw the introduction of another spin-off line – the L.O.L. J.K. mini fashion dolls which were released during that summer. They were under fire in 2018 and 2019 for the anatomically correct LOL surprise Boys line.

The COVID-19 pandemic disrupted production of L.O.L. and threatened supply for the 2020 holiday season. In April 2020 a special edition charity doll was announced – named Frontline Hero, one dollar from every sale would go to the company's MGA Entertainment Cares non-profit.

On October 8, 2021, an animated 47 min feature film, L.O.L. Surprise! The Movie was released on Netflix as an original movie. The film is about Queen Bee, a young girl who finds herself in the popular dolls' animated world, where she must help them create a movie. It is the first feature length film of the L.O.L Surprise franchise. It received mixed-to-average reviews from audiences. Another movie, L.O.L. Surprise! Winter Fashion Show was released in October 2022.

Three video games in total have been launched, being the first two L.O.L Surprise! Remix: We Rule The World (2020) and L.O.L Surprise! Movie Night (2021), both developed by Maestro Interactive Games, and released for the Nintendo Switch platform. The third one, L.O.L Surprise! B.B's Born to Travel (2022), developed by Xaloc Studios, has been launched for Steam, Nintendo Switch, PS4, PS5, Xbox One, Xbox Series X/S.

=== Project Mc^{2} ===
Project Mc^{2} was a product line introduced in 2015. The line included science sets and a doll line which ran from 2015 to 2018. MGA also produced a live-action tie-in series with AwesomenessTV, a division of Viacom, which ran on Netflix from 2015 to 2017, spanning six series. The line's tagline is Smart is the New Cool.

=== Zapf Creation ===
On July 20, 2006, MGA acquired a 19.2% minority stake in German toy company Zapf Creation. The deal allowed for MGA to distribute Zapf's products in North America and South America and for Zapf Creation to distribute MGA's products in certain European territories. It was announced in 2023 that MGA would acquire the rest of the company. The deal closed at the end of Spring 2024, and Zapf Creation AG was renamed to MGA Zapf Creation GmbH on July 16, 2024.

=== Rainbow High ===
Rainbow High is a doll line introduced in July 2020. The line is a spin-off of Poopsie Rainbow Surprise, which also features colorful dolls with inset eyes. Following Rainbow High's release, the dolls appeared on multiple hot-toy lists including Toys "R" Us Canada and The Toy Insider, while The NPD Group reported in August 2020 that, Rainbow High was the No. 3 best selling fashion doll line and the No. 7 best selling doll line overall in the U.S. At the close of 2020, the brand was complemented with an audiovisual franchise of in-universe-branded web series of animated shorts and episodes which were predominantly released on YouTube and later made available on Netflix. In February 2022, MGA released the franchise's first official spin-off known as Shadow High to be the brand's rival school, with the spin-off brand spotting/representing grayscale colors in clear contrast to their hosts. The line was softly rebooted in 2024 with a slime gimmick similar to Rainbow Surprise.

=== Other ===
Here is a list of products produced by MGA, past and present:

- Air Chargers
- Air Wars Battle Drones
- America's Next Top Model
- Awesome Little Green Men
- Baby Annabell
- Belly Busters
- BFC, Ink.
- Big Adventures
- Bratzillaz (House of Witchez)
- CarTuned
- Crate Creatures Surprise
- Crazy Fast
- Creature Mix
- Dojo Battle
- Dream Ella
- Finders Creepers
- Fluffie Stuffiez
- Foamo
- Georgie
- Gel-a-Peel
- Glam Goo
- Glitter Babyz
- GrossMos
- The Hangrees
- Havex Machines
- HugWallas
- KaChooz
- Laser Battle
- The Legend of Nara
- LTXtreme
- Mermaze Mermaidz
- MGA Games
- MGA's Miniverse
- Mirror Mi
- Moj Moj
- Mooshka
- Moxie Girlz
- My Beautiful Mermaid
- Na! Na! Na! Surprise
- Nail-a-Peel
- Novi Stars
- Num Noms
- Pixel Petz
- Poopsie Slime Surprise
  - Rainbow Surprise
- Pop Pop Hair Surprise
- Rainbows in Pieces
- Ready 2 Robot
- Rescue Pets
- Secret Crush
- Shakin' Pinball
- Shreddin' Sharks
- Shrek Princesses
- Smooshins
- Social Star
- Spider-Man
- Squeezoos
- Sugar Planet
- Super Click-It
- Storytime Princess
- Tobi
- Vi and Va
- VIRO Rides
- Who's That Girl?
- Wreck Royale
- Yogarrr!
- Yummi-Land

== Miscellaneous ==
MGA Entertainment also owns Little Tikes, a popular infant, toddler and preschool toy line brand. During the 1990s, MGA also released handheld versions of various arcade games from Namco (Pac-Man, Ms. Pac-Man, and Mappy), Taito (Space Invaders) and Atari (Centipede, Asteroids and Super Breakout), as well as handheld games based on Navy Seals, Goosebumps, Power Rangers (currently owned by Hasbro), Starship Troopers, and RoboCop, the latter two are not to be confused with similar handhelds made by Tiger Electronics.

On March 13, 2018, MGA Entertainment confirmed in an email that it had submitted a bid for the Canadian division of Toys "R" Us. Their plan was, with a group of fellow toymakers, to keep some of its more than 700 locations open in Canada. CEO Isaac Larian made a statement during an interview saying "Toys 'R' Us Canada is a good business," and "If there is no Toys 'R' Us, I don't think there is a toy business."

On November 14, 2022, MGA Entertainment acquired Australian animation studio Pixel Zoo and renamed it MGA Studios.

== Controversies ==
=== Lawsuits ===
==== Bratz ====
On July 17, 2008, the U.S. District Court in Riverside considered to rule a lawsuit between MGA and Mattel to fight over the creation rights of the Bratz doll line. The jury in the case determined that Carter Bryant, creator of the Bratz doll line, had violated his exclusivity contract and had designed the dolls while he was still working at Mattel. Mattel was awarded $100 million US in damages, far less than the $1 billion they were seeking.

On December 3, 2008, U.S. District judge Stephen Larson granted an injunction requested by Mattel, which effectively banned MGA from manufacturing and selling Bratz dolls, though he allowed MGA to continue selling Bratz through the end of the 2008 holiday season. Larson determined that all of MGA's Bratz produced from 2001 through 2008, except for the Kidz and Lil Angelz lines, infringed on Mattel's intellectual property. Larson allowed MGA to continue to manufacture the Kidz and Lil Angelz lines, provided that they not be promoted under the Bratz brand. He also stipulated that MGA must, at their own cost, remove all Bratz merchandise from retailers' shelves, reimburse retailers for said merchandise, and turn all recalled product over to Mattel for disposal. In addition, MGA was to destroy all marketing materials, molds, and other materials that had been used in the manufacture and sale of Bratz. MGA immediately filed for a permanent stay of the injunction and, on February 11, 2009, was granted a stay through at least the end of 2009.

On December 10, 2009, the U.S. Court of Appeals for the Ninth Circuit granted MGA an immediate stay of the injunction, effectively halting the recall of Bratz product, which was to have begun on January 21, 2010. In their initial ruling, the Court found Larson's previous ruling to be unusually "draconian", questioned why Mattel had simply been handed ownership of the entire franchise rather than be awarded a stake in the ownership of the franchise or a share of the royalties from future Bratz sales, and ordered MGA and Mattel into mediation.

In April 2011, a federal court jury in Santa Ana, California, awarded MGA $88.4 Million and ruled that MGA didn't steal the idea for Bratz dolls from Mattel or infringe its copyright. Additionally, the jury found Mattel liable for stealing closely held trade secrets from MGA and other toymakers.

Due to a technical procedural issue having nothing to do with the merits of the claims, the Ninth circuit vacated without prejudice the $170 million judgment against Mattel for this misconduct. On January 13, 2014, MGA filed a complaint for these claims in State court in California seeking in excess of $1 billion.

==== L.O.L. Dolls! ====
In September 2024, T.I. and Tameka "Tiny" Harris won a $71 million lawsuit against MGA Entertainment, the company behind L.O.L. Surprise! O.M.G. dolls. The lawsuit claimed MGA violated the intellectual property rights of the couple's music group, the OMG Girlz, by copying their image and likeness for more than a dozen dolls. The OMG Girlz, a group formed in 2009, includes Bahja Rodriguez, Breaunna Womack, and Zonnique Pullins (Tiny's daughter). The court found that MGA's dolls infringed on the trade dress and misappropriated the likeness of the band.

=== Other controversies ===
The L.O.L. Surprise line of dolls have been criticized for being anatomically correct.

In June 2020, Instagrammer Amina Mucciolo, known as Tasselfairy, alleged a doll in the L.O.L Surprise line called "Rainbow Raver" had plagiarized her likeness from photos posted on social media. MGA denied the allegations stating they "deeply respect the artistic and creative community and would not take from a creator in the way suggested." MGA founder and CEO Isaac Larian responded to the allegations on Twitter, calling Mucciolo a "Liar and a extortinist[sic] and fraud" and a "disgrace to Black people" and threatening legal action. He later deleted these messages and posted an apology before taking down his Twitter account after receiving backlash.

== See also ==
- List of game manufacturers
- Fisher-Price
- Bandai
- Hasbro
- LEGO
- Mattel
- Spin Master
- TOMY
