= T-Pain discography =

Hip-hop recording artist discography

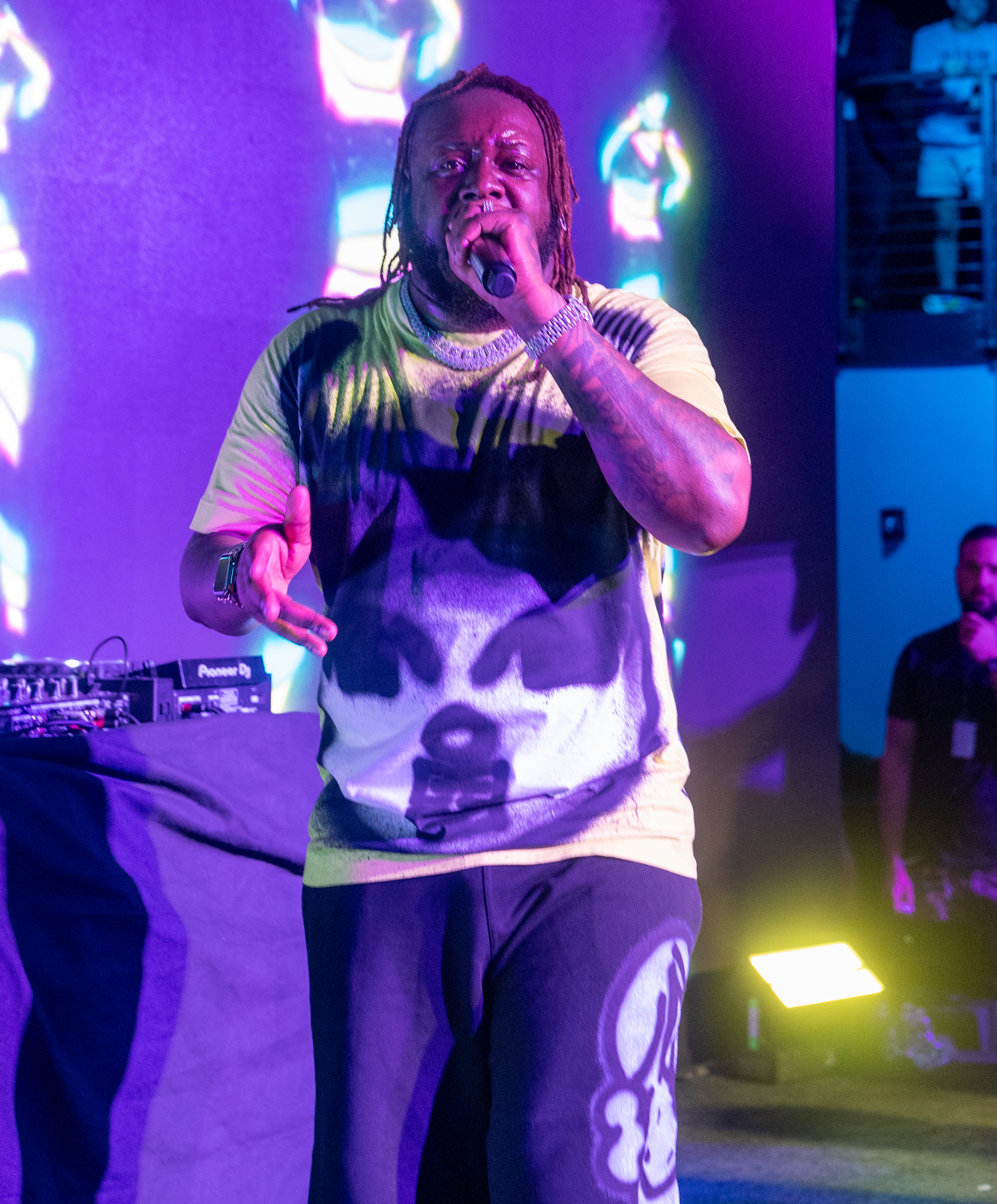
- T-Pain at South by Southwest in 2022
- Studio albums: 7
- Soundtrack albums: 1
- Compilation albums: 1
- Singles: 21
- Music videos: 19
- Mixtapes: 7

The discography of American singer T-Pain consists of seven studio albums, one compilation album, one soundtrack album, one instrumental album, seven mixtapes, 21 singles and nineteen music videos.

On December 6, 2005, his debut studio album Rappa Ternt Sanga debuted at number 33 on the US Billboard 200. Both singles, "I'm Sprung" and "I'm 'n Luv (Wit a Stripper)", peaked in the top ten on the US Billboard Hot 100. After that, he collaborated with fellow rapper E-40 and singer Kandi Burruss on the single "U and Dat", which peaked at number 13 in the United States. In 2007, his second album, titled Epiphany (2007), debuted at number 1 in the United States. The lead single "Buy U a Drank (Shawty Snappin')" peaked at number 1 in the United States, the follow-up single "Bartender" peaked at number 5, and "Church" was released as the album's third single. During 2007, T-Pain made several guest appearances on songs by other performing artists, the most commercially successful of these being "Low" by Flo Rida, which peaked at number 1 in the United States and on several national singles charts worldwide.

In November 2008, T-Pain released his third studio album, Three Ringz which debuted at number 4 in the United States. Three singles were released from the album: "Chopped 'n' Skrewed", "Can't Believe It", and "Freeze". In 2008, T-Pain appeared on several other singles by other performing artists, including "Got Money" by Lil Wayne, "The Boss" by Rick Ross, and "One More Drink" by Ludacris. T-Pain's fourth studio album, Revolver, was released in December 2011. The album was preceded by the release of the promotional singles "Take Your Shirt Off", "Reverse Cowgirl", and "Rap Song", as well as the single "Booty Wurk (One Cheek at a Time)", which attained mixed success on worldwide charts. On May 4, 2011, T-Pain released a mixtape, PrEVOLVEr, in promotion of the album. The first official single from Revolver was "Best Love Song", which features Chris Brown. The album's second single was "5 O'Clock", which features Wiz Khalifa and Lily Allen. The album's third single was "Turn All the Lights On", which features Ne-Yo.

After years of scrapped singles and project name changes, T-Pain's fifth studio album Oblivion was released November 17, 2017.

== Albums ==
=== Studio albums ===
List of studio albums, with selected chart positions and certifications
Title	Album details	Peak chart positions							Sales	Certifications
Title	Album details	US	US R&B	AUS	CAN	FRA	NZ	UK	Sales	Certifications
Rappa Ternt Sanga	Released: December 6, 2005; Label: Konvict, Jive, Zomba; Format: CD, digital download	33	8	—	—	—	—	147		RIAA: 2× Platinum; RMNZ: Gold
Epiphany	Released: June 5, 2007; Label: Nappy Boy, Konvict, Jive, Zomba; Format: CD, LP, digital download	1	1	96	—	—	11	—	US: 830,000	RIAA: 2× Platinum; RMNZ: 3× Platinum
Three Ringz	Released: November 11, 2008; Label: Nappy Boy, Konvict, Jive, Zomba; Format: CD, digital download	4	1	79	24	119	30	165	US: 700,000	RIAA: Gold; RMNZ: Gold
Revolver	Released: December 6, 2011; Label: Nappy Boy, Konvict, RCA; Format: CD, digital download	28	7	—	—	—	—	—	US: 110,000	RMNZ: Gold
Oblivion	Released: November 17, 2017; Label: Nappy Boy, Konvict, RCA; Format: Digital download	155	—	—	—	—	—	—		
1UP	Released: February 27, 2019; Label: Nappy Boy, Cinematic; Format: Digital download	115	—	—	—	—	—	—		
On Top of the Covers	Released: March 17, 2023; Label: Nappy Boy, Empire; Format: CD, LP, digital download	—	—	—	—	—	—	—		
"—" denotes a recording that did not chart or was not released in that territory.

=== Compilation albums ===
List of compilation albums, with selected chart positions
Title	Album details	Peak chart positions		Certifications
Title	Album details	US	US R&B	Certifications
T-Pain Presents Happy Hour: The Greatest Hits	Released: November 24, 2014; Label: Nappy Boy, Konvict, RCA; Format: CD, LP, digital download	171	43	BPI: Gold; RMNZ: Platinum
The Lost Remixes	Released: December 4, 2020; Label: Nappy Boy, Konvict, RCA; Format: digital download	—	—	

=== Soundtrack albums ===
List of soundtrack albums, with selected chart positions
Title	Album details	Peak chart positions	
Title	Album details	US	US R&B
Freaknik: The Musical soundtrack	Released: April 19, 2010; Label: Jive; Format: CD, LP, digital download	146	29

=== Instrumental albums ===
Title	Album details
The Instrumentals	Released: August 21, 2009; Label: Nappy Boy, Jive; Format: Digital download

== Mixtapes ==
List of mixtapes, with year released
Title	Album details
Pr33 Ringz	Released: October 28, 2008; Label: Nappy Boy; Format: Digital download
Prevolver	Released: May 4, 2011; Label: Nappy Boy, Konvict, Jive; Format: Digital download
Stoic	Released: September 30, 2012; Label: Nappy Boy, Konvict, Jive; Format: Digital download
The Iron Way	Released: March 27, 2015; Label: Nappy Boy; Format: Digital download
T-Wayne (with Lil Wayne)	Released: May 18, 2017; Label: Nappy Boy; Format: Digital download
Everything Must Go (Vol. 1)	Released: August 17, 2018; Label: Nappy Boy; Format: Digital download
Everything Must Go (Vol. 2)	Released: October 10, 2018; Label: Nappy Boy; Format: Digital download

== Singles ==
=== As lead artist ===
List of singles as lead artist, with selected chart positions and certifications, showing year released and album name
Title	Year	Peak chart positions										Certifications	Album
Title	Year	US	US R&B/HH	AUS	CAN	FRA	GER	IRL	NZ	SWI	UK	Certifications	Album
"I'm Sprung"	2005	8	9	37	—	—	—	34	11	—	30	RIAA: 4× Platinum; RIAA: Platinum (Mastertone); BPI: Silver; RMNZ: 3× Platinum	Rappa Ternt Sanga
"I'm 'n Luv (wit a Stripper)" (featuring Mike Jones)	2005	5	10	24	—	—	—	—	2	—	38	RIAA: 3× Platinum; RIAA: 3× Platinum (Mastertone); RMNZ: 2× Platinum	Rappa Ternt Sanga
"Buy U a Drank (Shawty Snappin')" (featuring Yung Joc)	2007	1	1	18	25	—	—	—	2	—	112	RIAA: 7× Platinum; RIAA: 3× Platinum (Mastertone); MC: Platinum; BPI: Platinum; RMNZ: Platinum	Epiphany
"Bartender" (featuring Akon)	2007	5	9	—	46	—	—	—	1	—	104	RIAA: 4× Platinum; RIAA: Platinum (Mastertone); BPI: Silver; RMNZ: 5× Platinum	Epiphany
"Church"	2007	—	—	—	—	—	—	41	7	—	35	RIAA: Gold; BPI: Silver; RMNZ: 7× Platinum	Epiphany
"Can't Believe It" (featuring Lil Wayne)	2008	7	2	—	70	—	—	—	13	—	100	RIAA: 2× Platinum; RMNZ: Platinum	Three Ringz
"Chopped 'n' Skrewed" (featuring Ludacris)	2008	27	3	—	—	—	—	—	14	—	—	RIAA: Gold; RMNZ: Gold	Three Ringz
"Freeze" (featuring Chris Brown)	2008	38	39	62	45	—	—	—	23	—	62	RMNZ: Gold	Three Ringz
"Take Your Shirt Off"	2009	80	—	42	—	—	—	—	—	—	159	ARIA: Platinum	Non-album singles
"Reverse Cowgirl"	2010	75	64	79	—	—	—	—	—	—	—		Non-album singles
"Rap Song" (featuring Rick Ross)	2010	89	33	—	—	—	—	—	—	—	—		Non-album singles
"Best Love Song" (featuring Chris Brown)	2011	33	—	32	—	—	—	—	—	—	40	ARIA: Gold; RMNZ: Platinum	Revolver
"Booty Wurk (One Cheek at a Time)"	2011	44	35	72	—	—	—	—	—	—	—		Non-album single
"5 O'Clock" (featuring Wiz Khalifa and Lily Allen)	2011	10	9	29	15	90	91	—	27	47	6	ARIA: Gold; MC: Platinum	Revolver
"Turn All the Lights On" (featuring Ne-Yo)	2012	—^{[A]}	—	14	45	—	44	—	7	—	—	ARIA: 2× Platinum; RMNZ: Platinum; BVMI: Platinum	Revolver
"Up Down (Do This All Day)" (featuring B.o.B)	2013	62	15	—	—	—	—	—	—	—	43	RIAA: Platinum; BPI: Silver; RMNZ: 3× Platinum	T-Pain Presents Happy Hour: The Greatest Hits
"Drankin' Patna"	2014	—	—	—	—	—	—	—	—	—	—		T-Pain Presents Happy Hour: The Greatest Hits
"Make That Shit Work" (featuring Juicy J)	2015	—	—	—	—	—	—	—	—	—	—		Non-album singles
"Look at Me"	2016	—	—	—	—	—	—	—	—	—	—		Non-album singles
"Dan Bilzerian" (featuring Lil Yachty)	2016	—	—	—	—	—	—	—	—	—	—		Non-album singles
"F.B.G.M." (featuring Young M.A.)	2017	—	—	—	—	—	—	—	—	—	—	RMNZ: Platinum	Non-album singles
"Goal Line" (featuring Blac Youngsta)	2017	—	—	—	—	—	—	—	—	—	—		Oblivion
"Textin My Ex" (featuring Tiffany Evans)	2017	—	—	—	—	—	—	—	—	—	—		Oblivion
"Getcha Roll On" (featuring Tory Lanez)	2019	—	—	—	—	—	—	—	— (Note: "Getcha Roll On" did not enter the NZ Top 40 Singles Chart, but peaked at number 24 on the NZ Hot Singles Chart.)	—	—		1Up
"Girlfriend" (featuring G-Eazy)	2019	—	—	—	—	—	—	—	— (Note: "Girlfriend" did not enter the NZ Top 40 Singles Chart, but peaked at number 33 on the NZ Hot Singles Chart.)	—	—		Non-album single
"Jerry Sprunger" (with Tory Lanez)	2019	44	20	95	34	—	—	—	—	—	32	RIAA: Platinum; BPI: Silver; RMNZ: Platinum	Chixtape 5
"Wake Up Dead" (featuring Chris Brown)	2020	—	—	—	—	—	—	—	— (Note: "Woke Up Dead" did not enter the NZ Top 40 Singles Chart, but peaked at number 28 on the NZ Hot Singles Chart.)	—	—		Non-album singles
"I Like Dat" (with Kehlani)	2021	97	36	—	—	—	—	—	— (Note: "I Like Dat" did not enter the NZ Top 40 Singles Chart, but peaked at number 18 on the NZ Hot Singles Chart.)	—	—	RIAA: Gold; RMNZ: Platinum	Non-album singles
"Been Like This" (with Meghan Trainor)	2024	—	—	—	—	—	—	51	— (Note: "Been Like This" did not enter the NZ Top 40 Singles Chart, but peaked at number three on the NZ Hot Singles Chart.)	—	40		Timeless
"On This Hill"	2024	—	—	—	—	—	—	—	— (Note: "On This Hill" did not enter the NZ Top 40 Singles Chart, but peaked at number 39 on the NZ Hot Singles Chart.)	—	—		Non-album singles
"Club Husband"	2025	—	—	—	—	—	—	—	— (Note: "Club Husband" did not enter the NZ Top 40 Singles Chart, but peaked at number 4 on the NZ Hot Singles Chart.)	—	—		Non-album singles
"Push Up" (with Sullivan King and Zoey808)	2026	—	—	—	—	—	—	—	—	—	—		Non-album singles
"STFU" (with DJ Diesel, San Holo, Nghtmre, Kompany, Samplifire and Ivory)	2026	—	—	—	—	—	—	—	—	—	—		Non-album singles
"—" denotes a recording that did not chart or was not released in that territory.

=== As featured artist ===
List of singles as featured artist, with selected chart positions and certifications, showing year released and album name
Title	Year	Peak chart positions										Certifications	Album
Title	Year	US	US R&B	US Rap	AUS	CAN	GER	NZ	SWE	SWI	UK	Certifications	Album
"Send Me an Email" (J-Shin featuring T-Pain)	2006	—	98	—	—	—	—	—	—	—	—		Non-album single
"U and Dat" (E-40 featuring T-Pain and Kandi Girl)	2006	13	8	4	—	—	—	—	—	—	196	RIAA: Platinum; RMNZ: Gold	My Ghetto Report Card
"Know What I'm Doin'" (Birdman and Lil Wayne featuring Rick Ross and T-Pain)	2007	—	58	22	—	—	—	—	—	—	—		Like Father, Like Son
"Ball Out ($500)" (Blak Jak featuring T-Pain)	2007	—	—^{[B]}	—	—	—	—	—	—	—	—		Place Your Bets
"Outta My System" (Bow Wow featuring T-Pain and Johntá Austin)	2007	22	12	2	—	—	—	7	—	—	—	RIAA: Platinum; RMNZ: Platinum	The Price of Fame
"I'm a Flirt" (R. Kelly featuring T.I. and T-Pain)	2007	12	2	1	59	—	55	20	—	70	18	RIAA: Platinum; RMNZ: Platinum	Double Up
"I'm So Hood" (DJ Khaled featuring T-Pain, Trick Daddy, Rick Ross and Plies)	2007	19	9	5	—	—	—	—	—	—	—	RIAA: Gold; RIAA: Platinum (Mastertone)	We the Best
"Shawty" (Plies featuring T-Pain)	2007	9	2	1	—	—	—	10	—	—	—	RIAA: Platinum; RIAA: Platinum (Mastertone); RMNZ: Platinum	The Real Testament
"Cyclone" (Baby Bash featuring T-Pain)	2007	7	70	6	—	41	—	—	—	—	—	RIAA: 2× Platinum; RIAA: Platinum (Mastertone); RMNZ: Gold	Cyclone
"Baby Don't Go" (Fabolous featuring Jermaine Dupri and T-Pain)	2007	23	23	4	—	—	—	—	—	—	—	RIAA: Gold	From Nothin' to Somethin'
"Kiss Kiss" (Chris Brown featuring T-Pain)	2007	1	1	—	8	6	—	1	58	69	38	RIAA: 4× Platinum; RIAA: Platinum (Mastertone); ARIA: 3× Platinum; BPI: Silver; RMNZ: 2× Platinum; MC: 2× Platinum	Exclusive
"Good Life" (Kanye West featuring T-Pain)	2007	7	3	1	21	23	78	11	—	—	23	RIAA: 3× Platinum; RIAA: Platinum (Mastertone); BPI: Platinum; RMNZ: 2× Platinum	Graduation
"Low" (Flo Rida featuring T-Pain)	2007	1	9	1	1	1	13	1	17	13	2	RIAA: Diamond (10× Platinum); RIAA: 3× Platinum (Mastertone); ARIA: 3× Platinum; BPI: 4× Platinum; BVMI: 5× Gold; MC: 5× Platinum; IFPI SWI: Platinum; RMNZ: 7× Platinum	Mail on Sunday
"Who the Fuck Is That?" (Dolla featuring T-Pain and Tay Dizm)	2007	82	42	21	—	—	—	13	—	—	—		A Dolla and a Dream
"Shawty Get Loose" (Lil Mama featuring Chris Brown and T-Pain)	2008	10	43	13	41	38	—	3	—	—	57	RMNZ: Gold	VYP (Voice of the Young People)
"The Boss" (Rick Ross featuring T-Pain)	2008	17	5	2	—	—	—	—	—	—	—	RIAA: Platinum; RIAA: Platinum (Mastertone)	Trilla
"She Got It" (2 Pistols featuring T-Pain and Tay Dizm)	2008	24	9	2	—	—	—	—	—	—	—		Death Before Dishonor
"I Can't Wait" (Akon featuring T-Pain)	2008	—	—	—	—	—	—	—	—	—	116	RMNZ: Gold	Konvicted
"Supa Sexy" (Charlie Wilson featuring T-Pain and Jamie Foxx)	2008	—	53	—	—	—	—	—	—	—	—		Uncle Charlie
"Cash Flow" (Ace Hood featuring T-Pain and Rick Ross)	2008	—^{[C]}	55	—	—	—	—	—	—	—	—		Gutta
"Got Money" (Lil Wayne featuring T-Pain)	2008	10	7	2	—	30	67	—	—	—	184	RIAA: 3× Platinum	Tha Carter III
"Cuddy Buddy"^{[D]} (Mike Jones featuring T-Pain, Lil Wayne and Twista)	2008	76	34	16	—	—	—	—	—	—	—	RIAA: Gold	The Voice
"What It Is (Strike a Pose)" (Lil Mama featuring T-Pain)	2008	—	—	—	—	—	—	—	—	—	—		VYP (Voice of the Young People)
"Beam Me Up" (Tay Dizm featuring T-Pain and Rick Ross)	2008	—	91	—	—	—	—	—	—	—	—		Welcome to the New World
"Go Girl" (Ciara featuring T-Pain)	2008	78	26	—	—	—	—	—	—	—	—		Fantasy Ride
"Go Hard" (DJ Khaled featuring Kanye West and T-Pain)	2008	69	53	19	—	—	—	—	—	—	—		We Global
"One More Drink" (Ludacris featuring T-Pain)	2008	24	15	4	—	—	—	—	—	—	—		Theater of the Mind
"Moon of Dreams" (Ruslana featuring T-Pain)	2008	—	—	—	—	—	—	—	—	—	—		Wild Energy
"Blame It" (Jamie Foxx featuring T-Pain)	2009	2	1	—	79	7	—	29	—	—	123	RIAA: Platinum; RMNZ: Platinum	Intuition
"I'm on a Boat" (The Lonely Island featuring T-Pain)	2009	56	—	—	14	62	—	9	—	—	199	RIAA: 2× Platinum; ARIA: Gold; MC: Gold; RMNZ: Gold	Incredibad
"Hustler's Anthem '09" (Busta Rhymes featuring T-Pain)	2009	—	51	19	—	73	—	—	—	—	—		Back on My B.S.
"Feel It" (DJ Felli Fel featuring T-Pain, Sean Paul, Flo Rida and Pitbull)	2009	—	—	23	—	—	—	—	—	—	—		Non-album single
"All the Above" (Maino featuring T-Pain)	2009	39	59	10	—	—	—	—	—	—	—	RIAA: Platinum; RMNZ: Gold	If Tomorrow Comes...
"Everybody Else" (Twank Star featuring T-Pain)	2009	—	91	—	—	—	—	—	—	—	—		Say Hello to Forever
"Download" (Lil' Kim featuring T-Pain and Charlie Wilson)	2009	—^{[E]}	21	16	—	—	—	—	—	—	—		Non-album single
"Sun Come Up" (Glasses Malone featuring Rick Ross, T-Pain and Birdman)	2009	—	94	—	—	—	—	—	—	—	—		Beach Cruiser
"Overtime" (Ace Hood featuring Akon and T-Pain)	2009	—^{[F]}	70	—	—	—	—	—	—	—	—		Ruthless
"Maybach Music 2" (Rick Ross featuring Kanye West, T-Pain and Lil Wayne)	2009	92	54	—	—	—	—	—	—	—	—		Deeper Than Rap
"Money Round Here" (C-Ride featuring T-Pain)	2009	—	—^{[G]}	—	—	—	—	—	—	—	—		Non-album single
"Body Language" (Jesse McCartney featuring T-Pain)	2009	35	—	—	—	78	—	—	—	—	—	RMNZ: Gold	Departure: Recharged
"Imagínate" (Wisin & Yandel featuring T-Pain)	2009	—	—	—	—	—	—	—	—	—	—		La Revolución
"All I Do Is Win" (DJ Khaled featuring T-Pain, Ludacris, Snoop Dogg and Rick Ross)	2010	24	8	6	—	69	—	—	—	—	—	RIAA: 3× Platinum; MC: Platinum; BPI: Gold; RMNZ: Platinum	Victory
"We Are the World 25 for Haiti" (as part of Artists for Haiti)	2010	2	—	—	—	7	—	8	5	—	50		Non-album singles
"Tattoo Girl (Foreva)" (Detail featuring Lil Wayne, T-Pain and Travie McCoy)	2010	—	—	—	—	—	—	—	—	—	—		Non-album singles
"My Own Step" (Roscoe Dash featuring T-Pain and Fabo)	2010	—	89	—	—	—	—	—	—	—	—		Step Up 3D soundtrack
"Trillionaire" (Bun B featuring T-Pain)	2010	—	77	—	—	—	—	—	—	—	—		Trill OG
"Hey Baby (Drop It to the Floor)" (Pitbull featuring T-Pain)	2010	7	—^{[H]}	8	10	10	24	23	17	21	38	RIAA: 4× Platinum; ARIA: 3× Platinum; BPI: Gold; MC: 3× Platinum; IFPI SWE: 3× Platinum; IFPI SWI: Gold; RMNZ: Platinum	Planet Pit
"Move That Body" (Nelly featuring T-Pain and Akon)	2010	54	—	—	29	—	—	—	—	—	71		5.0
"No Dejemos Que se Apague" (Wisin & Yandel featuring 50 Cent and T-Pain)	2010	—	—	—	—	—	—	—	—	—	—		Los Vaqueros: El Regreso
"Welcome to My Hood" (DJ Khaled featuring Rick Ross, Plies, Lil Wayne and T-Pain)	2011	79	30	14	—	—	—	—	—	—	—		We the Best Forever
"Boom" (Snoop Dogg featuring T-Pain)	2011	76	—^{[I]}	—	40	—	—	—	—	—	56		Doggumentary
"Electroman" (Benny Benassi featuring T-Pain)	2011	—	—	—	—	—	—	—	—	—	—		Electroman
"Can't Sleep" (J. Randall featuring T-Pain)	2011	—	—	—	—	—	—	—	—	—	—		Non-album singles
"I Get Money" (Birdman featuring Lil Wayne, Mack Maine and T-Pain)	2011	—	63	—	—	—	—	—	—	—	—		Non-album singles
"So Listen" (Cody Simpson featuring T-Pain)	2012	—	—	—	—	—	—	—	—	—	—		Paradise
"Bag of Money" (Wale featuring Rick Ross, Meek Mill and T-Pain)	2012	64	2	3	—	—	—	—	—	—	—		Self Made Vol. 2
"Better" (Bow Wow featuring T-Pain)	2012	—	—	—	—	—	—	—	—	—	—		Underrated
"Algo Me Gusta de Ti" (Wisin & Yandel featuring Chris Brown and T-Pain)	2012	—^{[J]}	—	—	—	—	—	—	—	—	—		Líderes
"About That Life" (DJ Kay Slay featuring Fabolous, T-Pain, Rick Ross, Nelly and French Montana)	2013	—	54	—	—	—	—	—	—	—	—		Non-album single
"Cure the Thunder" (Sergey Lazarev featuring T-Pain)	2013	—	—	—	—	—	—	—	—	—	—		Lazarev.
"I Fucked My Aunt" (The Lonely Island featuring T-Pain)	2013	—	—	—	—	—	—	—	—	—	—		The Wack Album
"Rainbow" (Remix) (2face Idibia featuring T-Pain)	2013	—	—	—	—	—	—	—	—	—	—		Away and Beyond: The Ascension
"Sex Love Rock N Roll (SLR)" (Arash featuring T-Pain)	2014	—	—	—	—	—	52	—	—	—	—		Superman
"Heartbreak Heard Around the World" (Jacob Latimore featuring T-Pain)	2014	—	—	—	—	—	—	—	—	—	—		Non-album single
"Red Cup" (E-40 featuring T-Pain, Kid Ink and B.o.B)	2014	—	—	—	—	—	—	—	—	—	—		Sharp On All 4 Corners: Corner 1
"My Cutie Pie" (Lil Jon featuring T-Pain, Problem and Snoop Dogg)	2015	—	—	—	—	—	—	—	—	—	—		Non-album single
"Close to You" (Dreezy featuring T-Pain)	2016	—	—	—	—	—	—	—	—	—	—		No Hard Feelings
"Dreams" (Alex Ross featuring Dakota and T-Pain)	2017	—	—	—	—	—	—	—	—	—	—	BPI: Silver	Non-album single
"Senza pagare" (J-Ax and Fedez featuring T-Pain)	2017	—	—	—	—	—	—	—	—	52	—		Comunisti col Rolex
"Lit" (Steve Aoki and Yellow Claw featuring Gucci Mane and T-Pain)	2017	—	—	—	—	—	—	—	—	—	—		Kolony
"One at a Time" (Alex Aiono featuring T-Pain)	2017	—	—	—	—	—	—	—	—	—	—		Non-album single
"Can You Hear Me?" (Omarion featuring T-Pain)	2020	—	—	—	—	—	—	—	—	—	—		The Kinection
"4 U" (ImDavisss featuring T-Pain)	2024	—	—	—	—	—	—	— (Note: "4 U" did not enter the NZ Top 40 Singles Chart, but peaked at number 27 on the NZ Hot Singles Chart.)	—	—	—		Non-album single
"I Luv Her" (GloRilla featuring T-Pain)	2024	70	19	—	—	—	—	—	—	—	—	RIAA: Gold; RMNZ: Gold	Glorious
"Get Low" (Z-Pain featuring T-Pain and Mark Zuckerberg)	2024	—	—	—	—	—	—	—	—	—	—		Non-album single
"Yippee-Ki-Yay" (Kesha featuring T-Pain)	2025	—	—	—	—	—	—	—	—	—	—		Period
"Gripper" (Flo Milli featuring T-Pain)	2025	—	—	—	—	—	—	—	—	—	—		Non-album singles
"Dyin' Flame" (Tayler Holder featuring T-Pain)	2025	—	—	—	—	—	—	—	—	—	—		Non-album singles
"—" denotes a recording that did not chart or was not released in that territory.

=== Promotional singles ===
List of promotional singles, with selected chart positions and certifications, showing year released and album name
Title	Year	Peak chart positions							Certifications	Album
Title	Year	US	US R&B	US Rap	AUS	CAN	NZ	UK	Certifications	Album
"Pop, Lock & Drop It" (Remix) (Huey featuring Bow Wow and T-Pain)	2007	—	—	—	—	—	—	—		Notebook Paper
"2 Step" (Remix) (Unk featuring T-Pain, Jim Jones and E-40)	2007	—	—	—	—	—	—	—		Beat'n Down Yo Block!
"Same Girl" (Triple Up Remix) (R. Kelly and Usher featuring T-Pain)	2007	—	—	—	—	—	—	—		Non-album singles
"Tell Me This (G-5)" (Tha Remix) (Huey featuring MeMpHiTz and T-Pain)	2008	—	—	—	—	—	—	—		Non-album singles
"Ringleader Man"	2008	—	—	—	—	—	—	—		Three Ringz
"Holla Holla" (Akon featuring T-Pain)	2008	—^{[K]}	—	—	—	—	—	—		Freedom
"Take Your Shirt Off"	2009	80	—	—	42	—	—	91	ARIA: Platinum; RMNZ: Gold	Non-album singles
"Number One" (Remix) (R. Kelly featuring T-Pain and Keyshia Cole)	2009	—	—	—	—	—	—	—		Non-album singles
"Reverse Cowgirl"	2010	75	64	—	79	—	—	—		Non-album singles
"Rap Song" (featuring Rick Ross)	2010	89	33	—	—	—	—	—		Non-album singles
"All I Do Is Win" (Remix) (DJ Khaled featuring T-Pain, Diddy, Nicki Minaj, Rick Ross, Busta Rhymes, Fabolous, Jadakiss, Fat Joe and Swizz Beatz)	2010	—	—	—	—	—	—	—		Non-album singles
"Booty Wurk (One Cheek at a Time)" (featuring Joey Galaxy)	2011	44	35	24	72	—	—	—	RMNZ: Platinum	Non-album singles
"Shake Señora" (Pitbull featuring T-Pain, Sean Paul and Ludacris)	2011	69	—	—	—	33	40	—	RIAA: Platinum; RMNZ: Gold	Planet Pit
"The Way You Move" (Ne-Yo featuring Trey Songz and T-Pain)	2011	—^{[L]}	—	—	—	—	—	—		Non-album singles
"Trouble" (Remix) (Bei Maejor featuring Wale, Trey Songz, T-Pain, J. Cole and DJ Bay Bay)	2012	—	—	—	—	—	—	—		Non-album singles
"Refill" (Remix) (Elle Varner featuring Kirko Bangz and T-Pain)	2012	—	—	—	—	—	—	—		Non-album singles
"Up Down (Do This All Day)" (Remix) (featuring Kid Ink, B.o.B and Boosie Badazz)	2014	—	—	—	—	—	—	—		T-Pain Presents Happy Hour: The Greatest Hits
"I'm Cool with That"	2021	—	—	—	—	—	—	—		Non-album single
"—" denotes a recording that did not chart or was not released in that territory.

== Other charted songs ==
List of songs, with selected chart positions, showing year released and album name
Title	Year	Peak chart positions					Certifications	Album
Title	Year	US	US R&B	CAN	GER	NZ Hot	Certifications	Album
"Studio Luv"	2006	—	—^{[M]}	—	—	—		Rappa Ternt Sanga
"Tipsy"	2007	—	—^{[N]}	—	—	—		Epiphany
"Migrate" (Mariah Carey featuring T-Pain)	2007	92	95	—	—	—		E=MC²
"Silver & Gold"	2008	—	—^{[O]}	—	—	—		Non-album single
"Therapy" (featuring Kanye West)	2008	—^{[P]}	—	—	—	—		Three Ringz
"Headboard Pt. 2" (Bertell featuring T-Pain and Bow Wow)	2011	—	—^{[Q]}	—	—	—		Non-album single
"How to Hate" (Lil Wayne featuring T-Pain)	2011	84	—	—	—	—		Tha Carter IV
"Bang Bang Pow Pow" (featuring Lil Wayne)	2011	48	—^{[R]}	83	—	—		Revolver
"Look at Her Go" (featuring Chris Brown)	2011	—^{[S]}	—	—	—	—		Revolver
"6 AM" (Melanie Fiona featuring T-Pain)	2012	—	73	—	—	—		The MF Life
"When the Sun Comes Up" (Heidi Anne featuring T-Pain, Lil Wayne, Rick Ross and Glasses Malone)	2012	—	—	—	76	—	data-sort-value="" style="background: var(--background-color-interactive, #ececec); color: var(--color-base, inherit); vertical-align: middle; text-align: center; " class="table-na" | Non-album song	
"Finish Line/ Drown" (Chance the Rapper featuring T-Pain and Kirk Franklin)	2016	—	59	—	—	—	RIAA: Gold	Coloring Book
"Hate Me" (Joyner Lucas featuring T-Pain)	2025	—	—	—	—	37		ADHD 2
"—" denotes a recording that did not chart or was not released in that territory.

== Guest appearances ==
List of non-single guest appearances, with other performing artists, showing year released and album name
Title	Year	Other performer(s)	Album
"On Bail"	2006	Xzibit, Daz Dillinger, Game	Full Circle
"U & Dat" (Remix)	2006	E-40, Snoop Dogg, Juelz Santana, Lil' Flip	none
"Glad 2 Be Alive"	2007	Huey	Notebook Paper
"I'm So Hood" (Remix)	2007	DJ Khaled, Jeezy, Ludacris, Busta Rhymes, Big Boi, Lil Wayne, Fat Joe, Birdman, Rick Ross	none
"Table Dance"	2007	Boyz n da Hood, Jasiel Smith	Back Up n da Chevy
"Creep Fast"	2007	Twista	Adrenaline Rush 2007
"The Let Out"	2007	Cupid, Tay Dizm	Time for a Change
"Migrate"	2008	Mariah Carey	E=MC²
"Morena '08'"	2008	DJ Laz	Category 6
"Go Home with You"	2008	Kardinal Offishall	Not 4 Sale
"Go Hard" (Remix)	2008	DJ Khaled, Jay-Z, Kanye West	none
"Give Her the Keys"	2008	E-40	The Ball Street Journal
"Natural High"	2008	Colby O'Donis	Colby O
"She's My"	2009	Bow Wow	New Jack City II
"Shawty Wats Up"	2009	Day26	Forever in a Day
"She Wolf" (Remix)	2009	Shakira	none
"Thug Story"	2009	Taylor Swift	Unreleased parody of Love Story
"Scandalous Hoes II"	2009	Mike Jones	The Voice
"My Girl Gangsta"	2009	N.O.R.E.	S.O.R.E.
"Put Ya in da Game"	2009	Fat Joe, OZ	Jealous Ones Still Envy 2 (J.O.S.E. 2)
"Shinin'"	2009	Birdman	Priceless
"The Manual"	2010	Travie McCoy, Young Cash	Lazarus
"Ms. Tattoo Girl"	2010	Travie McCoy	Lazarus
"Billionaire" (Remix)	2010	Travie McCoy, Bruno Mars, One Chance, Gucci Mane	Lazarus
"Flight School"	2010	GLC, Kanye West	Love, Life & Loyalty
"P.Y.T. (Pretty Young Thing)"	2010	Quincy Jones, Robin Thicke	Q: Bossa Soul Nostra
"Khaki Suit"	2011	Game	Purp & Patron
"Serious"	2011	E-40	Revenue Retrievin': Graveyard Shift
"Fuck Food"	2011	Tech N9ne, Lil Wayne, Krizz Kaliko	All 6's and 7's
"Can't Stop"	2011	DJ Khaled, Birdman	We the Best Forever
"Welcome to My Hood" (Remix)	2011	DJ Khaled, Ludacris, Busta Rhymes, Twista, Mavado, Birdman, Ace Hood, Fat Joe, Game, Jadakiss, Bun B, Waka Flocka Flame	We the Best Forever
"Get It Girl"	2011	Mann	Mann's World
"King of the Streets"	2011	Ace Hood	Blood, Sweat & Tears
"Welcome Home"	2011	Bow Wow	Greenlight 4
"Out Of My Head"	2011	Playmen	none
"How to Hate"	2011	Lil Wayne	Tha Carter IV
"Naked" (Remix)	2011	Dev	The Night the Sun Came Up
"Celebration"	2012	Tyga	Careless World: Rise of the Last King
"6 AM"	2012	Melanie Fiona	The MF Life
"Tryna Get It"	2012	E-40, Twista	The Block Brochure: Welcome to the Soil 2
"Dumb for You"	2012	Krizz Kaliko	Kickin' and Screamin'
"Run To You"	2012	Flo Rida, Redfoo	Wild Ones
"Get Down"	2012	Chris Brown, B.o.B	Fortune
"I'm So Blessed"	2012	DJ Khaled, Big Sean, Wiz Khalifa, Ace Hood	Kiss the Ring
"I Run This City"	2012	Trae tha Truth	Tha Blackprint
"Goin' Down"	2012	DJ Drama, Fabolous, Yo Gotti	Quality Street Music
"Act Up"	2012	Gucci Mane	Trap God
"Bag Of Money" (Remix)	2012	Wale, Rick Ross, Lil Wayne, Yo Gotti, Omarion, French Montana	Self Made 2
"Mollie"	2012	Yung Joc	Bitch I'm Joc
"Pimp N Tha Cadillac"	2012	Shawnna	She’s Alive: Reloaded
"Mascara Tears"	2012	Brianna Perry	Symphony No. 9
"Sit Yo Ass Down"	2012	The Rej3ctz	CR33ZTAPE: Rated R
"Feelin' Hood"	2012	Red Café	American Psycho
"I Ain't Hidden"	2012	Smoke	K.A.N.G.
"I Ain't Hidden" (Remix)	2012	Smoke, Trae tha Truth	K.A.N.G.
"V.I.P."	2012	Kumi Koda	Japonesque
"The Party Anthem"	2013	Timbaland, Lil Wayne, Missy Elliott	none
"B.I.T.C.H."	2013	Tech N9ne	Something Else
"Inception"	2013	Eric Bellinger, Mario	none
"HNIC"	2013	Master P, Rick Ross, Bay Bay	Boss of All Bosses
"Addicted to Sex"	2013	Frenchie, J Lyric, Yung Joc	Long Overdue
"Bend Over"	2013	Young Cash	Win or Die
"Poe Hoes"	2013	Young Cash, Chayo Nash	Win or Die
"So We Can Live"	2013	2 Chainz	B.O.A.T.S. II: Me Time
"For the Moment"	2014	J Bravo, Twista	none
"She Get It From Here Mama" (Remix)	2014	Bertell, Yung Joc	none
"Somebody Gon Get It"	2014	Timeflies	none
"Blessing" (Remix)	2014	K Camp, Jeremih	none
"She Know"	2014	DJ KD, Elhae	none
"Sex You" (Remix)	2014	Bando Jonez, B.o.B	none
"Drop That NaeNae" (Remix)	2014	WeAreToonz, Lil Jon, French Montana	none
"I'm a Champion"	2014	Dorrough, Young Cash, Shawn Marion	none
"Beachin'" (Remix)	2014	Jake Owen, Mike Posner	none
"Geronimo"	2014	Clinton Sparks, Ty Dolla $ign, Sage the Gemini	ICONclast
"That's What She Said"	2014	Mike Epps, DJ Funky	none
"Features"	2014	Yung Joc	none
"Buried in Dollars"	2014	JW	none
"What You Know"	2014	DJ Sense, Migos, K Camp	none
"Do Me"	2014	Lil' Chuckee	none
"You Don't Wanna"	2015	Vantrease, TK-N-Cash	It's My Turn
"Mind Right" (Remix)	2015	TK-N-Cash, B.o.B, T.I.	none
"She Knows" (Remix)	2015	Ne-Yo, The-Dream, Trey Songz	none
"Count Up"	2015	Vantrease, Young Cash	none
"Turndown"	2015	The Husel	none
"Personality"	2015	Lil Dicky	Professional Rapper
"I Can Be Your Stripper" (Remix)	2015	Shanell	none
"On Go"	2015	Dem Franchize Boyz	none
"Wet Wet"	2015	Plies	none
"Whatever I Want"	2015	Classixx	none
"Drinks All Around"	2015	Choo Choo, Yung E	none
"We Here"	2015	Fabolous	none
"How to Move"	2015	Gulf Coast Balla	none
"Dirty Work" (Remix)	2015	Austin Mahone	This Is Not The Album
"I Will"	2015	R.J. Kelly	none
"6 Minutes"	2015	DJ Montay, DJ Jelly, The-Dream, Twista	none
"Rock With You"	2016	Shonte Renee	Color Me Bad (Red)
"Want Me Dead"	2016	N.O.R.E.	Drunk Uncle
"P.O.P"	2016	DJ Outta Space, Kris J	F.A.C.T.S.
"What Would You Do"	2016	DJ Entice, Busta Rhymes, Ace Hood, O.T. Genasis	none
"World Turn Up"	2016	K2Rhym	none
"Finish Line / Down"	2016	Chance The Rapper, Kirk Franklin, Eryn Allen Kane, Noname	Coloring Book
"Bring It Back"	2016	Chris Brown	none
"Come Around"	2016	Doe Boy	none
"Close To You"	2016	Dreezy	No Hard Feelings
"Thing Now"	2016	TryBishop	none
"Good Lil Bit"	2016	Tay Dizm, Krayzie Bone	Smoke
"Close to You" (Remix)	2016	Dreezy, Rick Ross	none
"Wonder Woman vs Stevie Wonder"	2016	Epic Rap Battles of History, Lilly Singh	Epic Rap Battles of History
"F*cked Up"	2017	R.M.A.	Bout Time
"Dreams"	2017	Alex Ross, Dakota	none
"In the Air"	2017	Crankdat	none
"Do Wrong"	2017	Bad Royale	none
"Want This"	2017	Shonte Renee	The Introduction
"In the Air"	2017	Trouze, El Jova	none
"Never Drink Again"	2017	Amber Renee	none
"In the Air"	2017	Sonta	none
"Anita" (Remix)	2017	Smino	none
"What You Like" (Remix)	2017	24hrs	none
"Do Wrong"	2017	UZ	none
"Go Up Go Down"	2017	24hrs	none
"In the Air"	2017	Bad Royale, Killagraham	none
"All the Way"	2017	Ron Browz	none
"How It Goes"	2017	Swazy	none
"Senza pagare"	2017	Fedez, J-Ax	Comunisti col Rolex
"OTW" (Remix)	2017	DJ Luke Nasty, Boosie Badazz	The Detour
"OTW" (Remix)	2017	DJ Luke Nasty, Ace Hood, Boosie Badazz, Yung Booke, Money Man	The Detour
"Lit"	2017	Steve Aoki, Yellow Claw, Gucci Mane	Kolony
"One Way"	2017	6lack	Free 6lack
"Rockstar" (Remix)	2017	Post Malone, Joey Bada$$	none
"Down 4 U"	2017	blackbear	Cybersex
"One at a Time"	2017	Alex Aiono	none
"#BETINSTABOOTH" (Cypher)	2017	DJ Khaled, Millyz, Dave East, Bre-Z, A$AP Ferg, Tammy Rivera, Waka Flocka Flame, Michael Dapaah, Jasmin Brown, Vince Swann, Tristen Winger, Mysonne, Cozz, Tee Grizzley, XXXtentacion, Zoey Dollaz, YFN Lucci, King Combs	none
"Paint Me in God"	2018	Mike Rebel	none
"Audi"	2018	Sixx Mann	none
"Do Wrong" (Remix)	2018	Olwik, TJA	none
"For Me"	2018	LevyGrey	Shades
"Florida Boy"	2018	Rick Ross, Kodak Black	Port of Miami 2: Born to Kill
"Pink Lemonade"	2018	The Menace	Stash House: Volume One
"Rodeo"	2018	Jacquees	This Time I'm Serious
"Audi" (Remix)	2018	Sixx Mann, Betty Idol	Trap or Starve Pt. 9
"Farsi"	2018	Ariaa	none
"First of the Month"	2018	Royce da 5'9", Chavis Chandler	Book of Ryan
"Rock n Roll"	2018	Stephen Wesley	none
"Dance with Me" (Remix)	2018	Chad Focus, Raeliss	none
"Heaven & Back"	2018	Napoleon Gold	A New Colour
"What You Know" (Remix)	2018	Trendsetter Sense, Migos	none
"4Kindz"	2018	Doc Frank, Sheed Constantine	none
"Her Finger"	2018	Gulf Coast Balla	Pray Laugh Love
"Ghetto Girl"	2018	Denver Mike, Walter French	none
"Ya Heard Me" (OG Version)	2018	B.G., Lil Wayne, Juvenile, Trey Songz	B.G. To A O.G. 2
"Who Hurt You"	2018	Daniel Caesar	none
"The Business"	2018	Lex Aura	none
"I Do My Thang"	2018	Frizzo El Mero Mero	none
"Regulators"	2018	Rafael Casal, Daveed Diggs	Blindspotting: The Miles
"Catchy Song"	2019	Dillon Francis, That Girl Lay Lay	The Lego Movie 2: The Second Part
"Secret"	2019	A1	Turbulence
"Down"	2019	Outta Space, T.I.	N.A.S.A. 2
"Gentleman" (Remix)	2019	Gallant	none
"Flexible" (Remix)	2019	Jordan McGraw	none
"Paint Me In God" (Remix)	2019	Mike Rebel, Wang Yi Tai	Vibe Presents: Urban Asia Volume 2
"Za Za"	2019	Oscarcito	none
"Okay To Smile"	2019	Sam King, Prisca, The Mad Violinist	none
"Got A Check"	2019	G-Eazy, AllBlack, Offset Jim	B-Sides
"PTSD"	2019	Fantasia	Sketchbook
"Tequila"	2019	EarthGang	Mirrorland
"I Will"	2019	Akon	none
"Condo"	2019	Afro B	Afrowave 3
"Money 4 U"	2019	Riggz	Adult Swim
"All Day"	2020	458 Rarri	458 Problems
"Dark Web"	2020	Smoke DZA	A Closed Mouth Don't Get Fed
"Klink" (Remix)	2020	Smino	S.A.D.
"Lottery" (Remix)	2020	K Camp	none
"Next Day"	2020	Dany Neville, Happi	none
"Count The People"	2020	Jacob Collier, Jessie Reyez	Djesse Vol. 3
"Next Day" (Remix)	2020	Dany Neville, Tifa, Gyptian	none
"I Miss You"	2020	The Lox	Living Off Xperience
"Brinstar Underground Depths"	2020	Glasys	none
"Look At Me"	2020	Mr. Talkbox	Playlist
"Come Home"	2020	David Banner, Ne-Yo, Big K.R.I.T., Kandi, Trombone Shorty	none
"Say What You Want"	2020	Riff Raff, DJ Paul, La Chat	none
"Do Better"	2020	J Stone	The Definition Of Pain
"Bull Fighter"	2021	458 Rarri	none
"Hit The Refresh"	2021	Voices Of Fire, Pharrell Williams	none
"Trouble"	2022	Denzel Curry	Melt My Eyez See Your Future
"WHAT'S THE MOVE?"	2023	WATSKY	Intention
"Lit In The City"	2023	Pitbull, El Micha	Trackhouse
"T-Pain Remix"	2024	Pete & Bas	none
"Hate Me"	2025	Joyner Lucas	ADHD 2
"200 Bands"	2025	Bryson Tiller, Plies	Solace & The Vices
"OUTTA MIND."	2025	YFN Lucci, Bigga Rankin	Already Legend
"Jewelry Duty"	2026	Prof	Bad Time Boy
"Call Me Back"	2026	Kehlani, Lil Jon	Kehlani

== Music videos ==
=== As lead artist ===
List of music videos, with directors, showing year released
Title	Year	Director(s)
"I'm Sprung"	2005	Flyy Kai
"I'm 'n Luv (Wit a Stripper)" (featuring Mike Jones)	2006	Scott Franklin
"I'm 'n Luv (Wit a Stripper) 2 – Tha Remix" (featuring R. Kelly, Pimp C, Too Short, MJG, Twista and Paul Wall)	2006	Max Nichols
"Buy U a Drank (Shawty Snappin')" (featuring Yung Joc)	2007	Benny Boom
"Bartender" (featuring Akon)	2007	Erik White
"Church"	2007	Bryan Barber
"Can't Believe It" (featuring Lil Wayne)	2008	Syndrome
"Chopped 'n' Skrewed" (featuring Ludacris)	2008	Clark Jackson
"Karaoke" (featuring DJ Khaled)	2008	Bank Head
"Freeze" (featuring Chris Brown)	2008	Syndrome
"Take Your Shirt Off"	2009	Gil Green
"Reverse Cowgirl"	2010	Jeremy Rall
"Rap Song" (featuring Rick Ross)	2010	T-Pain, Todd Angkasuwan
"Best Love Song" (featuring Chris Brown)	2011	Erik White
"Booty Wurk (One Cheek at a Time)" (featuring Joey Galaxy)	2011	Erik White
"5 O'Clock" (featuring Wiz Khalifa and Lily Allen)	2011	T-Pain, Erik White
"Don't You Quit"	2012	Decatur Dan
"Hang Ups"	2012	T-Pain
"Up Down (Do This All Day)" (featuring B.o.B)	2013	G Visuals

=== As featured ===
Song	Year	Artist
U and Dat	2006	E 40, Kandi Girl
I'm So Hood	2007	DJ Khaled
Outta My System	2007	Bow Wow
Shawty	2007	Plies
Cyclone	2007	Baby Bash
Baby Don't Go	2007	Fabolous, Jermaine Dupri
Kiss Kiss	2007	Chris Brown
Good Life	2007	Kanye West
Who the Fuck Is That?	2007	Dolla, Tay Dizm
Low	2007	Flo Rida
Shawty Get Loose	2008	Lil Mama
What It Is	2008	Lil Mama
The Boss	2008	Rick Ross
She Got It	2008	2 Pistols, Tay DIzm
Cash Flow	2008	Ace Hood, Rick Ross
Beam Me Up	2008	Tay Dizm, Rick Ross
Got Money	2008	Lil Wayne
Go Girl	2008	Ciara
Go Hard	2008	DJ Khaled, Kanye West
One More DRINK	2008	Ludacris
Moon of Dreams	2008	Ruslana
Imaginate	2009	wisin & Yandel
I'm on a Boat	2009	Lonely Island
Money Round Here	2009	C-RIde
Body Language	2009	Jesse McCartney
Overtime	2009	Ace Hood, Akon
Feel It	2009	DJ Felli Fel
Blame It	2009	Jamie Foxx
Hustler's Anthem '09	2009	Busta Rhymes
Download	2009	Lil KIm, Charlie Wilson
Sun Come Up	2009	Glasses Malone, Rick Ross

== Production discography ==
List of production (songwriting and arrangement) and non-performing songwriting credits (excluding guest appearances, interpolations, and samples)
Track(s)	Year	Credit	Artist(s)	Album
5. "You Got Nerve"; (featuring Snoop Dogg)	2005	Producer	Charlie Wilson	Charlie, Last Name Wilson
All tracks	2005	Producer	T-Pain	Rappa Ternt Sanga
6. "Like I Used To"; (featuring Tampa Tony)	2006	Producer	J-Shin	All I Got Is Love
8. "Lord Speak"	2006	Producer	Jacki-O	Free Agent
8. "I Can't Wait"	2007	Producer (with Akon)	Akon	Konvicted
2. "Kiss Kiss"; (featuring T-Pain)	2007	Producer	Chris Brown	Exclusive
All tracks	2007	Producer	T-Pain	Epiphany
5. "He Ain't Gotta Know"	2007	Producer	Bow Wow, Omarion	Face Off
9. "Hot As Ice"	2007	Songwriter	Britney Spears	Blackout
12. "Luv N Ya Life"; (featuring Asia Cruise)	2007	Songwriter	Huey	Notebook Paper
14. "Glad 2 B Alive"; (featuring T-Pain)	2007	Producer	Huey	Notebook Paper
4. "The Let Out"; (featuring Tay Dizm)	2007	Songwriter	Cupid	Time for a Change
12. "Lives In Da Club"; (featuring Jay Lyriq)	2008	Producer	Sophia Fresh	Step Up 2: The Streets (soundtrack)
5. "Shawty Get Loose"; (featuring Chris Brown and T-Pain)	2008	Producer	Lil Mama	VYP (Voice of the Young People)
All tracks	2008	Producer	T-Pain	Three Ringz
4. "Got Money"; (featuring T-Pain)	2008	Producer (with Play-N-Skillz)	Lil Wayne	Tha Carter III
7. "Ride"; (featuring Trey Songz)	2008	Songwriter	Ace Hood	Gutta
5. "What's Wrong (Go Away)"; (featuring T-Pain)	2008	Producer	Jennifer Hudson	Jennifer Hudson
3. "Out Here Grindin'"; (featuring Akon, Rick Ross, Jeezy, Lil Boosie, Trick Daddy, Ace Hood and Plies)	2008	Songwriter	DJ Khaled	We Global
7. "Cookie Jar"; (featuring The-Dream)	2008	Songwriter	Gym Class Heroes	The Quilt
8. "Natural High"; (featuring T-Pain)	2008	Producer (with Akon)	Colby O'Donis	Colby O
7. "RoboCop"	2008	Songwriter	Kanye West	808s & Heartbreak
7. "Give Her the Keys"; (featuring T-Pain)	2008	Producer	E-40	The Ball Street Journal
3. "Screensaver"	2008	Producer	Jane 3	Screensaver EP
4. "Digital Girl"; (featuring Drake, Kanye West and The-Dream)	2008	Songwriter	Jamie Foxx	Intuition
12. "Supa Sexxy"; (featuring T-Pain and Jamie Foxx)	2009	Producer	Charlie Wilson	Uncle Charlie
8. "She’s My"; (featuring T-Pain)	2009	Producer	Bow Wow	New Jack City II
9. "She's a Dream"	2009	Producer	Backstreet Boys	This Is Us
12. "International Luv"	2009	Producer	Backstreet Boys	This Is Us
9. "Shinin'"; (featuring T-Pain)	2009	Producer	Birdman	Pricele$$
3. "This Instant"; (featuring T-Pain)	2009	Producer (with Tha Bizness)	Sophia Fresh	Step Up 3D (soundtrack)
"What It Is"	2009	Producer (with Tha Bizness)	Sophia Fresh	Non-album single
3. "Shawty What's Up"; (featuring T-Pain)	2009	Producer (with Derryck Thorton)	Day26	Forever in a Day
3. "Language of Love"	2009	Producer	CeeLo Green	Sex and the City 2 (soundtrack)
6. "Watch You Go"	2009	Songwriter	Jordin Sparks	Battlefield
15. "Go Girl"; (featuring T-Pain)	2009	Producer	Ciara	Fantasy Ride
12. "P.Y.T. (Pretty Young Thing)"	2009	Producer	Quincy Jones	Q: Soul Bossa Nostra
7. "Sweet Hangover"	2009	Producer	Omarion	Ollusion
3. "Serious"; (featuring T-Pain)	2009	Producer	E-40	Revenue Retrievin': Graveyard Shift
10. "Ya Heard Me"; (featuring Lil Wayne, Juvenile and Trey Songz)	2009	Songwriter	B.G.	Too Hood 2 Be Hollywood
3. "Make a Movie"; (featuring Chris Brown)	2010	Songwriter	Twista	The Perfect Storm
"Better" (featuring T-Pain)	2012	Producer (with Shuko and Fonty)	Bow Wow	Non-album single
7. "Act Up"; (featuring T-Pain)	2012	Producer	Gucci Mane	Trap God
13. "6 AM"; (featuring T-Pain)	2012	Producer (with The Gordon Brothers)	Melanie Fiona	The MF Life
3. "Somebody Gon Get It"; (featuring T-Pain)	2014	Producer	Timeflies	After Hours
1. "Mindful"	2016	Producer	K. Michelle	More Issues Than Vogue
2. "Got 'Em Like"	2016	Producer	K. Michelle	More Issues Than Vogue
8. "Straight Up & Down"	2016	Songwriter	Bruno Mars	24K Magic
9. "U and I"	2021	Songwriter	Omarion	The Kinection
"PRO"	2022	Producer (with Larry J)	Day Sulan	—N/a

== Notes ==
- A "Turn All the Lights On" did not enter the Billboard Hot 100, but peaked at number 13 on the Bubbling Under Hot 100 Singles chart, which acts as a 25-song extension to the Hot 100.
- B "Ball Out ($500)" did not enter the Hot R&B/Hip-Hop Songs chart, but peaked at number 12 on the Bubbling Under R&B/Hip-Hop Singles chart, which acts as a 25-song extension to the Hot R&B/Hip-Hop Songs chart.
- C "Cash Flow" did not enter the Billboard Hot 100, but peaked at number 20 on the Bubbling Under Hot 100 Singles chart, which acts as a 25-song extension to the Hot 100.
- D Three single versions of "Cuddy Buddy" were released: the first features T-Pain, Lil Wayne and Twista; the second is identical to the first, but features Trey Songz in place of T-Pain; the third is identical to the second, but excludes Lil Wayne.
- E "Download" did not enter the Billboard Hot 100, but peaked at number 9 on the Bubbling Under Hot 100 Singles chart, which acts as a 25-song extension to the Hot 100.
- F "Overtime" did not enter the Billboard Hot 100, but peaked at number 19 on the Bubbling Under Hot 100 Singles chart, which acts as a 25-song extension to the Hot 100.
- G "Money Round Here" did not enter the Hot R&B/Hip-Hop Songs chart, but peaked at number 2 on the Bubbling Under R&B/Hip-Hop Singles chart, which acts as a 25-song extension to the Hot R&B/Hip-Hop Songs chart.
- H "Hey Baby (Drop It to the Floor)" did not enter the Hot R&B/Hip-Hop Songs chart, but peaked at number 15 on the Bubbling Under R&B/Hip-Hop Singles chart, which acts as a 25-song extension to the Hot R&B/Hip-Hop Songs chart.
- I "Boom" did not enter the Hot R&B/Hip-Hop Songs chart, but peaked at number 4 on the Bubbling Under R&B/Hip-Hop Singles chart, which acts as a 25-song extension to the Hot R&B/Hip-Hop Songs chart.
- J "Algo Me Gusta de Ti" did not enter the Billboard Hot 100, but peaked at number 10 on the Bubbling Under Hot 100 Singles chart, which acts as a 25-song extension to the Hot 100.
- K "Holla Holla" did not enter the Billboard Hot 100, but peaked at number 19 on the Bubbling Under Hot 100 Singles chart, which acts as a 25-song extension to the Hot 100.
- L "The Way You Move" did not enter the Billboard Hot 100, but peaked at number 19 on the Bubbling Under Hot 100 Singles chart, which acts as a 25-song extension to the Hot 100.
- M "Studio Luv" did not enter the Hot R&B/Hip-Hop Songs chart, but peaked at number 15 on the Bubbling Under R&B/Hip-Hop Singles chart, which acts as a 25-song extension to the Hot R&B/Hip-Hop Songs chart.
- N "Tipsy" did not enter the Hot R&B/Hip-Hop Songs chart, but peaked at number 8 on the Bubbling Under R&B/Hip-Hop Singles chart, which acts as a 25-song extension to the Hot R&B/Hip-Hop Songs chart.
- O "Silver & Gold" did not enter the Hot R&B/Hip-Hop Songs chart, but peaked at number 8 on the Bubbling Under R&B/Hip-Hop Singles chart, which acts as a 25-song extension to the Hot R&B/Hip-Hop Songs chart.
- P "Therapy" did not enter the Billboard Hot 100, but peaked at number 6 on the Bubbling Under Hot 100 Singles chart, which acts as a 25-song extension to the Hot 100.
- Q "Headboard Pt. 2" did not enter the Hot R&B/Hip-Hop Songs chart, but peaked at number 19 on the Bubbling Under R&B/Hip-Hop Singles chart, which acts as a 25-song extension to the Hot R&B/Hip-Hop Songs chart.
- R "Bang Bang Pow Pow" did not enter the Hot R&B/Hip-Hop Songs chart, but peaked at number 2 on the Bubbling Under R&B/Hip-Hop Singles chart, which acts as a 25-song extension to the Hot R&B/Hip-Hop Songs chart.
- S "Look at Her Go" did not enter the Billboard Hot 100, but peaked at number 22 on the Bubbling Under Hot 100 Singles chart, which acts as a 25-song extension to the Hot 100.
