= Rap Song =

Promotional single by T-Pain featuring Rick Ross
- Released: October 19, 2010
- Recorded: 2010
- Genre: Hip hop; R&B
- Length: 3:57
- Label: Nappy Boy; Konvict; Jive
- Songwriters: Faheem Najm; William Roberts; Tramaine Winfrey
- Producer: Young Fyre

"Rap Song" is a song by R&B singer T-Pain. The song, features rapper Rick Ross and originally served as a single off T-Pain's fourth studio album RevolveЯ, but never made it on the track list.

== Background ==
His previous singles "Take Your Shirt Off" and "Reverse Cowgirl" did not chart as well as planned, so he released the songs as promotional singles. The song was released on iTunes on October 19, 2010, and has already had urban and mainstream radio impact. The track was performed without the rap verse, during The Black Eyed Peas E.N.D. tour in Canada. The song has similar elements to the single "Buy U a Drank". Throughout the song, there are references to other "rap songs" such as OutKast's "Elevators (Me & You)", 50 Cent's "In Da Club", N.W.A's "Straight Outta Compton", Lil Wayne's "A Milli" and Soulja Boy's club hit "Donk". It also makes references to many other rappers such as Young Jeezy, Gucci Mane, Yo Gotti, Akon and Kanye West. The concept of the song is that instead of "making love" to a slow R&B song, some people prefer to "make love" to a "rap song".

== Music video ==
The music video was released on November 19. The video was directed by T-Pain & Todd Angkasuwan. In the music video the camera zooms past patrons frozen in time outside the club, heading inside the establishment where clubgoers are shown throwing cash at strippers, spilling drinks, and partying. During the music video, the part where he sings "and I'mma do you like Kanye, I'mma let you finish" a "frozen" clip is shown of T-Pain pushing a girl to the side and talking over her, referring to the VMA incident with Kanye West and Taylor Swift. The video features many cameos, including appearances by Lil Twist, Mack Maine, DJ Khaled, Flo Rida, Yo Gotti, and Bow Wow.

== Remixes ==
A So So Def remix was made featuring Jermaine Dupri. Another remix titled "Reggae Song" was made by Rock City.

== Charts ==
On the week ending September 26, 2010, "Rap Song" debuted at #87 on the Hot R&B/Hip-Hop Songs. On the week ending October 29, 2010, it debuted at #89 on the Billboard Hot 100, and dropped off the chart the next week.

Chart (2010)	Peak position
ERROR in "CIS": Invalid position: 311. Expected number 1–200 or dash (–).
US Billboard Hot 100	89
US Hot R&B/Hip-Hop Songs (Billboard)	33
