= Turn All the Lights On =

Single by T-Pain featuring Ne-Yo

from the album RevolveЯ
- Released: January 17, 2012
- Recorded: 2011
- Genre: Dance-pop
- Length: 3:37
- Label: Nappy Boy; Konvict; RCA
- Songwriters: Faheem Najm; Lukasz Gottwald; Shaffer Smith; Henry Walter
- Producers: Dr. Luke; Cirkut

T-Pain singles chronology
"5 O'Clock" (2011)	"Turn All the Lights On" (2012)	"So Listen" (2012)

Ne-Yo singles chronology
"Think Like a Man" (2011)	"Turn All the Lights On" (2012)	"Leave You Alone" (2012)

"Turn All the Lights On" is a song by American singer T-Pain featuring fellow American singer Ne-Yo, serving as the third official single from the former's fourth studio album, Revolver (2011). Both artists wrote the song with its producers, Dr. Luke and Cirkut.

== Track listings ==
- Digital download
1. "Turn All the Lights On" (featuring Ne-Yo) – 3:37

== Credits and personnel ==
- Lead vocals – T-Pain and Ne-Yo
- Producers – Dr. Luke, Cirkut
- Lyrics – Faheem Najm, Luke Gottwald, Shaffer Smith, Henry Walter
- Label: Nappy Boy, Konvict, RCA

== Charts ==
=== Weekly charts ===
Chart (2011–12)	Peak position
Australia (ARIA)	14
Austria (Ö3 Austria Top 40)	49
Canada (Canadian Hot 100)	45
CIS Airplay (TopHit)	186
Germany (GfK)	44
New Zealand (Recorded Music NZ)	7
South Korean International Singles (GAON)	1
US Bubbling Under Hot 100 (Billboard)	13

=== Year-end charts ===
Chart (2012)	Position
Australia (ARIA)	57

== Certifications ==
Region	Certification	Certified units/sales
Australia (ARIA)	2× Platinum	140,000^{^}
Germany (BVMI)	Platinum	300,000^{‡}
New Zealand (RMNZ)	Platinum	15,000^{*}
^{*} Sales figures based on certification alone.^{^} Shipments figures based on certification alone.^{‡} Sales+streaming figures based on certification alone.

== Release history ==
Release dates and formats for "Turn All the Lights On"
Region	Date	Format	Label(s)	Ref.
United States	March 20, 2012	Mainstream airplay	Nappy Boy; RCA	
