= Lottery Ticket (2010 film) =

- Theatrical release poster
- Directed by: Erik White
- Screenplay by: Abdul Williams
- Story by: Erik White; Abdul Williams
- Produced by: Matt Alvarez; Mark Burg; Oren Koules; Andrew Kosove; Broderick Johnson
- Starring: Bow Wow; Brandon T. Jackson; Naturi Naughton; Keith David; Charlie Murphy; Gbenga Akinnagbe; Terry Crews; Bill Bellamy; Mike Epps; T-Pain; Loretta Devine; Ice Cube
- Cinematography: Patrick Cady
- Edited by: Harvey Rosenstock
- Music by: Teddy Castellucci
- Production companies: Alcon Entertainment; Burg/Koules Productions; Cube Vision; Sweepstake Productions
- Distributed by: Warner Bros. Pictures
- Release date: August 20, 2010
- Running time: 100 minutes
- Country: United States
- Language: English
- Budget: $19 million
- Box office: $24.5 million

Lottery Ticket is a 2010 American comedy film directed by Erik White and starring Bow Wow, Brandon T. Jackson, Naturi Naughton, Keith David, Charlie Murphy, Gbenga Akinnagbe, Terry Crews, Mike Epps, Loretta Devine and Ice Cube. The story follows a young man from Atlanta who wins a $370 million lottery, and soon realizes that people from the neighborhood are not his real friends, but are after his money.

Released theatrically on August 20, 2010, by Warner Bros. Pictures, the film received mixed reviews from critics, who praised the cast's performances but criticized the story and characters. It was also a box office disappointment, only grossing $24.5 million against a $19 million budget.

== Plot ==
Living in an Atlanta housing project with his grandmother, Kevin Carson dreams of one day designing his own sneaker line, but currently works at Foot Locker. His dreams are supported by two of his best friends: Benny and Stacie. Meanwhile, everyone in his neighborhood is trying to win the Mondo Million Dollar Lottery of $370 million. At Foot Locker, paroled criminal Lorenzo demands that Kevin give him and his three friends three sets of sneakers each for free. However, after he grabs the shoes, the alarms go off, and the police arrive. When Lorenzo claims Kevin gave him the shoes as a gift, he attempts to explain to the police that he did not intend to give the shoes to Lorenzo. Lorenzo is then arrested for shoplifting, and Kevin loses his job.

On his way home, he buys a Mondo Millionaire Lottery ticket at a gas station, playing his grandmother's and his lucky numbers. He also gets a ticket for himself, using the numbers on a fortune cookie fortune. He meets Benny, who tells him that the whole neighborhood heard that Kevin "snitched" on Lorenzo and is even called one by their friends. Depressed, Kevin goes home and quickly falls asleep. Later, the numbers of the lottery are announced. Grandma's ticket doesn't win, but Kevin finds out that his ticket has won him $370 million.

However, when he and Benny head to the claims office, they are told that the office is closed due to the Fourth of July weekend and they must come back in three days. News of Kevin's winning ticket spreads, and the entire neighborhood swarms him and his home, begging for a cut of the money. Nikki Swayze, a seductive girl who previously rejected Kevin, suddenly develops an interest in him.

This angers Stacie, who tells Kevin that Nikki is only after his money, but Kevin doesn't believe it. Kevin and Benny meet loan shark Sweet Tee, who gives Kevin a $100,000 loan to go out and have fun. After her date with Kevin, Nikki secretly tries to make him get her pregnant, but Kevin refuses. Nikki then reveals to Kevin that she was legally trying to get half of his money by having a baby with him. He leaves the house angry and upset. Upon leaving the building, a man calls him from the basement window. Kevin meets Mr. Washington, a retired boxer who invites him to his house for a conversation.

The next day, Kevin attends church with his grandmother until Benny comes in and tells him that Lorenzo is looking for him and the ticket. Lorenzo comes in and is stopped by the churchgoers. Kevin tries to escape, but he's confronted by Lorenzo's crew. Sweet Tee's bodyguard saves Kevin with his gun, but Lorenzo emerges and physically breaks his hand. Then, Kevin runs to the train station with Lorenzo and his boys chasing him. Kevin leaps onto the train thinking he's safe, but Lorenzo gets on, too. However, Kevin hops off before the doors close. The train leaves the station with Lorenzo still on it.

Later that day, Kevin and Benny have an argument about the ticket when Benny asks Kevin to let him keep the ticket so Lorenzo wouldn't take it, which leads to them not speaking to each other. He goes to Stacie's house, and she tells Kevin that she thinks he was wrong about the entire situation. He also tells her that she is the girl for him, which leads to her getting angry and telling him to get out. He kisses her, and she responds accordingly, but they are interrupted by the arrival of her mother.

As Kevin leaves Stacie's house, Lorenzo knocks him unconscious, stealing his sneakers and ticket. The following day, he wakes up in the apartment of Mr. Washington, who talks with him. Kevin also takes time to reconcile with Benny. They make a scheme to fool Lorenzo into thinking the ticket is fake, which later upsets Lorenzo. Later, the neighborhood hosts a block party, and Kevin learns that Sweet Tee will torture him if he doesn't pay back the loan.

Lorenzo arrives, injures Sweet Tee, and beats Kevin to the point where he forces Kevin to give him the ticket at gunpoint. Just as Kevin submits, Mr. Washington appears from behind and knocks Lorenzo unconscious, being hailed a hero to the neighborhood. Afterwards, Benny tells Kevin to sign the back of the ticket.

Months later, Kevin has started his sneaker company with Benny as his CEO and Stacie as his future attorney and girlfriend. It is implied that Kevin managed to pay Sweet Tee back. He also opens a park with Mr. Washington appointed as head security, and a foundation that will help the community by funding businesses and providing scholarships. After giving a speech to the neighborhood, Kevin, Benny, and Stacie board Kevin's new helicopter and fly off to work.

== Cast ==
- Bow Wow as Kevin Carson
- Brandon T. Jackson as Benny
- Naturi Naughton as Stacie
- Loretta Devine as Grandma
- Ice Cube as Jerome “Thump” Washington
- Gbenga Akinnagbe as Lorenzo Mack
- Keith David as Sweet Tee
- Terry Crews as Jimmy
- Charlie Murphy as "Semaj" (James)
- Teairra Marí as Nikki Swayze
- Jason Weaver as Ray Ray
- Leslie Jones as Tasha
- Vince Green as Malik
- Malieek Straughter as Deangelo
- T-Pain as Junior
- Bill Bellamy as Giovanni Watson
- Mike Epps as Reverend Taylor
- Chris Williams as Doug
- IronE Singleton as Tucker
- Lil Twist as Lil J.

== Reception ==
=== Box office ===
In the United States and Canada, Lottery Ticket was released alongside Nanny McPhee and the Big Bang, Piranha 3D and The Switch, and was projected to gross under $10 million from 1,973 theaters on its opening weekend. The film made $3.8 million on its first day and went on to debut to $10.6 million, finishing fourth and coming slightly above expectations.

=== Critical response ===
On review aggregator website Rotten Tomatoes, the film holds an approval rating of 34% based on 83 reviews, with an average rating of 5.10/10. The site's critical consensus reads, "There's a worthwhile message at the heart of Lottery Ticket, but it's buried under stale humor, tired stereotypes, and obvious clichés." On Metacritic, the film holds a weighted average score of 50 out of 100, on 24 critics, indicating "mixed or average" reviews. Audiences polled by CinemaScore gave the film an average grade of "A−" on an A+ to F scale.

== Soundtrack ==
The following is a track listing of songs for the film, Lottery Ticket. Songs marked with an '*' are just songs that can be briefly heard in the film.

=== Songs featured in the film ===
1. "Workin' Man Blues" - Aceyalone featuring Bionik
2. "Look at Me Now" - King Juju
3. "Lord Rescue Me" - Jason Eskridge
4. "If You're Really Hood" - The Handlebars
5. "What You Talkin About" - Classic
6. "How Low" - Ludacris
7. "I Make the Hood Look Good" - T-Drop
8. "Tim & Bob Groove 1" - Tim & Bob
9. "We Like to Party" - Ben and Family
10. "Mysterious Love" - Lamar J and Deshawn Williams (of Take 2)
11. "I Be Doin It" - Classic
12. "Outta Control" - Envy
13. "Gangsta Party" - Classic
14. "Southside" - Johnny Ringo
15. "I Can Transform Ya"*- Chris Brown
16. "Money (That's What I Want) - Barrett Strong
17. "Hallelujah"
18. "All Your Bass" - T-Pain
19. "Tim & Bob Groove 2" - Tim & Bob
20. "Deez Hips" - Dem Naughty Boyz
21. "Oh Happy Day" - Edwin Hawkins Singers
22. "Whoa Now" - B Rich
23. "Million Bucks" - Maino featuring Swizz Beatz
24. "Tim & Bob Groove 3" - Tim & Bob
25. "I Invented Sex" - Trey Songz featuring Drake
26. "Standing in the Rain" - Al Green
27. "Come By Here My Lord" - Tick Ticker
28. "Un-Thinkable (I'm Ready)" - Alicia Keys featuring Drake
29. "Let My People Go" - Darondo
30. "Take Your Shirt Off" - T-Pain
31. "Here to Party" - Classic
32. "For My Hood" - Bow Wow featuring Sean Kingston

== See also ==
- List of black films of the 2010s
- List of hood films
