= Booty Wurk (One Cheek at a Time) =

Single by T-Pain featuring Joey Galaxy
- Released: June 7, 2011
- Recorded: 2011
- Genre: Miami bass
- Length: 3:55
- Label: Nappy Boy, Konvict, Jive
- Songwriter(s): Faheem Najm, Christopher Brown
- Producer(s): Young Fyre

T-Pain singles chronology
"Best Love Song" (2011)	"Booty Wurk (One Cheek at a Time)" (2011)	"5 O'Clock" (2011)

"Booty Wurk (One Cheek at a Time)" is a song by T-Pain featuring Nappy Boy Entertainment artist Joey Galaxy. It was released as a single on June 7, 2011, and originally served as the second single off T-Pain's fourth studio album RevolveЯ. However, the song was later excluded from the album's track listing. It was later included on T-Pain Presents Happy Hour: The Greatest Hits. The song was produced by Young Fyre.

== Music video ==
On June 20, 2011, the official music video for "Booty Wurk (One Cheek at a Time)" was uploaded to YouTube. It features an appearance by comedian Kevin Hart. The video was directed by Erik White.

== Track listing ==
- Digital download
1. "Booty Wurk (One Cheek at a Time)" [feat. Joey Galaxy] – 3:55

== Chart positions ==
Chart (2011)	Peak position
Australian Singles Chart	72
US Billboard Hot 100	44
US Billboard Hot R&B/Hip-Hop Songs	35
US Billboard Rap Songs	24

== Release history ==
Country	Release date	Format
United States	June 7, 2011	Urban radio
United States	July 8, 2011	Digital download
