= Stoic (mixtape) =

Mixtape by T-Pain
- Released: September 30, 2012
- Recorded: 2012
- Genres: R&B; hip hop; pop; electronic
- Labels: Nappy Boy; Konvict; RCA
- Producers: Boi-1da; T-Pain; T-Minus; Bishop Jones; Young Fyre; Bei Maejor; Tha Bizness; Preach Bal4; Ryghteous Ryan Tedder; Major Seven

T-Pain chronology
rEVOLVEr (2011)	Stoic (2012)	Happy Hour (2014)

Singles from Stoic
- 1. "Don't You Quit" Released: August 22, 2012

Stoic is the third mixtape by American singer T-Pain, released on September 30, 2012. The mixtape features guest appearances from Tay Dizm, Pitbull, Nuke Nikelz, Doe Montana, Notty Black, Skye, Young Cash, Mistah Fab, Krizz Kaliko, Tech N9ne, Shay Mooney, Big K.R.I.T. and Travie McCoy.

== Background ==
On August 22, 2012, T-Pain announced the mixtape during an interview with Yahoo Music, he explained that the Stoic mixtape features a surprising mixture of genres, saying: "It's basically an outlet for me, and it's so many different genres of music on this mixtape it's crazy," he said. "This is a collection of [the] kinds of things that's happening in my head, and I'm not going to show any remorse for putting all these genres together and just really hurting the world. I'm not trying to make an urban mixtape. I'm not trying to make a pop mixtape. I'm making a T-Pain mixtape."

T-Pain also explained the mixtape title reflects his need to vent, saying: "The mixtape is called Stoic that means a person that's able to take great amounts of pain without showing emotion. It's pretty much everything I'm trying to do, however I want to do it, this is just total freedom for me right now." T-Pain also explained the mixtapes lead single "Don't You Quit", saying: "You know me, I'm just all into motivation. That comes in all kinds of forms. So we just trying to venture out and make sure everybody get their piece of all of my motivation because I got a lot to give out. It's got to be an anthem."

== Promotion ==
On August 22, 2012, the first song was released in promotion of the mixtape titled "Don’t You Quit". On September 27, 2012, the music video was released for "Don’t You Quit" On October 8, 2012, the music video was released for "Hang Ups".

== Track listing ==
No.	Title	Producer(s)	Length
1.	"The Champ" (featuring Tay Dizm)	Boi-1da	3:58
2.	"Ain't That a Bitch!"	T-Pain	3:51
3.	"Don't You Quit"	T-Minus	3:24
4.	"Rhock En Rollah"	Bishop Jones	3:08
5.	"Breakup"	Young Fyre	3:53
6.	"Can I Get" (featuring Pitbull)	Young Fyre	4:13
7.	"Hole In My Pocket" (featuring Nuke Nikelz & Doe Montana)	T-Pain	4:16
8.	"Monster Mash" (featuring Notty Black)	Bei Maejor	2:32
9.	"Down There" (featuring Skye)	Tha Bizness	4:08
10.	"FairyTale"	Bei Maejor	2:53
11.	"Wool Over My Eyes"	T-Pain; David "Preach" Bal4	3:45
12.	"Streets Saved Me" (featuring Young Cash)	"Ryghteous Ryan" Tedder	3:48
13.	"Mind Fucked"	Tha Bizness	4:17
14.	"Blapper" (featuring Mistah F.A.B., Krizz Kaliko & Tech N9ne)	Tha Bizness	4:15
15.	"Invisible Girl"	T-Pain	3:19
16.	"Let You Go" (featuring Shay Mooney)	Major Seven	3:49
17.	"Going Off" (featuring Big K.R.I.T.)	T-Pain	4:06
18.	"I'll Never Be" (featuring Travie McCoy & Tay Dizm)	Tha Bizness	4:05
19.	"Why Don't We"	T-Pain	2:44
20.	"SupperTime"	T-Pain	4:21
21.	"Hang Ups"	Young Fyre	3:38
22.	"Exclusive"	Tha Bizness	6:50
