= 5 O'Clock (T-Pain song) =

Single by T-Pain featuring Wiz Khalifa and Lily Allen

from the album Revolver
- Released: September 27, 2011
- Recorded: 2011
- Genre: Pop; R&B
- Length: 4:41 (Album Version); 3:09 (Radio Edit); 3:30 (w/o Wiz Khalifa)
- Label: Nappy Boy; Konvict; RCA
- Songwriters: Gary Barlow; Mark Owen; Greg Kurstin; Lily Allen; Howard Donald; Faheem Najm; Jason Orange; Stephen Paul Robson
- Producers: T-Pain; Greg Kurstin; John Shanks

T-Pain singles chronology
| "Booty Wurk (One Cheek at a Time)" (2011) | "5 O'Clock" (2011) | "Turn All the Lights On" (2012) |

Wiz Khalifa singles chronology
| "No Sleep" (2011) | "5 O'Clock" (2011) | "Young, Wild & Free" (2011) |

Lily Allen singles chronology
| "Just Be Good to Green" (2010) | "5 O'Clock" (2011) | "True Love" (2013) |

Music video
- "5 O'Clock" on YouTube

"5 O'Clock" is a song by the American singer T-Pain featuring rapper Wiz Khalifa and the British singer Lily Allen, which serves as the second official single from T-Pain's fourth album, Revolver. It peaked at number 10 on the Billboard Hot 100, becoming Allen's first Top 10 single in the United States.

== Background and release ==
Lily Allen's part in the song is sampled from her 2009 single "Who'd Have Known", which in turn resembles Take That's 2007 single "Shine". Allen states that T-Pain initially heard her song while he was placed on hold by a store, and immediately looked her up after he was done. After being approached with the new song idea by T-Pain, Allen stated she was "flattered by what he did to my original track."

"5 O'Clock" was released on iTunes on September 27, 2011, and was released to U.S. Top 40 radio stations on October 18, 2011. The song was the last release by T-Pain under the now-defunct label Jive Records. The single was released in Allen's native United Kingdom on December 4, 2011.

== Music video ==
The official music video for the song was co-directed by T-Pain and Erik White and released in September 2011. Parts of the video were filmed in Amsterdam's "De Wallen" red light district, a choice that T-Pain decided to make after being told it was illegal to film there. It features scenes of T-Pain walking through streets of De Wallen. Billboard called the video "emotional" as T-Pain fails to get in touch with his girlfriend through text messages. While T-Pain and Wiz Khalifa appear in the video, Allen is absent due to her pregnancy at the time. An actress resembling Allen starred as T-Pain's girlfriend named "Lily" in the video.

== Critical reception ==
Consequence of Sound stated that the collaborators worked well together. The mixture of the artists’ styles was also complimented by Kiss FM as well as T-Pain's subtle use of autotune. Rock NYC applauded how the song built upon Allen's original sample.

== Remixes ==
The official remix of the song features Lily Allen and Puerto Rican duo Wisin & Yandel, and was released on iTunes on November 18, 2011. Remixes were also made by other artists, including Nelly, Young Kye, and DJ Unk. The radio version of this song cuts T-Pain's second verse. There is also another version of this song which cuts Wiz Khalifa's rap, and which was included on the compilation album Now That's What I Call Music! 41.

== Formats and track listings ==
- CD single
1. "5 O'Clock" (featuring Wiz Khalifa and Lily Allen) - 4:41
2. "Best Love Song" (V.I.P Mix) (featuring Chris Brown) - 4:24
- Digital download - Explicit Single (iTunes)
1. "5 O'Clock" (featuring Wiz Khalifa and Lily Allen) - 4:41 (Explicit)
- Digital download - Clean Single (iTunes)
1. "5 O'Clock" (featuring Wiz Khalifa and Lily Allen) - 4:40 (Clean)

== Charts ==
=== Weekly charts ===
| Chart (2011–2012) | Peak position |
|---|---|
| Australia (ARIA) | 29 |
| Belgium (Ultratip Bubbling Under Flanders) | 5 |
| Belgium (Ultratop 50 Wallonia) | 33 |
| Canada Hot 100 (Billboard) | 15 |
| CIS Airplay (TopHit) | 174 |
| Czech Republic Airplay (ČNS IFPI) | 27 |
| France (SNEP) | 90 |
| Germany (GfK) | 91 |
| Japan Hot 100 (Billboard) | 28 |
| New Zealand (Recorded Music NZ) | 27 |
| Romania (Romanian Top 100) | 58 |
| Slovakia Airplay (ČNS IFPI) | 51 |
| South Korea (GAON) | 7 |
| Switzerland (Schweizer Hitparade) | 47 |
| UK Hip Hop/R&B (Official Charts) | 3 |
| UK Singles (Official Charts) | 6 |
| US Billboard Hot 100 | 10 |
| US Pop Airplay (Billboard) | 10 |
| US Adult Pop Airplay (Billboard) | 40 |
| US Hot R&B/Hip-Hop Songs (Billboard) | 9 |
| US Rhythmic Airplay (Billboard) | 5 |

=== Year-end charts ===
| Chart (2012) | Position |
|---|---|
| Canada (Canadian Hot 100) | 87 |
| US Billboard Hot 100 | 86 |
| US Hot R&B/Hip-Hop Songs | 71 |
| US Rhythmic Songs | 38 |

== Certifications ==
| Region | Certification | Certified units/sales |
|---|---|---|
| Australia (ARIA) | Gold | 35,000^{^} |
| Canada (Music Canada) | Platinum | 80,000^{*} |
| United Kingdom (BPI) | Silver | 200,000^{‡} |
^{*} Sales figures based on certification alone.^{^} Shipments figures based on certification alone.^{‡} Sales+streaming figures based on certification alone.

== Release history ==
| Region | Date | Format |
|---|---|---|
| United States | September 27, 2011 | Digital download |
| United States | October 18, 2011 | Contemporary hit radio |
| United Kingdom | December 4, 2011 | Digital download |
| United Kingdom | December 27, 2011 | CD single |
