= Prevolver =

Mixtape by T-Pain
- Released: May 4, 2011
- Length: 77:41
- Label: Nappy Boy/Konvict/Jive
- Producer: Young Fyre, T-Pain, Tha Bizness, DJ Khalil, Bishop Jones, Don Cannon, Rick N Prez, Lil' C, The Inkredibles

T-Pain chronology
Three Ringz (2008)	Prevolver (2011)	Revolver (2011)

Prevolver (stylized as prEVOLVEr) is a mixtape by American singer T-Pain. The prequel to his album, Revolver, the mixtape was released on May 4, 2011, for free download on the Nappy Boy website. The mixtape contains 30 tracks with guest appearances from Lil Wayne, Birdman, 2 Chainz, Krizz Kaliko, Bow Wow, Mistah Fab, Field Mob, Brisco, One Chance and others.

== Background ==
T-Pain held many contest during the time of recording Prevolver, the motivated contest ran for months until rappers B.Martin and P.L Official won. T-Pain later held another contest for his song "Merry Christmas", but the song ended up not being on the mixtape. After months of leaks including the song "You Copying Me", T-Pain officially released Prevolver on May 4, 2011.

== Track list ==
#	Title	Producer(s)	Guest Performer(s)
1	Speech	Young Fyre	Birdman
2	I Done Showed You	Young Fyre	Field Mob, One Chance
3	Big Man	Tha Bizness	2 Chainz
4	Hoes And Ladies	Young Fyre	Smoke, Lil Wayne
5	You Copying Me	Tha Bizness	
6	Danger	Young Fyre	
7	Muffuga	Young Fyre	
8	So Much Pain	Young Fyre	One Chance
9	The Word	DJ Khalil	
10	Test Drive	Don Cannon	
11	Money on the Flo	Tha Bizness	Mistah Fab
12	What?	Young Fyre	
13	Depressing	T-Pain	Tay Dizm
14	Motivated	Young Fyre	P.L. Official, B. Martin
15	Yasimelike	Young Fyre	One Chance
16	Hit 'Em Wit It	Young Fyre	Severe
17	Nightmare	Young Fyre	One Chance
18	Money Dance	Young Fyre	One Chance
19	Bring It Back	Rick N Prez	Tay Dizm
20	Fantasy	Bishop Jones	Dawn
21	Open	DJ Khalil	
22	I'll Make U	Tha Bizness	
23	Have It	T-Pain	
24	I Might Have to Go	T-Pain, Lil' C	One Chance
25	I'm Just Sayin	Young Fyre	
26	What's the Bidness	T-Pain	
27	Out the Hood	Young Fyre	Brisco, Young Cash
28	Top Flight Sex (Of the World)	Young Fyre	Young Cash
29	Keep It Coming	Lee Major The Inkredibles	
30	Welcome Home	DJ Khalil	Krizz Kaliko, Bow Wow
