= Revolver (T-Pain album) =

2011 album by T-Pain

Studio album by T-Pain
- Released: December 6, 2011
- Recorded: 2009–2011
- Genres: Pop; R&B; electropop
- Length: 52:53
- Labels: Nappy Boy; Konvict; RCA
- Producers: Rocco Did It Again! (exec.); Michael Blumstein (exec.); T-Pain (also exec.); Young Fyre; Detail; Chuckie; Greg Kurstin; John Shanks; T-Minus; Billboard; Tha Bizness; Dr. Luke; Cirkut; Fabian Lenssen; Catalyst; Get Cool; David "Preach" Balfour

T-Pain chronology
prEVOLVEr (2011)	Revolver (2011)	Stoic (2012)

Singles from Revolver
- 1. "Best Love Song" Released: March 22, 2011; 2. "5 O'Clock" Released: September 27, 2011; 3. "Turn All the Lights On" Released: January 17, 2012

Revolver (stylized as REVOLVEЯ), is the fourth studio album by American singer T-Pain, released through Konvict Muzik, RCA Records and his own label Nappy Boy Entertainment on December 6, 2011. It is his first album released after the dissolution of his previous label, Jive Records. Recording sessions for the album have taken place from 2009 to 2011. T-Pain stated that the two R's in the word, RevolveЯ have been capitalized so that in the middle, it says "evolve", indicating that T-Pain has evolved as an artist, and as a person in the period from Thr33 Ringz up till RevolveЯ. He later stated that the R's were put to show how people can be deceived, and understand things incorrectly without looking at the inside of things and this is the scheme of the album.

T-Pain announced that the album would be released on December 6 in the United States in an interview with Lady Jade on the F.A.M.E. tour bus, coincidentally this is the same release date of his first album, Rappa Ternt Sanga back in 2005. The singles "Take Your Shirt Off", "Reverse Cowgirl" and "Rap Song" (featuring Rick Ross) were released intended for inclusion on the album; however, due to poor chart performance, these songs would instead be re-dubbed as promotional singles.

== Background ==
Work began on the album, originally titled UBER, during 2009, and the album was initially intended to be released during 2010. However, the album suffered a series of delays; although T-Pain claimed the album had been completed and mastered, he rescheduled the album's release date, to reflect his displeasure at generally falling music sales, which frustrated several fans. Despite this, he has since claimed that he would release the album when his account on the social networking site Twitter reaches a million "followers". T-Pain initially denied that Jay-Z's song "D.O.A. (Death of Autotune)" put him off from using Auto-Tune, the vocal pitch correcting technology he has frequently used throughout his previous work, he later confirmed that there would be a higher presence of Auto-Tune on the album, and later revealed he had stopped using the technology permanently and would rather use his own new version of it, called the T-Pain Effect, after leaving Antares Audio Technologies and signing with iZotope and using his very own "I Am T-Pain" microphone.

In June 2010, T-Pain confirmed that the album had been completed and mastered, but that it will not be released until album sales increase. T-Pain posted on Twitter stating he would release his PrEVOLVEr mixtape when he gets 500,000 followers and release his album RevolveR when he gets 1,000,000 followers. He released his first single for the album "Best Love Song" with Chris Brown on March 22, 2011, after his three singles "Reverse Cowgirl", "Take Your Shirt Off" and "Rap Song" featuring American rapper Rick Ross did not chart well, releasing them as promotional singles instead. T-Pain stated that after Jay-Z released "D.O.A. (Death of Auto-Tune)", the first single from The Blueprint 3, his 2009 album, he would still continue using autotune and release his new album UBER.

In an interview with Ryan Seacrest, T-Pain confirmed that he was working on a song with singer Kesha and rapper Pitbull to be featured on the album. T-Pain later renamed the album RevolveR and expected to release his album in 2010. T-Pain stated that he had to cut many guest spots on the album, calling his last album from 2008, Thr33 Ringz, a possible DJ Khaled album because of all the guest appearances. Chris Brown, Wiz Khalifa, Lily Allen, Pitbull, One Chance, Lil Wayne, Detail and Ne-Yo have all been confirmed features for the album. T-Pain released his highly anticipated prequel to RevolveR on May 4, 2011, with over 30 tracks entitled prEVOLVEr. On October 7, RCA Music Group announced it was disbanding Jive Records along with Arista Records and J Records. With the shutdown, T-Pain would release RevolveЯ on the RCA Records brand.

== Title ==
In terms of the album title, T-Pain has stated: "There's a lotta people who, when they first find out about T-Pain, judge me before they know what I got goin' on or what my music is all ABOUT... So the reason I chose "rEVOLVEr" as the title and spelt it the way I have, is basically to show how people can be deceived and misjudge something before they look at it PROPERLY. Like when people hear the word "revolver" they immediately think "violence" - which is what a lotta people think when they first see ME! Whereas when they look more closely at the title and they see the "r"s are faded out, they'll realise that in the middle it's actually saying "EVOLVE". Which in turn sheds a different light on the whole of the album... Because what it actually represents is how I've evolved as an artist and a person between my last album and THIS one."

== Singles ==
On March 22, the first official single "Best Love Song" was released. The song features singer Chris Brown. It was produced by Young Fyre. The song peaked at number thirty-three on the Billboard Hot 100. The music video was released on May 25 via YouTube.

On September 8, the second official single "5 O'Clock", sampling "Who'd Have Known" by Lily Allen, was released. The song features Wiz Khalifa, and Lily Allen; it peaked in the United States at ten as well as charting worldwide. On September 30, T-Pain's birthday, the official music video for "5 O'Clock" was released via YouTube.

On January 17, 2012, "Turn All the Lights On" was solicited to urban radio as the album's third single. The song features singer Ne-Yo.

=== Other songs ===
In the beginning, T-Pain was originally given six consecutive singles for the album. The first single was supposed to be "Take Your Shirt Off", but was dubbed as a promotional single due to low charting. Another single, "Reverse Cowgirl", was released, which originally featured rapper Young Jeezy, and was dubbed as a promotional single also due to low charting. During a performance, T-Pain debuted yet another "supposed first single" entitled "Rap Song". The song, which features rapper Rick Ross, was the least successful single so far. "Booty Wurk (One Cheek at a Time)", which features Joey Galaxy and was produced by Young Fyre, was solicited to radio as a single on June 7, 2011 and was released to the iTunes Store on July 8, 2011.

The official remix for "Bang Bang Pow Pow" was released in early 2012 and features American rapper Nelly.

== Reception ==
=== Critical response ===
Professional ratings
Aggregate scores
Source	Rating
Metacritic	56/100
Review scores
Source	Rating
AllMusic	3.5/5 stars
Entertainment Weekly	(B+)
The A.V. Club	C−
IGN	(7.5/10)
The New York Times	(mixed)
Rolling Stone	3/5 stars
Slant Magazine	2/5 stars
Toronto Star	2/4 stars
musicOMH	1.5/5 stars
NME	2.5/5 stars

RevolveЯ received mixed reviews from music critics. At Metacritic, which assigns a normalized rating out of 100 to reviews from mainstream critics, the album received an average score of 56, based on thirteen reviews, which indicates "mixed or average reviews". Slant Magazine's Jesse Cataldo staded that it lacked "spark, life, or individual charm" and noted a "complete absence of evolution" by T-Pain. Mikael Wood of Entertainment Weekly stated that "gorgeous robo-soul ballads like "Rock Bottom" and the Twitter romance "Default Picture" feel as intimate as the work of any bedroom troubadour". AllMusic editor David Jeffries noted that the album was "entirely less conceptual than his previous effort", but T-Pain's "gigantic producer hat remains off save a handful of cuts", and the album "still feels like a circus". Jon Caramanica of The New York Times commented that the album "lacks sui generis charm and shock", and stated, "There aren’t many obvious envelopes left to push in hip-hop and R&B, but T-Pain is still seeking out untrammeled ground".

=== Commercial performance ===
The album debuted at #28 on the Billboard 200 with 35,000 copies sold in its first week. As of June 2012, the album has sold 110,076 copies. It also entered at number seven on Billboard's R&B/Hip-Hop Albums and at number nine on its Digital Albums chart.

== Track listing ==
No.	Title	Writer(s)	Producer(s)	Length
1.	"Bang Bang Pow Pow" (featuring Lil Wayne)	Faheem Najm; Tyler Williams; Dwayne Carter, Jr.	T-Minus	3:41
2.	"Bottlez" (featuring Detail)	Najm; Mitch Cohn; Noel Fisher	Catalyst; Detail (co.)	3:06
3.	"It's Not You (It's Me)" (T-Pain vs. Chuckie featuring Pitbull)	Najm; Armando Perez; Clyde Narain; Fabian Lenssen	DJ Chuckie; Fabian Lenssen; T-Pain (co.)	3:38
4.	"Default Picture"	Najm; Tramaine Winfrey; Jon Gordon; Michael Aaron Gordon; Donald Cook, Jr.	Young Fyre	3:06
5.	"5 O'Clock" (featuring Lily Allen and Wiz Khalifa)	Najm; Cameron Thomaz; Lily Allen; Gary Barlow; Howard Donald; Greg Kurstin; Jason Orange; Mark Owen; Stephen Robson	T-Pain	4:41
6.	"Sho-Time (Pleasure Thang)"	Najm; David Balfour	T-Pain; David "Preach" Bal4 (co.)	3:52
7.	"Rock Bottom"	Najm; Balfour	T-Pain	4:25
8.	"Look at Her Go" (featuring Chris Brown)	Najm; Mathieu Jomphe; Christopher Brown	Billboard	2:59
9.	"Mix'd Girl"	Najm; Christopher Whitacre; Justin Henderson	Tha Bizness	4:10
10.	"I Don't Give a Fuk"	Najm; Winfrey; J. Gordon; M. A. Gordon; Cook	Young Fyre	3:45
11.	"Drowning Again" (featuring One Chance)	Najm	T-Pain	5:23
12.	"When I Come Home"	Najm; Balfour	T-Pain	3:16
13.	"Best Love Song" (featuring Chris Brown)	Najm; Winfrey; Brown	Young Fyre	3:16
14.	"Turn All the Lights On" (featuring Ne-Yo)	Najm; Lukasz Gottwald; Shaffer Smith; Henry Walter	Dr. Luke; Cirkut	3:37
Total length:				52:53

Deluxe edition bonus tracks
No.	Title	Writer(s)	Producer(s)	Length
15.	"Center of the Stage" (featuring R. Kelly and Bei Maejor)	Najm; Willie Poole; Robert Kelly; Brandon Green	Get Cool; T-Pain	3:48
16.	"Regular Girl"	Najm	T-Pain	3:12
17.	"Nuthin'" (featuring E-40 and Detail)	Najm; Winfrey; Fisher; Earl Stevens	Young Fyre	3:25

Expanded edition bonus tracks
No.	Title	Writer(s)	Producer(s)	Length
18.	"Turn All the Lights On (Bakaboyz Remix)" (featuring Ne-Yo)	Najm; Gottwald; Smith; Walter	Bakaboyz	4:06
19.	"5 O'Clock (Remix)" (featuring Lily Allen and Wisin & Yandel)	Najm; Thomaz; Allen; Barlow; Donald; Kurstin; Orange; Owen; Robson	T-Pain	4:21
20.	"Rap Song" (featuring Rick Ross)	Najm; Carter; William Roberts; Winfrey	Young Fyre; T-Pain (co.)	3:58

Sample credits

- "5 O'Clock" contains a sample from "Who'd Have Known", as performed by Lily Allen; written by Lily Allen, Gary Barlow, Howard Donald, Greg Kurstin, Jason Orange, Mark Owen, and Stephen Robson, whose chorus in turn contains an interpolation of Take That's "Shine".

== Chart positions ==
Chart (2011)	Peak position
Australian Urban Albums Chart	21
German Newcomers Chart	5
Japanese Albums Chart	49
UK R&B Albums Chart	26
US Billboard 200	28
US Top R&B/Hip-Hop Albums	7

== Certifications ==
Certifications
Region	Certification	Certified units/sales
New Zealand (RMNZ)	Gold	7,500^{‡}
^{‡} Sales+streaming figures based on certification alone.
