= Reverse Cowgirl (song) =

2010 song performed by T-Pain

Promotional single by T-Pain
- Released: March 19, 2010
- Recorded: 2010
- Length: 3:48 (album version); 4:16 (remix version)
- Label: Nappy Boy/Konvict/Jive
- Songwriters: Faheem Najm, Michael A. Gordon, Jon A. Gordon (The Gordon Brothers), Daniel Johnson, Jeremy Coleman, Jaylien, Juan Luis Morera, Llandel Veguilla
- Producers: Kane Beatz, JMIKE

"Reverse Cowgirl" is a song recorded by American singer T-Pain. It originally served as the second promotional single off T-Pain's fourth studio album RevolveЯ, but never made it on the track list. Originally featuring a verse from Young Jeezy, this was later cut and replaced with a bridge sung by T-Pain, and backgrounds sung by Jon A. Gordon, Michael A. Gordon (The Gordon Brothers), and Courtney Vantrease, Robert Brent (One Chance).

== Music video ==
The music video was released on March 18, and was directed by Jeremy Rall. T-Pain's comment of the video: "It's all about art. I wanted to do something different."

== Remix ==
The official remix featuring the duo Wisin & Yandel, premiered on August 21 by the program El Coyote The Show, the reggaeton station 94 of Puerto Rico, the song was included on their live album La Revolución: Live.

== Charts ==
On the week ending April 10, 2010, "Reverse Cowgirl" debuted at number 75 on the US Billboard Hot 100. The song also charted at number 22 on the Australian ARIA Urban Charts, for the week beginning April 11.

Chart performance for "Reverse Cowgirl"
| Chart (2010) | Peak position |
|---|---|
| Australia (ARIA) | 79 |
| Australia Urban Singles (ARIA) | 22 |
| US Billboard Hot 100 | 75 |
| US Hot R&B/Hip-Hop Songs (Billboard) | 64 |
