= Take Your Shirt Off =

Promotional single by T-Pain
- Released: October 9, 2009
- Recorded: 2009
- Genre: Hip hop, crunk
- Length: 3:49
- Label: Jive Records
- Songwriters: Faheem Najm, Byron Thomas, David Balfour
- Producers: Mannie Fresh, T-Pain, Qua z mo

"Take Your Shirt Off" is a song by American singer T-Pain. It originally served as the first promotional single off T-Pain's fourth studio album RevolveЯ, but never made it on the track list. It was released on iTunes for purchase on October 9, 2009.

== Background ==
The song was originally inspired by Petey Pablo's hip-hop song "Raise Up", and the part of the song included Pablo telling his native peers "take your shirt off, twist it 'round yo' head, spin it like a helicopter," and the same words were used on T-Pain's version (with the addition of the word motherfucker, although it is slightly muted). The lyrics of the song are written by T-Pain, credited under his real name. Mannie Fresh & Qua z mo was the producers for the song. The music was featured in a trailer for Step Up 3-D. It was also used for the soundtrack of the film Lottery Ticket

== Music video ==
The music video was released on December 2, 2009 on YouTube. Cameo appearances were made by George Clinton, Tay Dizm, Young Ca$h, Sophia Fresh, Rick Ross, Petey Pablo, Rebekah Leake and Brett Frantz. The video was directed by Gil Green and shot entirely in Tallahassee.

== Chart performance ==
The song debuted at #80 on the Billboard Hot 100, and at #23 on the Australian ARIA Urban Charts.

== Popular culture ==
The song is used on the official trailer for Step Up 3D. It was also used in the film Lottery Ticket starring T-Pain himself.

== Charts ==
Chart (2009)	Peak position
Australia (ARIA)	42
Australia Urban (ARIA)	9
ERROR in "CIS": Invalid position: 249. Expected number 1–200 or dash (–).
UK Singles (OCC)	159
US Billboard Hot 100	80

=== Year-end charts ===
Chart (2010)	Position
Australian Singles Chart	97
