= T-Pain =

American singer and rapper (born 1984)

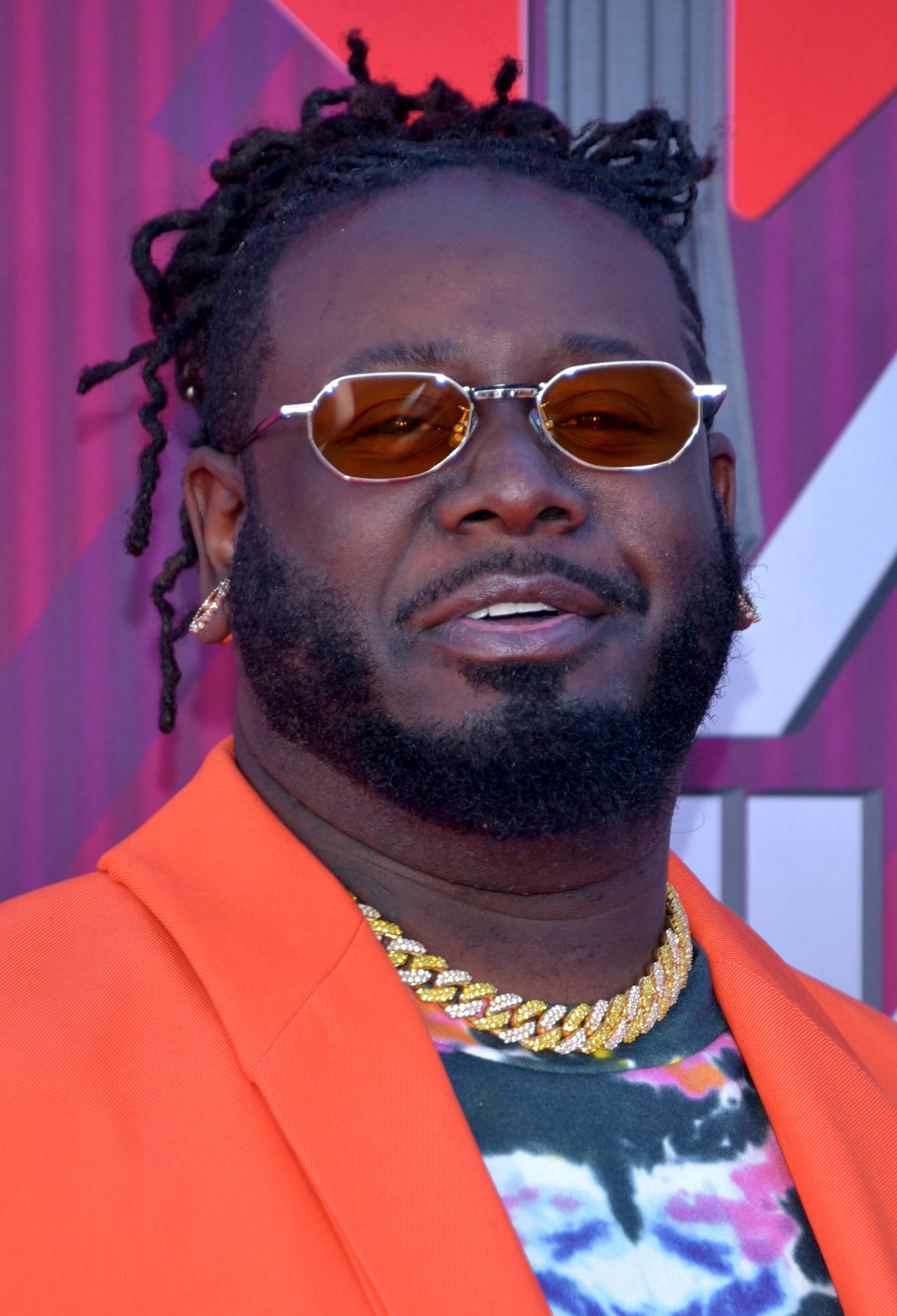
- T-Pain in 2019

Background information
- Also known as: Teddy Verseti; Teddy Penderazdoun; Teddy Pain; Theophilus Ezekiel Pain
- Born: Faheem Rashad Najm; September 30, 1984 (age 42); Tallahassee, Florida, U.S.
- Genres: R&B; hip-hop
- Occupations: Singer; rapper; songwriter; record producer; actor
- Works: Discography; production
- Years active: 1999–present
- Labels: Cinematic (former); Nappy Boy; Konvict; RCA; Jive
- Spouse: Amber Najm (m. 2003)
- Children: 3
- Website: tpain.com

Logo
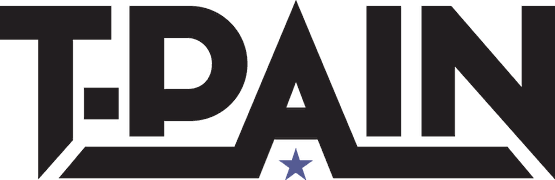

Faheem Rashad Najm (born September 30, 1984), known professionally as T-Pain, is an American singer, rapper, songwriter, and record producer. He is known for pioneering the creative use of Auto-Tune pitch correction, often used with extreme parameter settings to create electronic-styled vocal performances. Blending its use with R&B and hip-hop sensibilities, T-Pain played a key role in defining rap-singing throughout the 2000s.

T-Pain began his recording career as part of the hip-hop group Nappy Headz. He self-released his debut solo mixtape, Back @ It, in 2004, and signed with Akon's Konvict Muzik, in a joint venture with Jive Records, the following year. His 2005 debut single, "I'm Sprung", was quickly met with commercial success, peaking at number eight on the Billboard Hot 100 and receiving platinum certification by the Recording Industry Association of America (RIAA). Its follow-up, "I'm 'n Luv (wit a Stripper)" (featuring Mike Jones), peaked at number five on the chart; both served as lead singles for his debut studio album, Rappa Ternt Sanga (2005). Despite mixed critical reception, his second album, Epiphany (2007), peaked atop the US Billboard 200 and spawned the Billboard Hot 100-number one single "Buy U a Drank (Shawty Snappin')" (featuring Yung Joc), as well as the top-40 single, "Bartender" (featuring Akon). His third album, Three Ringz (2008), was preceded by the single "Can't Believe It" (featuring Lil Wayne), and his fourth album, Revolver (2011), was preceded by "5 O'Clock" (featuring Wiz Khalifa and Lily Allen). His fifth album, Oblivion (2017) sustained long-term delays and was met with critical and commercial failure, serving as his final release on a major label.

Meanwhile, T-Pain saw continued success as a guest performer on nine Hot 100-top ten singles—"Shawty" by Plies, "Cyclone" by Baby Bash, "Good Life" by Kanye West, "Shawty Get Loose" by Lil Mama, "Got Money" by Lil Wayne, "Blame It" by Jamie Foxx, and "Hey Baby (Drop It to the Floor)" by Pitbull—which includes two singles that peaked the chart: "Kiss Kiss" by Chris Brown and "Low" by Flo Rida. The latter was named third in the Billboard Hot 100 Songs of the Decade and received diamond (10× platinum) certification by the RIAA. "Good Life" and "Blame It" both won Grammy Awards for Best Rap Song and Best Rap/Sung Performance, respectively, from T-Pain's total of 12 nominations for the award. Outside of music, he founded the record label Nappy Boy Entertainment in 2005, which has signed fellow rapper Travie McCoy. He has produced and written material for other artists, and voice-acted in film and television including Tom & Jerry, Freaknik: The Musical, The Cleveland Show, Squidbillies, and We Bare Bears.

== Early life ==
Faheem Rashad Najm was born and raised in Tallahassee, Florida, to parents Aliyah, a Bahamian chef, and Shasheem, who founded the Homeboyz to Men program. Najm was brought up in a Muslim household, but he has expressed his lack of interest in the concept of religion. At three years old, he got his first taste of the music business when a friend of the family, gospel jazz artist and producer Ben Tankard, allowed him to spend time and "twist the knobs" at his recording studio. At age ten, Najm turned his bedroom into a music studio, using a keyboard, a beat machine, and a four-track recorder.

== Career ==
=== 1999–2006: Early career and Rappa Ternt Sanga ===
T-Pain joined the rap group Nappy Headz in 1999. Through a mutual connection with music promoter TJ Chapman, he was discovered by Rocco Did It Again! and Mike Blumstein—co-founders of the independent record label Chase Entertainment—to whom he signed. His stage name is short for "Tallahassee Pain", and was chosen because of the hardships he experienced while living there. He released his debut mixtape, Back @ It in 2004, and later released the song "I'm Fucked Up", a slightly altered cover version of Akon's then-popular 2004 single, "Locked Up". Akon himself came across the song and immediately offered T-Pain a deal with his label, Konvict Muzik. While T-Pain was offered other record deals, with the highest-bidding being US$900,000, Akon promised the young artist a personal mentorship in the industry. Meanwhile, Blumstein and Rocco remained involved in T-Pain's careers as joint co-managers. Afterward, T-Pain began singing instead of rapping, and used this inspiration to begin recording for his debut studio album, Rappa Ternt Sanga. Released on December 6, 2005, through a joint venture with Jive Records, the album reached number 33 on the Billboard 200, and has since received gold certification by the Recording Industry Association of America (RIAA).

The album was supported by T-Pain's debut commercial single, "I'm Sprung", which was released in August 2005 and peaked at number eight on the Billboard Hot 100, as well as number nine on the Hot R&B/Hip-Hop Songs chart. Its follow-up, "I'm 'n Luv (wit a Stripper)" (featuring Mike Jones), served as the album's second single; it was released in December of that year and peaked at number five on the former chart, and number ten on the latter. The third and final single from the album, "Studio Luv", was released in October 2006 and failed to chart.

=== 2007–2008: Epiphany ===
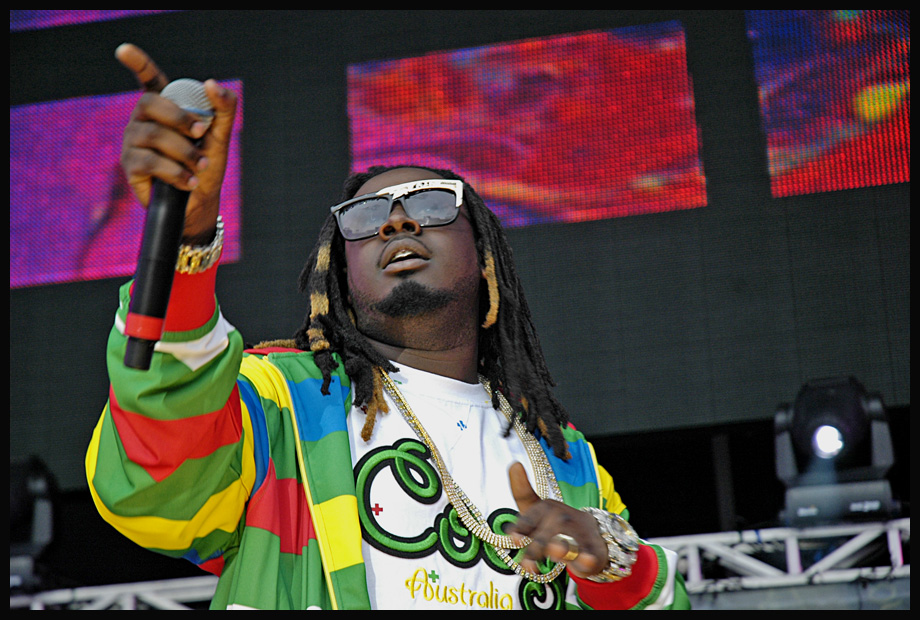
T-Pain performing at the 2007 Hot 97 Summer Jam concert

In mid-2006, T-Pain began work on his second album, now with the Zomba Label Group as well as his previous labels. The album, titled Epiphany, was released on June 5, 2007. The album sold 171,000 records in its first week, reaching number one on the Billboard 200. The record has since sold 819,000 records in the United States.

The album was preceded by the lead single "Buy U a Drank (Shawty Snappin')" (featuring Yung Joc), released in February 2007. The song reached number one on both the Hot 100 and Hot R&B/Hip-Hop Songs chart, becoming his first to peak atop both charts. The album's second single, "Bartender" (featuring Akon), was released in June 2007 and reached number five on the Hot 100 and number nine on the Hot R&B/Hip-Hop Songs chart. The third and final single from the album, "Church", was released in October 2007 and failed to chart in the United States.

Speaking in May 2007 to Pete Lewis of Blues & Soul about his reason for naming his second album 'Epiphany', T-Pain stated: "One of the two dictionary meanings of epiphany is 'a sudden moment of insight or revelation'. And to me the title 'Epiphany' signifies the moment I realized that, to make the best music I can, I needed to just go in the studio and be myself, and not concentrate so hard on following other people's formulas." While promoting his second album, T-Pain made guest appearances on multiple songs by other artists. T-Pain was featured on "I'm a Flirt" (remix) by R. Kelly, "Outta My System" by Bow Wow, "Baby Don't Go" by Fabolous, "I'm So Hood" by DJ Khaled, "Shawty" by Plies, "Kiss Kiss" by Chris Brown, "Low" by Flo Rida, and "Good Life" by Kanye West. For two weeks in late 2007, T-Pain was featured on four top ten singles simultaneously on the Hot 100 chart.

His performance on West's "Good Life" won the BET Award for Best Collaboration and was nominated in several other categories. In 2008, the song won a Grammy Award for Best Rap Song.

=== 2007–2009: Three Ringz ===
In 2007, T-Pain began work on his third album, Three Ringz with Rocco Valdes, Akon, and Lil Wayne. The album was also his first under his newly launched label, Nappy Boy Entertainment. Released on November 11, 2008, the album sold 168,000 records in its first week and reached number four on the Billboard 200. A mixtape, Pr33 Ringz, was released in early 2008 for the album's promotion.

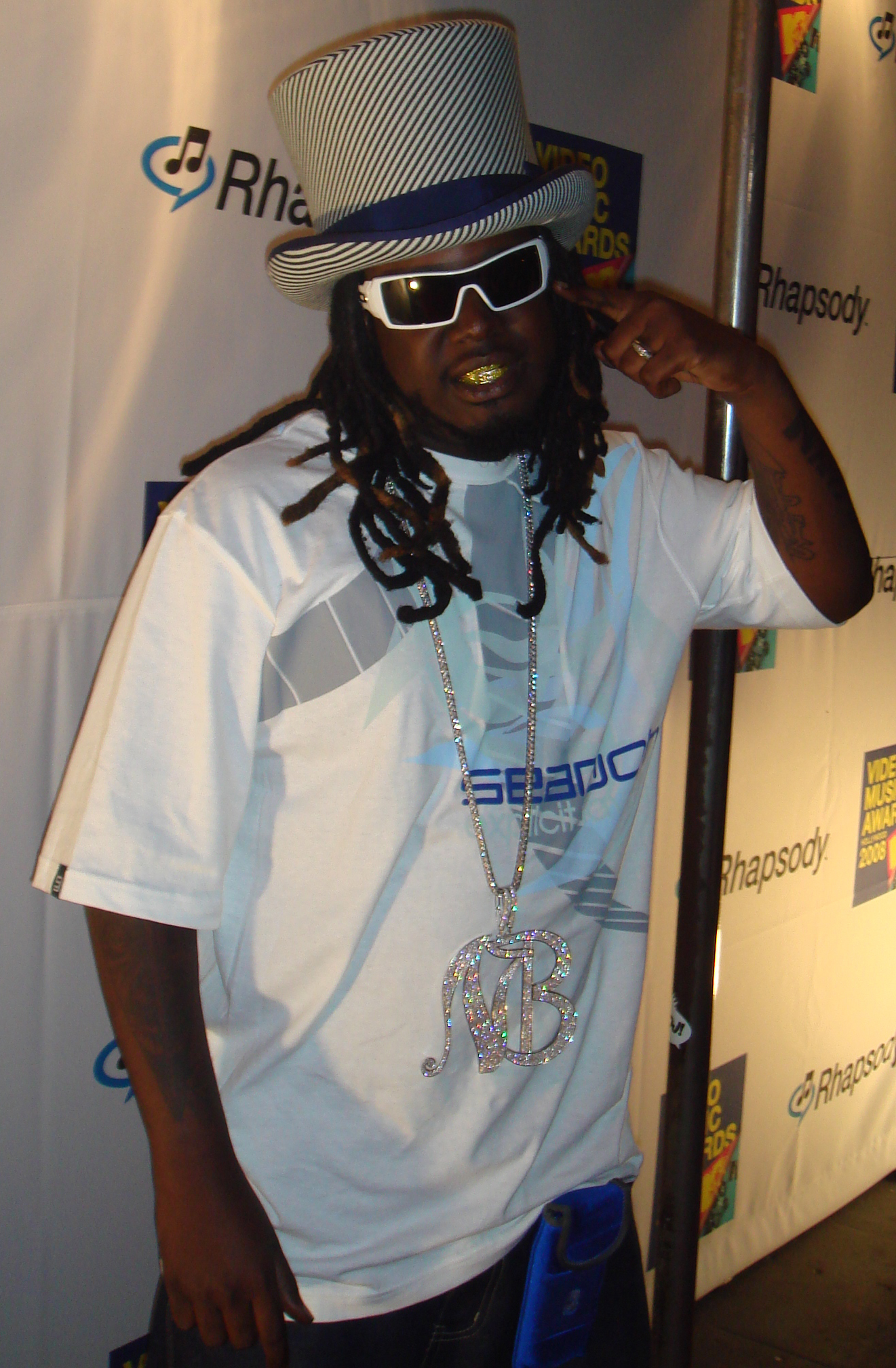
T-Pain in 2008

Three Ringz was preceded by three singles; its lead single, "Can't Believe It" (featuring Lil Wayne), was released in July 2008 and reached number seven on the Hot 100 and number two on the Hot R&B/Hip-Hop Songs chart. The album's second single, "Chopped 'n' Skrewed" (featuring Ludacris), was released in September 2008; it reached number 27 on the Hot 100 and number three on the Hot R&B/Hip-Hop Songs chart. The third and final single from the album, "Freeze" (featuring Chris Brown), was released in October 2008; it reached number 38 on the Hot 100 and number 39 on the Hot R&B/Hip-Hop Songs chart. Guest appearances on Three Ringz include T.I., Lil Wayne, Ludacris, DJ Khaled, Ciara, Chris Brown, and Kanye West, among others.

In 2008, T-Pain continued to guest perform on numerous singles, such as "She Got It" by 2 Pistols, "Go Girl" by Ciara, "The Boss" by Rick Ross, "Cash Flow" by Ace Hood, "Shawty Get Loose" by Lil Mama, "One More Drink" by Ludacris, and "Go Hard" by DJ Khaled. T-Pain and Ludacris collaborated to perform "Chopped 'n' Skrewed" and "One More Drink" on American late-night television programs Jimmy Kimmel Live! on ABC in November 2008 and on NBC's Saturday Night Live in the same month. T-Pain appeared again on SNL in February 2009 (season 34, episode 15, hosted by Bradley Cooper with musical guest TV on the Radio) as a feature in the Digital Short premiere of The Lonely Island's single, "I'm on a Boat," off their album Incredibad. T-Pain also supported the album in 2009 with his Thr33 Ringz Tour, which included sold-out shows across North America. T-Pain and Lil Wayne formed the duo T-Wayne in 2008. The duo released a self-titled mixtape in late 2008; it charted on the Billboard 200 in January 2009. Their debut album was going to be released in 2009, but never was.

=== 2009–2012: Revolver ===
He collaborated with Taylor Swift for the CMT Music Awards, performing "Thug Story", a parody of Swift's hit single "Love Story". In an interview with MTV, T-Pain announced that he would release his fourth studio album in November 2009 and that its title would be UBER. He stated that although he originally wanted to release the album in the summer of 2010, his label had pushed the release forward. However, the album was not released in 2009.

An iPhone application called "I Am T-Pain", featuring an auto tuner, allowing fans to record and modify their own voice to accompany an instrumental collection of T-Pain's music, was released in September 2009. In July 2009, T-Pain endorsed the 2009 T-Pain Killa Cam-Pain, a grassroots effort to help him become elected as president of Florida State University.

In November 2009, T-Pain released the first single from his fourth studio album, "Take Your Shirt Off". The single only managed to reach number eighty on the Hot 100, and was later dubbed a promotional single. In February 2010, he released "Reverse Cowgirl" (featuring Young Jeezy), which was the official lead single from his fourth studio album. He later release an updated version of the song excluding Young Jeezy's verse and adding a new bridge. The single reached number seventy-five on the Hot 100 and number sixty-four on the Hot R&B/Hip-Hop Songs chart, becoming a mild hit. The single has since been dubbed a promotional single. T-Pain was later featured on the "We Are the World 25 for Haiti" single in February 2010, which reached number two on the Hot 100. In March 2010, T-Pain developed and starred in Adult Swim's animated musical special, Freaknik: The Musical.

T-Pain released a mixtape on his Nappy Boy label in February 2010, T-Pain Presents: Nappy Boy All Stars Vol.1, which contained remixes of songs including "Forever" by Drake. On May 5, 2011, he announced another mixtape, Prevolver, serving as a predecessor to his album. The mixtape including collaborations from artists such as Lil Wayne and Field Mob. In June 2010, T-Pain confirmed that his fourth studio album, now titled Revolver, had been completed and mastered, but that it would not be released until album sales increase. T-Pain's first feature film, Lottery Ticket, was released on August 20, 2010. In October 2010, T-Pain release his third promotional single, "Rap Song". The song charted poorly, peaking at 89 on the Hot 100.

T-Pain was featured on the hit single "All I Do Is Win" by DJ Khaled, along with the remix. He featured on Wisin & Yandel's single "Imaginate" and Bun B's single "Trillionaire". In the last two quarters of 2010, he was featured on the hit singles "Hey Baby (Drop It to the Floor)" by Pitbull, and "Move That Body" by Nelly. He was also featured on another single by Wisin & Yandel along with 50 Cent called "No Dejemos Que se Apague". The last two singles T-Pain was featured on in 2010 were the official remixes to "Black and Yellow" by Wiz Khalifa and "Loving You No More" by Diddy – Dirty Money.

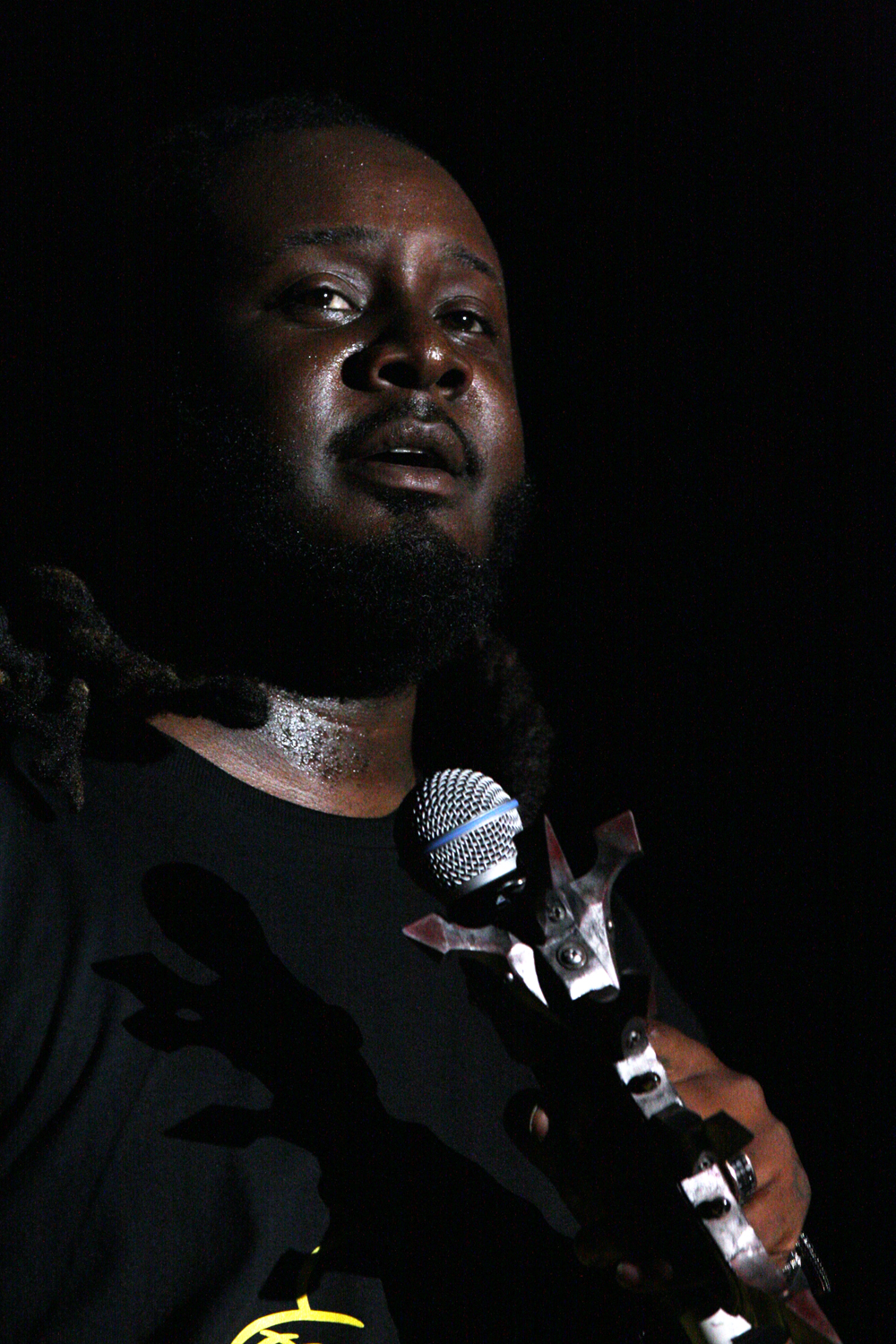
T-Pain performing at Supafest in 2012

T-Pain was featured on the first single by DJ Khaled called "Welcome to My Hood" off his 2011 album We the Best Forever. The song featured him along with Rick Ross, Plies, and Lil Wayne. He was also featured on albums such as Drake's Take Care, Lil Wayne's Tha Carter IV, and Tech N9ne's All 6's and 7's. A new toy called "iAm T-Pain Microphone" was released in 2011, at the price of $39.99. On January 29, 2011, T-Pain was featured on Italian DJ Benny Benassi's song "Electroman", released as the third single in the album of the same name. In January, JRandall released a single, "Can't Sleep", featuring T-Pain. On March 22, 2011, the next single from Revolver, "Best Love Song" (featuring Chris Brown), was released. On Twitter, T-Pain stated that he would release his mixtape Prevolver when he got 500,000 followers and release his album Revolver when he got 1,000,000 followers. Also in 2011, he appeared on another Adult Swim series: the sixth-season premiere episode of Squidbillies, performing a version of the theme song in addition to the original song "(I Like) Drivin' In My Truck" with Unknown Hinson; this song was released in 2012 as part of the free digital album The Squidbillies Present: Music for Americans Only Made by Americans in China for Americans Only God Bless America, U.S.A. on the Adult Swim Music website.

On October 7, RCA Music Group announced it was disbanding Jive Records along with Arista and J Records. With the shutdown, T-Pain (and all other artists previously signed to these three labels) would henceforth release all material (including Revolver) on the RCA Records brand. The album Revolver was eventually released in December 2011, alongside the transatlantic Top 10 single "5 O'Clock", which features Lily Allen and Wiz Khalifa.

=== 2013–2017: Oblivion ===
On April 1, 2013, after the announcement of T-Pain cutting off his signature dreads, he announced the title of his fifth studio album, then entitled Stoicville: The Phoenix stating, "To me, a Phoenix represents new beginnings. A new era, a new life, I'm rising from the ashes." Prior to releasing his fifth studio album, he released T-Pain Presents Happy Hour, a greatest hits compilation. Its first single, "Up Down (Do This All Day)" (featuring B.o.B), produced by DJ Mustard, was officially released on August 13, 2013. The song peaked at number 62 on the Billboard Hot 100. The second single "Drankin Patna" was released a year later on July 21, 2014. On November 7, 2014, T-Pain premiered the intro and title track off of Stoicville. On November 21, 2014, T-Pain premiered "Coming Home" as the first promotional single in support of Stoicville and made it available for free on his official website.

On June 8, 2015, T-Pain released a song titled "Make That Shit Work" (featuring Juicy J). Following another delay, T-Pain confirmed the album was still on its way, missing its December 11 expected release date to further delay. On December 9, 2015, to mark the one-year anniversary of the most popular Tiny Desk Concert ever and the 10th anniversary of his debut album, Rappa Ternt Sanga, T-Pain performed a short set of some previous hits, along with a cover of "A Change Is Gonna Come" and the premiere of a new song, "Officially Yours".

On October 27, 2016, T-Pain premiered "Dan Bilzerian" (featuring Lil Yachty). He worked with Bruno Mars on his third studio album, 24K Magic, as one of the writers on the track "Straight Up & Down".

After teasing the release of a long-shelved collaboration project with Lil Wayne, T-Wayne was released on May 18, 2017, via T-Pain's SoundCloud for streaming and free digital download. It consists of eight tracks recorded in 2009 described as "lost demos". In 2017, he collaborated with Italian rappers J-Ax and Fedez for the single "Senza pagare", from the album Comunisti col Rolex. After numerous delays and project name changes, T-Pain's fifth album Oblivion was released November 17, 2017.

=== 2019: 1UP ===
On February 27, 2019, the same day T-Pain was revealed to be the winner of the first season of The Masked Singer, he released a surprise new album titled 1UP and announced a new U.S. tour in support of it. He hosted the iHeartRadio Music Awards on March 14.

In December 2020, T-Pain appeared in ComplexLand virtual event to discuss his thoughts on the future of esports.

=== 2023–present: On Top of the Covers ===
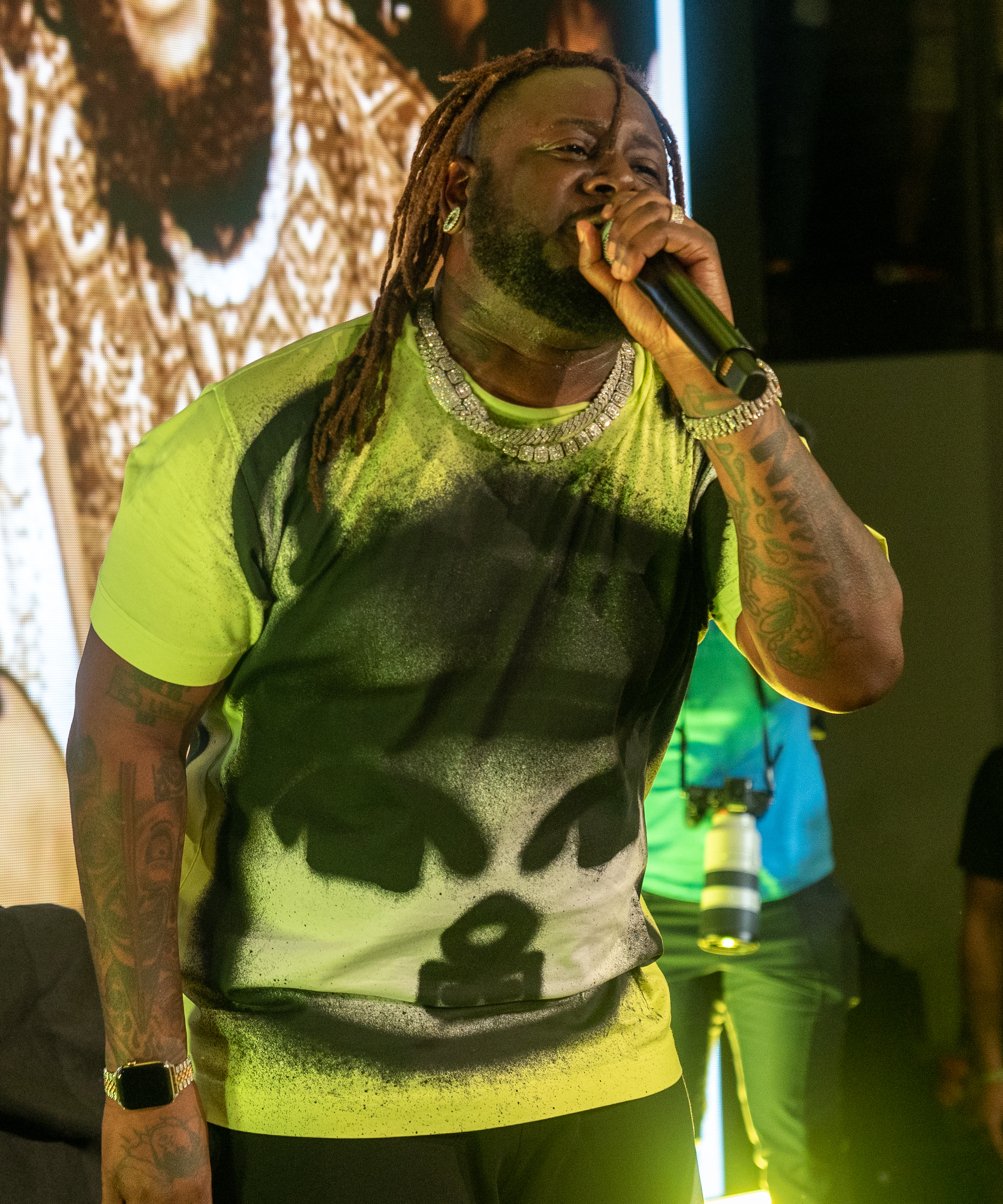
T-Pain in 2022

On March 17, 2023, T-Pain released On Top of the Covers. The album includes a selection of cover songs and notably did not include the use of autotune. He collaborated with Meghan Trainor on the single "Been Like This" from Trainor's sixth album Timeless.

In February 2024, T-Pain acknowledged that he had ghostwritten music for country singers including Rhett Akins, Luke Bryan, and Dallas Davidson while living in Nashville, Tennessee, for two years, but said that he preferred not to be credited on country songs because of the racism he experienced in the country music industry.

== Other ventures ==
=== Phone app ===
On September 24, 2009, T-Pain joined with iPhone app creator Smule to create a new app entitled "I Am T-Pain" to enable people to use his style of Auto-Tune in karaoke; it was released the following day.

=== Film and television ===
In May 2009, T-Pain made an appearance on a live-action episode of Aqua Teen Hunger Force as Frylock, where he made his debut as an actor. In late 2009, T-Pain developed a concept to create an animated television special, Freaknik: The Musical, which he submitted to Adult Swim. It premiered on March 7, 2010, and features many guest celebrities such as Lil Wayne, Young Cash, Snoop Dogg, Sophia Fresh, Rick Ross, Andy Samberg, and Charlie Murphy.

T-Pain made his cinema acting debut in the 2010 comedy film Lottery Ticket as a liquor store clerk.

In November 2016, T-Pain also appeared in an episode of the YouTube series Epic Rap Battles of History as Stevie Wonder.

T-Pain was the champion of the first season of the Fox reality music competition The Masked Singer as "Monster". He returned as a guest panelist in the sixth episode of season 3.

Since 2018, T-Pain has been the host of T-Pain's School of Business, a documentary series airing on Fuse in which T-Pain travels around the United States meeting with different entrepreneurs. The series has aired for two seasons so far: the first in 2018, which had six episodes, and the second in 2019, which had eight episodes.

=== Video games ===
T-Pain has confirmed his involvement in the development of the upcoming video game Grand Theft Auto VI, although his role has not been specified.

In February of 2026, T-Pain received a role in the Canadian video game My Singing Monsters, appearing in promotional trailers advertising the newly added Clubbox. His likeness was used in the game as a monster inspired by him with the stage name "Autotuna", although at the time it was purely for in-game advertisements and tutorials. It was later that year in April, now revealed to be named "T-Pirainha". It was made obtainable to players in both the Clubbox's third act, "Waveform", alongside Water Island.

== Musical style ==
T-Pain defined in 2005 his own music style as "Hard & B", a play on R&B. In 2024, T-Pain said that country and gospel music were major influences on his music.

He mentioned GarageBand and Logic Pro as the software he uses to produce his own beats.

=== Use of Auto-Tune ===
Musically, T-Pain is best known for popularizing the use of Auto-Tune, a pitch-correcting audio processor, for vocals, with the effect turned up to give the voice a robotic quality. He has used this effect throughout his singing career, starting in 2003. This use of Auto-Tune had been pioneered by Cher in her successful 1998 single "Believe". T-Pain, who had been looking for a way to make his voice sound unique, was inspired to use Auto-Tune after hearing the Darkchild remix of the 1999 song "If You Had My Love" by Jennifer Lopez, which makes occasional use of the effect. He was also inspired in part by a similar sound achieved by Roger Troutman in the 1980s (using a talk box) and Teddy Riley in the 1990s (using both talk boxes and vocoders).

After the success of T-Pain's first two albums, his use of Auto-Tune was replicated by a number of hip-hop artists, including Snoop Dogg on the 2007 single "Sensual Seduction", Lil Wayne on the 2008 single "Lollipop", Kanye West on the 2008 album 808s & Heartbreak (on which T-Pain served as a consultant), the Black Eyed Peas on the 2009 single "Boom Boom Pow", and Diddy – Dirty Money on the 2010 album Last Train to Paris. In a November 2008 interview, T-Pain revealed that Diddy had paid him for the right to use Auto-Tune in T-Pain's style on the then-upcoming Last Train to Paris, and he felt that other artists should do the same.

In 2009, Jay-Z released the single "D.O.A. (Death of Auto-Tune)", which criticized the practice. The song directly mentioned T-Pain, with the lyrics "You niggas singing too much/ Get back to rap, you T-Paining too much." Jay-Z has insisted that the song was not a personal attack on T-Pain, and that he was simply criticizing a trend that he felt had run its course. T-Pain has said that he loved the song. However, he felt personally hurt by a general backlash against the use of Auto-Tune that began at around the same time. Nevertheless, he has continued to use Auto-Tune, feeling that it is simply part of his musical style, as opposed to jumping on a trend as was the case for other artists.

== Personal life ==
T-Pain has been married to Amber since 2003. They have three children: one daughter, Lyriq, and two sons Muziq and Kaydnz Kodah (born May 2009).

On March 27, 2009, T-Pain was involved in a golf cart accident, the same day he was due for a music video shoot for Lil' Kim's song "Download". He suffered cuts, bruises, and four missing teeth and had emergency dental work done. He returned to performing two days later.

On April 1, 2013, T-Pain revealed that he had cut off his iconic dreadlocks, stating "We must all learn to adjust with our surroundings. Those who get stuck doing the same things for too long are bound to get left behind the strong who press on & reinvent themselves. Also good news hair grows back."

On August 30, 2016, T-Pain's niece, Javona Glover, was stabbed to death in a local Walgreens store in his hometown of Tallahassee. In 2017, a suspect in the case was found dead in an apparent suicide.

T-Pain's brother died in early 2019.

T-Pain is an avid gamer who regularly streams on Twitch. He joined the platform in 2015 and as of 2025 has 1 million followers on the service, while holding numerous events in collaboration with the platform. He is friends with MoistCr1tikal, having appeared in his streams occasionally and stood in for him in a single video (while MoistCr1tikal humorously feigned retirement) in 2025. In July 2026, he served on the faculty for the second installment of Kai Cenat's Streamer University creator bootcamp, acting as the Club Director of Musical Arts to help students create a theme song for the event. He has many tattoos, some of which are internet memes or otherwise Internet-related.

== Legal issues ==
On April 28, 2007, T-Pain refused to shorten his performance at Radio One's Spring Fest Concert in Miami, which caused police presence to increase backstage. After concert officials aborted his performance of "Buy U a Drank (Shawty Snappin')", police chased him and his entourage off-stage and out of the premises and detained them.

In June 2007, a warrant was issued for T-Pain's arrest for driving with a suspended license. He subsequently turned himself in to the Leon County Jail on November 2, 2007. He was held without bail, but was released three hours later.

== Discography ==
Studio albums

- Rappa Ternt Sanga (2005)
- Epiphany (2007)
- Three Ringz (2008)
- Revolver (2011)
- Oblivion (2017)
- 1UP (2019)
- On Top of the Covers (2023)

== Filmography ==
=== Film ===
Year	Title	Role	Notes	Ref.
2010	Freaknik: The Musical	The Ghost of Freaknik Past	Voice	
2010	Lottery Ticket	Junior		
2015	Furious 7	Himself		
2016	The Boss	Himself		
2016	Ghostmates	Himself		
2021	Tom & Jerry	Singing voice of Tom Cat		
2026	Don't Move	Joey Di Rigolo		
2026	The Bartender from Obsession	Himself	Short film	

=== Television ===
Year	Title	Role	Notes	Ref.
2008	BET Hip Hop Awards	Host		
2008	MTV Cribs			
2008	Saturday Night Live	Musical guest	Episode: "Tim McGraw/Ludacris & T-Pain"	
2009	Aqua Teen Hunger Force	Frylock (live-action)	Episode: "Last Last One Forever and Ever"	
2009	CMT Music Awards	Himself		
2009	Robot Chicken	Roadblock/Lil' Jen	Voice; episode: "The Ramblings of Maurice"	
2011	Squidbillies	Himself	Voice; episode: "Asbestos I Can"	
2011–2013	The Cleveland Show	Theodore	Voice; 6 episodes	
2012	Behind the Music			
2013–2016	The Eric Andre Show	Himself	2 episodes	
2014	Celebrities Undercover			
2015	Wild 'n Out			
2016	Comedy Bang! Bang!	Himself	Episode: "T-Pain Wears Shredded Jeans and a Printed Shirt"	
2016	Epic Rap Battles of History	Stevie Wonder	Web series, "Wonder Woman vs. Stevie Wonder"	
2018	We Bare Bears	Himself	Voice; episode: "The Limo"	
2019	The Masked Singer	Monster/Himself	Season 1 winner	
2020	Bar Rescue	Himself	Episode: "Sactown Going Down"	
2021	This Is Pop	Himself	Episode: "Auto-Tune"	
2022	Go-Big Show	Himself/Judge		

== Awards and nominations ==
- American Music Awards
  - 2007, Favorite Male Artist (Nominated)
- BET Awards
  - 2009, Best Male R&B Artist (Nominated)
  - 2009, Best Collaboration ("Blame It") with Jamie Foxx (Won)
  - 2009, Viewer's Choice ("Can't Believe It") with Lil Wayne (Nominated)
  - 2008, Best Collaboration ("Kiss Kiss") with Chris Brown (Nominated)
  - 2008, Best Collaboration ("Low") with Flo Rida (Nominated)
  - 2008, Viewer's Choice ("Kiss Kiss") with Chris Brown (Nominated)
  - 2008, Best Collaboration ("Good Life") with Kanye West (Won)
  - 2008, Video of the Year ("Good Life") with Kanye West (Nominated)
- BET Hip Hop Awards
  - 2009. Producer of the Year (Nominated)
  - 2008, Best Ringtone ("Low") with Flo Rida (Nominated)
  - 2008, Best Hip-Hop Video ("Good Life") with Kanye West (Won)
  - 2008, Best Hip-Hop Collabo ("Low") with Flo Rida (Nominated)
  - 2008, Best Hip-Hop Collabo ("Good Life") with Kanye West (Nominated)
  - 2008, Track of the Year ("Good Life") with Kanye West (Nominated)
- BMI Urban Awards
  - Song Writer Of The Year (Won)
  - Producer Of The Year shared with J. R. Rotem & Kanye West (Won)
- Grammy Awards

Year	Nominee / work	Award	Result
2008	"Bartender" (featuring Akon)	Best R&B Performance by a Duo or Group with Vocals	Nominated
2008	"Good Life" (with Kanye West)	Best Rap Song	Won
2008	"Good Life" (with Kanye West)	Best Rap/Sung Collaboration	Nominated
2008	"Kiss Kiss" (with Chris Brown)	Best Rap/Sung Collaboration	Nominated
2009	"Got Money" (with Lil Wayne)	Best Rap/Sung Collaboration	Nominated
2009	"Low" (with Flo Rida)	Best Rap/Sung Collaboration	Nominated
2009	"Low" (with Flo Rida)	Best Rap Song	Nominated
2009	Tha Carter III (as featured artist & producer)	Album of the Year	Nominated
2010	"I'm on a Boat" (with The Lonely Island)	Best Rap/Sung Collaboration	Nominated
2010	"Blame It" (with Jamie Foxx)	Best R&B Performance by a Duo or Group with Vocals	Won
2010	"Blame It" (with Jamie Foxx)	Best R&B Song	Nominated
2010	Three Ringz	Best Contemporary R&B Album	Nominated

- Nickelodeon Kids' Choice Awards
  - 2009, Favorite Male Singer (Nominated)
- Ozone Music Awards
  - 2008, TJ's DJ's Hustler of the Year (Nominated)
  - 2008, Club Banger of the Year ("I'm So Hood") with DJ Khaled, Trick Daddy, Rick Ross, & Plies (Nominated)
  - 2008, Club Banger of the Year ("Low") with Flo Rida (Nominated)
  - 2008, Best Rap/R&B Collaboration ("She Got It") with 2 Pistols & Tay Dizm (Nominated)
  - 2008, Best R&B Artist (Nominated)
  - 2008, Best TJ's DJ's Tastemaker Award (Won)
  - 2007, Best Male R&B Artist (Won)
  - 2007, Best Rap/R&B Collaboration ("Shawty") with Plies (Won)
  - 2007: Best Rap/R&B Collaboration ("Buy U a Drank (Shawty Snappin')") with Yung Joc (Nominated)
  - 2006, Best Rap/R&B Collaboration ("I'm N Luv (Wit a Stripper) (Remix)" with Twista, Pimp C, Paul Wall, R. Kelly, MJG, and Too Short) (Won)
- MTV Video Music Awards
  - 2008, Best Hip-Hop Video ("Low") with Flo Rida (Nominated)
  - 2008, Best Male Video ("Low") with Flo Rida (Nominated)
  - 2007, Monster Single of the Year ("Buy U a Drank (Shawty Snappin)"), featuring Yung Joc (Nominated)
- People's Choice Awards
  - 2008, Favorite Hip-Hop Song, "Low" with Flo Rida [Won]
  - 2008, Favorite Hip-Hop Song, "Good Life" with Kanye West [Nominated]
- Teen Choice Awards
  - 2008, Choice Hook-Up: Flo Rida Featuring T-Pain, "Low" (Nominated)
  - 2008, Choice Music: R&B Artist – T-Pain (Nominated)
  - 2008, Choice Music: Rap/Hip-Hop Track – Lil Mama featuring Chris Brown and T-Pain, "Shawty Get Loose" (Won)
- Vibe Awards
  - 2007, Best R&B Artist (Nominated)
  - 2007, Best Collaboration ("Buy U a Drank (Shawty Snappin)") with Yung Joc (Nominated)
  - 2007, Song of the Year ("Buy U a Drank (Shawty Snappin)") with Yung Joc (Won)
- Brit Asia TV Music Awards
  - 2014, Best Music Video ("Daddy Da Cash" by RDB feat. T-Pain) (Won)
- The Streamer Awards
  - 2021, Best Music Streamer (Nominated)
  - 2022, Best Music Streamer (Won)
