= Nyla =

Jamaican singer

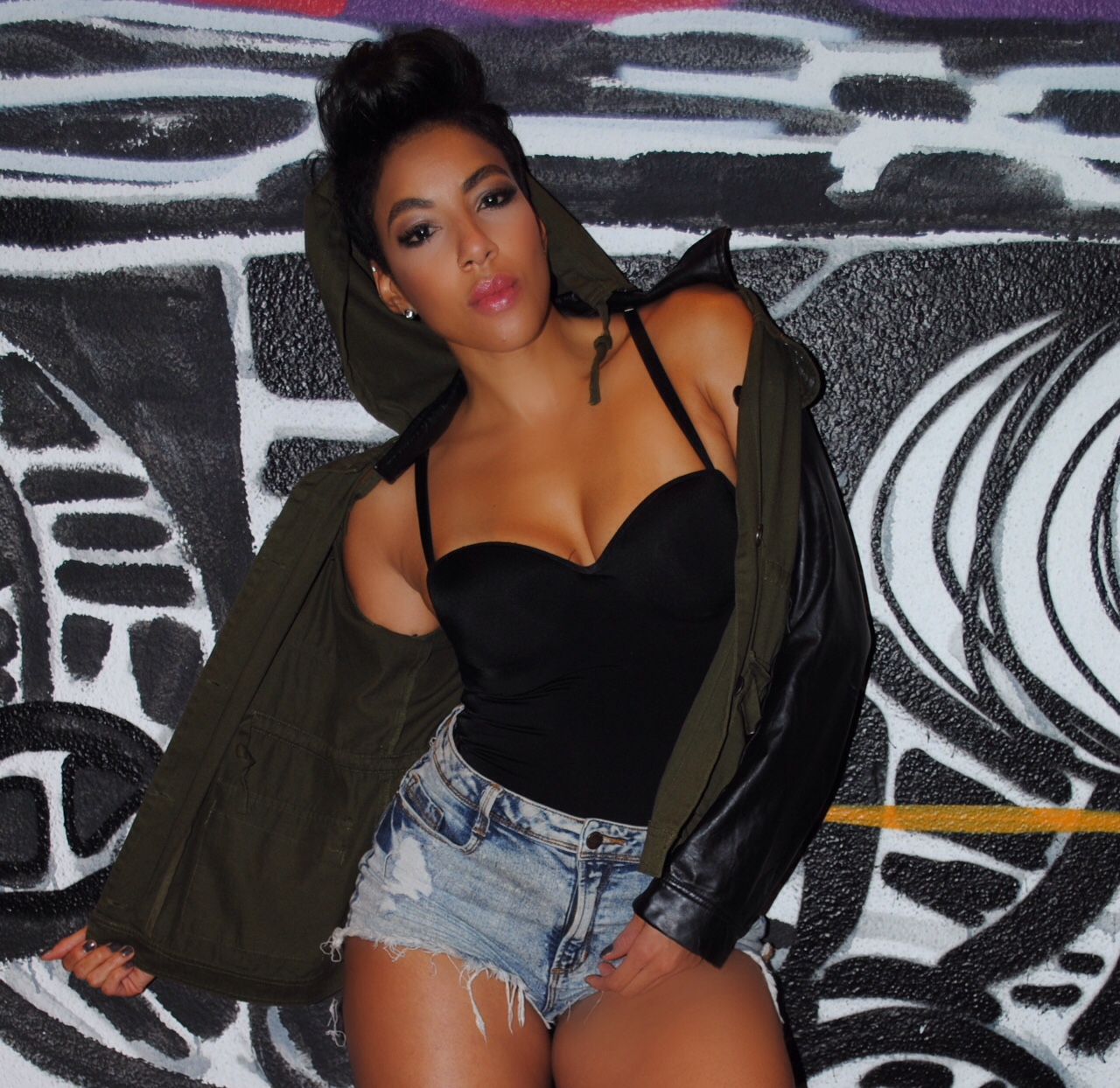

Background information
- Born: Nailah Thorbourne; 27 November 1983 (age 42); Kingston, Jamaica
- Genres: Reggae; dancehall; pop; EDM; reggae fusion
- Occupations: Singer; songwriter; rapper
- Years active: 2004–present
- Member of: Brick & Lace

Nailah Thorbourne (born 27 November 1983), better known by her stage name Nyla, is a Jamaican singer from Kingston. Nyla was a member of the R&B and reggae duo Brick & Lace whose debut album, Love Is Wicked, was released by Geffen and KonLive in 2007 and featured the chart topping single "Love Is Wicked". She is best known for being featured on Major Lazer's "Light It Up". Today she writes and performs as a solo artist and is currently recording and releasing music with some of the biggest chart topping artists and producers.

== Early life ==
Nyla Thorbourne was born to a Jamaican father and an African American mother in Kingston, Jamaica. She has 3 sisters, Tasha, Nyanda and Candace Thorbourne. Nyla went to Campion College High School during which time her group Brick & Lace was formed. After graduating high school Nyla studied marketing at Miami Dade College.

== Career ==
=== 2006–2012: Brick & Lace and Bloodline ===
Nyla's career in music began as a member of the pop / reggae group Brick & Lace. In 2006 the group signed a record deal with Akon's Konvict Muzik / Geffen Records and released their debut album, Love Is Wicked in 2007. The album spawned four charting singles... "Never Never", "Get That Clear", "Bad to di Bone" and their biggest hit to date, "Love Is Wicked", which was listed for 97 weeks in 7 different charts worldwide. In 2010, Nyla and her sisters formed a songwriting team called: Bloodline. They have written songs for Kelly Rowland, Christina Aguilera, Nicole Scherzinger, Leah Labelle and Arash. In 2012, she co-wrote the gold-certified, chart topping single "Follow the Leader", performed by Wisin & Yandel featuring Jennifer Lopez. "Follow the Leader" made strides all over the Latin charts and was one of the major releases in the Latin market the year it released.

=== 2014–present: Solo debut ===
In 2015, Nyla was featured on the song "Light It Up" by Major Lazer, a track from their album Peace Is the Mission. Later, a remix of the song featuring Fuse ODG was released as a single, which received highly positive reviews and charted top 10 and reached the #1 spot in many countries throughout Europe. The song also topped many digital formats (i.e. Spotify, Pandora and Shazam). In 2016 Nyla also featured on the song "Good Vibe" alongside Warner Bros Recording artist Strobe. The record was well received with over 1 million streams to date on Spotify. In 2017 Nyla picked up right where she left off with the release of the Ed Sheeran "Shape Of You" (Major Lazer Remix) feat. Nyla & Kranium.

== Discography ==
=== Singles ===
==== As lead artist ====
- 2013: "Stand Up"
- 2014: "Body Calling"
- 2019: "Faith"
- 2019: "We Can Believe In" (with Paul Secondi & Monarques)
- 2020: "Mad Out" (with Mr. Vegas and Topo La Maskara)
- 2020: "Fuego" (with Topo La Maskara)
- 2020: "Bam Bam" (with Freezy & Topo La Maskara)
- 2020: "Shake It" (with Topo La Maskara and Deewunn)
- 2020: "Hard & Done" (with Jugglerz and Charly Black)
- 2020: "One Love" (with Maor Levi)
- 2023: "Death of Us" (with KONO)

==== As featured artist ====
| Title | Year | Peak chart positions | | | | | | | | | | Certifications | Album |
| Title | Year | US | US Dance | CAN | AUS | AUT | BEL (FL) | FRA | NLD | SWI | UK | Certifications | Album |
|---|---|---|---|---|---|---|---|---|---|---|---|---|---|
| "Pornstar" (Sean Paul featuring Nyla) | 2013 | — | — | — | — | — | — | — | — | — | — | | Full Frequency |
| "I Want You (Remix)" (Tafari featuring Nyla) | 2014 | — | — | — | — | — | — | — | — | — | — | | Non-album single |
| "Touch Me There" (Redsan featuring Nyla) | 2014 | — | — | — | — | — | — | — | — | — | — | | The Baddest |
| "Light It Up" (Major Lazer featuring Nyla) | 2015 | — | — | — | — | 9 | — | — | — | — | — | BPI: 3× Platinum | Peace Is the Mission |
| "Light It Up (Remix)" (Major Lazer featuring Nyla and Fuse ODG) | 2015 | 73 | 7 | 32 | 54 | — | 4 | 14 | 2 | 7 | 7 | RIAA: 2× Platinum; ARIA: Gold | Peace Is the Mission |
| "Too Cool (Right Here)" (Sneakbo featuring Nyla) | 2016 | — | — | — | — | — | — | — | — | — | — | | Non-album single |
| "Good Vibe" (Strobe featuring Nyla) | 2016 | — | — | — | — | — | — | — | — | — | — | | Non-album single |
| "Shape Of You (Major Lazer Remix)" (Ed Sheeran featuring Nyla & Kranium) | 2017 | — | — | — | — | — | — | — | — | — | — | | Non-album single |
| "Young Hearts" (Henry Fong featuring Nyla & Stylo G) | 2017 | — | — | — | — | — | — | — | — | — | — | | Non-album single |
| "Skirt Hem" (KickRaux featuring Beenie Man, Tommy Lee Sparta & Nyla) | 2019 | - | - | - | - | - | - | - | - | - | - | | Non-album single |
