= Nyanda =

Jamaican and American singer-songwriter

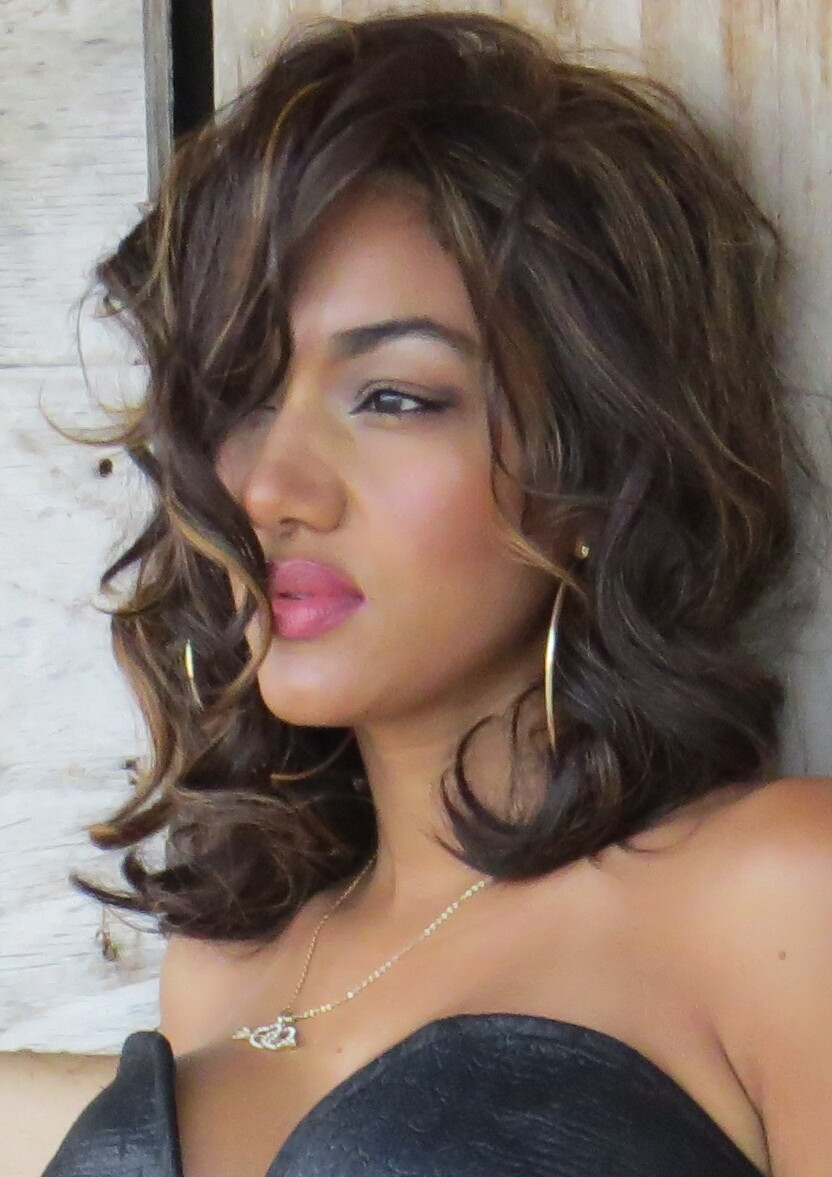
- Nyanda, in 2014

Background information
- Born: Nyanda Janelle Thorbourne; April 15, 1978 (age 48); Kingston, Jamaica
- Genres: Reggae, dancehall, reggae fusion
- Occupations: Singer; songwriter; rapper
- Years active: 2004–present
- Labels: Cat Music, Tropic Electric, BlackLion Music, Pink Scorpion
- Website: www.officialnyanda.com

Nyanda Janelle Thorbourne (born April 15, 1978), better known by her stage name/mononym Nyanda, is a Jamaican and American singer and songwriter from Kingston, Jamaica. Nyanda is a member of the R&B/reggae duo Brick & Lace whose debut album, Love Is Wicked, was released through Geffen / Kon Live in 2007 and featured the chart-topping single "Love Is Wicked".

In February 2013, Nyanda released her first promotional single, "Trouble", after announcing that she would be pursuing a solo career in music. Her first official single, "Slippery When Wet", was released in September 2013.

== Early life ==
Nyanda Thorbourne was born to an African-American mother and a Jamaican father in Kingston, Jamaica. She has 3 sisters, Tasha, Nailah and Candace Thorbourne. Nyanda went to Campion College High School during which time her group Brick & Lace was formed. After graduating High School Nyanda studied Marketing at Miami Dade College and then Advertising & Theater at the University of Miami. The name "Nyanda" is a Swahili word which means "plains".

== Career ==
=== Brick and Lace (2006–2012) ===
Nyanda's career in music started as a member of the pop/reggae group Brick & Lace. In 2006 Akon signed the group to Konvict Muzik / Geffen Records and released their debut album, Love Is Wicked in 2007. The album spawned four charting singles – "Never Never", "Get That Clear", "Bad to di Bone" and their biggest hit, "Love Is Wicked", which was listed for 97 weeks in 7 different charts.

=== Solo career (2013–present) ===
February 2013 marked the launch of Nyanda's career as a solo artist with the release of her promotional single, "Trouble". Produced by Black Lion, "Trouble" is a remix of Taylor Swift's multi-platinum single "I Knew You Were Trouble" which fuses reggae, dancehall and pop music. "Trouble" entered UK Music Week's Top 30 Urban Club Charts in Week 7 (2013) and remained in the charts for 7 Weeks, peaking at No. 15.

Nyanda's first official single, "Slippery When Wet", was initially released as a free download through SoundCloud on March 8, 2013. "Slippery When Wet" entered UK Music Week's Urban Club Charts in Week 27 (2013) and remained in the Top 30 for 5 weeks, peaking at No. 13. It was licensed and officially released later in the year by Cloud 9 (Benelux), Magic Records (Poland & Bulgaria) and Tropic Electric / InGrooves (Rest of the World). "Slippery When Wet" Won the Award for Best Reggae Song at the 2014 Lipstick Radio's Indie Music Awards.

In August 2013, Nyanda released the electro fueled house track, "Cool & Deadly" with South African DJs Euphonik and Fresh. "Cool & Deadly" was considered a South African Summer Anthem in 2013 as it climbed to No. 28 on South Africa Airplay Charts and reached No. 1 on 5FM's Top 40. The music video for "Cool & Deadly" was done documentary style, with all footage being taken from Split Seconds, a 5-part TV series on Channel O showcasing the fast-paced look at Fresh and Euphonik in Miami during 2013's Winter Music Conference.

=== Bloodline ===
In 2010, Nyanda and her sisters formed the songwriting team Bloodline. They have written songs for Kelly Rowland, Christina Aguilera, Nicole Scherzinger, Leah LaBelle and Arash. In 2012, she co-wrote the gold-certified, chart topping single "Follow the Leader" by Wisin & Yandel featuring Jennifer Lopez.

== Philanthropy ==
=== Reach a Hand Uganda (RAHU) ===
In February 2014, Nyanda was appointed Goodwill Ambassador for Reach a Hand Uganda.

== Discography ==
=== Singles ===
==== As lead artist ====
Year	Single	Album
2017	"Rodeo Wine"	Non-album singles
2017	"Young & Alive" (with DJ LBR)	Non-album singles
2016	"Keep Me Up All Night" (with Ripstar)	Non-album singles
2015	"The Way U Love"	Non-album singles
2015	"All My Love"	Non-album singles
2015	"Put It on Me"	Non-album singles
2014	"I Love Sax" (with Black Lion)	I Love Sax EP
2013	"Slippery When Wet"	Slippery When Wet EP
2013	"Cool & Deadly" (with Fresh and Euphonik as F.eU)	Cool & Deadly EP
2013	"Trouble"	Promotional single

==== As featured artist ====
Year	Title	Peak chart positions		Album
Year	Title	BEL	SPA	Album
2013	"Your Ways" (Nyanda & GNL, Ray Signature, Irene Ntale, Big Tril, Maurice Hasa)	—	—	—N/a
2013	"You Got Me Good (Tu Es Ma Go)" (Muss feat. Nyanda)	—	—	—N/a
2013	"Je Dis Oui" (Barbara Kanam feat. Nyanda)	—	—	—N/a
2013	"Boom & Rave" (Black Lion feat. Mr. Vegas & Nyanda)	—	—	Boom & Rave – EP
2013	"Like a Pro" (The Wizard feat. Nyanda & Chedda)	—	—	Like a Pro – EP
2014	"Blazin" (ChildsPlay feat. the Kemist & Nyanda)	—	—	—N/a
2014	"Mash It Up" (Black Lion & the Wizard feat. Kat Dahlia, Nyanda & the Kemist)	—	—	Black Lion Reggae Invasion Vol. 1
2014	"Run Away" (Ian Thomas featuring Nyanda)	25	28	Gametime
2015	"Kikute" (Leila Kayondo feat. Nyanda)	—	—	—N/a
2015	"Outta Control" (Admiral C4C feat. Nyanda)	—	—	—N/a
2016	"Dancing Kizomba (The Kemist Remix)" (Alx Veliz feat. Nyanda)	—	—	Single only
2016	"Touch Me" (Jessy Matador feat. Nyanda)	—	—	Non-album single
2016	"No Apologies (The Kemist Remix)" (JoJo feat. Wiz Khalifa & Nyanda)	—	—	Single only
2018	"Wokie Wokie" (Mr. P feat. Nyanda)	–	–	Non-album single
2019	"Like Ya" (Jul feat. Nyanda)			Rien100rien réédition

=== Non-singles ===
==== As lead artist ====
Year	Song	Album
2015	"Cinnamon Roll" (feat. Dionne Renée)	Black Lion Reggae Invasion Vol. 1
2015	"One More Time" (with The Kemist)	Black Lion Reggae Invasion Vol. 1
2015	"Footprints" (feat. Assassin)	Black Lion Reggae Invasion Vol. 1
2014	"I Won't Take You Back"	Xleration Riddim – Single

==== As featured artist ====
Year	Song	Artist	Album	
2015	"Mine Tonight"	Burna Boy (feat. Nyanda)	On A Spaceship	
2015		"Dangerous"	Pachanga (feat. Nyanda)	La Era Positivo
2014	"Superman"	Arash (feat. Nyanda)	Superman	
2014		Arash (feat. Nyanda)	Superman	"Ma Bala"
2018	"Wokie Wokie"	Mr P (feat. Nyanda)		Wokie Wokie Single

=== Songwriting credits ===
Year	Song	Artist	Album
2013	"Club Saved My Life"	Wally Lopez featuring Brick & Lace and J Balvin	Follow Me!
2013	"Shot Gun"	Brian Cross featuring Leah LaBelle	Pop Star – The Album
2012	"Follow the Leader"	Wisin & Yandel featuring Jennifer Lopez	Líderes
2012	"Around the World"	Christina Aguilera	Lotus
2012	"Grenade"	Vincenzo featuring Brick & Lace	La Matrice
2011	"Say Yes"	Nicole Scherzinger	Killer Love
2011	"This Time" (Sidney Samson Remix)	Kizzo featuring Bloodline	—N/a
2009	"Jai Ho! (You Are My Destiny)"	A. R. Rahman and The Pussycat Dolls featuring Nicole Scherzinger	Doll Domination
2009	"Swat"	Brick & Lace	Birch – Military Riddim
2007	"Get That Clear (Hold Up)"	Brick & Lace	Love Is Wicked
2007	"Never Never"	Brick & Lace	Love Is Wicked
2007	"Don't Stop"	Brick & Lace	Love Is Wicked
2007	"Take Me Back"	Brick & Lace	Love Is Wicked
2007	"Why'd You Lie"	Brick & Lace	Love Is Wicked
2007	"Love is Wicked"	Brick & Lace	Love Is Wicked
2007	"Boyfriend"	Brick & Lace	Love Is Wicked
2007	"Push It Up"	Brick & Lace	Love Is Wicked
2007	"Buss A Shot"	Brick & Lace	Love Is Wicked
2007	"Mr. Officer"	Brick & Lace	Love Is Wicked
2007	"My Apple"	Brick & Lace	Love Is Wicked
2007	"U and Me"	Brick & Lace	Love Is Wicked
2006	"Move Tonight"	Brick & Lace	Detrimental Riddim
2006	"Nice 2 Meet U"	Frank n Dank featuring Brick & Lace	Nice 2 Meet U ('06 Version) 12"
2005	"Tonight"	Brick & Lace	Bionic Ras Riddim
2005	"Make Me Wanna Get Naughty"	Brick & Lace	Blink Riddim

== Music videos ==
Year	Video	Director
2015	"All My Love"	Alex Ceausu
2015	"Put It On Me"	Alex Ceausu
2014	"Run Away"	Peter Muls / Debbie Rowe
2014	"Trouble"	Eric Christian King
2014	"I Love Sax"	Damian Fyffe
2014	"Mash It Up"	The Governor
2014	"You Got Me Good"	Muss
2014	"Your Ways"	Dayo Atarodo
2013	"Slippery When Wet"	Muss
2013	"Like A Pro"	Igreco
2013	"Cool & Deadly"	—
