= D-Teck =

Dwayne "D-Teck" Grant
- Also known as: D-Teck
- Born: Dwayne Domonick Grant; November 4, 1987 (age 38); Kingston, Jamaica
- Origin: Bronx, New York, United States
- Genres: Hip hop, R&B, soul, Reggae
- Occupations: Record producer, record executive, rapper, songwriter, dj, television producer
- Years active: 2001–present
- Labels: Wazzup Media Group, Columbia, UMG, Bungalo Records, Konvict Muzik, The Orchard (company), Empire Distribution
- Website: about.me/DwayneGrant

Dwayne Domonick Grant (born November 4, 1987), known as D-Teck, is an American hip hop recording artist, record producer, songwriter, rapper, and label owner. He was born in Kingston, Jamaica and was raised in the Bronx, New York. He has worked with and produced the likes of Common Kings, Akon, Cara Braia, IamStylezMusic, Richie Loop, JQT, DJ Pain 1 and most recently was CEO of Wazzup Media Group.

== Musical career ==
=== 2001–2010: Early career ===
In 2001, D-TECK began writing, singing, and rapping in part by his love of hip-hop. In 2004, D-Teck was introduce to Christopher "Spida" Boswell, former member of the Refugee Camp and currently of Konvict Yard Muzik. Christopher "Spida" Boswell was the one who gave Dwayne the name "D-Teck". In 2010, Qwes Kross, elevated D-TECK as an official member of the 50/50 Konvict Muzik. D-Teck is online marketing director, A&R and recording artist.

=== 2010–2014: Konvict Muzik ===
In early 2012, D-teck was promoted as A&R Director for Konvict Muzik Group by the Co-CEO and Founder Melvin E. Brown. As A&R Director, D-Teck presented Common Kings to both Melvin E. Brown and co-founder of Konvict Muzik Group Megastar Akon. Common Kings were subsequently signed to Sony Music division in Australia. D-Teck was also instrumental in discovering K-pop Girls group JQT. As a result, JQT was also signed to Konvict Muzik. Currently, D-Teck is the Director of Artist & Repertoire, Talent Scouting, and Music Production.

=== 2015–present: Wazzup Media Group ===
In 2015, Dwayne "D-Teck" Grant created Wazzup Media Group, and is its CEO. D-Teck realized the need for a platform that covers entertainment in a broad sense without media bias; therefore, launching the conglomerate. D-Teck expertise and connections in the industry pivots as the engine behind Wazzup Media Group which expands radio, internet marketing, advertising, and a recording label. On November 7, 2016, Wazzup Media Group launched the company to the public with a gala that included performances by Ted Park, Muscle Team Fuzz, and perishable items for charity provided by celebrity chef, Shawnae Dixon.

== Discography ==
=== Music/production/mixtapes ===
- 2010: A-Wax feat. D-Teck – "If I'm Arrested"
- 2011: JDiamondz feat. D-TECK – "Murderer"
- 2012: D-Teck feat. Rassel – "Your Love"
- 2013: Akon feat. D-Teck – "One Time"
- 2013: Rashaun Will – I'm So Necessary (executive produced)
- 2012: D-Teck feat. Choclair and Koncreto – "We Run It Now"
- 2018: IamStylezMusic – "Who God Bless"
