= Errol Thompson =

Errol Thompson may refer to:

- Errol Thompson (audio engineer) (1948–2004), record producer and audio engineer
- Errol Thompson (ice hockey) (born 1950), retired ice hockey winger

== See also ==
- The Kemist, also known as Errol Thompson, Jamaican dj
