= Chixtape 5 =

Studio album by Tory Lanez
- Released: November 15, 2019
- Recorded: 2019
- Genres: R&B; hip-hop
- Length: 70:08
- Labels: Mad Love; Interscope
- Producers: Adam Mouttet; Alo905; Coop Chardonnay; Dr. Zeuz; Halfway; Kxhris; Troy Brown; Papi Yerr; Play Picasso; Rajah; Saox; Sergio Romero; Todd Pritchard; Tory Lanez

Tory Lanez chronology
| Love Me Now? (2018) | Chixtape 5 (2019) | The New Toronto 3 (2020) |

Singles from Chixtape 5
- 1. "Jerry Sprunger" Released: November 8, 2019

Chixtape 5 is the fourth studio album by Canadian singer and rapper Tory Lanez. It was released on November 15, 2019, through Mad Love and Interscope Records. This is the fifth instalment of the Chixtape series, which is inspired by and contains samples of "2000s-era R&B hits". The production on the album was mostly handled by Tory Lanez and Play Picasso. The album also includes guest appearances by Jagged Edge, T-Pain, Chris Brown, The-Dream, Mýa, Ashanti, Trey Songz, Lil Wayne, Fabolous and more.

Chixtape 5 was preceded by the single "Jerry Sprunger" featuring T-Pain. The album received generally positive reviews from music critics and was a commercial success. It debuted at number two on the US Billboard 200 and number one on the US Top R&B/Hip-Hop Albums charts, earning 83,000 album-equivalent units in its first week. In November 2021, the album was certified gold by the Recording Industry Association of America (RIAA).

== Background ==
Chixtape 5 is the first of the series in which it was released as an album on streaming platforms. The album cleared all of the samples and includes the original artist featured on the song. In an interview with Billboard, Tory Lanez said "Everything is 2000s-inspired. Everything is inspired by the times when things were golden for us. I think all those pieces and everything that we've come out with has been all about nostalgia. I'm about to take you on a whole journey musically."

The singer said that the album was heavily inspired by Chris Brown's album Indigo, inspiring him with its edited low-pitched background vocals, its samples from early 2000s R&B, and how double tracks from that album were managed.

== Promotion ==
On November 1, 2019, Tory Lanez announced the album's release date with Ashanti on the cover art. Tory Lanez launched a website named after the album with an interface designed after the social network website MySpace.

== Singles ==
On November 8, 2019, he released the lead single of the album, "Jerry Sprunger" featuring T-Pain, accompanied by a music video. The single debuted at number 83 on the US Billboard Hot 100 on the week of November 23, 2019. The following week, the single reached it peak at number 44 on the chart, following the album's release. The single also peaked at number 34 on the Canadian Hot 100 and number 32 on the UK Singles Chart respectively.

=== Other songs ===
After the album's release, "The Take" featuring Chris Brown debuted at number 66 on the Billboard Hot 100 chart. The song also peaked at number 68 on the Canadian Hot 100 chart. "Beauty in the Benz" featuring Snoop Dogg debuted at number 87 on the Billboard Hot 100 chart. The single also peaked at number 64 on the Canadian Hot 100 and number 70 on the UK Singles Chart respectively. In addition, "The Trade" featuring Jagged Edge and Jermaine Dupri managed to peaked at number one on the US Bubbling Under the Hot 100 chart.

== Critical reception ==
Professional ratings
Aggregate scores
| Source | Rating |
|---|---|
| Metacritic | 61/100 |
Review scores
| Source | Rating |
| HipHopDX | 3.4/5 |
| NME | 3/5 stars |
| Now | 2/5 |
| Pitchfork | 5.8/10 |
| RapReviews | 6.5/10 |

Chixtape 5 received generally positive reviews from music critics. At Metacritic, which assigns a normalized rating out of 100 to reviews from professional publications, the album received an average score of 61, based on five reviews.

== Commercial performance ==
Chixtape 5 debuted at number two on the US Billboard 200, earning 83,000 album-equivalent units, (including 9,000 copies as pure album sales) in its first week. This became Tory Lanez's fourth US top-ten debut on the chart. The album also accumulated a total of 94 million on-demand audio streams for the album's songs that week, becoming Tory's highest first week streaming figures to date. On November 15, 2021, the album was certified gold by the Recording Industry Association of America (RIAA) for combined sales and album-equivalent units of over 500,000 units in the United States.

== Track listing ==
Credits adapted from Tidal.

| No. | Title | Writer(s) | Producer(s) | Length |
|---|---|---|---|---|
| 1. | "Jalissa's Back! (Skit)" | Daystar Peterson; Brittany Taylor | Tory Lanez | 0:54 |
| 2. | "The Trade" (featuring Jagged Edge and Jermaine Dupri) | Peterson; Daniel Gonzalez; Aidan Crotinger; Brandon Casey; Brian Casey; Chauncey Hawkins; Kenneth Ifill; John Jackson; Ernesto Shaw; Jermaine Dupri; Usher Raymond; Manuel Seal | Tory Lanez; Play Picasso; Halfway | 4:34 |
| 3. | "Jerry Sprunger" (with T-Pain) | Peterson; Gonzalez; Faheem Najm; Anthony Woart, Jr. | Tory Lanez; Play Picasso; Papi Yerr | 3:53 |
| 4. | "Beauty in the Benz" (featuring Snoop Dogg) | Peterson; Gonzalez; Calvin Broadus; Chad Hugo; Pharrell Williams | Tory Lanez; Play Picasso | 3:57 |
| 5. | "Blowin' Mine's // Leah's Introduction (Skit)" | Peterson; Gonzalez; Broadus; Mark Adams; Steven Arrington; Hugo; Raymond Turner; Stephen Washington; Daniel Webster; Williams; Kyle Coleman; Hue Strother | Tory Lanez; Play Picasso; Kxhris | 3:29 |
| 6. | "The Take" (featuring Chris Brown) | Peterson; Christopher Brown; Gonzalez; Sergio Romero; Anthony Woart, Jr.; Manesh Lad; Aaron Lobban; Lamar Edwards; James Fauntleroy; Harvey Mason; Steven Russell; Damon Thomas | Tory Lanez; Play Picasso; Romero; Papi Yerr; Rajah; ALO905 | 3:41 |
| 7. | "Broken Promises" | Peterson; Gonzalez; Romero | Tory Lanez; Play Picasso; Romero | 2:26 |
| 8. | "The Fargo Splash" (featuring Ludacris) | Peterson; Christopher Bridges; Gonzalez; Laurence Mizell; Jesus Bobe; Alvaro Barranco; Carl Wheeler; Dwayne Wiggins | Tory Lanez; Play Picasso; Dr. Zeuz; Saox | 5:11 |
| 9. | "Luv Ya Gyal // Love Sounds" (featuring The-Dream) | Peterson; Gonzalez; Terius Nash; Christopher Stewart | Tory Lanez; Play Picasso; Papi Yerr | 6:44 |
| 10. | "Yessirr" | Peterson; Gonzalez; Todd Pritchard; Derrick Baker; Marcus Cooper; Stephen Garrett; Corey Mathis; James Scheffer; Diamond Smith; Joseph Smith; Spectacular Smith; Philip Payne | Tory Lanez; Play Picasso; Pritchard | 3:43 |
| 11. | "Best of You // Busted (Skit)" (featuring Mýa) | Gonzalez; Peterson; Romero; Mya Harrison; Teron Beal; Jimmy Cozier; Kasseem Dean; Mashonda Tifrere; Jason Phillips; Payne; Shawn Carter; Marcel Hall; Samuel Barnes; Larry Gates; Marlon Williams; Jean-Claude Olivier | Tory Lanez; Play Picasso; Romero | 3:51 |
| 12. | "The Cry" (featuring Mario) | Peterson; Gonzalez; Mario Barrett; Payne; Jasper Cameron; Jamal Jones; Elvis Williams | Tory Lanez; Play Picasso | 4:30 |
| 13. | "Still Waiting" (featuring Trey Songz) | Peterson; Gonzalez; Romero; Tremaine Neverson; Johntá Austin; Mikkel Eriksen; Tor Hermansen | Tory Lanez; Play Picasso; Romero | 4:15 |
| 14. | "A Fools Tale (Running Back)" (featuring Ashanti) | Peterson; Gonzalez; Ashanti Douglas; Seven Aurelius; Mark DeBarge; Etterlene Jordan; Irv Lorenzo; Payne | Tory Lanez; Play Picasso | 4:52 |
| 15. | "Thoughts" (featuring Lloyd and Lil Wayne) | Peterson; Gonzalez; Dwayne Carter; Lloyd Polite, Jr.; Coleman; Adam Mouttet; Bobe; Gary Kemp; Maurice Sinclair; Cameron | Tory Lanez; Play Picasso; Dr. Zeuz; Kxhris; Mouttet | 5:33 |
| 16. | "If You Gotta..." (featuring Fabolous) | Peterson; Gonzalez; Jackson; Cynthia Loving; Justin Smith | Tory Lanez; Play Picasso | 3:45 |
| 17. | "Room 112" (featuring Slim and Nyce) | Peterson; Gonzalez; Bernard Edwards; Garrett Hamler; Peter Ivers; John Parker; Quinnes Parker | Tory Lanez; Play Picasso | 3:35 |
| 18. | "Last Love Letter (Skit)" | Peterson; Gonzalez; Taylor | Tory Lanez; Play Picasso | 1:15 |
| Total length: | | | | 70:08 |

Notes

- "Jalissa's Back! (Skit)", "Blowin' Mine's // Leah's Introduction (Skit)", and "Last Love Letter (Skit)" features vocals by Brittany Taylor
- "The Trade" contains a sample of "Trade It All Pt. 2" by Fabolous, P Diddy, and Jagged Edge
- "Jerry Sprunger" contains a sample of "I'm Sprung" by T-Pain
- "Beauty in the Benz" contains a sample of "Beautiful" by Snoop Dogg
- "Blowin Mines" contains a sample of "Let's Get Blown" By Snoop Dogg and Pharrell Williams
- "The Take" contains a sample of "Take You Down" by Chris Brown
- "The Fargo Splash" contains a sample of "Splash Waterfalls" by Ludacris
- "Luv Ya Gyal" contains a sample of "I Luv Your Girl" by The-Dream Ft. Young Jeezy
- "Yessirr" contains a sample of "Your Body" by Pretty Ricky
- "Best of You" contains a sample of "Best of Me, Part 2" by Mya Ft. Jay-Z
- "The Cry" contains a sample of "Crying Out for Me" by Mario
- "Still Waiting" contains a sample of "Can't Help But Wait" by Trey Songz
- "A Fools Tale (Running Back)" contains a sample of "Foolish" by Ashanti

== Personnel ==
Credits adapted from Tidal.

Musicians

- Todd Pritchard – instrumental ensemble (tracks 2–4, 12–16)
- Daniel Gonzalez – instrumental ensemble (track 3)
- Larry Cooper Jr. – instrumental ensemble (tracks 4, 10, 14)
- Sebastian Rompotis – instrumental ensemble (tracks 10, 17)
- Benjamin Lasnier – instrumental ensemble (track 12)

Technical

- Johann Chavez – mixing (all tracks), engineering (track 2–17)
- Play Picasso – mixing (all tracks)
- Chris Gehringer – mastering (all tracks)
- Tory Lanez – engineering (tracks 1, 18)
- Michael Romero – engineering (track 2–18)
- T-Pain – engineering (track 3)
- Philip "DJ Hardwerk" Constable – engineering (track 10)
- Andrew Grossman – engineering (track 10

== Charts ==
=== Weekly charts ===
| Chart (2019) | Peak position |
|---|---|
| Australian Albums (ARIA) | 18 |
| Belgian Albums (Ultratop Flanders) | 64 |
| Belgian Albums (Ultratop Wallonia) | 131 |
| Canadian Albums (Billboard) | 2 |
| Dutch Albums (Album Top 100) | 15 |
| French Albums (SNEP) | 76 |
| Irish Albums (IRMA) | 81 |
| New Zealand Albums (RMNZ) | 25 |
| Swiss Albums (Schweizer Hitparade) | 65 |
| UK Albums (Official Charts) | 10 |
| US Billboard 200 | 2 |
| US Top R&B/Hip-Hop Albums (Billboard) | 1 |

=== Year-end charts ===
| Chart (2020) | Position |
|---|---|
| US Billboard 200 | 122 |
| US Top R&B/Hip-Hop Albums (Billboard) | 58 |

== Certifications ==
| Region | Certification | Certified units/sales |
|---|---|---|
| United Kingdom (BPI) | Silver | 60,000^{‡} |
| United States (RIAA) | Gold | 500,000^{‡} |
^{‡} Sales+streaming figures based on certification alone.
