= Bratz (film) =

2007 American teen comedy film by Sean McNamara

- Theatrical release poster
- Directed by: Sean McNamara
- Screenplay by: Susan Estelle Jansen
- Story by: David Eilenberg; Adam de la Peña
- Based on: Bratz by Carter Bryant
- Produced by: Avi Arad; Isaac Larian; Steven Paul
- Starring: Nathalia Ramos; Janel Parrish; Skyler Shaye; Logan Browning; Chelsea Staub; Lainie Kazan; Jon Voight
- Cinematography: Christian Sebaldt
- Edited by: Jeff W. Canavan
- Music by: John Coda
- Production companies: Crystal Sky Pictures; MGA Entertainment; Arad Productions Inc.
- Distributed by: Lionsgate
- Release date: August 3, 2007
- Running time: 102 minutes
- Country: United States
- Language: English
- Budget: $20 million
- Box office: $26 million

Bratz (also known as Bratz: The Movie) is a 2007 American teen comedy film based on the fashion dolls of the same name from MGA Entertainment. The film is directed by Sean McNamara with a screenplay by Susan Estelle Jansen, from a story written by Adam de la Peña and David Eilenberg. It is the first live-action film based on the doll line after numerous direct-to-video animated films and a television series.

It stars Nathalia Ramos, Skyler Shaye, Logan Browning and Janel Parrish as the members of the group, with Chelsea Staub, Lainie Kazan, and Jon Voight in supporting roles. The story revolves around a group of four teenage girls, the origin of their friendship, and the social pyramid that tries to make the Bratz conform to archetypal high school cliques. Principal photography took place in Los Angeles in February and March 2007.

Bratz was released in the United States on August 3, 2007, by Lionsgate. It received negative reviews and grossed $26 million worldwide.

== Plot ==
Yasmin, Cloe, Sasha and Jade are four teenage best friends and are about to start their freshman year of high school together in Los Angeles. There, Meredith Baxter Dimly, a rich, popular and extremely controlling student body president, wants everyone to belong to a clique, and goes about organizing students. However, Meredith dislikes the independent spirit of the four girls and immediately realizes they will pose a problem to her plans, plotting to ruin their friendship and make them conform to her prefabricated cliques.

Cloe is a soccer player and meets Cameron, on whom she instantly develops a crush, distancing herself from her friends. Sasha is recruited as a cheerleader and joins the cheerleading squad. Jade joins the science club, then meets Dexter and discovers a passion for fashion design. Yasmin joins the journalism club, but later decides to focus on singing before she meets Dylan, a popular yet laid-back jock, who is deaf but can lip read, who misses being able to listen to music. Though the girls try to make time for each other, they are all busy with their own respective interests and new friends. The friends begin to drift apart as they are compelled to stay within their cliques due to Meredith's plans.

Two years later, an accidental food fight causes them to get detention for breaking Principal Dimly's statue after Meredith sends her pet dog, Paris, to attack Cloe from flirting with Cameron. The girls realize that they miss being close friends and decide to recover that connection. They also try to get the other schoolmates to socialize outside their cliques. However, the girls find out they are not invited to Meredith's second "Super Sweet 16" birthday party, but they are forced to work for Meredith due to Cloe's mom having a job serving food. At the party, Meredith decides to expose Yasmin's secret (video footage of her dancing and singing with a face mask). When Dylan and Yasmin's brother Manny starts doing a conga line and everybody joins in, Meredith is humiliated. The party ends disastrously when Meredith accidentally gets smothered on her cake and thrown into the pool with her friends.

The next day at school, the girls decide to be part of the talent show to win a scholarship. Meredith is always the one who wins, yet the "Bratz" are prepared to take her down. Later, Meredith tries to blackmail the girls by using an embarrassing photo to have them quit the talent show. This results in her plans to backfire with everyone else's secrets being revealed publicly. This idea brings all the cliques together again, and the girls perform an elaborate musical number. Meredith constantly attempts to steal the spotlight. In the end, there is a tie. Meredith gets the trophy, but the girls win the talent show and they decide to give Cloe the scholarship. They are offered an appearance at a red carpet gala by an MTV vice president, while Meredith and her father Principal Dimly attempt to foil the girls' attempts but fail.

== Cast ==
- Logan Browning as Sasha, a Bratz member and a cheerleader
- Janel Parrish as Jade, a Bratz and science club member
- Nathalia Ramos as Yasmin, a Bratz member
- Skyler Shaye as Cloe, a Bratz member and a soccer player
- Chelsea Kane Staub as Meredith Baxter Dimly, a rich and popular girl
- Anneliese van der Pol as Avery, Meredith's friend
- Malese Jow as Quinn, Meredith's friend
- Ian Nelson as Dylan, a deaf student
- Stephen Lunsford as Cameron, a friend of Meredith
- Jon Voight as Principal Dimly, Meredith's father and the principal of Carry Nation High School
- Lainie Kazan as Bubbie, Yasmin's grandmother
- William May as Manny, Yasmin's younger brother
- Emily Everhard as Cherish, Meredith's younger sister
- Chet Hanks as Dexter, a science club member
- Carl Rux as Mr. Whitman, the high school choir and music teacher
- Kim Morgan Greene as Katie, Cloe's mother
- Kadeem Hardison as Sasha's father

Additionally, director Sean McNamara makes a cameo appearance as Tom McShavie, the Vice President of MTV Networks. Producer Avi Arad also makes an uncredited cameo appearance as one of the talent show judges. Jerad Anderson plays Jonas Johnson, a member of the football team, while Lee Reherman plays the Vice Principal Sludge. Daniel Booko appears as a jock, and Susie Singer Carter as Barbara.

== Production ==
The early development for Bratz was originally envisioned as an animated feature film, unlike the straight-to-video Bratz films, but it was ultimately decided that the film should be live-action instead. Paula Abdul was dropped from the production before completion while working on American Idol. She was originally enlisted to provide wardrobe designs, choreograph the film, executive-produce, as well as hold a role in the film. This was revealed on Hey Paula, her reality show on her personal life.

Susie Singer Carter also wrote and produced the film for Lionsgate but lost her credit in a Writers Guild arbitration; however, her name appears as screenwriter on the final movie poster.

The film was shot during February and March 2007 at Santee Education Complex in South Los Angeles, California, while school was in session.

== Reception ==
=== Critical response ===
On Rotten Tomatoes, Bratz received a 10% rating based on 79 reviews; the average rating is 3.4/10. The site's critical consensus reads, "Full of mixed messages and dubious role-models, Bratz is too shallow even for its intended audience." On Metacritic, the film has a score of 21 out of 100, based on 18 critics, indicating "generally unfavorable" reviews. Audiences polled by CinemaScore gave the film an average grade of "B+" on an A+ to F scale.

=== Box office ===
Bratz grossed $10 million in North America and $16 million in other territories for a total gross of $26 million.

== Home media ==
The film was released to DVD on November 27, 2007.

== Soundtrack ==
Bratz: Motion Picture Soundtrack

Soundtrack album by Various Artists
- Released: July 31, 2007
- Genres: Pop; pop rock; teen pop; hip hop; R&B
- Label: Geffen
- Producers: Chris Arvan; Alex Band; Reace Beatz; Cindy Cooper; Bryan Clark; Ron Fair; Matthew Gerrard; Ron Harris; Tal Herzberg; Abraham Laboriel; Mateo Laboriel; Steven "Lenky" Marsden; Anthony Mazza; Stefanie Ridel; Wayne Rodrigues; Nicky Scapa; Bradley Spalter

Bratz chronology
Bratz: Fashion Pixiez (2007)	Bratz: Motion Picture Soundtrack (2007)	Bratz: Girlz Really Rock (2008)

A film soundtrack entitled Bratz: Motion Picture Soundtrack was released on July 31, 2007, through Geffen Records. The soundtrack featured music from artists such as Ashlee Simpson, Dropping Daylight, and the Black Eyed Peas. Three singles were released prior to the album's release, "Rainy Day" by Janel Parrish, "Rockstar" by Prima J, and "Fearless" by Daechelle.

Sales for the soundtrack were good and the album remained on the Billboard 200 charts for three weeks, peaking during its second week at position 83. Common Sense Media gave the soundtrack three stars, writing that "With heavy-hitting help from the Black Eyed Peas, The Slumber Party Girls, Ashlee Simpson, Dropping Daylight, and Lifehouse, these young performers gamely negotiate some very ordinary-sounding, preachy material and make the songs sparkle anyway." The 9th track on the album, "Out from Under", was later covered by Britney Spears on her 6th studio album, Circus.

=== Track list ===
No.	Title	Performer	Length
1.	"Rockstar"	Prima J	3:25
2.	"Fearless"	Daechelle	3:39
3.	"Love Is Wicked"	Brick & Lace	3:42
4.	"Rainy Day"	Janel Parrish	3:17
5.	"Open Eyes"	Nathalia Ramos, Skyler Shaye, Janel Parrish, and Logan Browning	3:09
6.	"Heartburn"	NLT	3:21
7.	"It's All About Me"	Chelsea Staub	3:08
8.	"Now Or Never"	Orianthi	4:02
9.	"Out from Under"	Joanna	4:07
10.	"In Crowd"	Sean Stewart	2:31
11.	"Express Yourself"	Black Eyed Peas	3:33
12.	"My Life"	Slumber Party Girls	2:50
13.	"Go Go"	Jibbs	2:51
14.	"It Doesn't Get Better Than This"	Alex Band	2:51
15.	"Saying Goodbye"	Matt White	4:13
16.	"Invisible"	Ashlee Simpson	3:44
17.	"Alter Ego"	Clique Girlz	3:28
18.	"Tell Me"	Dropping Daylight	3:21
19.	"If This Is Goodbye"	Lifehouse	2:53
20.	"Fabulous"	Chelsea Staub	2:45
21.	"Bratitude"	Nathalia Ramos, Skyler Shaye, Janel Parrish, and Logan Browning	4:33

== Video game ==
Bratz 4 Real
- DS box art
- Developers: Barking Lizards Technologies (DS); AWE Games (Windows)
- Publisher: THQ
- Platforms: Nintendo DS; Windows
- Release: November 5, 2007
- Genre: Adventure
- Mode: Single player

A video game adaptation of the film entitled Bratz 4 Real was released to the Nintendo DS and Windows platforms on November 5, 2007. The game was published by THQ.

The game's plot mirrored that of the film and players are tasked with completing goals and errands in order to progress the story along. The DS version of the game also allowed users to design their own clothes patterns, care for a digital pet, and play various mini-games. The Windows version also utilized mini-games, but excluded the option for players to design clothing or raise a digital pet. In both games users could play as one of the four main characters and view clips from the film.

=== Reception ===
Pocket Gamer heavily criticized the game and stated that it felt that it was released too early and that "There are some nice ideas at play, in particular where it attempts to break down the social barriers that beset children in secondary education, but as a game it's far too vacuous to recommend." IGN shared similar sentiments, writing that "Bratz 4 Real does some work to recast the shallow, self-absorbed Bratz girls in a more redeeming light, using them and their friendship to tell a tale of unity and breaking down social barriers. But whereas that premise and the game's compelling customization options prove to be solid positive points for this package, Bratz 4 Real is still a game brought down by a variety of other oddities."

== Reboot ==
In June 2025, a reboot was announced to be in development, with Kim Kardashian in talks to play the film's antagonist.

== See also ==
- List of American films of 2007
