= Slippery When Wet (Nyanda song) =

Single by Nyanda
- Genre: Reggae
- Length: 20:00
- Label: Tropic Electric / Black Lion / Pink Scorpion
- Songwriter(s): Errol Thompson; Michael Thompson; Nyanda Thorbourne; Tasha Thorbourne; Greg Ducent; Nick Ayala
- Producer(s): Black Lion Music

"Slippery When Wet" is the first official single from Nyanda. It was first released on SoundCloud on March 8, 2013. The music video was released on June 25, 2013. "Slippery When Wet" entered the Music Week Top 30 Urban Club chart in Week 27 (2013) and remained in the top 30 for 5 weeks, peaking at No. 13.

== Music video ==
The music video for "Slippery When Wet" was directed and edited by Muss from Boss Playa.

== Track listing ==
Slippery When Wet – EP
No.	Title	Producer(s)	Length
1.	"Slippery When Wet" (radio edit)	Black Lion	3:07
2.	"Slippery When Wet" (extended mix)	Black Lion	5:08
3.	"Slippery When Wet" (Miami Tropics remix) (feat. The Wizard)	The Wizard	2:40
4.	"Slippery When Wet" (ChildsPlay remix)	ChildsPlay	3:07
5.	"Slippery When Wet" (instrumental)	Black Lion	2:55
6.	"Slippery When Wet" (acapella)	Black Lion	2:57
Total length:			20:00

== Charts ==
Music Week (UK)	Peak position
Top 30 Urban Club Chart	13

== Licenses ==
Compilation	Year	Record label
101 Dance Hits 2014	2014	Armada Music
Summer Dance 2014 MegaMix Top 100	2014	Cloud 9
Kids Top 100 2014	2014	Cloud 9
The Ultimate Dance Top 40 Year Mix 2013	2013	Cloud 9
De Leukste Kids Hits 2013	2013	Cloud 9
Dance Hits Best of 2013	2013	Cloud 9
Fresh Hits 2014	2013	Magic Records

== Awards ==
Award	Year	Presenter
Best Reggae Song	2014	LipStick Radio's Indie Music Awards
