= Cake (2006 TV series) =

American television series

- Intertitle
- Created by: Barbara Meyer; Maia Terzian
- Written by: Susie Singer Carter; Don Priess
- Directed by: Michael Dimich; Sean McNamara
- Starring: Christa B. Allen; Anna Maria Perez de Tagle; Keegan McFadden; Emily Everhard
- Country of origin: United States
- Original language: English
- No. of seasons: 1
- No. of episodes: 13

Production
- Executive producers: Andy Heyward; Michael Maliani; Sean McNamara; David Brookwell; Susie Singer Carter; Laura Keats; Don Priess
- Producers: Barbara Meyer; Maia Terzian
- Running time: 22 minutes
- Production companies: Brookwell McNamara Entertainment; KOL/AOL for Kids; DIC Entertainment

Original release
- Network: CBS
- Release: September 16 – December 9, 2006

Cake (or Cake TV) is a how-to television series that originally aired on the KOL's Secret Slumber Party and KEWLopolis lineup on CBS. It was created by Barbara Miller and Maia Terzian, and was produced by DIC Entertainment in association with Brookwell McNamara Entertainment. The series was broadcast from September 16 to December 9, 2006.

== Overview ==
The show revolves around a teenage girl named Cake, who is very much into fashion and arts and crafts. Cake wishes to follow in the footsteps of her Grandma Crystal, who used to design costumes for a famous rock star. In her spare time, Cake also enjoys Irish dance and playing the bagpipes. Her hair was tied in double buns, but in "Miracle on Ice: The Case of the Frozen Assets", she wore a updo hairstyle. She wears a pink T-shirt during Cake TV filming sessions.

Like Cake, her best friend Miracle Ross also has an eye for fashion and art, except she believes in spending money in order to get the perfect gift rather than making it. In "Miracle on Ice: The Case of the Frozen Assets", she wore a red T-shirt for the Cake TV filming session to match Cake's, but in episodes 2-9, she wore a lavender T-shirt, then a purple one in episodes 10-13.

Amy Carson is a small child who lives in their neighborhood and enjoys cracking jokes and pulling pranks. She wears a green T-shirt during Cake TV filming sessions.

Together they are the hosts of Cake TV, an arts-and-crafts show on public-access television that is taped in Cake's garage. Benjamin Turner, who has no intention of going on camera because of stage fright, is the show's cameraman and director. He wears a blue T-shirt when operating the camera during Cake TV filming sessions.

The garage where Cake TV is produced is filled with Grandma's endless supply of trinkets she used when designing costumes, such as beads, glitter, ribbon, and many other supplies. Cake always has items organized and ready to be grabbed at the studio.

=== Series taglines ===
- You Can't Buy Individuality, But You Can Make It!
- PARTYTIME
  - Permission Always Required, Take Your Time, Imagination Means Everything.
- It's a Piece of Cake!
- Like It? ... Love it!
- What time is it? It's Party Time!
- See you next time on "Cake TV"
- Hi everyone, and welcome/welcome back to the super cool, creative world/super cool, super creative world of "Cake TV".
- It's "Cake TV" where you can't buy individuality but you can make it. Starring the always glamorous, Miracle, and me, your loveable announcer, Amy. And now here's your host, the girl with the golden glue gun, the girl who always takes the cake, Cake!

== Cast ==
- Christa B. Allen as Cake
- Anna Maria Perez de Tagle as Miracle Ross
- Keegan McFadden as Benjamin Turner
- Emily Everhard as Amy Carson

== Production and broadcast ==
Cake was one of two live-action series slated for CBS's Saturday morning when DIC Entertainment took over supplying content to CBS from Nickelodeon in March 2006. The series was created by Barbara Miller and Maia Terzian.

Cake was taped at Raleigh Studios in Hollywood, Los Angeles. Cake ended its airings on CBS after three years, when the network began the Cookie Jar TV block in September 2009.

== Episodes ==
No.	Title	Original release date	Prod. code	K6–11 rating/share
1	"Miracle on Ice: The Case of the Frozen Assets"	September 16, 2006	101	N/A
2	"Flip-Flopped"	September 23, 2006	102	0.4/1
3	"Or-dis-ganized"	September 30, 2006	103	0.3/1
4	"Not Your Mama's Piggybank"	October 7, 2006	104	0.4/2
5	"You Tell Her"	October 14, 2006	105	0.2/1
6	"The Write Inspiration"	October 21, 2006	106	0.3/2
7	"Baby Blues"	October 28, 2006	107	0.2/1
8	"Makin' Up Is Hard to Do"	November 4, 2006	108	0.6/3
9	"A Cake Walk"	November 11, 2006	109	0.2/1
10	"Trump-It"	November 18, 2006	110	0.5/2
11	"Flopportunity"	November 25, 2006	111	0.5/2
12	"Snack Attack"	December 2, 2006	112	0.2/1
13	"Second Hand Woes"	December 9, 2006	113	0.4/2

=== "Amy Takeover" ===
After "Second Hand Woes" aired, there were plans to air a fourteenth episode titled "Amy Takeover". Originally planned for 2007, there are currently no plans for the episode to air.
