= Jerry Sprunger =

2019 single by Tory Lanez and T-Pain

Single by Tory Lanez and T-Pain

from the album Chixtape 5
- Released: November 8, 2019
- Genre: R&B; trap
- Length: 3:53
- Label: Mad Love; Interscope
- Songwriters: Daystar Peterson; Daniel Gonzalez; Faheem Najm; Anthony Woart, Jr.
- Producers: Play Picasso; Tory Lanez; Papí Yerr

Tory Lanez singles chronology
"2 Cups" (2019)	"Jerry Sprunger" (2019)	"Numb" (2020)

T-Pain singles chronology
"Girlfriend" (2019)	"Jerry Sprunger" (2019)	"Can You Hear Me?" (2020)

Music video
- "Jerry Sprunger" on YouTube

"Jerry Sprunger" is a song by Canadian singer and rapper Tory Lanez and American singer T-Pain. It was released on November 8, 2019 as the lead single from the former's fourth studio album, Chixtape 5. The song samples and heavily interpolates T-Pain's hit single "I'm Sprung" (2005), and its title is a reference to British-American television personality Jerry Springer.

== Background ==
Tory Lanez teased the song in early December 2018, when he posted a video of T-Pain's first reaction to the track on Twitter. It was released on November 8, 2019 as the single from his album Chixtape 5, which was released a week later.

== Music video ==
The official music video was released on November 8, 2019. It consists of a remake of T-Pain's music video for "I'm Sprung". In keeping with the theme, Lanez rocks throwback looks from the early 2000s including do-rags, bandanas, oversized T-shirts, and jerseys while hosting a barbecue on the front lawn of his house with bikini-clad guests.

== Charts ==
=== Weekly charts ===
Chart (2019)	Peak position
Australia (ARIA)	95
Canada Hot 100 (Billboard)	34
UK Singles (Official Charts)	32
US Billboard Hot 100	44
US Hot R&B/Hip-Hop Songs (Billboard)	20
US Rolling Stone Top 100	15

=== Year-end charts ===
Chart (2020)	Position
US Hot R&B/Hip-Hop Songs (Billboard)	84

== Certifications ==
Region	Certification	Certified units/sales
United Kingdom (BPI)	Silver	200,000^{‡}
United States (RIAA)	Platinum	1,000,000^{‡}
^{‡} Sales+streaming figures based on certification alone.
