= Shawnae Dixon =

American chef and author

- Born: Shawnae Marie Mosley McCombs; December 12, 1976 (age 49); Staten Island, New York
- Education: Audrey Cohen College; Human Services, New York, New York
- Occupation: Chef
- Spouse: Jason H. Dixon Sr (m. 2004)
- Children: 6
- Culinary career
- Cooking style: New Soul
- Current restaurants
- SayGrace (Catering), New York City, New York (2008-present)
- Website: saygracenyc.com

Shawnae Marie Dixon is an American professional chef, cookbook author, and owner of "SayGraceNYC". She was born Shawnae Marie Mosley McCombs in Staten Island, New York in 1976. Today Dixon is sought by celebrity clients worldwide to cater, host, and prepare her signature dishes for both private and public settings. Dixon speaks and appears as a celebrity chef for many syndicated radio and television programs in the U.S. Her first book, With this Plate I Thee Wed..., with a foreword by Lamont Renzo Bracy, is set to be released in 2017 by Amazon Publishing. In addition to touring and book signings, Dixon is a regular guest chef on numerous TV shows with an reoccurring role as guest chef on Jack Thriller Party and Bullshit show.

== Life and career ==
Born Shawnae Marie Mosley McCombs to her mother Gloria and father Donald Gregory McCombs in Staten Island, New York in 1976, Shawnae was the oldest of three siblings. She moved quite a bit as a child while her father served in the United States Navy. It was in New Jersey Burlington County and Mt. Holly communities where she developed the fondness of the kitchen. Her father Donald ran a youth basketball league in Staten Island where she would go with him. She noticed that the one thing the basketball players and spectators wanted was a place to purchase food near the court. She began selling the perishable items she prepared to the players for money.

In 2004, she married Jason H Dixon Sr. and to explore a variety of the foods that would help bring fun, enjoyment and exploration to her family.

The shakeup in Dixon's life came in 2012, from Hurricane Sandy. Hurricane Sandy was the deadliest and most destructive hurricane of the 2012 Atlantic hurricane season causing nearly $75 billion in damage and claiming 233 lives. The storm passed over the Dixon family without physical harm; however, it left the family homeless for thirteen months. It was at this juncture that Dixon made a breakthrough by way of adversity. With a new-born child, it was suggested by her husband Jason, that she stay at home and take care of the children. Dixon began to sell plates out of the home much like she did at the basketball courts with her father. Dixon signature dishes, macaroni and cheese, chicken, and seafood soon became the talk of the town.

In 2014, she started a small catering business (SayGrace) that flourished into a profitable venture. The success from the SayGrace brand lead to Dixon being asked to debut her holiday savory cupcakes treats on Fox Network in the Philadelphia area. From the Fox Network, SayGrace has gone on to film with the Food Network, catering to the stars, and has become a recurring guest on New York City radio stations. She is a private chef and caterer to Power 105.1FM, Hot 97.1FM, WBLS, DTF Radio, Break N Chainz Radio 91.3FM Philadelphia, Jack Thriller’s Internet LIVE Podcast, Wazzup Media Group, Charlamagne tha God, TT Torrez, Angie Martinez, DJ Self, DJ Clue, Maino, and others. Dixon provides free clinics to prepare wholesome foods to serve to the community dedicated to the development of Staten Island. On February 28 of 2017, Shawnae Dixon was presented with a proclamation by 49th District of Staten Island, New York Councilwoman Debi Rose for her contributions in the community. In conjunction, a signed certificate of appreciation by Mayor Bill De Blasio was also given to Shawnae Dixon.

=== Education ===
Dixon attended Audrey Cohen College where she graduated in 2003 with a BA in Human Services. She continued and completed her Masters at Metropolitan College New York obtaining a Public Affairs and Administration in 2006. Dixon completed her second Masters at Long Island University Brooklyn with a certification in Special Education and Urban Studies in 2012.

=== Charity Work ===
In 2012, Dixon started "The Give Back Center" for urban communities to provide resources to obtain and sustain a richer and more prosperous life. In the past five years, the non-profit organization has grown from three members to nearly 100 nationwide. In 2013, Dixon (Say Grace) organized a charity bbq to aid families in New Brighton Community who were victims of fire. November 2016, Dixon was asked by Konvict Muzic A&R D-teck to facilitate a bake off at the Launch Party for his company Wazzup Media Group with the proceeds going to provide Christmas Gifts for underprivileged children in Upstate New York.

=== Tips and strategies ===
When appearing on cooking shows and in her cookbooks, Shawnae prepares meals that are designed for the common family. Shawnae created her catering business, SayGrace not just to cater to the celebrity crowd, but to teach people the importance of kitchen safety, and the pros of going organic. In addition, Dixon provides kitchen safety tips and advocates the importance of the proper use of knives and utensils. As stated in New York Lifestyle Magazine in 2013, Dixon adds the tip: Fire is the germ killer.

=== Television appearances ===
- Jack Thriller Presents (The Jack Thriller Show) (regularly appearing guest chef)
- The Today Show
- The Talk

== Bibliography ==
=== Cookbooks ===
- 30 Minute CookBook (2009)
- From My Heart with Love (2013)
- 'With this Plate I Thee Wed (2017)

== Awards and Organizations ==
=== Awards and nominations ===
- "The Golden Spoon", Midwest Digest (2015 and 2016)
- "Cooking w/ Style Award", GSA (2012)
