= Rappa Ternt Sanga =

Studio album by T-Pain
- Released: December 6, 2005
- Recorded: 2004–05
- Genres: R&B; hip-hop
- Length: 75:07
- Labels: Konvict; Jive; Zomba
- Producers: Akon (also exec.); Abou "Bu" Thiam (exec.); T-Pain; The Mad Violinist; Jai

T-Pain chronology
Rappa Ternt Sanga (2005)	Epiphany (2007)

Singles from Rappa Ternt Sanga
- 1. "I'm Sprung" Released: August 16, 2005; 2. "I'm 'n Luv (wit a Stripper)" Released: December 13, 2005

Rappa Ternt Sanga is the debut studio album by American singer T-Pain, it was released on December 6, 2005, by Akon's Konvict Muzik, Jive Records and Zomba Records. The title is an eye dialect of the phrase "rapper turned singer."

One of the leftover tracks from the album was, titled "You and Me"; which is the original version of "I Can't Wait" by Akon. The remix to "Studio Luv" was made featuring Lil Wayne. The remix to "Dance Floor" was made featuring Pitbull.

== Critical reception ==
Professional ratings
Review scores
Source	Rating
AllMusic	3.8/5 stars
RapReviews	6.5/10
Rolling Stone	3/5 stars

Andy Kellman of AllMusic stated that "Had there been limited use of studio tricks and more guidance, Rappa Ternt Sanga would've been a more-than-respectable debut. Christian Hoard of Rolling Stone said that "Rappa Ternt Sanga too often drifts into loverman tedium, but a handful of slower cuts are saved by T-Pain's R. Kelly-worthy gift for not holding back".

== Commercial performance ==
Rappa Ternt Sanga debuted at number 40 on the US Billboard 200 chart, selling 47,000 copies in the first week. In its second week, the album fell to number 94 on the chart. Over the following weeks the album eventually climbed to its peak at number 33 on the chart. On March 9, 2006, the album was certified gold for shipments of over 500,000 copies in the United States.

The album spawned two top 10 singles on the US Billboard Hot 100 with "I'm Sprung" and "I'm 'n Luv (Wit a Stripper)", which peaked at number eight and number five respectively.

== Track listing ==
Credits adapted from the album's liner notes.

No.	Title	Writer(s)	Producer(s)	Length
1.	"Rappa Ternt Sanga (Intro)"	Faheem Najm	T-Pain	1:48
2.	"I'm Sprung"	Najm	T-Pain	3:51
3.	"I'm 'n Luv (wit a Stripper)" (featuring Mike Jones)	Najm; Mike Jones	T-Pain	4:25
4.	"Studio Luv"	Najm; Mickey Wright, Jr.	T-Pain	3:37
5.	"U Got Me" (featuring Akon)	Aliaune Thiam	Aliaune "Akon" Thiam; Anthony Lawson	3:35
6.	"Let's Get It On"	Najm	T-Pain	3:52
7.	"Como Estas" (featuring Taino)	Najm	T-Pain	3:34
8.	"Have It (Interlude)"	Najm	T-Pain	3:16
9.	"Fly Away"	Najm; Yakubu Izuagbe	Yakubu "Jai" Izuagbe	3:55
10.	"Going Thru a Lot" (featuring Bone Crusher)	Najm; Wayne Hardnett	T-Pain	4:28
11.	"Say It"	Najm	T-Pain	4:00
12.	"Dance Floor" (featuring Tay Dizm)	Najm	T-Pain	5:09
13.	"Ur Not the Same" (featuring Akon)	Najm; Thiam	T-Pain	4:17
14.	"My Place"	Najm	T-Pain	3:40
15.	"Blow Ya Mind"	Najm	T-Pain	4:16
16.	"Ridge Road"	Najm	T-Pain	4:34
17.	"I'm Hi" (featuring Styles P)	Najm; Ashanti Floyd; David Styles	Ashanti "The Mad Violinist" Floyd	4:37
18.	"I'm Sprung 2" (featuring Trick Daddy and YoungBloodZ)	Najm; Maurice Young; Sean Paul Joseph; Jeffrey Grigsby	T-Pain	4:20
19.	"Real Good Muzik"	Najm	T-Pain	3:53
Total length:				75:07

Australian version
No.	Title	Writer(s)	Producer(s)	Length
20.	"I'm Sprung (UK Remix)" (featuring Dizzee Rascal)	Najm	T-Pain	4:44
21.	"I'm N Luv (Wit' a Stripper) 2 "Tha Remix" (featuring R. Kelly, Pimp C, Too $hort, MJG, Twista, and Paul Wall)	Najm	T-Pain	6:04

Additional remixes
No.	Title	Writer(s)	Producer(s)	Length
22.	"Dance Floor (Remix)" (featuring Pitbull)	Najm, Perez	T-Pain	3:38

== Charts ==
=== Weekly charts ===
Chart (2005–06)	Peak position
Japanese Albums (Oricon)	152
US Billboard 200	33
US Top R&B/Hip-Hop Albums (Billboard)	8

=== Year-end charts ===
Chart (2006)	Position
US Billboard 200	118
US Top R&B/Hip-Hop Albums (Billboard)	39

== Certifications ==
Region	Certification	Certified units/sales
New Zealand (RMNZ)	Gold	7,500^{‡}
United States (RIAA)	2× Platinum	2,000,000^{‡}
^{‡} Sales+streaming figures based on certification alone.
