= Konvict Kulture =

Record label

- Founded: 2003 as Konvict Muzik; 2022 as Konvict Kulture (rebrand)
- Founder: Akon; Melvin Brown; Bu Thiam
- Distributors: Vydia (2020–); Universal Motown Records (2005–2011); Universal Republic Records (2011–2014); Interscope Records (2006–2014); Def Jam Recordings (2008–2014); Sony Music (Jive/RCA) (2005/2017)
- Genre: Hip hop, R&B
- Country of origin: United States
- Official website: https://konvictkulture.com/

Konvict Kulture is a record label founded by singer Akon, Melvin Brown and Bu Thiam in 2003 under the name Konvict Muzik. Artists including T-Pain, Kat DeLuna, Mali Music, Red Café, Dolla, Ya Boy, and Costa Titch have signed to and released singles or albums by the label. Heard at the beginning of many of the label's recordings, besides Akon's own production or songwriting contribution, is the sound of the clank of a jail cell, followed by Akon uttering "Konvict". In 2022, the label was rebranded into Konvict Kulture. By 2011, Fotemah Mba was appointed Vice President of A&R for the label.

The label operated with another label founded by Akon in 2006, KonLive Distribution, whose flagship artist was Lady Gaga. KonLive was an imprint of Interscope Records, while Konvict Muzik was an imprint of Akon's label, Universal Motown Records, prior to the launching of KonLive. In 2011, Akon signed Nigerian artists P-Square, Tuface, and Wizkid as representatives of the label in Africa.

== Background ==
Akon started his own label after the success of his 2003 mixtape Akonvict.

Original Konvict Muzik Logo

== KonLive Distribution ==
KonLive Distribution
- Parent company: Interscope-Geffen-A&M
- Founded: 2006; 20 years ago
- Founder: Akon
- Defunct: 2013; 13 years ago
- Distributors: Interscope Records; Geffen Records
- Genre: Pop, dance, R&B, hip hop
- Country of origin: United States

KonLive Distribution (or simply KonLive) was a record label founded in 2006 as a joint venture with Jimmy Iovine's Interscope Records, the label was to allow both parties to manage the career and recording catalogue of singer Lady Gaga. Other notable acts signed to the label included Kardinal Offishall, Colby O'Donis, Brick & Lace, Mali Music, Natalia Kills, Jeffree Star, R. City, Ya Boy, and Verse Simmonds.

== Notable artists ==
=== Current ===
- Akon
- Jonn Hart

=== Former Konvict Artists ===
- OG Boo Dirty
- Demarco
- Sarkodie
- P-Square
- Verse Simmonds
- Wizkid
- Omega
- Sammie
- Cyhi the Prynce
- Costa Titch (deceased)
- D Teck
- Dolla (deceased)
- French Montana
- T-Pain
- Jeffree Star
- JQT
- Red Cafe

=== Former KonLive Artists ===
- Lady Gaga
- Kardinal Offishall
- Ya Boy
- R. City
- Brick & Lace
- Natalia Kills
- Jeffree Star
- Colby O'Donis
- Mali Music

== Discography ==
Artist	Album	Album details	Singles
T-Pain	Rappa Ternt Sanga	Released: December 5, 2005; Label: Konvict Muzik; Chart position: 33 U.S.; RIAA certification: Gold	I'm Sprung; I'm 'n Luv (wit a Stripper)
Akon	Konvicted	Released: November 14, 2006; Label: Konvict Muzik; Chart position: 2 U.S.; RIAA certification: 3× Platinum	Smack That; I Wanna Love You; Don't Matter; Mama Africa; Sorry, Blame It on Me
T-Pain	Epiphany	Released: June 5, 2007; Label: Konvict Muzik; Chart position: 1 U.S.; RIAA certification: Platinum	Buy U a Drank (Shawty Snappin'); Bartender; Church
Brick & Lace	Love Is Wicked	Released: September 4, 2007; Label: KonLive Distribution; Chart position: —; RIAA certification: —	Never Never; Love Is Wicked; Get That Clear (Hold Up); Take Me Back; Bad To Di Bone
Lady Gaga	The Fame	Released: August 19, 2008; Label: KonLive Distribution; Chart position: 2 U.S.; RIAA certification: 6× Platinum	Just Dance; Poker Face; Eh, Eh (Nothing Else I Can Say); LoveGame; Paparazzi
Kardinal Offishall	Not 4 Sale	Released: September 9, 2008; Label: KonLive Distribution; Chart position: 40 U.S.; RIAA certification: —	Dangerous; Set It Off; Burnt; Numba 1 (Tide Is High)
Colby O'Donis	Colby O	Released: September 16, 2008; Label: KonLive Distribution; Chart position: 41 U.S.; RIAA certification: —	What You Got; Don't Turn Back; Let You Go
Sway	The Signature LP	Released: October 6, 2008; Label: Konvict Muzik; Chart position: 51 U.K.; RIAA certification: —	F Ur X featuring $tush; Saturday Night Hustle; Silver & Gold
T-Pain	Thr33 Ringz	Released: November 11, 2008; Label: Konvict Muzik; Chart position: 4 U.S.; RIAA certification: Gold	Can't Believe It; Chopped N Skrewed; Freeze
Akon	Freedom	Released: December 2, 2008; Label: Konvict Muzik; Chart position: 7 U.S.; RIAA certification: 2× Platinum	Right Now (Na Na Na); I'm So Paid; Beautiful
Lady Gaga	The Fame Monster	Released: November 18, 2009; Label: KonLive Distribution; Chart position: 5 U.S.; RIAA certification: 5× Platinum	Bad Romance; Telephone; Alejandro; Dance in the Dark
Natalia Kills	Perfectionist	Released: March 15, 2011; Label: KonLive Distribution; Chart position: 134 U.S.; RIAA certification: —	Mirrors; Wonderland; Free; Kill My Boyfriend
Lady Gaga	Born This Way	Released: May 23, 2011; Label: KonLive Distribution; Chart position: 1 U.S.; RIAA certification: 4× Platinum	Born This Way; Judas; The Edge of Glory; You and I; Marry the Night
T-Pain	Revolver	Released: December 6, 2011; Label: Konvict Muzik; Chart position: 28 U.S.; RIAA certification: —	Best Love Song; 5 O'Clock; Turn All the Lights On
Jeffree Star	Mr. Diva - EP	Released: October 2, 2012; Label: KonLive Distribution; Chart position: —; RIAA certification: —	Mr. Diva; Legs Up
