= Light It Up (Major Lazer song) =

2015 single by Major Lazer

Single by Major Lazer featuring Nyla

from the album Peace Is the Mission
- Released: November 5, 2015
- Recorded: 2014 (Nyla's vocals); 2015 (remix)
- Studio: PYRMDZ (Miami)
- Genre: Moombahton; dancehall; EDM
- Length: 3:18 (album version); 2:46 (remix w/ Fuse ODG)
- Label: Mad Decent
- Songwriters: Thomas Pentz; Philip Meckseper; Nailah Thorbourne; T-Baby; David Malcolm; Sidney Swift; Nana Abiona
- Producers: Diplo; Jr Blender

Major Lazer singles chronology
"Lost" (2015)	"Light It Up" (2015)	"Who Am I" (2016)

Nyla singles chronology
"Body Calling" (2014)	"Light It Up" (2015)	"Too Cool" (2016)

Remix cover
- Cover of the remix featuring Nyla & Fuse ODG

Fuse ODG singles chronology
"Top of My Charts" (2015)	"Light It Up" (remix) (2015)	"Thank God" (2016)

Lyric video
- "Light It Up" on YouTube

Music videos
- "Light It Up" (remix) on YouTube; "Light It Up" (remix) - 3D version on YouTube

"Light It Up" is a song by American electronic music producing group Major Lazer, featuring vocals from Jamaican singer Nyla, which appears on Major Lazer's third studio album Peace Is the Mission. A remixed dancehall version of the song, to which additional vocals from British-Ghanaian Afrobeats artist Fuse ODG were added, was included on a re-released version of Peace Is the Mission and released as the album's third single overall on November 5, 2015.

They performed the song on 22 February 2017 at the closing ceremony of the Milan / Cortina Olympic Winter Games at the Verona Arena in Verona, Italy.

== Chart performance ==
The song attained international success in Europe and Oceania. It also marks Nyla's and ODG's highest-charting single to date. On the Billboard Hot 100 the song debuted at 98 and has peaked at number 73, marking Nyla's and ODG's first entry on the chart.

== Remixes ==
On March 12, 2016, an Italian version of the song was released, featuring vocals from Italian singer and songwriter Baby K.

== Music video ==
Method Studios design team created the film that opened the 2016 AICP Show, developing the concept of a character that embodied creativity; dancing avatars created with procedural art. Artists developed 50 texture effects and custom algorithms to execute them and a CG environment with lighting and camera setups and textures. The film was then re-cut to a new track, Major Lazer's “Light it Up” and posted online, where it garnered 100M+ views, drove downloads of the song and views for the artists, and went on to be recognized with awards, significant media coverage and re-posting worldwide.

== Charts ==
=== Weekly charts ===
Chart (2015–16)	Peak position
Australia (ARIA)	54
Austria (Ö3 Austria Top 40)	9
Belgium (Ultratop 50 Flanders)	4
Belgium Dance (Ultratop Flanders)	1
Belgium (Ultratop 50 Wallonia)	6
Belgium Dance (Ultratop Wallonia)	3
Canada Hot 100 (Billboard)	32
Czech Republic Airplay (ČNS IFPI)	6
Czech Republic Singles Digital (ČNS IFPI)	36
Denmark (Tracklisten)	10
Finland (Suomen virallinen lista)	6
France (SNEP)	12
France Airplay (SNEP)	1
Germany (GfK)	4
Hungary (Dance Top 40)	8
Hungary (Rádiós Top 40)	15
Hungary (Single Top 40)	16
Hungary (Stream Top 40)	3
Ireland (IRMA)	5
Italy (FIMI)	4
Netherlands (Dutch Top 40)	2
Netherlands (Single Top 100)	2
New Zealand (Recorded Music NZ)	16
Norway (VG-lista)	5
Poland Airplay (ZPAV)	3
Poland (Video Chart)	2
Romania (Media Forest)	8
Russia Airplay (Tophit)	7
Scottish Singles Sales (Official Charts)	10
Serbia (Radiomonitor)	3
Slovakia Airplay (ČNS IFPI)	11
Slovakia Singles Digital (ČNS IFPI)	5
Slovenia (SloTop50)	28
Spain (Promusicae)	14
Sweden (Sverigetopplistan)	3
Switzerland (Schweizer Hitparade)	7
UK Singles (Official Charts)	7
UK Dance (Official Charts)	2
UK Indie (Official Charts)	1
US Billboard Hot 100	73
US Pop Airplay (Billboard)	31
US Hot Dance/Electronic Songs (Billboard)	6
US Dance Airplay (Billboard)	1

=== Year-end charts ===
Chart (2016)	Position
Argentina (Monitor Latino)	77
Austria (Ö3 Austria Top 40)	32
Belgium (Ultratop Flanders)	17
Belgium (Ultratop Wallonia)	22
Canada (Canadian Hot 100)	60
Denmark (Tracklisten)	40
France (SNEP)	13
Germany (Official German Charts)	29
Hungary (Dance Top 40)	20
Hungary (Rádiós Top 40)	30
Hungary (Single Top 40)	68
Italy (FIMI)	13
Netherlands (Dutch Top 40)	8
Netherlands (Single Top 100)	3
New Zealand (Recorded Music NZ)	36
Poland (ZPAV)	39
Spain (PROMUSICAE)	14
Sweden (Sverigetopplistan)	13
Switzerland (Schweizer Hitparade)	18
UK Singles (Official Charts Company)	20
US Hot Dance/Electronic Songs (Billboard)	13
Chart (2017)	Position
Hungary (Rádiós Top 40)	85
Chart (2018)	Position
Hungary (Rádiós Top 40)	88

== Certifications ==
Certification for "Light It Up"
Region	Certification	Certified units/sales
Brazil (Pro-Música Brasil)	Platinum	60,000^{‡}
France (SNEP)	Diamond	333,333^{‡}
Germany (BVMI)	Platinum	400,000^{‡}
Italy (FIMI)	5× Platinum	250,000^{‡}
New Zealand (RMNZ)	4× Platinum	120,000^{‡}
United Kingdom (BPI)	3× Platinum	1,800,000^{‡}
^{‡} Sales+streaming figures based on certification alone.

Certification for "Light It Up" (Remix)
Region	Certification	Certified units/sales
Australia (ARIA)	Gold	35,000^{‡}
Austria (IFPI Austria)	Gold	15,000^{‡}
Belgium (BRMA)	2× Platinum	40,000^{‡}
Denmark (IFPI Danmark)	3× Platinum	270,000^{‡}
Poland (ZPAV)	Gold	25,000^{‡}
Portugal (AFP)	Platinum	20,000^{‡}
Spain (Promusicae)	3× Platinum	120,000^{‡}
United States (RIAA)	2× Platinum	2,000,000^{‡}
^{‡} Sales+streaming figures based on certification alone.

== Release history ==
Country	Date	Format	Label	Notes
Germany	November 5, 2015	Digital download	Mad Decent	Remix version
United Kingdom	November 6, 2015	Digital download	Mad Decent	Remix version
United States	November 6, 2015	Digital download	Mad Decent	Remix version
