= The Kemist =

American singer-songwriter

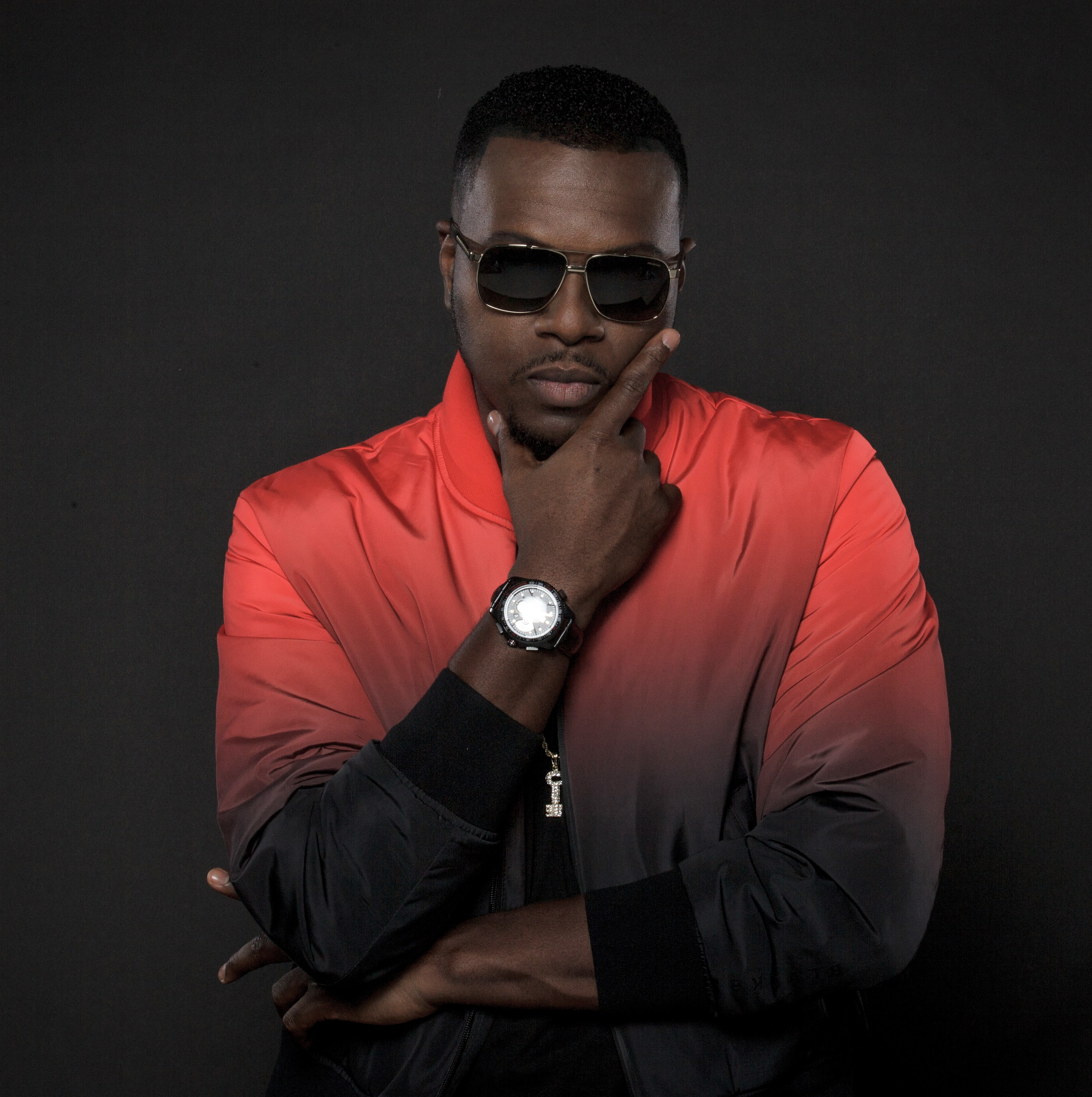

Background information
- Born: Errol Thompson
- Origin: Kingston, Jamaica
- Genres: Reggae, Dancehall, Trap, Hardstyle, Hip Hop, Dubstep, Moombahton
- Occupations: Deejay, producer, recording artist, songwriter
- Years active: 2012–present
- Labels: Universal Music, Republic Records
- Website: iamthekemist.com

The Kemist, is a Jamaican-American deejay, producer, recording artist and songwriter signed to Universal Music Group. His sound is a fusion of reggae and dancehall with electronic dance music.

== Early life ==
Errol "Kemar" Thompson, professionally known as The Kemist, was born and raised in Kingston, Jamaica. His mother, Marcia Griffiths, is considered the Queen of reggae music and his father, Errol Thompson Snr, is an acclaimed Jamaican broadcaster, social speaker and musician.

Kemar attended Wolmer's Boy's High School where he participated in rap battles during lunchtime and from there started making beats and selling tracks to friends.

In 2012, Kemar and Mike Thompson formed the production duo Black Lion, whose credits include Mash It Up, Slippery When Wet and I Love Sax.

== Career ==
The Kemist's first release as a vocalist was Assets, a collaboration with Yellow Claw and Tropkillaz that was released on Diplo's label, Mad Decent on 12 October 2013.

In 2018 The Kemist signed with Universal Music Group. On 2 November 2018 they released his first single Body Can't Lie featuring Nyanda via 21 Entertainment / Republic Records / Universal Music Canada.

== Discography ==
=== Albums & EPs ===
Year	Title	Tracklist	Label
2019	Mayhem	Mayhem 7.0 (feat Dj BrainDeaD & Nyanda)	21 Entertainment / Universal Music
2019	Mayhem	On You	21 Entertainment / Universal Music
2019	Mayhem	Body Can't Lie (feat Nyanda)	21 Entertainment / Universal Music
2019	Mayhem	Control You feat (Kalibandulu & Johnny Roxx)	21 Entertainment / Universal Music

=== Singles ===
==== As lead artist ====
Year	Title	Album	Label
2018	Body Can't Lie (feat Nyanda)	Body Can't Lie	21 Entertainment / Universal Music
2018	Big Dreamers (with Salento Guys and Paki & Jaro)	Big Dreamers	Total Freedom
2018	Rebels of a Nation (with LNY TNZ & Ruthless)	Rebels of a Nation	Spinnin' Records
2018	Mayhem (with Dj BrainDeaD feat Nyanda)	Mayhem	Tropic Electric
2017	Rumors (Dj BrainDeaD Remix) (feat Konshens & Alx Veliz)	Rumors (The Remixes)	Tropic Electric
2017	Rumors (Noise Cans Remix) (feat Konshens & Alx Veliz)	Rumors (The Remixes)	Tropic Electric
2017	Rumors (dEvolve Remix) (feat Konshens & Alx Veliz)	Rumors (The Remixes)	Tropic Electric
2017	Rumors (Pink Panda Remix) (feat Konshens & Alx Veliz)	Rumors (The Remixes)	Tropic Electric
2017	Rumors (English Version) (feat Konshens & Alx Veliz)	Rumors	Tropic Electric
2017	Rumors (Spanish Version) (feat Konshens, Goyo & Alx Veliz)	Rumors	Tropic Electric
2017	Drop it Like That (with KD Soundsystem)	Drop it Like That	Be Rich Records
2017	Drop It Like That (Perk Pietrek Remix) (with KD Soundsystem)	Drop it Like That	Be Rich Records
2017	Drop It Like That (Zeskullz & The Dual Personality Remix) (with KD Soundsystem)	Drop it Like That	Be Rich Records
2016	Incredible (with Dj BrainDeaD)	Incredible	Good Enuff
2016	Wild Like A Jungle (with KD Soundsystem feat Esco & Chedda)	Wild Like A Jungle	Tropic Electric
2014	Come For Free	Xleration Riddim – Single	Tropic Electric

==== As featured artist ====
Year	Title	Artist	Album	Label
2018	Boomshakalak	Mr. Black & Diego Miranda feat The Kemist	Boomshakalak - Single	Revealed Recordings
2017	Party General (Mightyfools Remix)	LNY TNZ & DJ Punish feat The Kemist	LNY TNZ* – Fvck Genres EP (Remixes)	Barong Family
2017	Haide (Greek Version) (Phoebus Remix)	Helena Paparizou feat. The Kemist	Haide (Greek Version) (Phoebus Remix) - Single	Universal Music
2016	Party General	LNY TNZ & DJ Punish feat The Kemist	LNY TNZ* – Fvck Genres EP	Barong Family
2016	We Don't Care (Dirtcaps Remix)	LNY TNZ feat The Kemist	We Don't Care (The Remixes) - EP	lnytnz.com
2016	We Don't Care (Riot Ten Remix)	LNY TNZ feat The Kemist	We Don't Care (The Remixes) - EP	lnytnz.com
2016	We Don't Care (Out of Cookies Remix)	LNY TNZ feat The Kemist	We Don't Care (The Remixes) - EP	lnytnz.com
2016	We Don't Care (Dirrty Berry Remix)	LNY TNZ feat The Kemist	We Don't Care (The Remixes) - EP	lnytnz.com
2016	We Don't Care	LNY TNZ feat The Kemist	We Don't Care - Single	lnytnz.com
2016	Fired Up (Radio Version)	LNY TNZ & Ruthless feat The Kemist	Fired Up (Remixes)	Barong Family
2016	Fired Up (Haterade Remix)	LNY TNZ & Ruthless feat The Kemist	Fired Up (Remixes)	Barong Family
2016	Fired Up (Kayzo Remix)	LNY TNZ & Ruthless feat The Kemist	Fired Up (Remixes)	Barong Family
2016	Fired Up (Skellism Remix)	LNY TNZ & Ruthless feat The Kemist	Fired Up (Remixes)	Barong Family
2016	Fired Up (Tropkillaz Remix)	LNY TNZ & Ruthless feat The Kemist	Fired Up (Remixes)	Barong Family
2016	Fired Up (Dirtcaps Remix)	LNY TNZ & Ruthless feat The Kemist	Fired Up (Remixes)	Barong Family
2016	Sexy Girls	DJ LBR feat The Kemist	Sexy Girls - Single	Space Party
2016	Sexy Girls	DJ LBR & Papa London feat The Kemist	Sexy Girls - Single	Music Media Consulting
2016	Bust it Up	Willy Joy feat The Kemist	Bust It Up - Single	Good Enuff / Mad Decent
2015	Pull It Up	Wiwek feat The Kemist	Jungle Terror EP Vol.2	Barong Family / Spinnin' Records
2015	Fired Up	LNY TNZ & Ruthless feat The Kemist	Fired Up – Single	Barong Family / Spinnin' Records
2015	Figure 8 (Tropkillaz VIP Remix)	Tropkillaz feat The Kemist	Figure 8 (Tropkillaz VIP Remix) - Single	SPA / Elemess
2014	Boss It Up	Dirtcaps feat The Kemist	Boss It Up – Single	
2014	Figure 8	Tropkillaz feat The Kemist	WHAAA!!! E.P.	SPA / Elemess
2014	Mash It Up	Black Lion & The Wizard feat Kat Dahlia, Nyanda & The Kemist	Black Lion Reggae Invasion Vol. 1	Tropic Electric
2014	Invasion	Dirtcaps feat The Kemist	Invasion – Single	Bad Manor
2014	Blazin	ChildsPlay feat The Kemist & Nyanda	Blazin – Single	Bad Manor
2014	F**k Up The Club	Black Lion feat The Kemist	F**k Up The Club – Single	Tropic Electric
2013	Assets	Yellow Claw (DJs) & Tropkillaz feat The Kemist	Amsterdam Twerk Music	Mad Decent / Jeffrees

==== As Composer / Writer ====
Year	Title	Artist	Album
2014	"You Got Me Good (Tu Es Ma Go)"	Muss feat. Nyanda	You Got Me Good – Single
2014	"I Love Sax"	Nyanda	I Love Sax – EP
2013	"Slippery When Wet"	Nyanda	Slippery When Wet – EP
2013	"Cool & Deadly"	F.eU DJ & Nyanda	Cool & Deadly – EP
2013	"Boom & Rave"	Black Lion feat. Mr. Vegas & Nyanda	Boom & Rave – EP

==== As remixer ====
Year	Title	Artist	Album	Label
2018	Growing Pains (The Kemist Remix)	Alessia Cara	Growing Pains (Remixes, Pt. 2) - Single	Def Jam Recordings
2018	Lions (Skip Marley vs The Kemist)	Skip Marley	Lions (Skip Marley vs The Kemist) - Single	Island Records
2018	Cautious (The Kemist Remix)	Tyler Shaw	Cautious (The Kemist Remix) - Single	Sony Music
2017	Stay (The Kemist Remix)	Zedd & Alessia Cara	Stay (Remixes) - EP	Interscope Records
2017	FAB. (The Kemist Remix)	JoJo feat Remy Ma	FAB. (The Remixes)	Atlantic Records
2016	Dancing Kizomba (The Kemist Remix)	Alx Veliz feat. Nyanda	Dancing Kizomba (The Kemist Remix – Single)	Universal Music
2016	Dancing Kizomba (The Kemist Remix)[Spanish Version]	Alx Veliz feat. Nyanda	Dancing Kizomba (The Kemist Remix – Single)[Spanish Version	Universal Music
2016	No Apologies. (The Kemist Remix)	JoJo feat. Wiz Khalifa & Nyanda	No Apologies. (Tropical Remix)	Atlantic Records
2016	Bloodclaut Song (The Kemist & MVL$ Remix)	Future Fambo	Bloodclaut Song (The Kemist & MVL$ Remix) - Single	Tropic Electric
2016	Faces & Lighters	Brian Cross feat. Vein, IAM CHINO & Two Tone	Faces & Lighters (The Kemist Remix)	Sony Music

=== Non-Singles ===
==== As lead artist ====
Year	Title	Artist	Album
2015	"One More Time"	The Kemist & Nyanda	Black Lion Reggae Invasion Vol. 1
2014	"Tun Up"	The Kemist	

==== As featured artist ====
Year	Title	Artist	Album
2015	"Punani"	Black Lion feat The Kemist, The Wizard & Dionne Renée	Black Lion Reggae Invasion Vol. 1
2015	"Hip-Nosis"	Black Lion feat The Kemist & Esco	Black Lion Reggae Invasion Vol. 1
2015	"Quati Wut"	The Wizard feat The Kemist	Black Lion Reggae Invasion Vol. 1

==== As composer / writer ====
Year	Title	Artist	Album
2015	"Cinnamon Roll"	Nyanda feat. Dionne Renee	Black Lion Reggae Invasion Vol. 1
2015	"Footprints"	Nyanda feat. Assassin	Black Lion Reggae Invasion Vol. 1
2014	"I Won't Take You Back"	Nyanda	"Xleration Riddim" – Single
2014	"Superman"	Arash feat (feat. Nyanda)	Superman
2014	"Ma Bala"	Arash feat (feat. Nyanda)	Superman
2013	"Club Saved My Life"	Wally Lopez feat Brick & Lace & J Balvin	Follow Me!

== Music videos ==
Year	Video Title	Director
2020	"We Made It"	Steven van der Vorm
2020	"Control You"	Alex Ceausu
2020	"On You"	Alex Ceausu
2019	"Mayhem 7.0"	Alex Ceausu
2018	"Body Can't Lie"	Michael Garcia
2018	"Lions"	Dameon Gayle
2017	"Big Dreamers"	Matteo Consales
2016	"We Don't Care"	Lny Tnz
2015	"Fired Up"	Lny Tnz
2014	"Mash It Up"	The Governor
