= The Take (song) =

Song by Tory Lanez featuring Chris Brown

from the album Chixtape 5
- Released: November 15, 2019
- Genre: R&B
- Length: 3:41
- Label: Mad Love, Interscope Records
- Songwriters: Tory Lanez; Chris Brown; Gonzalez; Sergio Romero; Anthony Woart, Jr.; Manesh Lad; Aaron Lobban; Lamar Edwards; James Fauntleroy; Harvey Mason; Steven Russell; Damon Thomas
- Producers: Tory Lanez; Play Picasso; Romero; Papi Yerr; Rajah; ALO905

Audio video
- "The Take" on YouTube

"The Take" is a song by Canadian singer Tory Lanez, featuring American singer Chris Brown, taken from Lanez' fourth studio album Chixtape 5, released on November 15, 2019, through Mad Love and Interscope Records. The song is based on a sample of Brown's 2007 hit single "Take You Down".

Despite not being released as a single, "The Take" charted in the United States, reaching number 66 on the Billboard Hot 100. The song also entered charts in Canada, Australia, Portugal, New Zealand, and the United Kingdom. It was certified platinum in the US, and gold in UK, Portugal and Australia.

== Critical reception ==
HipHopDX named it a highlight of Chixtape 5, saying: "the Chris Brown-assisted "The Take," an adaptation of Brown's "Take You Down," [turns] up the heat with Tory and Breezy showing excellent chemistry as they trade sultry bars, making for one of the best Collab efforts on the project".

== Charts ==
Chart (2019–20)	Peak position
Australia (ARIA)	73
Canada (Canadian Hot 100)	68
New Zealand Hot Singles (RMNZ)	13
Portugal (AFP)	58
UK Singles (OCC)	35
US Billboard Hot 100	66
US Hot R&B/Hip-Hop Songs (Billboard)	32

== Certifications ==
Certifications for "The Take"
Region	Certification	Certified units/sales
Australia (ARIA)	Gold	35,000^{‡}
Brazil (Pro-Música Brasil)	2× Platinum	80,000^{‡}
New Zealand (RMNZ)	Gold	15,000^{‡}
Portugal (AFP)	Gold	5,000^{‡}
United Kingdom (BPI)	Gold	400,000^{‡}
United States (RIAA)	Platinum	1,000,000^{‡}
^{‡} Sales+streaming figures based on certification alone.
