= Susie Singer Carter =

American film director

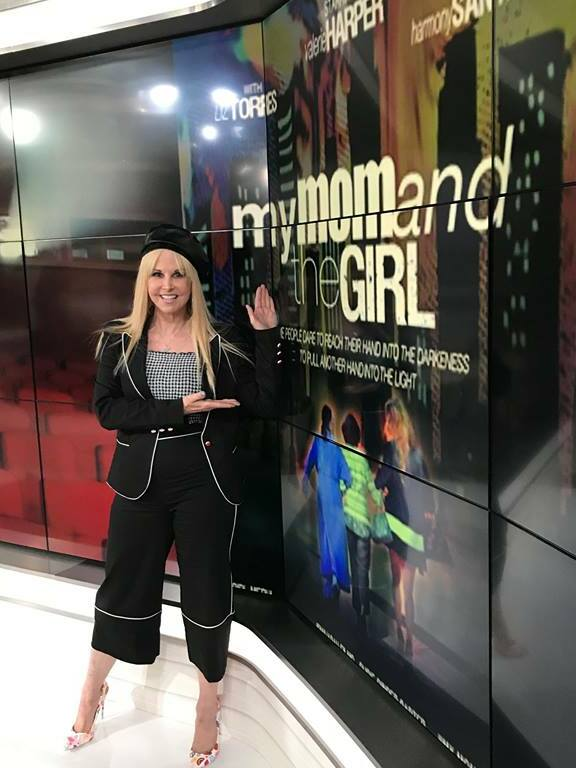
- Born: Los Angeles, California
- Occupations: Writer, Director, and Producer
- Years active: 1991-present
- Children: 2
- Website: https://www.gogirlmedia.com

Susie Singer Carter is an American film director. She is best known for her work on My Mom and the Girl, Soul Surfer, Bratz, Cake and Dance Revolution.

== Life and career ==
Susie was born in Los Angeles, California. She was majored in communication at University of California, Los Angeles and began writing for the Daily Bruin.

Susie began her career by writing and producing Dance Revolution and Cake for CBS. In 2007, she wrote and produced Bratz for Lionsgate but lost her credit in a Writers Guild arbitration, though her name appears as screenwriter on the final movie poster. In 2011 she co-produced Soul Surfer and penned the screenplay for the animated musical Twinkle Toes Lights Up New York. In 2016 she wrote, produced, directed and acted the short film My Mom and the Girl starring Valerie Harper, which won awards in Cleveland International Film Festival, Pittsburgh short film festival and Oscar qualified. Susie wrote and directed two documentaries, Breaking Good and Women Who Wrote the Way and it was premiered at the Writers Guild of America for Women's History Month in 2018. She is a member of the Alliance of Women Directors. she has 2 daughters

== Filmography ==
Year	Title	Writer	Director	Producer	Notes
1996	Pregnancy Massage Video	✗	✓	✗	Short Film
1997	The Brothers Flub	✓	✗	✗	TV series
2006	Cake	✓	✗	✓	TV series
2006–2007	Dance Revolution	✓	✗	✓	TV series
2011	Soul Surfer	✗	✗	✓	Feature Film
2016	Twinkle Toes Lights Up New York	✓	✗	✗	Animation Film
2016	My Mom and the Girl	✓	✓	✓	Short Film
2025	No Country For Old People; a Nursing Home Exposé	✓	✓	✓	Docuseries

As Actress

Year	Title	Role	Notes
1991	They Came from Outer Space	Tina	Episode: "High Five"
1991	Columbo	Darlene	Episode: "Columbo and the Murder of a Rock Star"
1991	Sisters	Marie	Episode: "Moving In, Moving Out, Moving On"
1991	Perfect Strangers	Bambi	Episode: "Bachelor Party"
1992	The Larry Sanders Show	Barbara	Episode: "Hank's Contract"
1993	Knots Landing	Randi	Episode: "Call Waiting"
1993	Falling Down	Suzie the Stripper	
1993	Sweating Bullets	Casey Born	Episode: "Tomorrow"
1994	A Dangerous Place	Mechanic	
1995	Kidnapped: In the Line of Duty	Lois Furman	TV movie
1997	Melrose Place	Hooker #2	Episode: "Screams from a Marriage"
1997	L.A. Johns	Beverly	TV movie
1998	Team Knight Rider	Krista	Episode: "The Ixtafa Affair"
1998	The Landlady	Venice Dorian	
2002	Out of These Rooms	Marlee	
2007	Bratz	Barbara Baxter Dimly	
2016	My Mom and the Girl	Susie	Short
2020	Smoking Wet	Carla Marino	Short
