= I'm 'n Luv (wit a Stripper) =

2005 single by T-Pain featuring Mike Jones

Single by T-Pain featuring Mike Jones

from the album Rappa Ternt Sanga
- Released: December 13, 2005
- Recorded: 2005
- Genre: R&B; hip-hop
- Length: 4:25 (album version); 4:00 (radio edit); 3:46 (no rap)
- Label: Konvict/Jive/Zomba
- Songwriters: Faheem Najm; Mike Jones
- Producer: T-Pain

T-Pain singles chronology
"I'm Sprung" (2005)	"I'm 'n Luv (wit a Stripper)" (2005)	"U and Dat" (2006)

"I'm 'n Luv (wit a Stripper)" (censored as "I'm 'n Luv (wit a Dancer)") is a song written and performed by American singer T-Pain featuring American rapper Mike Jones. Produced by the former, it was released on December 13, 2005, and was released as the second single from his debut album, Rappa Ternt Sanga. It peaked at number five on the Billboard Hot 100 chart, making it T-Pain's second top ten single, and Mike Jones's first. The track is T-Pain's third most successful single on the chart, tying with "Bartender". "I'm 'n Luv (wit a Stripper)" is also Mike Jones's highest charting single. The official remix of the song features Twista, Pimp C, R. Kelly, Too Short, Paul Wall and MJG, and was accompanied with its own music video.

== Background ==
T-Pain said during a USA Today interview that "I'm 'n Luv (wit a Stripper)" was inspired by a night when the singer took his friend to a strip club for the first time. "We got one girl to dance on him and he was just automatically trying to take her out of the club, pay for her tuition and do everything. The next couple days in the studio, everybody was still laughing about it. I started playing with GarageBand on my Mac and singing, 'I'm in love with a stripper,' and everybody was like, 'Yo, lay that down and we'll give it to (him) as a joke.' Then the label came in and we were going through some songs I had recorded. They heard the 'joke' and were like, 'This is the furthest thing from a joke. We're putting this out next week.' " The fact that it became a hit "threw me off. I was literally trying to make a bad song but it didn't work."

== Composition ==
"I'm 'n Luv (wit a Stripper)" is a hip-hop influenced R&B song. The song centers around a man who goes to a strip club and wants to take a certain girl over to his place to spend the night. T-Pain produced the song using Apple's GarageBand music software. It utilizes a steel string acoustic guitar, hip hop drum machine, and a chiptune synthesizer known as "Future Flute". The singer on the track uses the Auto-Tune vocal effect.

A censored version of the song was made, called "I'm 'n Luv (wit a Dancer)", to eliminate the sexual references.

== Music video ==
The original version of the music video appeared on MTV but was quickly removed due to strong sexual content. A new music video was made with less explicit sexual content.

== Official versions ==
1. "I'm 'n Luv (wit a Stripper)" (album version) – 4:25
2. "I'm 'n Luv (wit a Stripper)" (radio/video edit w. rap) – 4:00
3. "I'm 'n Luv (wit a Stripper)" (no rap version) – 3:46
4. "I'm 'n Luv (wit a Stripper)" (clean version) – 3:47
5. "I'm 'n Luv (wit a Stripper) 2 – Tha Remix" – 6:03

== Charts ==
=== Weekly charts ===
Chart (2006)	Peak position
Australia (ARIA)	24
Australian Urban (ARIA)	5
Canada CHR/Pop Top 30 (Radio & Records)	24
New Zealand (Recorded Music NZ)	2
US Billboard Hot 100	5
US Hot R&B/Hip-Hop Songs (Billboard)	10
US Pop Airplay (Billboard)	12
US Rhythmic Airplay (Billboard)	3

=== Year-end charts ===
Chart (2006)	Position
US Billboard Hot 100	41
US Hot R&B/Hip-Hop Songs (Billboard)	51
US Rhythmic (Billboard)	19

== Certifications ==
Region	Certification	Certified units/sales
United States (RIAA)	3× Platinum	3,000,000^{‡}
United States (RIAA) Mastertone	3× Platinum	3,000,000^{*}
^{*} Sales figures based on certification alone.^{‡} Sales+streaming figures based on certification alone.

== Remixes and parodies ==
A remix had been made featuring Twista, Akon, Pimp C, Paul Wall, R. Kelly, MJG and Too Short titled "I'm 'n Luv (wit a Stripper) 2 – Tha Remix". A video was also released for this remix, which is on iTunes.

An additional remix with the various artists includes verses by Busta Rhymes and Pitbull. Moreover, in the iTunes' Triple Play single, it includes a reggaeton remix.

Another remix features Keak da Sneak titled "I'm 'n Luv wit a Ripper".

The song is parodied by "Weird Al" Yankovic with "I'm 'n Luv wit the Skipper" during his Straight Outta Lynwood Tour. A Lighter Shade of Brown made a parody of the song called "I'm 'n Luv (wit Your Sister)".

Jeremy Jordan and Dexter Darden sang this song in the movie Joyful Noise.
