= JQT (group) =

South Korean girl group

JQT 제이큐티
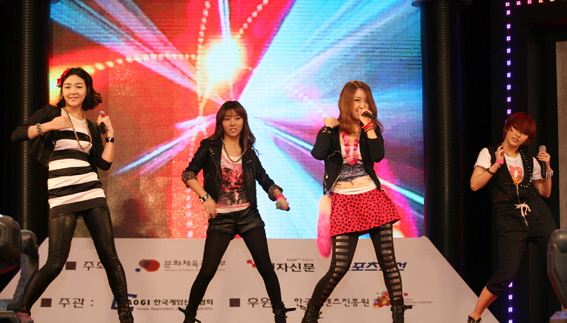
- JQT in November 2010

Background information
- Origin: Seoul, South Korea
- Genres: K-pop
- Years active: 2009–2012
- Labels: GP Entertainment (South Korea); Konvict Muzik (United States)
- Past members: Min Jung; Ga Jin; Ji Eun; Jin Kyung; Min Sun

JQT (Korean: 제이큐티) was a four-member South Korean girl group under GP Entertainment. The 'J' in the group's name comes from the common letter in each of the members' names, while the 'QT' stands for 'Quality' and 'Quartet'. Three of the four members are from the disbanded group i-13, a girl group that was considered the female equivalent of Super Junior. The group originally debuted in 2009 with Min Jung, Ga Jin, Ji Eun and Min Sun. In September 2011, it was announced that Min Sun would be leaving the group to focus on a career in acting. She was replaced by Lee Jin Kyung (now known as actress Lee Sun-bin), who was previously a trainee at GP Entertainment. On February 20, 2012, it was announced that JQT's contracts with GP Entertainment expired and would not be renewed; henceforth, they disbanded.

== History ==
=== 2009: Debut ===
At the end of September 2009, a teaser was published on various Korean websites. It showed three men spreading the letters 'JQT' across the city of Seoul with spray paint and colored paper. Many people thought they were advertising for a new boy group, but a few days later, it was revealed that JQT was a four-membered girl group. On October 12, their first showcase was released online. The group also released their first digital single 'BLING BLING', as well as the music video to "I Fell For You", on the same day. Following the release of their single, the group began to appear on various Korean shows.

=== 2010: No Need To Know ===
On August 13, JQT made an unexpected return to the music scene by releasing their second digital single 'Fourfme'. On August 13, a music video was released for the song "No Need To Know", which was promoted on various Korean music stations. On August 30, the group released an OST song for the anime "Shugo Chara!!" Nearly a month later, the group released two songs ("AH! Republic of Korea (Ver.1)" & "AH! Republic of Korea (Ver. 2)") for the 'G20 2010 Seoul Summit'. On December 15, JQT won their first ever award at the '18th Korean Culture Entertainment Awards'.

=== 2011: PeeKaBoo, Line-up Change and US Promotions ===
After a three-month musical hiatus, GP Entertainment announced that JQT would be releasing their first mini-album. The album, which contained six songs, dropped on January 13, along with the music video to “PeeKaBoo”. Promotions for “PeeKaBoo” began on January 14, on Music Bank. On May 11, it was announced that JQT would begin their advancement into America with American producer and Co-Ceo of Konvict Muzik Melvin Brown and his A&R Dwayne ‘D-Teck’ Grant . On September 5, 2011, it was announced that Min Sun officially withdrew from JQT. She was officially replaced by GP Entertainment trainee Jin Kyung on October 16. It was announced on December 17, that JQT officially signed under Konvict Muzik, a label created by American producer Akon.

=== 2012: Disbandment ===
On February 20, 2012, it was announced that JQT's contracts with GP Entertainment expired and would not be renewed. GP entertainment stated, “The members of JQT did not want to renew their contracts with GP Entertainment. That is why we have decided to disband JQT.” It was later announced that three members of JQT (Min Jung, Ji Eun & Ga Jin) would be switching labels to re-debut under the name S the ONE.

== Members ==
- Park Min Jung (박민정)
- Park Ga Jin (박가진)
- Lee Ji Eun (이지은)
- Lee Jin-kyung (이진경)
- Joo Min Sun (주민선)

== Discography ==
=== Extended plays ===
Title	Album details	Peak chart positions	Sales
Title	Album details	KOR	Sales
Peekaboo	Released: January 14, 2011; Label: GP Entertainment; Format: CD, digital download	51	KOR: 962

=== Singles ===
Title	Year	Peak chart positions	Album
Title	Year	KOR	Album
"I Fell For You" (반했어)	2009	—	Non-album singles
"No Need to Know" (알거 없잖아)	2010	48	Non-album singles
"Oh! Korea" (아! 대한민국)	2010	—	Non-album singles
"Peekaboo"	2011	83	Peekaboo

== Music videos ==
Year	Music video	Length
2009	"I Fell For You"	3:32
2010	"No Need To Know"	3:16
2011	"PeeKaBoo"	3:20
2011	"One By One"	3:26

== Awards and nominations ==
Year	Program	Category	Result
2010	18th Korean Culture Entertainment Awards	New Generation Popular Music Teen Singer Award	Won
