= Melvin Brown (music manager) =

- Origin: Orlando, Florida, U.S.
- Genres: R&B, soul
- Occupation: Record executive
- Years active: 2000–present
- Labels: Melvin Brown Music Group (MBMG), S&B Creative, Konvict Muzik
- Website: www.snbcreative.com

Melvin Brown is an American record executive and talent manager. Brown, a relative of fellow music executive Johnny Wright, is credited with having discovered Senegalese-American singer Akon in 2002. The following year, Brown, Akon, and the latter's brother Bu Thiam co-founded the record label, Konvict Muzik, as an imprint of Universal Motown Records. Konvict has signed artists including T-Pain, Cyhi the Prynce, and Verse Simmonds.

== Career ==
=== 2000–2002 ===
Melvin Brown began his career in media after graduating from Duke University and moving to Orlando, Florida to work as an assistant to his first cousin, record executive Johnny Wright. It was there he "learned the ropes" of the industry by working on projects for international superstars like the Backstreet Boys, *NSYNC, Boyz II Men, Britney Spears, and more. In 2002, while working for Wright, Brown discovered the then unknown recording artist Akon.

=== 2003–2009 ===
In 2003, Akon and Brown founded Konvict Muzik. Konvict Muzik has signed artists such as T-Pain, Verse Simmonds and Cyhi the Prynce.

=== 2011–2015 ===
In 2011, Brown formed the Melvin Brown Media Group (MBMG), a multimedia company.
