= Love Is Wicked (song) =

Single by Brick & Lace

from the album Love Is Wicked and Bratz: Motion Picture Soundtrack
- B-side: "Remix"
- Released: July 20, 2007
- Recorded: 2004
- Genre: Reggae fusion; R&B; dancehall
- Length: 3:43
- Label: 180 Entertainment; Kon Live; Geffen
- Songwriters: Nailah Thorbourne; Nyanda Thorbourne; Steven "Lenky" Marsden; Tasha Thorbourne
- Producers: Abraham Laboriel Jr; Mateo Laboriel; Ron Fair; Steven "Lenky" Marsden

Brick & Lace singles chronology
"Never, Never" (2007)	"Love Is Wicked" (2007)	"Get That Clear (Hold Up)" (2008)

"Love Is Wicked" is a song by Brick & Lace, released to iTunes on May 22, 2007 as the second single from the duo's debut album of the same title. The single is a slightly modified version of an earlier recording that Brick & Lace recorded sometime in 2004. The song uses the "Diwali Riddim" by Lenky. It is also included on the Bratz Motion Picture Soundtrack. In France, it was released as a single on September 8, 2008 and sold over 120,000 copies there during the summer of 2008.

== Music video ==
The music video for the song has been released. It shows the duo dancing, and singing on a summer day. The song has been featured on The Sims 2. The video was uploaded to YouTube on June 17, 2009 and it currently holds over 234 million views.

== Track listings ==
CD single

1. "Love Is Wicked" — 3:45
2. "Love Is Wicked" (MF remix) — 3:48

CD maxi

1. "Love Is Wicked" (radio edit) — 3:43
2. "Love Is Wicked" (alternate version) — 3:45
3. "Love Is Wicked" (instrumental) — 3:45
4. "Love Is Wicked" (a cappella) — 3:45

== Personnel ==
- Written by Nailah Thorbourne, Nyanda Thorbourne, Steven "Lenky" Marsden and Tasha Thorbourne
- Engineered by Eric Weaver and Seth Waldman
- Mixed by Dave "Hard Drive" Pensado
- Photography by Meeno
- Produced by Abraham Laboriel Jr, Mateo Laboriel, Ron Fair and Steven "Lenky" Marsden

== Charts ==
=== Peak positions ===
Chart (2007–2008)	Peak position
Belgium (Ultratop 50 Wallonia)	37
Belgium (Ultratop 50 Flanders)	44
European Hot 100 Singles (Billboard)	13
Finland (Suomen virallinen lista)	6
France (SNEP)	4
Norway (VG-lista)	13
Sweden (Sverigetopplistan)	27
Switzerland (Schweizer Hitparade)	63

=== Year-end charts ===
Chart (2008)	Position
French Singles Chart	39
French Airplay Chart	10
Swedish Singles Chart	94

== Certifications ==
Region	Certification	Certified units/sales
United Kingdom (BPI)	Silver	200,000^{‡}
^{‡} Sales+streaming figures based on certification alone.
