= I'm Sprung =

Single by T-Pain

from the album Rappa Ternt Sanga
- Released: August 9, 2005
- Recorded: 2005
- Genre: R&B
- Length: 3:51; 4:20 (album version)
- Label: Konvict; Jive; Zomba
- Songwriter: Faheem Najm
- Producer: T-Pain

T-Pain singles chronology
"I'm Sprung" (2005)	"I'm 'n Luv (wit a Stripper)" (2005)

"I'm Sprung" is the debut single written, produced, and performed by American singer T-Pain from his debut album, Rappa Ternt Sanga (2005). The song is dedicated to his wife, Amber. T-Pain thanked DJ Felli Fel for being the first person to play the song on the radio.

== Background ==
The singer said that the idea for the song originated from the 1997 movie Sprung. T-Pain said during a USA Today interview that "I'm Sprung" was written for his wife Amber: "It was brand new love. It was the kind of love that makes you write a song about it. I was experimenting with Auto-Tune at the time and I really got into it. It was fairly easy to get that done, because it was about something I am well-versed in: love." Before T-Pain had signed to Jive Records, "the song was already circulating. It was kind of surprising once I found out what label money does to a song — just seeing it spread once the label got involved was amazing. It surprised me how fast it happened, but I already knew it was a good song."

== Chart performance ==
"I'm Sprung" was a success on the Billboard Hot 100, peaking at number eight, becoming T-Pain's first Top 10 single. The song was in the 2005 and 2006 year-ends, albeit very barely both times. The single was also a success on the R&B charts, peaking at number nine, while peaking at number 14 on the Billboard Pop 100. While a big success in the United States, it was considered a moderate success in most European countries. On June 14, 2006, the single was certified platinum for sales of over a million copies in the United States.

== Remix ==
The official remix of this song was featured on the album as "I'm Sprung Pt. 2", which features Youngbloodz & Trick Daddy. The I'm Sprung remix is with Stat Quo. The U.K. remix features Dizzee Rascal. There is a Swishahouse Chopped & Screwed remix of the song. The most successful version of the song was co-produced by Jason, Armand and Brittany.

A remixed version titled "Jerry Sprunger" was released on 8 November 2019 by Tory Lanez and featured T-Pain.

== Music video ==
The music video was filmed in the summer of 2005 in Atlanta, GA. The producers worked to make it look like it could be Tallahassee, FL. Video appearances were made by Midget Mac (who was a contestant on I Love New York 2), Akon, Bone Crusher, Rasheeda, Sleepy Brown and Cyco Black of Crime Mob. At the end of the video for "I'm Sprung", music from "I'm 'n Luv (wit a Stripper)" plays.

== Charts ==
=== Weekly charts ===
Chart (2005–2006)	Peak position
Australia (ARIA)	37
Canada CHR/Pop Top 30 (Radio & Records)	16
Finland (Suomen virallinen lista)	11
Ireland (IRMA)	34
New Zealand (Recorded Music NZ)	11
UK Singles (Official Charts)	30
UK Hip Hop/R&B (Official Charts)	6
US Billboard Hot 100	8
US Hot R&B/Hip-Hop Songs (Billboard)	9
US Pop Airplay (Billboard)	14
US R&B/Hip-Hop Airplay (Billboard)	10
US Rhythmic Airplay (Billboard)	3

=== Year-end charts ===
Chart (2005)	Position
US Billboard Hot 100	95
US Hot R&B/Hip-Hop Songs (Billboard)	79

Chart (2006)	Position
UK Singles (OCC)	238
UK Urban (Music Week) "I'm Sprung" / "I'm 'N Luv (Wit a Stripper)"	1
US Billboard Hot 100	98
US Hot R&B/Hip-Hop Songs (Billboard)	81

== Certifications ==
Region	Certification	Certified units/sales
New Zealand (RMNZ)	3× Platinum	90,000^{‡}
United Kingdom (BPI)	Gold	400,000^{‡}
United States (RIAA)	4× Platinum	4,000,000^{‡}
United States (RIAA) Mastertone	Platinum	1,000,000^{*}
^{*} Sales figures based on certification alone.^{‡} Sales+streaming figures based on certification alone.

== Release history ==
Release dates and formats for "I'm Sprung"
Region	Date	Format	Label(s)	Ref.
United States	September 27, 2005	Mainstream airplay	SRC; Jive	
