= Brick & Lace =

Jamaican musical duo

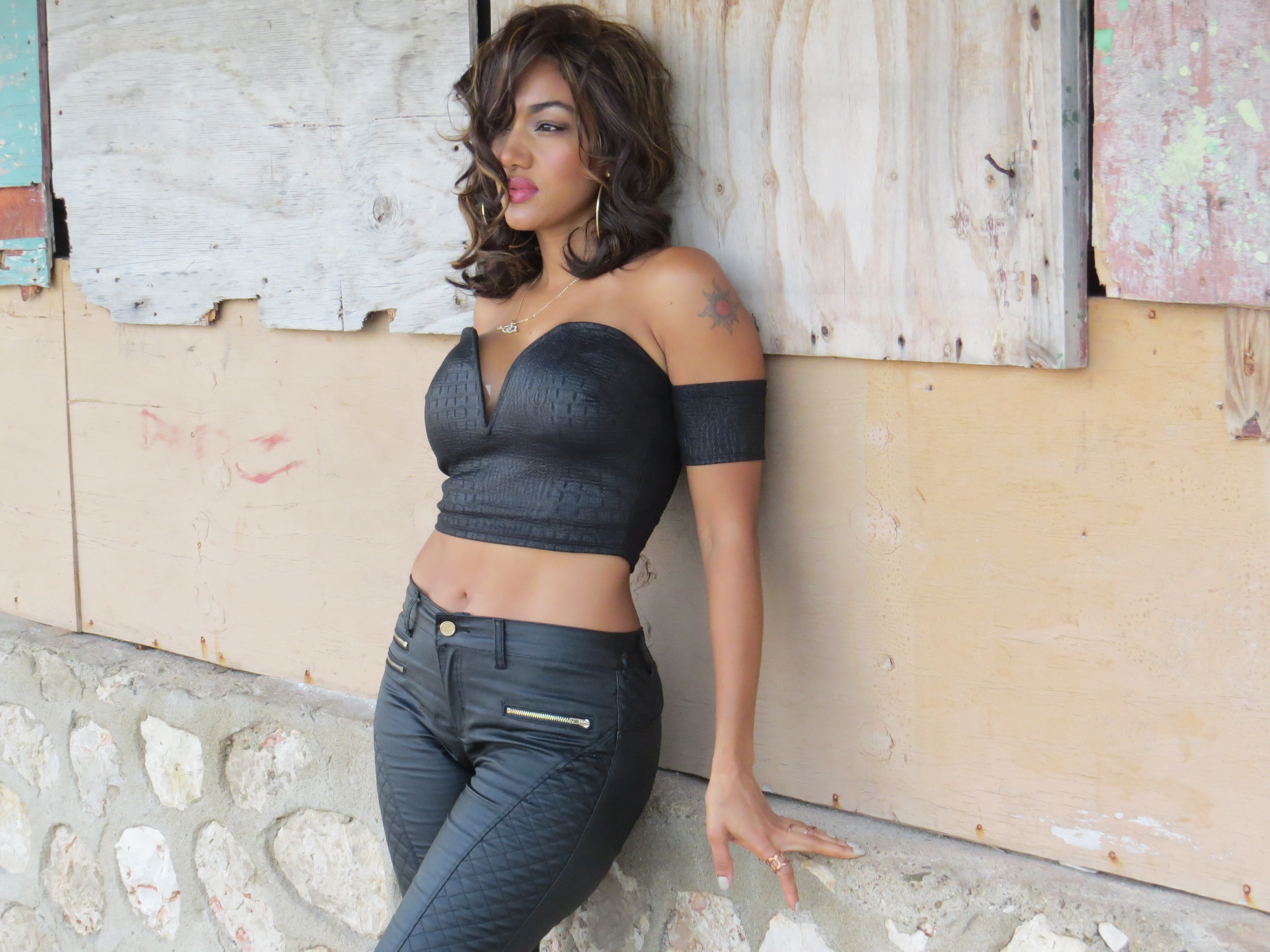
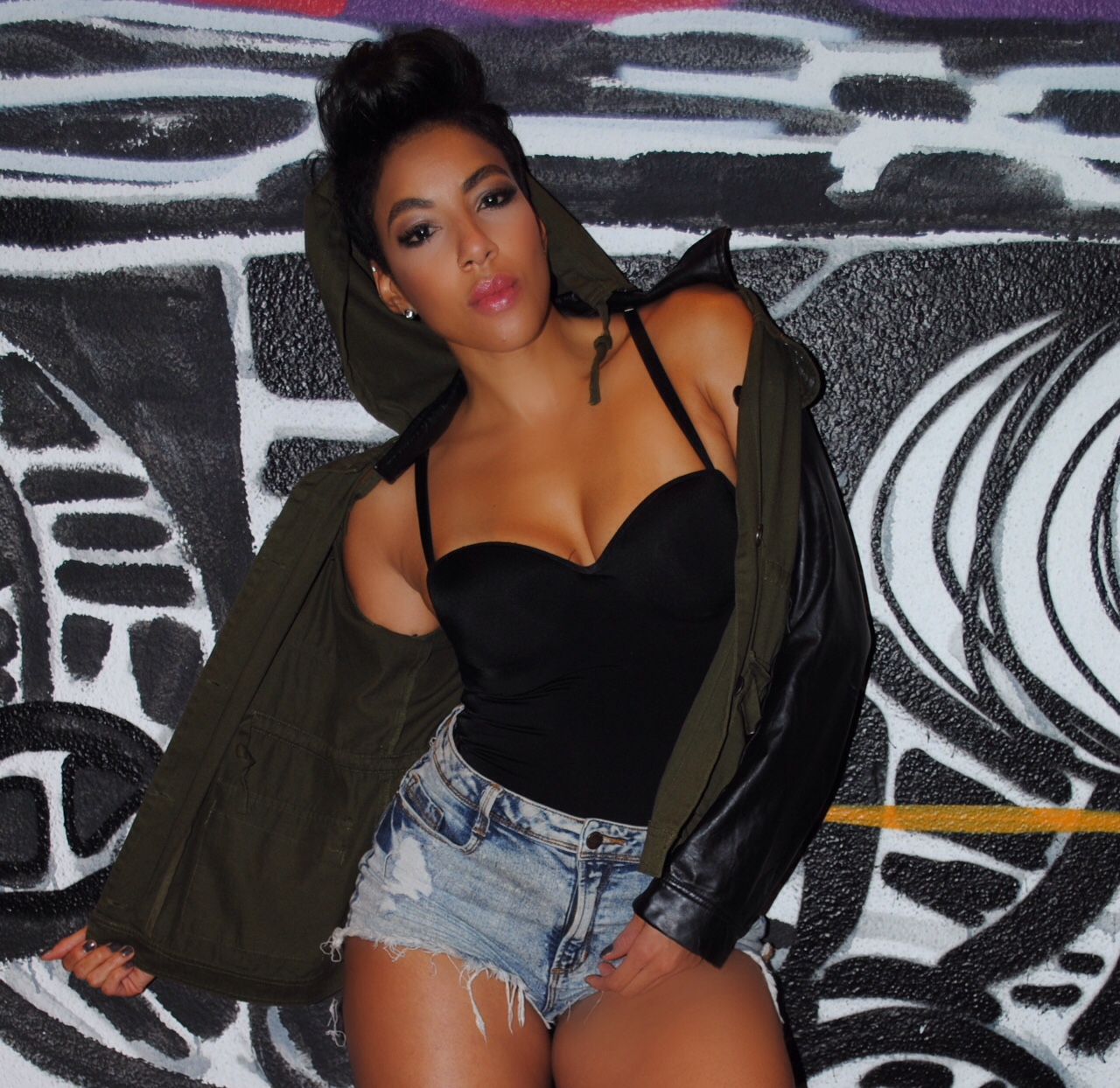
- Nyanda (left) and Nailah (right)

Background information
- Origin: Kingston, Jamaica
- Genres: Reggae fusion, R&B, hip hop, dancehall
- Years active: 2004–present
- Labels: Jive; 180; KonLive; Geffen
- Members: Nyanda Thorbourne; Nailah Thorbourne

Brick & Lace are a Jamaican-American dancehall/R&B (or reggae fusion) musical duo consisting of sisters Nyanda and Nailah Thorbourne. According to Billboard, their name reflects both the tough and soft sides of femininity.

Brick & Lace originally signed to the Geffen label as a trio with their third sister, Tasha.

Nailah and Nyanda continue to perform, but Tasha now works behind the scenes and co-writes songs for the group. Their first Geffen Records' single "Get That Clear" and their first album Love Is Wicked were both released in 2006.

== Career ==
=== Early life and career beginnings ===
Brick and Lace were signed by hip hop singer-songwriter Akon to his record label, Kon Live Distribution. Born to a Jamaican father and an African American mother, the duo has toured extensively throughout Africa, including shows in Kenya, Malawi, Nigeria, Rwanda, Senegal, Tanzania, Uganda, Zambia, and Zimbabwe.

=== 2007–10: Love Is Wicked and re-release ===
Their debut album, Love Is Wicked, had a limited release in various countries on 4 September 2007. The album included four singles, "Get That Clear (Hold Up)", "Never, Never", "Love Is Wicked" and "Take Me Back". "Love Is Wicked" was listed on six different charts, including the Sverigetopplistan Singles Top 60 (Sweden), and the SNEP Singles Top 100 (France). It reached No. 6 on the Official Finnish Charts Singles Top 20 . Its highest entry was No. 9 in the France Singles Top 100. "Never, Never" was a hit in both Finland and Kenya, where it reached No. 14 in 2008. Brick & Lace performed in Gwen Stefani's The Sweet Escape Tour on 24 May 2007, in Camden, New Jersey, filling in for Lady Sovereign, who failed to attend. In 2008 the sisters went on many tours to capitalise on the success of their first album, most notably in Europe and Africa. They also wrote new songs such as "Cry on Me" and "Bad to di Bone".

In 2009, Brick and Lace released their single "Bad to di Bone" which gained popularity in European and African countries. They also collaborated with French DJ/artist Junior Caldera. This new single was intentionally selected to appear on a new upcoming album, but instead was included on "Love is Wicked", which was re-released. In July 2009, the duo wrote another hit track called "Room Service", a summer hit released from the new Love is Wicked album.

In March 2010, they released four new songs, and the Brick and Lace Summer 2010 European Tour was announced straight after. A second single and music video promoting their second album was said to be "imminently soon" when the girls were interviewed in December 2009. They released "Bang Bang", "Ring The Alarm", and "Shackles" as buzz (promotional) singles for their upcoming album and withdrew "Club It Up" from internet markets - pegged for future plans. With two international platinum singles: "Love Is Wicked" and "Bad To Di Bone", the sisters completed the last of the Love Is Wicked International Tour era by producing a final tour for the African, European and Asian fans. Soon after May 2010, they revealed to African press that Nyanda was pregnant.

=== 2011–12: Independent return, new album plans and Bloodline ===
Starting off 2011, Brick and Lace toured in January and February internationally across Europe, Asia-Pacific and Africa. Soon after Nyanda, the elder of the two, who was already in late pregnancy, went on a break for health concerns and maternity leave. Brick and Lace's younger sister Candace filled in for her on tour. Brick and Lace toured Europe yet again in April, May and June 2011. It has been revealed that Nyanda returned to Brick & Lace performances after giving birth. The girls worked with French DJs, Golden Crew and Martiniquean artist Lynnsha, on their next hit song called "In Love with the Music". On 19 April 2011, Brick and Lace released this new single alongside Golden Crew. The song had a French version featuring Lynnsha. The French version appeared on Golden Crews album, while the international US version was to be on Brick and Lace's second album.

The duo ended their contract with Konlive Records and began working with Atlantic Records. They worked with Darkchild and other producers on their second album "Yupa".

In September 2011, Brick and Lace released a cover of Jennifer Lopez's hit single "I'm into You", at the request of fans who drew parallels between Lopez's single and the Jamaican duo's sound. The sisters also stated in an interview with Belgium Media 1 TV that they are "indeed currently working on their second album and have started a song-writing team with their two other sisters (Candace and Tasha Thorbourne).” Their song-writing team is called Bloodline, and they have released an official remix, done by Techno DJ Sydney Sampson, for their debut Bloodline single called "This Time". The single features production from Tearce Kizzo, who has worked with artists such as Eva Simmons, and it has been released under European label Spinnin Records.

In November 2011, Brick and Lace released the video for their new single, "This Time". The song encompasses Techno and House elements, which was new to Brick and Lace's style. The Jamaican sisters are not featured in the video, however the use of European Models and the producer, Tearce Kizzo, shows the scenes of a pool party in Ibiza. Starting off the year 2012, as their song writing team, Bloodline is currently working with producers Jonas Saeed & Niclas Kings for Jennifer Lopez and Wisin y Yandel, where they have received their first single placement, having written Wisin & Yandel ft Jennifer Lopez's new single, called "Follow The Leader".

Brick & Lace also released another single called "How I Like It", which features production from Swiss producer DJ Remady. The track is featured on his album called, The Original, and it encompasses dance and electro beats. The song has apparently gained recognition via the internet, although it is not a single for Remady's album.

In 2012, Brick & Lace also released bi-lingual music for their French fans with artists like Rim-K and Vincenzo. The track "Grenade" from Vincenzo's album La Matrice and "Take It to the Ring", a demo track by Dj Zack. As their song writing team Bloodline, the sisters co-wrote Christina Aguillera's "Around The World" from her album, Lotus.

=== 2013–present: solo careers, talk shows and break from Brick & Lace ===
After touring Africa with artists such as US rapper Eve, Brick & Lace started off the year 2013 by going on solo careers. This lead a wildfire rumour all over the internet stating that the sisters had split and that Brick & Lace was no more. However, according to their Twitter and Facebook pages, Nailah and Nyanda both decided to take a break from the Brick & Lace dynamic for at least a year, so that they may explore more of their own creativity as solo artists. However, each sister stated that they would return as Brick & Lace to continue working on their second album.

Nyanda, the elder of the two, released a dancehall remix to Taylor Swift's "I Knew You Were Trouble" single. The remix single gained positive reviews over the internet and has even been placed on many African charts and on the UK Top 30 club charts for a number of weeks. Nyanda has also been releasing many promotional singles, for her upcoming solo album, with hits such as "Like A Pro" with The Wizard and Chedda, and "Slippery When Wet (In the Middle)" with Black Lion Music Group. Nyanda also did a feature on Nicki Minaj & French Montana's "Freaks" single. Nyanda has also released a new dance hall single which features Black Lion and Mr Vegas, called "Boom and Rave". She released a House single in South Africa called "Cool & Deadly" with DJ Euphonik and DJ Fresh, and another English-French single ft Muss called "You Got Me Good".

Nyanda recently released a Music Video, on 26 June 2013, for "Slippery When Wet", which was directed by Muss as well.

The younger half, Nailah, under new stage name "Nyla", has also released her solo project, starting off with a signing under Ky-mani Marley's new record label, Konfrontation Music, and the debut of her solo single called "Stand Up", written by The Cave Production Team in Sweden and Bloodline, and produced by CMC Productions from Miami.

As their song writing team Bloodline, they are currently working with Pharrell's artist, Leah LaBelle and Christina Millian, on her upcoming album. One of their Bloodline demo tracks was leaked in April, called "Geisha Girl", where Brick & Lace fans were delighted to the sisters unexpected and unofficial "return". One of Bloodline's singles was also recently released and is sung by artist Leah Labelle and produced by Spanish DJ, Brian Cross called "Shot Gun", which appears on Brian Cross' 2013 album as its lead single. Nyanda also appears on the dancehall remix version of Leah Labelle's single "Lolita".

During the summer of 2014, Nyanda, Nailah and younger sister I-Candy were each nominated for RLM World Music Video Awards. Nailah won captured the Best R&B Video award with her song "Stand Up." Nyanda won the Best Dance Music Video award with her song "I Love Sax." She also won Best Female Artist and was featured on the Best Reggae Music Video winning song "Like a Pro" which was won by The Wizard.

During that year, Nyla also released her second single called "Body Calling" and a music video for it, directed by Rona Cohen. She also collaborated with Jamaican Reggae/Dancehall musician Sean Paul on "Pornstar," and African artist Redsan on "Touch Me There". Nyanda also worked with Ian Thomas on "Run Away". Nyanda and Nyla later reunited in November, as Brick & Lace once again, and went on to tour Australia.

2015 saw the start of both Nyanda and Nyla, joining their elder sister Tasha, to create their own production, an online talk show called Chit Chat. Chit Chat combines humor and style, touching on the latest fashions, news and trends. It was featured on YouTube, with a new episode airing every week.

On 23 March 2015, it was revealed that Nyla was working with Major Lazer on a song entitled "Light It Up", which was featured on Lazer's 'Peace Is The Mission' album, released 1 June; the song peaked at number 50 in Austria. The Light It Up Remix with Fuse ODG was released later on that year and charted as a European Single. Nyanda collaborated with Romanian artist TommoProduction on two singles, "Put It on Me" and the chart-topping "All My Love".

== Discography ==
=== Albums ===
Year	Album	Peak chart positions				Certifications
Year	Album	FRA	POL	SWI	BEL	Certifications
2007	Love Is Wicked: Released: 22 May 2007; Label: Geffen/180 Entertainment/Kon Live; Formats: CD, digital download	80	14	93	25	FR:Gold; POR: Gold

=== Singles ===
Year	Title	Chart Positions								Album
Year	Title	BEL	FR	POR	POL	FIN	NOR	SWE	SWI	Album
2006	"Get That Clear (Hold Up)"	—	—	—	—	—	—	—	23	Love Is Wicked
2007	"Love Is Wicked"	44	4	2	14	6	13	27	63	Love Is Wicked
2007	"Never Never"	—	—	—	—	14	—	—	—	Love Is Wicked
2008	"Take Me Back"	—	—	—	—	—	—	—	—	Love Is Wicked
2009	"Bad to Di Bone"	—	—	—	—	—	—	—	—	Love Is Wicked
2011	"In Love with the Music" (feat. Golden Crew)	—	—	—	—	—	—	—	—	Non-album singles
2012	"This Time" (feat. Kizzo)	—	—	—	—	—	—	—	—	Non-album singles
2012	"How I Like It" (feat. Remady)	—	—	—	—	—	—	—	—	Non-album singles
2013	"Club Saved My Life" (feat. Wally Lopez and J Balvin)	—	—	—	—	—	—	—	—	Non-album singles
2024	"Proof"	—	—	—	—	—	—	—	—	Non-album singles
