= Love Is Wicked =

2007 studio album by Brick & Lace

Studio album by Brick & Lace
- Released: September 4, 2007
- Label: Geffen; 180; Kon Live
- Producer: Akon; will.i.am; Cool & Dre; Supa Dups; Jazze Pha; Tony Kelly; Raphael Saadiq; Full Force; Midi Mafia; Rock City; Ron Fair; Chris Birch; Delano Thomas; Eddie O

Singles from Love Is Wicked
- 1. "Get That Clear (Hold Up)" Released: January 8, 2007; 2. "Never Never" Released: March 6, 2007; 3. "Love Is Wicked" Released: July 16, 2007; 4. "Get That Clear (Hold Up)" Released: January 8, 2008; 5. "Take Me Back" Released: May 13, 2008; 6. "Bad to Di Bone" Released: February 16, 2009

Love Is Wicked is the only studio album by Jamaican-American duo Brick & Lace. It had an initial release date of August 21, 2007, then it got moved to December 4, 2007, but then was pushed back further to 2008. It was eventually released in the United Kingdom and France. The album was also released in other countries (such as Belgium) in September 2007. Love Is Wicked is a mix of R&B and dance music with hip hop and reggae-dancehall elements.

Production came from Akon, as well as will.i.am, Cool & Dre, Jazze Pha and many others. Cham made a guest appearance on the remix of the album's lead single, "Never Never". Akon produced three songs for the album. The album was the first release on Akon's Kon Live Distribution label.

== Track listing ==
Love Is Wicked track listing
No.	Title	Producer(s)	Length
1.	"Get That Clear (Hold Up)"	Akon	4:07
2.	"Never Never"	Akon	3:42
3.	"Don't Stop"	Full Force; Johnny Nice	3:58
4.	"Take Me Back"	Perry Alexander; Tal Herzberg	4:07
5.	"Why'd You Lie?"	Full Force; Johnny Nice	4:13
6.	"Love Is Wicked"	Steven Marsden; Ron Fair; Abraham Laboriel, Jr.; Mateo Laboriel	4:01
7.	"Boyfriend"	Akon	3:42
8.	"Push It Up"	Tony Kelly	3:22
9.	"Buss a Shot"	will.i.am	3:18
10.	"Mr. Officer"	Cool & Dre	3:42
11.	"My Apple"	The Movement	4:10
12.	"U and Me"	The Triads	4:25

=== Re-release ===
1. "Love Is Wicked"
2. "Bad to Di Bone" (produced by Chris Birch)
3. "Buss a Shot"
4. "Take Me Back"
5. "Cry on Me" (produced by Delano Thomas)
6. "Room Service" (produced by Chris Birch)
7. "Get That Clear (Hold Up)"
8. "Push It Up"
9. "Why'd You Lie?"
10. "Don't Stop"
11. "U and Me"
12. "Never Never"

== Personnel ==
- Adam Alexander: Composer
- Perry Alexander: Producer
- Mark Barnes: Marketing Coordinator
- James "Chip" Bunton: Composer
- David Cabrera: Bass, Guitar
- Manu Chao: Composer
- AJ Crimson: Makeup
- Charlene Curry: Studio Assistant
- Nabil Elderkin: Photography
- Ron Fair: Bass, Composer, Executive Producer, Keyboards, Producer, String Arrangements, String Conductor
- Full Force: Composer, Engineer, Guest Appearance, Performer, Producer, Vocal Arrangement, Background Vocals
- Marcus T. Grant: Management
- Maurice Gregory: Composer
- Hylah Hedgepeth: Art Direction
- Tal Herzberg: Producer
- Daria Hines: Stylist
- Shawn "Tubby" Holiday: A&R
- Anthony Kelly: Composer
- Padraic Kerin: Engineer
- Abraham Laboriel, Sr: Producer
- Mateo Laboriel: Producer
- Steven "Lenky" Marsden: Composer, Producer
- Peter Mokran: Mixing
- Eddie Montilla: Keyboards
- Dave Pensado: Mixing
- Chris Perry: Composer
- Paul Simon: Composer
- Devyne Stephens: Creative Assistance
- Adonis Stropshire: Composer
- Aliaune Thiam: Bass, Composer, Drums, Guest Appearance, Producer, Programming
- Giorgio Tuinfort: Composer, Producer, Programming
- Andrew Van Meter: Production Coordination
- Seth Waldman: Mixing Assistant
- Eric Weaver: Mixing Assistant
- Josh Wilbur: Engineer
- will.i.am: Drum Programming, Producer
- Gita Williams: Marketing
- Kiyah Wright: Hair Stylist

== Singles ==
Singles from Love Is Wicked:

1. "Get That Clear (Hold Up)"
2. "Never, Never"
3. "Love Is Wicked"
4. "Take Me Back"
5. "Bad to Di Bone"

== Charts ==
Weekly chart performance for Love Is Wicked
Chart (2007–08)	Peak position
French Albums (SNEP)	80
Swiss Albums (Schweizer Hitparade)	93

== Release history ==
Release history for Love Is Wicked
Region	Date	Label(s)
Belgium	September 4, 2007	Geffen Records; 180 Entertainment; Kon Live Distribution
France	October 27, 2008	Geffen Records; 180 Entertainment; Kon Live Distribution
United Kingdom	May 23, 2009	Geffen Records; 180 Entertainment; Kon Live Distribution
