= Chopped 'n' Skrewed =

Single by T-Pain featuring Ludacris

from the album Three Ringz
- Released: September 23, 2008
- Recorded: 2008
- Genre: R&B; hip hop; chopped and screwed
- Length: 4:23
- Label: Nappy Boy; Konvict; Jive
- Songwriters: Faheem Najm; David Balfour; Christopher Bridges
- Producer: T-Pain

T-Pain singles chronology
"Go Hard" (2008)	"Chopped 'n' Skrewed" (2008)	"Freeze" (2008)

Ludacris singles chronology
"Wish You Would" (2008)	"Chopped 'n' Skrewed" (2008)	"Undisputed" (2008)

Music video
- "Chopped & Skrewed" on YouTube

"Chopped 'n' Skrewed" is the second single from American singer T-Pain's third album, Three Ringz. The song features American rapper Ludacris. It was first released on the Canadian iTunes on September 22, 2008, the same day the song was also added to T-Pain's MySpace. It was released in the US on iTunes on September 30.

The official remix features American singer R. Kelly.

== Background ==
The song has a futuristic beat and creates different scenarios about men being misled and blown off by women. The title and style of the song refers to the chopped and screwed genre of music created in Texas. It also features the autotune feature to produce its static and powerful beat.

T-Pain performed the song on Saturday Night Live on November 22, 2008 with Ludacris, along with "One More Drink". At the 2008 BET Hip-Hop Awards, T-Pain and Ludacris performed the song along with Lil Wayne. The instrumental of the song was used in a commercial bumper on Adult Swim, which T-Pain is associated with.

== Music video ==
The video, which features elements from "Can't Believe It", was expected to be released on October 14, along with the single release of the album's third single "Freeze", according to the iTunes Store countdown to Three Ringz. However it was released on October 12 and can be viewed on T-Pain's YouTube channel. The video features a cameo from DJ Khaled and Sophia Fresh.

== Remixes ==
The song was mashed up with The Pains of Being Pure at Heart by The Hood Internet. A remix of the song which featured R. Kelly was leaked on the Internet. There is also a remix by Screwed Up Click. It is featured on Swishahouse's mixtape Final Chapter 8.

== Chart positions ==
=== Weekly charts ===
Weekly chart performance
Chart (2008–2009)	Peak position
New Zealand (Recorded Music NZ)	14
UK R&B Chart	24
US Billboard Hot 100	27
US Hot R&B/Hip-Hop Songs (Billboard)	3
US Pop 100 (Billboard)	63

=== Year-end charts ===
Annual chart rankings
Chart (2009)	Position
US Hot R&B/Hip-Hop Songs (Billboard)	31
US Radio Songs (Billboard)	89

In the U.S., "Chopped 'n' Skrewed" was certified Gold by the RIAA, signifying sales of over 500,000 singles.

== Certifications ==
Region	Certification	Certified units/sales
New Zealand (RMNZ)	Gold	15,000^{‡}
^{‡} Sales+streaming figures based on certification alone.
