= Crystal Tamar =

American singer

- Born: Crystal Tamar Dawson; January 2, 1982 (age 44); Texas City, Texas, United States
- Genres: R&B, pop, soul
- Occupations: Singer, dancer, voice-over artist
- Years active: 2009–present
- Label: Atlantic
- Website: crystaltamar.com

Crystal Tamar Cohen (born January 2, 1982), professionally known as Crystal Tamar, is an American singer, dancer, and voice-over artist best known for being part of the girl group Sophia Fresh.

== Early life ==
Crystal Tamar was born on January 2, 1982, in Texas City, Texas to parents Christene Andrews and Mark Dawson, as the youngest of three sisters. She began performing at the young age of 7 as a part of the group En Touch (named after their favorite group, En Vogue) with her 2 older sisters and cousin. With the group managed by her father, they performed and won many talent shows across Texas including a Sammy Davis Jr. Award, won by Destiny's Child a year before.

In high school, Crystal Tamar formed another girl group, Beget, with three other classmates. They would continue to sing and perform until their junior year of college at Prairie View A&M University, where contractual issues caused Tamar to leave the group.

== Professional cheerleading: 2005–2008 ==
After cheering for the La Marque High School Cougars, and dancing on Prairie View Marching Storm Black Foxes, Crystal Tamar auditioned for the 2005 Houston Texans Cheerleaders squad.

For the first pre-season game of 2007, Crystal Tamar sang the National anthem for the annual Governor's Cup between the Houston Texans and Dallas Cowboys in front of a sold-out crowd of 70,000+ attendees, the largest crowd for a pre-season game at NRG Stadium.

Her final year as captain saw her voted as the teams representative for 2008 Pro-Bowl in Hawaii.

In 2015, Tamar was asked to return to choreograph the Texans vs Chiefs Halftime show featuring Bell Biv DeVoe.

== Music career ==
=== 2009–11: Sophia Fresh ===
Crystal Tamar's first break came in 2009, when she was reunited with her childhood friend from her previous group, Beget, to replace an existing member in the girl group Sophia Fresh. Sophia Fresh was signed to Atlantic Records/Co-Stars under the executive production of T-Pain. Sophia Fresh was also part of the Nappy Boy Entertainment family, along with Travie McCoy, Shawnna, One Chance, Taz Dizm, Young Cash and Jay Lyriq.

Upon joining Sophia Fresh, the group quickly released their first single together, "Superbad" featuring T-Pain and Cee-Lo Green. The group would go on to release "What It Is" featuring Kanye West. Singer Rihanna, speaking of the single said "It's a really new song, and I fell in love with it. I almost wish the song was mine. It's really, really incredible. There's no genre for it. The melody is very pop, but the beat is really gutter. It's a heavy hip-hop beat."

In an interview, singer Kandi Buress of Xscape described Sophia Fresh as the new TLC, saying "You know what! I really like T-Pain‘s girl group, Sophia Fresh. I think they’re very cool. I worked with Sophia Fresh and I worked with Rich Girl. Rich Girl is very cool, they’re dope. But there is something about Sophia Fresh, I think they have a lot of potential, if the label gets behind them right. Like I’ve heard a lot more of their songs and it's just different. I mean they’re like a new TLC or whatever, but there is something about them I’m really feeling."

Sophia Fresh toured with the T-Pain and Family Playlist Tour in 2008, Graduation tour in 2009, and went on to independently tour in the Pastry Tour in 2009, as well as the Seventeen Magazine Tour in 2009 performing across the United States and Canada.

In their first year together, Crystal Tamar and Sophia Fresh released their first mixtape entitled "So Phreakin' Fresh" which featured Kanye West, T-Pain, Akon and Jay Lyriq.

In 2010, the group contributed five songs to the "T-Pain Presents: Nappy Boy All Stars, Vol. 1" mixtape as well as being featured on the Step Up 3D soundtrack with their single "This Instant" featuring T-Pain.

The group eventually split in 2011 upon asking for a release from Atlantic Records to pursue personal endeavors, with Crystal Tamar moving back to Houston.

=== 2011–15: Features ===
After Crystal Tamar split with Sophia Fresh, she collaborated with 9th Wonder by featuring on various Jamla Records albums. In 2011, TamarTamar appeared on rapper GQ's first EP with the song "King of the Pack" and on Actual Proof's 2012 album "Black Boy Radio" with the song "So into You."

Crystal Tamar was featured on the 2014 Well Wishes album by Christian hip hop artist Bizzle song, "Did for Me", alongside Canton Jones. All proceeds for the album were used to build a water well in the South African town of Mozambique. She again collaborated with Bizzle in 2015 on his third studio album Surrender with the song "Feel Good."

=== EP Release ===
Crystal Tamar's self-titled debut solo EP was released on August 16, 2019 to all major platforms.

==== Singles ====
On August 28, 2018, SoulBounce premiered Crystal Tamar's first single titled "Nowhere." The single was produced by Cam Wallace and written by Kalenna Harper. Of the track, Soulbounce quotes Crystal Tamar explaining '"I could write a book about what this record means when I’m singing it. It embodies the sentiment I live by," she expounds about the track. "No matter where I am in this world, I'm nowhere if my love is not with me. I'm simply not growing or living if we are not experiencing it together."' On October 19, 2018, Crystal Tamar released a live acoustic version of "Nowhere" that was premiered by The Source Magazine. The Source described Crystal Tamar's music as having "...a level or realism that make each single relatable and fresh." On November 16, 2018, the acoustic version listed on Popdust.com's Release Radar. On July 12, 2019, the official video for "Nowhere" was released on Vevo. The video shows Crystal Tamar in front of various San Francisco landmarks such Palace of Fine Arts, Legion of Honor Museum, and in front of the Golden Gate Bridge at Fort Mason. The official single was released on July 30, 2019.

Crystal Tamar's second single "U Gon Love Me" was released on August 6, 2019. Of the single, Crystal Tamar says ""This is an anthem. It's something to sing out loud. It's saying, 'You gon love me. You gon love me. You won't put no one above me.' You can take it as a love song or take it as your anthem. It's saying, 'Hey I'm me. I can't give you anything else. And you are going to love it." The song was produced by Bangladesh and written by Racquelle Dolore.

On June 4, 2021, Crystal Tamar released the third single from her EP title "Serenade." Leading up to the release of the single, an acoustic performance of the song, recorded live at 25th Street Studios in Oakland, CA and featuring guitarist Ben Misterka, debuted on her YouTube channel. Speaking of the single, Crystal Tamar says "Serenade is my ballad baby of the album, I sifted through many submissions to find a record that would embody my old school R&B soul and pay homage to the true musicianship that my genre was birthed from. It rang loud and clear when I heard it. Those drums and demanding vocals when the verse opens gave me Jodeci, 'Freek'N You,' vibes. I said YESSSSS! The Gordon Brothers' penmanship and vocals were just what I was looking for." The official video for Serenade, filmed in Los Angeles, premiered on Vevo on June 17, 2021.

==== Track listing ====
| No. | Title | Writer(s) | Producer(s) | Length |
|---|---|---|---|---|
| 1. | "Intro" | | | 0:38 |
| 2. | "U Gon Love Me" | Racquelle Dolore | Bangladesh | 2:43 |
| 3. | "Gasoline" (featuring Cam Wallace) | Kalenna Harper, Cam Wallace | Cam Wallace | 3:55 |
| 4. | "Nowhere" | Kalenna Harper | Cam Wallace | 3:21 |
| 5. | "Interlude" | | | 1:02 |
| 6. | "Gimme Dat" | Racquelle Dolore | TBD | 3:17 |
| 7. | "Serenade" | Michael A. Gordon, Jon A. Gordon, Corei A. Gordon, Alanna Leonard | Christopher Duncanson, Michael A. Gordon | 3:36 |
| 8. | "WYA (Interlude)" | | | 1:33 |
| 9. | "Three Minutes" | Racquelle Dolore | TBD | 3:13 |
| Total length: | | | | 23:19 |

== Voice-over career ==
Crystal Tamar's voice-over career started in 2010 when she voiced the character Obamaniqua in the Adult Swim TV movie Freaknik: The Musical.

In 2017, Tamar voiced the character Dafina for the animated feature film "The Sky Princess."
