= On Top of the Covers =

Studio album by T-Pain
- Released: March 17, 2023
- Recorded: c. 2019–2023
- Genres: R&B; soul
- Length: 32:29
- Labels: Nappy Boy; Empire
- Producers: T-Pain; Blaqsmurph; Lil Rod

T-Pain chronology
The Lost Remixes (2020)	On Top of the Covers (2023)

On Top of the Covers is the seventh studio album by American singer T-Pain. It was released on March 17, 2023, through Nappy Boy Entertainment and Empire Distribution. It is a covers album, and marks the singer's first record in four years, following 2019's 1UP.

== Background ==
T-Pain said in a press release about the album: "This covers album has been years in the making. ... It got put on hold for a bit, but now that I'm independent, I'm able to do whatever I want to do through Nappy Boy Entertainment, and this is something I've felt strongly about for a long time. These songs are not what you'd expect when you hear that T-Pain is doing a covers album and that is what I think is cool about it."

T-Pain began working on On Top of the Covers in 2019 following his appearance and win on The Masked Singer. The project features T-Pain showcasing his natural singing voice, deviating from his usual Auto-Tuned style.

== Critical reception ==
The album has had a positive reception. The "War Pigs" cover has been highlighted by NME, Consequence and MetalSucks, with original Black Sabbath members Ozzy Osbourne and Geezer Butler also expressing their approvals of it. Osbourne called the cover the "best cover of War Pigs ever," while Butler referred to the cover as "great" and shared the track on Twitter.

HipHopDX listed it among the best R&B albums of the year, stating that "on an unvarnished and full-throated collection of cover songs, T-Pain flexes his vocal prowess completely without autotune. And the results speak for themselves."

The “War Pigs” cover was used as the secondary theme for WWE Survivor Series: Wargames 2024.

== Supporting tour ==
In support of On Top of the Covers, T-Pain performed three sold-out shows at The Sun Rose in Los Angeles, CA from March 17 to March 19. The shows consisted of T-Pain performing tracks from the new record as well as some of his greatest hits.

== Track listing ==
- All tracks are produced by T-Pain, Blaqsmurph & Lil Rod.

No.	Title	Writer(s)	Original artist(s)	Length
1.	"A Change Is Gonna Come"	Sam Cooke	Sam Cooke (1964)	3:42
2.	"Don't Stop Believin'"	Jonathan Cain, Steve Perry, Neal Schon	Journey (1981)	3:42
3.	"Sharing the Night Together"	Ava Aldridge & Eddie Struzick	Arthur Alexander (1976)	3:25
4.	"Skrangs (in K Major sus)"			2:47
5.	"Stay with Me"	Sam Smith, James Napier, William Phillips, Tom Petty, Jeff Lynne	Sam Smith (2014)	2:57
6.	"Tennessee Whiskey"	Dean Dillon, Linda Hargrove	David Allan Coe (1981)	5:14
7.	"That's Life" (featuring NandoSTL)	Dean Kay, Kelly Gordon, Fernando Tillman II	Marion Montgomery (1963)	4:18
8.	"War Pigs"	Tony Iommi, Ozzy Osbourne, Geezer Butler, Bill Ward	Black Sabbath (1970)	6:19
Total length:				32:29

=== Notes ===
- "Skrangs (in K Major sus)" is an instrumental track.
