= The Lost Remixes =

Compilation album by T-Pain
- Released: December 4, 2020
- Recorded: 2005–2008
- Genre: R&B; hip hop
- Length: 66:43
- Label: Nappy Boy; RCA
- Producer: T-Pain; Erik White; William Laseroms; Maarten Ten Hove; Joachim Vermeulen; Dean Gillard; Matt Ward

T-Pain chronology
1UP (2019)	The Lost Remixes (2020)	On Top of the Covers (2023)

The Lost Remixes is a compilation album by American singer T-Pain. It was released on December 4, 2020, by RCA and Nappy Boy Records. This contains unreleased verses, live performances, and remixes of hit songs that never fully released on streaming sites or that were released on original CDs. This album also commemorates the 15th anniversary of T-Pain's debut album "Rappa Ternt Sanga.

== Track listing ==
All tracks produced by T-Pain, except where noted.

The Lost Remixes track listing
No.	Title	Producer(s)	Length
1.	"T-Pain Beatboxing - Live at the Roxy Theater, Los Angeles, CA -2008"	Eric White	0:41
2.	"I'm N Luv (Wit A Stripper) 2 (feat. Pimp C, Too $hort, MJG, Twista & Paul Wall) - Tha Remix"		6:04
3.	"I'm N Luv (Wit A Stripper) - iSoul Clear Heels Remix"		6:21
4.	"I'm N Luv (Wit A Stripper) - South Rakkas Reggaton Mix - No Rap"		3:25
5.	"I'm Sprung - Live at the Roxy Theater, Los Angeles, CA -2008"	Eric White	1:58
6.	"I'm Sprung 2 (feat. Beenie Man) - Tony Kelly Dancehall Remix"		5:15
7.	"I'm Sprung (feat. Swishahouse) - Chopped & Screwed Remix"	T-Pain; Michael "5000" Watts	4:12
8.	"I'm Sprung (Remix) feat. YoungBloodZ & Trick Daddy"		4:10
9.	"I'm Sprung 2 (feat. Anthony Acid) - Dance Remix"		4:42
10.	"Studio Luv (feat. Lil' Wayne) - Remix"		4:06
11.	"Who The F*** Is That - Live at the Roxy Theater, Los Angeles, CA -2008"	Eric White	1:18
12.	"Buy U A Drank (Shawty Snappin') / Bartender Medley - Live at the Roxy Theater, Los Angeles, CA -2008"	Eric White	2:15
13.	"Buy U A Drank (Shawty Snappin') (feat. Kanye West) - Remix"		4:15
14.	"Buy U A Drank (Shawty Snappin') (feat. Yung Joc) - Acappella"		3:47
15.	"Church (feat. Teddy Verseti) - Future Presidents Remix"	T-Pain; William Laseroms; Maarten Ten Hove; Joachim Vermeulen	3:39
16.	"Calm The Fuck Doun"		4:02
17.	"Can't Believe It (feat. Lil' Wayne) - FP Remix"	T-Pain; Dean Gillard; Matt Ward	3:24
18.	"Can't Believe It - Live at the Roxy Theater, Los Angeles, CA -2008"	Eric White	3:09
Total length:			66:43
