= Everything Must Go (Vol. 1) =

Mixtape by T-Pain
- Released: August 17, 2018
- Genre: Hip hop
- Length: 44:44
- Label: Nappy Boy
- Producer: T-Pain

T-Pain chronology
Oblivion (2017)	Everything Must Go (Vol. 1) (2018)	1UP (2019)

Everything Must Go (Vol. 1) is the sixth official mixtape by American singer T-Pain. It was released on August 17, 2018, as a free digital download through his website.

== Track listing ==
All tracks written and produced by T-Pain, unless specified.

No.	Title	Length
1.	"Like Bam"	2:37
2.	"Miami" (featuring Ace Hood)	4:47
3.	"Rest Of Your Life"	3:16
4.	"Airplane"	3:27
5.	"Dance All Night"	3:56
6.	"Do It"	1:37
7.	"See Whats Happening"	2:50
8.	"Hallelujah"	3:19
9.	"She Wanna Go"	3:57
10.	"Time Nor Place"	3:13
11.	"Sittin Around"	3:47
12.	"That's Me" (featuring Joey Bada$$ & Joe Budden)	2:49
13.	"Two Week Notice"	5:03
Total length:		44:44
