= Dre Moon =

American hip-hop producer

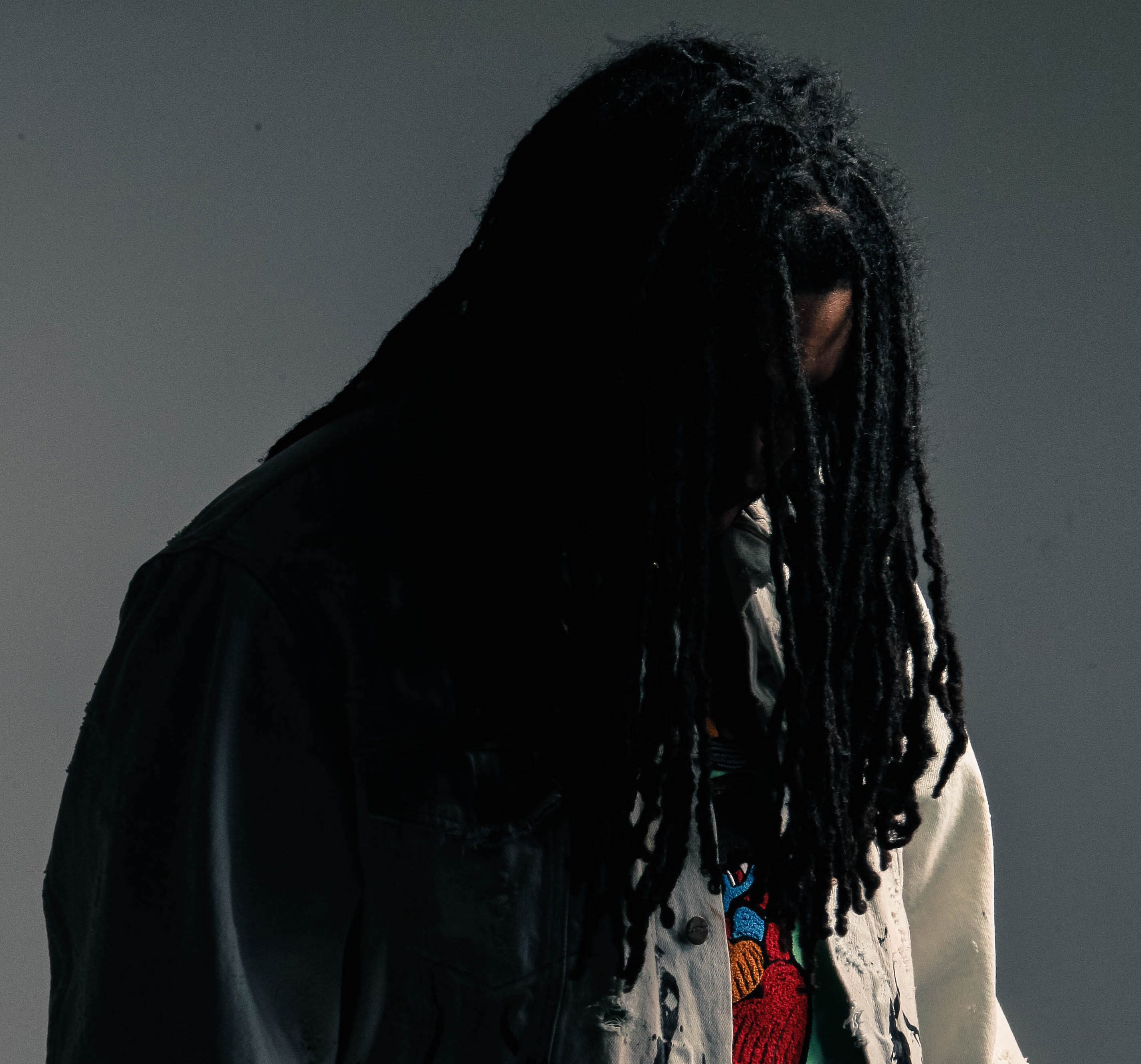

Background information
- Born: Andre Eric Proctor; June 9, 1991 (age 35); Silver Spring, Maryland, U.S.
- Genres: Hip hop; R&B
- Occupations: Record producer; songwriter; disc jockey
- Years active: 2009–present
- Labels: Boominati Worldwide; Freebandz
- Member of: The Order

Andre Eric Proctor (born June 9, 1991), better known by his stage name Dre Moon, is an American record producer from Brandywine, Maryland. He won Best R&B Song at the 57th Annual Grammy Awards for co-producing and co-writing Beyoncé's 2013 single "Drunk in Love." He serves as an in-hand producer for Metro Boomin's Boominati Worldwide.

== Early life and career ==
Andre Eric "Dre Moon" Proctor was born in 1991 in Silver Spring, Maryland. He began playing and composing music at age 11 while living in the small town of Brandywine with his parents and siblings. By the age of 18, Proctor relocated to Tampa, Florida where he met classmates Rasool Diaz and Brian Soko with whom he later formed production group The Order. Shortly after The Order was established, the group was contacted by Andy Kabamba, who found out about them through childhood friend, Arnold Soko. He called them to collaborate on music with platinum award-winning music producer Noel "DetaiL" Fisher, leading to exposure on a series of records. Dre Moon has since collaborated with industry icons including Drake, Future, Beyonce, T-Pain, Chris Brown, and Jeremih.

== Production credits ==
- The Weeknd: Heartless (Producer)
- 5 Seconds of Summer – "Old Me" (Producer)
- 21 Savage, Offset, Metro Boomin: Without Warning – "Mad Stalkers" (Producer)
- 24 Hrs: "Go Up Go Down" ft. T-Pain – Single (Producer)
- b.O.B: Underground Luxury – "Ready" (Producer)
- Beyoncé: Beyoncé – "Drunk in Love" (Producer – Grammy Won for Best R&B Song 2014)
- Beyoncé: Beyoncé – "Jealous" (Producer)
- Beyoncé: Beyoncé – "Standing on the Sun" (Remix) (Producer)
- Casper Nyovest: Tsholofelo – "Phumakim" (Producer)
- Chris Brown: Royalty – "U Did It" ft. Future (Producer)
- Chris Brown: Heartbreak on a Full Moon – "Run Away" (Producer)
- Cuz Lightyear: WHAT UP CUZ – "Luke C Walker" (Producer – featured on Madden NFL 18)
- DJ Esco: Kolorblind – "Check" (Producer)
- DJ Khaled: Kiss the Ring – "I Don't See Em" (Producer)
- Drake: Nothing Was the Same – "305 to my City" (Producer)
- Drake: Nothing Was the Same – "Pound Cake" (Producer)
- Drake: Nothing Was the Same – "Paris Morton Music 2" (Producer)
- Drake: Nothing Was the Same – "Own It" (Producer)
- Flipp Dinero: LOVE FOR GUALA – "Take a Lil' Time" (Producer)
- Flo Rida: Tell Me When You Ready – Single (Producer)
- Future: Hndrxx – "Hallucinating" (Producer)
- Future: Hndrxx – "Incredible" (Producer)
- Future: Hndrxx – "Solo" (Producer)
- Future: Honest – "I Be U" (Producer)
- Future: Honest – "I'll Be Yours" (Producer)
- Future: Honest – "Side Effects" (Producer)
- Future: Monster – "Throw Away" (Producer)
- Future: Purple Reign – "All Right" (Producer)
- Future: The Real Me – "Build a Bitch"
- Future: The Real Me – "Cast a Spell"
- Future: Save Me – "Love Thy Enemies" (Producer)
- Gucci Mane: Evil Genius – "Father's Day" (Producer)
- James Blake: Assume Form – "Mile High" (Producer)
- James Blake: Assume Form – "Tell Them" (Producer)
- Jeremih: Late Nights – "Royalty" ft. Future & Big Sean (Producer)
- Jennifer Lopez: A.K.A.- "I Luh Ya Papi" ft. French Montana (Producer)
- Juice WRLD: Goodbye & Good Riddance – "Armed and Dangerous" (Producer)
- Kid Ink: "Swish" ft. 2 Chainz – Single (Producer)
- K.O.: Skhanda Republic – "Mission Statement" (Producer)
- Lil Wayne: I Am Not a Human Being II – "Curtains" (Producer)
- Lil Wayne: I Am Not a Human Being II – "No Worries" (Producer)
- Metro Boomin: All Heroes Don't Wear Capes – "10am Save the World" (Producer)
- Nelly: M.O. – "100K" (Producer)
- Nelly: M.O. – "Give U Dat" ft. Future (Producer)
- Nicki Minaj: The Pinkprint – "Mona Lisa" (Producer)
- Nicki Minaj: The Pinkprint – "Put You In a Room" (Producer)
- Nicki Minaj: The Pinkprint – "Wamables" (Producer)
- Offset: Father of 4 – "After Dark" (Producer)
- Offset: Father of 4 – "Came A Long Way" (Producer)
- Offset: Father of 4 – "How Did I Get Here" (Producer)
- Offset: Father of 4 – "Lick" (Producer)
- Offset: Father of 4 – "North Star" (Producer)
- Ray J: Brown Sugar – Single (Producer)
- Rich Gang: Rich Gang – "100 Favors" (Producer)
- Rich Gang: Rich Gang – "Burn the House" (Producer)
- Rich Gang: Rich Gang – "Sunshine" (Producer)
- Rich The Kid: BOSS MAN – "Stuck Together" ft. Lil Baby (Producer)
- T-Pain: "F.B.G.M." ft. Young M.A. – Single (Producer)
- T-Pain: "See Me Comin" – Single (Producer)
- T-Pain: Oblivion – (Executive Producer)
- T-Pain: Oblivion – "2 Fine" ft. Ty Dolla $ign (Producer)
- T-Pain: Oblivion – "Goal Line" ft. Blac Youngsta (Producer)
- T-Pain: Oblivion – "I Told My Girl" (featuring Manny G) (Producer)
- T-Pain: Oblivion – "Pu$$y On the Phone" (Producer)
- T-Pain: Oblivion – "Straight" (Producer)
- T-Pain: Oblivion – "Textin' My Ex" ft. Tiffany Evans (Producer)
- T-Pain: Oblivion – "Who Died" (Producer)
- T-Pain: Oblivion – "Your Friend" (Producer)
- Teyana Taylor: VII – "Maybe" ft. Pusha T & Yo Gotti (Producer)
- Teyana Taylor: VII – "Do Not Disturb" ft. Chris Brown (Producer)
- Tinashe: Aquarius – "Pretend" ft. A$AP Rocky (Producer)
- Tinashe: Joyride – Me So Bad" ft. French Montana & Ty Dolla $ign (Producer)
- Tyga: Gold Album – 4 My Dawgs (Producer)
- Tyga: Hotel California – "Show You" (Producer)
- Tyga: The Gold Album: 18th Dynasty – "4 My Dawgs" ft. Lil Wayne (Producer)
- Wiz Khalifa: Blacc Hollywood – "True Colors" (Producer)
- Zoey Dollaz: M'ap Boule – "Post & Delete" ft. Chris Brown (Producer)
- Zoey Dollaz: Port-Au-Prince – "Cruise Ship" ft. Casey Veggies (Producer)
