= 1UP (T-Pain album) =

Studio album by T-Pain
- Released: February 27, 2019
- Recorded: 2018
- Genres: R&B; hip hop
- Length: 41:48
- Labels: Nappy Boy; Cinematic
- Producers: Aphillyated; Big Hack; Bishop Jones; BLWYRMND; Dave Cappa; Girl Talk; Tyler Rohn; Wavy

T-Pain chronology
Everything Must Go (Vol. 1) (2018)	1UP (2019)	The Lost Remixes (2020)

Singles from 1UP
- 1. "Getcha Roll On" Released: January 23, 2019

Professional ratings
Review scores
Source	Rating
Pitchfork	6.1/10
Exclaim!	8/10
Highsnobiety	3.5/5 stars
HipHopDX	3.9/5

1UP is the sixth studio album by American singer T-Pain, released on February 27, 2019. It is the follow-up to his 2017 album Oblivion. 1UP was preceded by the release of the singles "Getcha Roll On", "All I Want" and "A Million Times", and features appearances from Lil Wayne, Boosie Badazz, O.T. Genasis, Russ, Profit Dinero, Tory Lanez and Flipp Dinero.

== Background and release ==
1UP was released as a surprise album on February 27, 2019, as T-Pain had not announced a release date prior; its release date coincided with the season finale of The Masked Singer, where T-Pain was revealed as the champion.

T-Pain named the album after a term for an extra life in video games, saying on Beats 1: "I'm an avid gamer. I've been a gamer pretty much all my life. So I'm starting to implement gaming into my music and to my themes and stuff like that." The cover art for the album was created by Canadian artist Pencil Fingerz.

== Composition ==
Spin said the album features T-Pain's "customarily lascivious crooning and rapping across 12 tracks."

== Track listing ==
No.	Title	Producer(s)	Length
1.	"1UP" (featuring Profit Dinero)	Bishop Jones	4:33
2.	"RIP to the Parking Lot" (featuring Boosie Badazz)	Bishop Jones	4:02
3.	"U Up"	Big Hack; Bishop Jones	2:37
4.	"Getcha Roll On" (featuring Tory Lanez)	Girl Talk	3:54
5.	"Be Your X"	Bishop Jones	2:56
6.	"It's My Dog Birthday"	Bishop Jones	3:31
7.	"We All We Got"	Bishop Jones	2:48
8.	"Keep This from Me"	Big Hack; Bishop Jones	2:27
9.	"A Million Times" (featuring O.T. Genasis)	Tyler Rohn; Dave Cappa; Aphillyated	4:53
10.	"All I Want" (featuring Flipp Dinero)	Bishop Jones	2:41
11.	"Here It Comes" (featuring Russ)	BLWYRMND; Wavy	3:42
12.	"Goat Talk" (featuring Lil Wayne)	Bishop Jones	3:44
Total length:			41:48

== Charts ==
Chart (2019)	Peak position
US Billboard 200	115
