= Therapy (T-Pain song) =

Song by T-Pain featuring Kanye West

from the album Three Ringz
- Released: November 11, 2008
- Recorded: 2007–2008
- Genre: Hip hop; R&B
- Length: 3:34
- Label: Nappy Boy; Konvict; Jive; Zomba
- Songwriter(s): Faheem Najm; Kanye West; Frank Romano
- Producer(s): T-Pain; Akon; Rocco Valdes

"Therapy" is a song by American singer T-Pain that features rapper Kanye West, which is from Pain's third studio album, Three Ringz (2008).

== Background ==
The track wasn't the first of T-Pain and Kanye's work together, since West featured Pain on his 2007 single "Good Life". Around two weeks after the release of the album which features "Therapy", West released his fourth studio album 808s & Heartbreak, which T-Pain believes was influenced by him.

== Commercial performance ==
On November 29, 2008, the song debuted and peaked at number 6 on the US Bubbling Under Hot 100 and number 74 on the Digital Songs chart. This made it the only non-single from Three Ringz to enter any Billboard chart.

== Charts ==
Chart (2008)	Peak position
US Bubbling Under Hot 100 Singles (Billboard)	6
US Digital Song Sales (Billboard)	74
