= Undisputed (song) =

Single by Ludacris featuring Floyd Mayweather Jr.

from the album Theater of the Mind
- Released: October 14, 2008
- Recorded: 2008
- Genre: Hip hop
- Length: 4:36
- Label: Disturbing tha Peace; Def Jam
- Songwriters: Christopher Bridges; Donald "Don Cannon" Clark; Ivory Joe Hunter; Beatrice Verdi
- Producer: Don Cannon

Ludacris singles chronology
"Chopped 'n' Skrewed" (2008)	"Undisputed" (2008)	"One More Drink" (2008)

Music video
- "Undisputed" on YouTube

"Undisputed" is the third single from Ludacris' album, Theater of the Mind. The song features Floyd Mayweather Jr. and was released on iTunes on October 14, 2008.

The song samples "We'll Find a Way" by Edwin Starr and Blinky Williams.

== Music video ==
A music video was shot for "Undisputed". It features Ludacris, Floyd Mayweather Jr. and 6-year old boxer Pretty Boy Bam Bam.

== Chart positions ==
Chart (2008)	Peak Position
U.S. Billboard Bubbling Under Hot 100 Singles	12
