= Oblivion (T-Pain album) =

Studio album by T-Pain
- Released: November 17, 2017
- Recorded: 2014–2017
- Genre: R&B; hip hop
- Length: 62:13
- Label: Nappy Boy; Konvict; RCA
- Producer: A1; Abaz; Allstar; BZRK; Dre Moon; ISM; Major Seven; Mr. Franks; T-Pain; TBHits; X-plosive

T-Pain chronology
T-Wayne (2017)	Oblivion (2017)	Everything Must Go (Vol. 1) (2018)

Singles from Oblivion
- 1. "Goal Line" Released: September 28, 2017; 2. "Textin' My Ex" Released: November 10, 2017

Oblivion (stylized as OBLiViON) is the fifth studio album by American singer T-Pain, released through Konvict Muzik, RCA Records and his own label Nappy Boy Entertainment on November 17, 2017. It is his second album released after the closure of Jive Records and his final album under Akon's Konvict Muzik label. Recording sessions for the album took place from 2014 to 2017.

== Critical reception ==
Professional ratings
Review scores
Source	Rating
The Guardian	1/5 stars
HipHopDX	3.8/5
Pitchfork	6.7/10

HipHopDX said, "Fans of T-Pain will find that his fifth go-around is a quality cure for their six-year itch. One thing can be said for the rapper/singer: he never under-delivers — even if the expectation is for him to totally drop a masterpiece onto the world". Damien Morris of The Guardian expressed a negative response of the album saying that "the music is just tasteless and tired, the sound of a migraine struggling to maintain an erection". Pitchfork wrote that "Oblivion feels like a “business decision” album: it's a casual affair that frees him from his label obligation to RCA. It isn't exactly phoned in, but T-Pain has more in his tank than what he shows here, even though the tracks that reflect his past eras display his versatility and allow for optimistic glimpses of a career resurgence."

== Track listing ==
Credits adapted from Tidal and XXL.

No.	Title	Writer(s)	Producer(s)	Length
1.	"Who Died"	Faheem Najm; Andre Proctor; Tommy Brown	Dre Moon; TBHits	2:24
2.	"Classic You" (featuring Chris Brown)	Najm; Proctor; Floyd Bentley; Christopher Brown	T-Pain; A1	2:42
3.	"Straight"	Najm; Proctor	Dre Moon	2:57
4.	"That's How It Go"	Najm	Allstar	2:40
5.	"No Rush"	Najm; Ishmael Montague; Bentley	ISM; A1	2:49
6.	"Pu$$y on the Phone"	Najm; Proctor	Dre Moon	2:09
7.	"Textin' My Ex" (featuring Tiffany Evans)	Najm; Proctor; Tiffany Evans	Dre Moon	4:04
8.	"May I" (featuring Mr. TalkBox)	Najm; Byron Chambers	T-Pain	7:53
9.	"I Told My Girl" (featuring Manny G)	Najm; Proctor; Thomas Keßler	Dre Moon; X-plosive; Abaz	3:48
10.	"She Needed Me"	Najm	T-Pain	4:20
11.	"Your Friend"	Najm; Proctor; Brown; Steven Franks	Dre Moon; TBHits; Mr. Franks	4:05
12.	"Cee Cee from DC" (featuring Wale)	Najm; Omar Walker; Iain Adams II; Olubowale Akintimehin	Major Seven; BZRK	4:56
13.	"Goal Line" (featuring Blac Youngsta)	Najm; Proctor; Sammie Benson	Dre Moon	3:24
14.	"2 Fine" (featuring Ty Dolla Sign)	Najm; Proctor; Tyrone Griffin, Jr.	Dre Moon	6:15
15.	"That Comeback" (with Ne-Yo)	Najm; Shaffer Smith	T-Pain	2:47
16.	"Second Chance (Don't Back Down)" (featuring Roberto Cacciapaglia)	Najm; Roberto Cacciapaglia	T-Pain	5:00
Total length:				62:13

== Personnel ==
Credits adapted from Tidal and XXL.

Performers

- T-Pain – primary artist
- Chris Brown – featured artist (track 2) / background vocals (track 5)
- Tiffany Evans – featured artist (track 7)
- Mr. TalkBox – featured artist (track 8)
- Wale – featured artist (track 12)
- Blac Youngsta – featured artist (track 13)
- Ty Dolla Sign – featured artist (track 14)
- Ne-Yo – featured artist (track 15)
- Roberto Cacciapaglia – featured artist (track 16)

Technical

- T-Pain – recording engineer (tracks 7, 13)
- Fabian Marasciullo – mixing engineer (tracks 7, 10, 13)
- McCoy Socalgargoyle – assistant mixing engineer (tracks 7, 13)
- Colin Leonard – mastering engineer (tracks 7, 13)
- Javier Valverde – engineering (track 10)

Production

- Dre Moon – production (tracks 1, 3, 6, 7, 9, 11, 13, 14)
- TBHits – production (tracks 1, 11)
- T-Pain – production (tracks 2, 8, 10, 15, 16)
- A1 – production (tracks 2, 5)
- Allstar – production (track 3)
- X-plosive – production (track 9)
- Abaz – production (track 9)
- Mr. Franks – production (track 11)
- Major Seven – production (track 12)
- BZRK – production (track 12)

== Charts ==
Chart (2017)	Peak position
US Billboard 200	155
