= Can't Believe It (T-Pain song) =

Single by T-Pain featuring Lil Wayne

from the album Thr33 Ringz
- B-side: "Therapy"
- Released: July 29, 2008
- Recorded: 2008
- Genre: R&B; hip-hop; snap
- Length: 4:33; 5:22 (remix featuring Justin Timberlake)
- Label: Nappy Boy; Konvict; Jive
- Songwriters: Faheem Rasheed Najm; Dwayne Michael Carter, Jr.; David Balfour; Justin Timberlake (remix only)
- Producer: T-Pain

T-Pain singles chronology
"What It Is (Strike a Pose)" (2008)	"Can't Believe It" (2008)	"Go Girl" (2008)

Lil Wayne singles chronology
""My Life"" (2008)	""Can't Believe It"" (2008)	""Let It Rock"" (2008)

Alternative cover
- Digital cover art of the "Can't Believe It" Remix featuring Justin Timberlake.

"Can't Believe It" is a single by American singer T-Pain. It was released on July 29, 2008, as the first official single from T-Pain's album Thr33 Ringz. The song features rapper Lil Wayne, marking the second collaboration between T-Pain and Lil Wayne being released as a single.

== Music video ==
The video premiered on BET's Access Granted on Monday August 25, 2008, at 7:30 pm. It was made in front of a green screen and features many special effects. The video is mostly based on T-Pain's Thr33 Ringz; the music video had many effects from the circus. T-Pain served as an assistant director; however, he was never credited for it.

Dolla, MeMpHitz and the entire Nappy Boy Entertainment roster (Tay Dizm, Jay Lyriq, Sophia Fresh, Young Cash, and DJ Lil Boy) make a cameo appearance towards the end of the video.

== Remixes ==
The official remix features pop singer and Jive Records labelmate Justin Timberlake. It was released on November 7, 2008. The digital download single was released on December 5, 2008. There are two versions to the official remix; the first version, the main remix, has a duet 3rd verse with T-Pain and Justin Timberlake and the second version, the digital download & CD single remix, has the 3rd verse with Justin Timberlake only. The official Konvict Remix features Akon and Kardinal Offishall. There are other remixes by 50 Cent and Bow Wow. There's also a T-Wayne version where Lil Wayne has a second verse along with ad-libs throughout the entire song.

== Covers ==
Notable musicians have made covers of the song. R&B Singer JoJo has made a cover to this song. R&B Singer Trey Songz made a cover and renamed it "Gotta Believe It". Rapper Charles Hamilton has made a remake of this song entitled "Word? Aight!", which is a Soulja Boy diss record. Chris Richardson most popular for being on American Idol Season 6 has made a cover to this song. Travis Garland from boy band NLT has made a cover to this song; the track featured Kevin McHale also from NLT. Also was sampled by up and coming rapper Lil Dicky as "The Cootchie Song". Ghanaian-American singer Moses Sumney and jazz musician Sam Gendel released the cover of "Can't Believe It" on September 10, 2021.

== Track listing ==
=== Promo CD single ===
1. "Can't Believe It" (Clean)
2. "Can't Believe It" (Main)
3. "Can't Believe It" (Instrumental)
4. "Can't Believe It" (Acapella)

=== CD Remix ===
1. "Can't Believe It (Official Remix)" (featuring Justin Timberlake) – 5:22

== Chart positions ==
"Can't Believe It" debuted at No. 29 on the Billboard Hot 100 making it T-Pain's highest debut on the chart. It started gaining more airplay each week, causing it to rise up to the top ten peaking at No. 7 making it T-Pain's fifth top ten hit on the chart. It has also recently climbed up the charts due to increased sales after the release of the remix. The song also managed to just enter the UK top 100 at 100. This was because of little promotion and airplay, It was added to BBC Radio 1's Upfront List where it remained there for 3 weeks. The song was also A-listed on the BBC 1XTRA playlist.

=== Weekly charts ===
Chart (2008)	Peak position
Australia Physical Singles Chart (ARIA)	66
Canada Hot 100 (Billboard)	70
New Zealand (Recorded Music NZ)	13
Sweden (Sverigetopplistan)	21
UK Singles (Official Charts)	100
US Billboard Hot 100	7
US Hot R&B/Hip-Hop Songs (Billboard)	2
US Pop Airplay (Billboard)	25
US Rhythmic Airplay (Billboard)	2

=== Year-end charts ===
Chart (2008)	Position
US Billboard Hot 100	46
US Hot R&B/Hip-Hop Songs (Billboard)	26
US Radio Songs (Billboard)	29
US Digital Songs (Billboard)	70

Chart (2009)	Position
US Hot R&B/Hip-Hop Songs (Billboard)	69

== Certifications ==
Region	Certification	Certified units/sales
United States (RIAA) Mastertone	Platinum	1,000,000^{*}
^{*} Sales figures based on certification alone.
