= Theater of the Mind =

Studio album by Ludacris
- Released: November 21, 2008
- Recorded: January 2, 2007 – September 13, 2008
- Genre: Hip-hop
- Length: 60:15
- Labels: Disturbing tha Peace; Ebony Son; Def Jam South
- Producers: DJ Premier; 9th Wonder; Clinton Sparks & Kamau Georges; Sean Garrett; Wyldfyer; Scott Storch; LT Moe; Trackmasters; Don Cannon; Streetrunner; Swizz Beatz; Darkchild; DJ Toomp; The Runners

Ludacris chronology
| Release Therapy (2006) | Theater of the Mind (2008) | Battle of the Sexes (2010) |

Singles from Theater of the Mind
- 1. "What Them Girls Like" Released: August 7, 2008; 2. "Wish You Would" Released: September 2, 2008; 3. "Undisputed" Released: October 14, 2008; 4. "Last of a Dying Breed" Released: October 21, 2008; 5. "One More Drink" Released: October 28, 2008; 6. "Nasty Girl" Released: January 20, 2009

Theater of the Mind is the seventh studio album by American rapper Ludacris. It was released in the UK on November 21, 2008, and internationally on November 24, 2008, by Disturbing tha Peace and Def Jam South. Ludacris calls the album "theatrical", with guest performers credited as "co-stars".

== Background ==
The album was slated for release on October 21, but was pushed back to November 24. In April 2008, a song named "Let's Stay Together" appeared on xxlmag.com; supposedly from the new album. It is now an iTunes bonus song on the album. T.I. appeared on a track called "Wish You Would", produced by DJ Toomp.

The album cover was released on October 24, 2008, on wemix.com. The cover is an homage to Sly and The Family Stone's Life album, which had the band appearing as all the cinemas goers in the picture. Ludacris planned on releasing a sequel to this album in 2009.

In ’09, I’m definitely dropping another album. I’m working on a Battle of the Sexes album and a Theater of the Mind 2. With Battle of the Sexes, I’m trying to do some stuff with Shawnna."

Ludacris has been talking to T.I. and Young Jeezy about a tour together.

"I haven't confirmed anything yet. It's little talks here and there. But I'll put it out there: I would love to do a tour where it's me, T.I. and [Young] Jeezy. Me, Tip and Jeezy would be outrageous. But nothing is confirmed at the moment."

== Guests ==
Ludacris stated before the release of the album that, rather than featuring "guests", the tracks would have "co-stars", in keeping with the concept of the album as a "movie". "Co-stars" on Theater of the Mind include Nas, Plies, Jay-Z, T.I., Common, T-Pain, Willy Northpole, Rick Ross, Playaz Circle, Ving Rhames, Chris Rock, Spike Lee, Chris Brown, Sean Garrett, Lil Wayne, Floyd Mayweather Jr., Jamie Foxx, and The Game.

== Promotion ==
Ludacris released a "Gangsta Grillz" mixtape, with DJ Drama, titled The Preview. The mixtape was released as a digital download on July 28, 2008. This mixtape was well known for his disses toward George W. Bush, Hillary Clinton and John McCain.

== Leaks ==
On October 24, 2008, three songs from Theater of the Mind, "Do the Right Thing", featuring Common and Spike Lee, "I Do It for Hip Hop", featuring Jay-Z and Nas, and "Last of a Dying Breed", featuring Lil Wayne were leaked to the Internet. Ludacris commented on the situation:

Although I don't know where the leaks came from, the 3 songs leaked to the Internet today were unfinished tracks and premature versions of songs. I'm glad that my fans are excited about the new project, but to get the final masterpiece, the album Theater of the Mind premieres on November 24.

== Singles ==
=== Official singles ===
- The first single is "What Them Girls Like", featuring Chris Brown and Sean Garrett. The song peaked at number 33 on the Billboard Hot 100.
- The second single is "One More Drink", featuring T-Pain. It peaked at number 24 on the Billboard Hot 100.
- The third single is "Nasty Girl", featuring Plies and produced by Swizz Beatz. Despite failing to reach the Billboard Hot 100, it moderately entered the Hot R&B/Hip-Hop Songs and Hot Rap Songs charts.

=== Other songs ===
- The first promotional single, "Wish You Would" (featuring T.I.), was released on September 2, 2008. At the 51st Annual Grammy Awards, it was nominated for Best Rap Performance by a Duo or Group.
- The second promotional single, "Undisputed" (featuring Floyd Mayweather Jr.), was released on October 14, 2008.
- The song "Last of a Dying Breed" (featuring Lil Wayne) peaked at number 65 on the Billboard Hot 100.

== Critical reception ==
Professional ratings
Aggregate scores
| Source | Rating |
|---|---|
| Metacritic | 68/100 |
Review scores
| Source | Rating |
| AllMusic | 3.5/5 stars |
| The A.V. Club | B |
| Blender | 3/5 stars |
| Robert Christgau | (choice cut) |
| Entertainment Weekly | B |
| NOW | 4/5 Ns |
| Pitchfork | (5.3/10) |
| Rolling Stone | 3.5/5 stars |
| XXL | (XL) |
| Slant Magazine | 3/5 stars |

Theater of the Mind garnered a mild reception from music critics. Addi Stewart from NOW praised the cinematic concept throughout the record, from its title to the vast majority of featured artists on every track. Entertainment Weekly's Simon Vozick-Levinson said about the overall feel of the album: "Theater feels a bit like yet another Ocean's Eleven sequel. We've watched this movie more than a few times, but it's always fun to see this many talented pals cutting loose together." Josh Eells of Blender felt the lyrical content making up the whole concept record was lacking and too complacent for Luda, saying that "Punch line for punch line, Luda is still the best in the business, but these sex jams and hater disses feel too flat and perfunctory for his thousand-watt personality." He concluded that after the final track "the whole thing seems less like an album than a branding exercise—an obligatory effort to keep the “hip-hop star” line on his CV." Ken Capobianco, writing for The Boston Globe, called the album "darn good. Luda's lyrics are so sharp and supremely witty throughout. No one provides more quotable lines and pungent punch lines."

The A.V. Club's Nathan Rabin commended the upbeat tracks and lyrical collaborations with T-Pain, Nas/Jay-Z and T.I. but felt they were only decent retreads of Luda's previous material and lacked the strengths found in his guest verses on other people's records. He also compared it to Kanye West's 808s & Heartbreak on how it engages its respective fanbases, saying that Mind is "more immediately accessible, but ultimately less resonant" and could benefit from a "radical reinvention" that's similar to Heartbreak. Robert Christgau cited "I Do It for Hip Hop" as a "choice cut", indicating a good song on "an album that isn't worth your time or money." Ian Cohen, writing for Pitchfork, commended the first third for its lyrical boasts, criticized the middle portion's "one dimensionality" and "woefully underdeveloped" party jams and found the final half's hip-hop checklist tracks passable if the listeners can stomach the logic behind them, saying that "[W]hile Theater isn't quite as dire as the above may indicate, like every other Ludacris record, it doesn't grow on you-- in fact, it actually contracts." Billboard's Jeff Vrabel found Theater of the Mind was "stuffed with massive, flamboyant beats; overloud dirty-comic vocals; and all the usual lyrical stops: the streets ("Call Up the Homies"), women-slash-liquor ("One More Drink") and money, which is apparently important to him ("Wish You Would")."

== Commercial performance ==
The album debuted at number five on the Billboard 200, selling 214,000 copies in its first week, making it his sixth top 5 album on that chart. It was his first album since 2000's Back for the First Time and 2001's Word of Mouf to not reach number one status, and his lowest charting album in his career. As of March 2010, the album has sold about 671,000 copies, achieving a gold certification.

== Track listing ==
Theater of the Mind track listing
| No. | Title | Writer(s) | Producer(s) | Length |
|---|---|---|---|---|
| 1. | "Intro" | Christopher Bridges; Andrew Harr, Jermaine Jackson | The Runners | 1:55 |
| 2. | "Undisputed" (featuring Floyd "Money" Mayweather) | Bridges; Donald "Don Cannon" Clark; Ivory Joe Hunter; Beatrice Verdi | Don Cannon | 4:33 |
| 3. | "Wish You Would" (featuring T.I.) | Bridges; Aldrin Davis; Clifford Harris Jr.; Ron "8TRIX" Utley | DJ Toomp; 8TRIX | 4:47 |
| 4. | "One More Drink" (featuring T-Pain) | Samuel Barnes, Jean-Claude Olivier; Theo Bowen; Bridges; Alexander "Spanador" Mosely; Faheem Najm | Trackmasters | 3:41 |
| 5. | "Call Up the Homies" (featuring The Game and Willy Northpole) | William Adams; Bridges; Clinton Sparks; Jayceon Taylor | Sparks; Kamau Georges | 4:04 |
| 6. | "Southern Gangsta" (featuring Rick Ross, Playaz Circle and Ving Rhames) | Bridges; Earl Conyers; Tauheed Epps; Williams Roberts II; Nicholas Warwar | Streetrunner | 4:34 |
| 7. | "Everybody Hates Chris" (featuring Chris Rock) | Bridges; Johnny Bristol; Clark; William Robinson Jr. | Don Cannon | 4:54 |
| 8. | "What Them Girls Like" (featuring Chris Brown and Sean Garrett) | Bridges; Christopher Brown; Sean Garrett; Rodney Jerkins | Darkchild; Garrett^{[a]} | 4:02 |
| 9. | "Nasty Girl" (featuring Plies) | Bridges; Kasseem Dean; Algernod Washington | Swizz Beatz | 4:32 |
| 10. | "Contagious" (featuring Jamie Foxx) | Jason "Poo Bear" Boyd; Bridges; Scott Storch; Eric Bishop | Storch | 4:45 |
| 11. | "Last of a Dying Breed" (featuring Lil Wayne) | Eric Barrier; Bridges; Dwayne Carter Jr.; Wyatt Coleman; Giuseppe Donaggio; Youtha Fowler; William Griffin Jr.; Vito Pallavicini | Wyldfyer | 4:10 |
| 12. | "MVP" | Bridges; Christopher Martin | DJ Premier | 3:50 |
| 13. | "I Do It for Hip Hop" (featuring Nas and Jay-Z) | Bridges; Shawn Carter; Coleman; Fowler; Nasir Jones | Wyldfyer | 5:22 |
| 14. | "Do the Right Thang" (featuring Common and Spike Lee) | Bridges; Patrick Douthit; Lonnie Lynn; Arthur Verocai | 9th Wonder | 5:14 |
| Total length: | | | | 60:15 |

Notes

- ^{^[a]} signifies a co-producer

Sample credits

- "Undisputed" contains samples of "We'll Find a Way" performed by Edwin Starr.
- "One More Drink" contains samples of "Take That To The Bank" performed by Shalamar.
- "Everybody Hates Chris" contains samples of "It Takes a Whole Lotta Man for a Woman Like Me" performed by Gladys Knight & the Pips.
- "Last of a Dying Breed" contains samples of "You Don't Have to Say You Love Me" performed by Dusty Springfield, and "Eric B. Is President" performed by Eric B. & Rakim.
- "MVP" contains samples of "Virgo" performed by Nas, "DTP for Life" performed by Disturbing tha Peace, and "All Night Long" performed by Mary Jane Girls.
- "Do the Right Thang" contains samples of "Na Boca Do Sol" performed by Arthur Verocai.
- "Let's Stay Together" contains samples of "Everybody's Breakin' Up" performed by Billy Paul.

== Personnel ==
Credits for Theater of the Mind adapted from AllMusic.

- Joseph Alexander – keyboards
- Wayne Allison – engineer
- Chris Atlas – marketing
- Ken Bailey – A&R
- Christian Baker – engineer
- Dru Betts – vocals
- Leslie Brathwaite – mixing
- Don Cannon – engineer, score
- Andrew Coleman – engineer
- Jeff Dixon – executive producer
- DJ Premier – score
- Mike Donaldson – editing
- 8TRIX – score
- Jose "Zeek" Fendrick – A&R
- Zach Fisher – engineer
- Morgan Garcia – engineer
- Sean Garrett – score
- Kamau Georges – background vocals, mixing, score
- Jason Goldstein – mixing
- Don Goodrick – assistant
- Inaam Haq – engineer
- Artemus Jenkins – video director
- Eric Jensen – engineer
- Rodney Jerkins – score
- E. Jones – keyboards, keyboard arrangements
- Terese Joseph – A&R
- Doug Joswick – package production
- Gimel "Young Guru" Katon – mixing
- Erik Madrid – assistant
- Brandon Pena – mixing
- Mike Miller – assistant
- Aiyisha Obafemi Mitchell – marketing
- Nick Nastasi – assistant
- Rich Nice – A&R
- 9th Wonder – keyboard arrangements
- Erica Novich – A&R
- Dave Pensado – mixing
- Christian Plata – assistant
- Poke & Tone – drums
- Will Ragland – art direction, design
- Orlando Rashid – engineer
- Charles Roane – mixing
- J. Peter Robinson – art direction, design
- The Runners – score
- Glenn Schick – mastering
- Derrick Selby – engineer
- Clinton Sparks – score
- Chris Stanford – photography
- Scott Storch – score
- Crystal Streets – stylist
- Swizz Beatz – score
- Neo Tanusakdi – engineer
- Sean Taylor – A&R
- Justin "J.T." Trawick – assistant
- Javier Valverde – engineer
- Miles Walker – engineer
- Brian Warwick – engineer
- Finis "KY" White – engineer
- Mike "Hitman" Wilson – engineer
- Wyldfyre – score
- Keke and Amy — production coordination
- Mayne Zane – background vocals
- Chaka Zulu – executive producer

== Charts ==
=== Weekly charts ===
Weekly chart performance for Theater of the Mind
| Chart (2008) | Peak position |
|---|---|
| Canadian Albums (Billboard) | 22 |
| Swiss Albums (Schweizer Hitparade) | 66 |
| US Billboard 200 | 5 |
| US Top R&B/Hip-Hop Albums (Billboard) | 2 |
| US Top Rap Albums (Billboard) | 1 |

=== Year-end charts ===
Year-end chart performance for Theater of the Mind
| Chart (2009) | Position |
|---|---|
| US Billboard 200 | 50 |
| US Top R&B/Hip-Hop Albums (Billboard) | 10 |

== Certifications ==
Certifications for Theater of the Mind
| Region | Certification | Certified units/sales |
|---|---|---|
| United States (RIAA) | Gold | 500,000^{^} |
^{^} Shipments figures based on certification alone.

== Release dates ==
List of releases of Theater of the Mind
| Region | Date | Ref. |
|---|---|---|
| Australia | November 24, 2008 | |
| Canada | November 24, 2008 | |
| Japan | November 24, 2008 | |
| United Kingdom | November 24, 2008 | |
| United States | November 24, 2008 | |
| Switzerland | December 4, 2008 | |
| Jamaica | December 4, 2008 | |
| Poland | December 9, 2008 | |
| Mexico | December 11, 2008 | |
| Middle East | January 16, 2009 | |
| Costa Rica | January 16, 2009 | |
| South Africa | January 18, 2009 | |
| Italy | February 9, 2009 | |
| Ireland | February 15, 2009 | |
| New Zealand | March 5, 2009 | |
