= Freeze (T-Pain song) =

Single by T-Pain featuring Chris Brown

from the album Thr33 Ringz
- Released: October 10, 2008
- Recorded: 2008
- Genre: Pop; beatboxing; funk; R&B; dance
- Length: 3:38
- Label: Nappy Boy/Konvict/Jive
- Songwriters: T-Pain, Chris Brown
- Producer: T-Pain

T-Pain singles chronology
"Chopped 'n' Skrewed" (2008)	"Freeze" (2008)	"One More Drink" (2008)

Chris Brown singles chronology
"Superhuman" (2008)	"Freeze" (2008)	"Work That!" (2009)

"Freeze" is the third and final single from R&B singer T-Pain from his third album, Thr33 Ringz. The song features fellow singer Chris Brown. The song was released on iTunes on October 10 and was added to T-Pain's MySpace on October 17. A version that features Omarion was originally on the album, but was changed to Chris Brown.

== Critical response ==
The Guardian editor Alex Macpherson praised the production: "Thr33 Ringz' humour is still superbly crass and mostly enjoyable, especially when allied with the skittering beats and post-funk bounce of Freeze." Jesal 'Jay Soul' Padania of RapReviews.com called this song nice enough. Eric Henderson wrote a positive review: "Freeze" might be another freeze-dried Chris Brown upper, but it boasts the cleanest production this side of Ne-Yo."

== Music video ==
The shoot for the music video was released on YouTube on September 30 by Mike & Rocco (reality). The video was set to premiere on January 5, 2009 but leaked on December 31, 2008 and was officially released on January 1, 2009 via MTV Jams.

== Chart positions ==
"Freeze" debuted at number 38 on the Billboard Hot 100 in the US with downloads only, and also debuted at number 45 on the Canadian Hot 100 and number 62 on the UK Singles Chart due to digital downloads in those countries. Also in the US it charted on the Hot R&B/Hip-Hop Songs after its physical release at number 39. It has been most successful in Australia and New Zealand peaking at number 26 and number 23 respectively.

Chart (2008)	Peak position
US Billboard Hot 100	38
US Billboard Hot R&B/Hip-Hop Songs	39
US Billboard Pop 100	52
Canadian Hot 100	45
UK Singles Chart	62
UK Hip Hop/R&B (Official Charts)	31
Australian ARIA Singles Chart	26
Australian Urban Top 40	8
New Zealand Singles Chart	23

== Certifications ==
Region	Certification	Certified units/sales
New Zealand (RMNZ)	Gold	15,000^{‡}
^{‡} Sales+streaming figures based on certification alone.
