= One More Drink =

Single by Ludacris featuring T-Pain

from the album Theater of the Mind
- Released: October 28, 2008
- Recorded: 2008
- Genre: Hip-hop; R&B
- Length: 3:41
- Label: DTP, Def Jam
- Songwriters: T-Pain, C. Bridges, T. Bowen, J.C. Oliver, S. Barnes
- Producer: Trackmasters

Ludacris singles chronology
"Undisputed" (2008)	"One More Drink" (2008)	"Creepin' (Solo)" (2009)

T-Pain singles chronology
"Freeze" (2008)	"One More Drink" (2008)	"Imagínate" (2009)

Music video
- "One More Drink" on YouTube

"One More Drink" is the fifth official single off Ludacris' album, Theater of the Mind. The song "co-stars" T-Pain. The song was released on iTunes on October 28, 2008. Ludacris performed the song live while he and T-Pain appeared as musical guests on Saturday Night Live. The song samples Shalamar's "Take That to the Bank".

== Music video ==
The video was directed by Chris Robinson and was made available for digital download on iTunes Music Store October 28, 2008. The music video features comedian Katt Williams and Big Boi of Outkast, Playaz Circle, D. Woods formerly of Danity Kane, Vanessa Simmons, and Shareefa and Shawty. It premiered on BET's 106 & Park after T-Pain and Ludacris performed in promotion of T-Pain's third studio album, Thr33 Ringz.

== Chart positions ==
In the U.S. "One More Drink" debuted at number 86 on the Billboard Hot 100. It has since the peaked at number 24, making it Ludacris's fourteenth top-thirty hit on the chart. It has peaked number 4 on the Hot Rap Tracks, number 15 on the Hot R&B/Hip-Hop Songs, and number 35 on the Pop 100.

=== Weekly charts ===
Weekly chart performance
Chart (2008–2009)	Peak Position
US Billboard Hot 100	24
US Hot R&B/Hip-Hop Songs (Billboard)	15
US Hot Rap Songs (Billboard)	4
US Pop 100 (Billboard)	35
US Rhythmic Airplay (Billboard)	5
Hot Canadian Digital Singles	73

=== Year-end charts ===
Annual chart rankings
Chart (2009)	Position
US Hot R&B/Hip-Hop Songs (Billboard)	76
US Rhythmic (Billboard)	32
US Radio Songs (Billboard)	84

== Release history ==
Release dates and formats for "One More Drink"
Region	Date	Format	Label(s)	Ref.
United States	November 11, 2008	Mainstream airplay	Def Jam	
