= Freaknik: The Musical =

2010 American animated musical TV special

- Promotional poster
- Genre: Musical show Comedy
- Created by: Carl Jones; Nick Weidenfeld
- Written by: Carl Jones; Nick Weidenfeld
- Directed by: Chris Prynoski
- Creative director: Jacob Escobedo
- Voices of: (See Voice cast)
- Theme music composer: Tha Bizness
- Opening theme: "Freaknik Is Back", performed by T-Pain
- Ending theme: "Ghetto Commandments", performed by T-Pain, Snoop Dogg and Mack Maine
- Composers: T-Pain; Tha Bizness; Young Fyre and Bishop Jones (additional music)
- Country of origin: United States
- Original language: English

Production
- Executive producers: T-Pain; Carl Jones; Nick Weidenfeld
- Producer: Georgette Perna
- Editors: Dave Hughes; Nicholas Veith
- Running time: 44 minutes; 49 minutes (uncut version)
- Production companies: Titmouse, Inc.; Nappy Boy Entertainment; Williams Street

Original release
- Network: Adult Swim
- Release: March 7, 2010

Freaknik: The Musical is an American animated musical television special produced by T-Pain. It features the voice of T-Pain as the Ghost of Freaknik. Other entertainers providing voices include Lil Wayne, Young Cash, Snoop Dogg, Sophia Fresh, and Rick Ross, and comedians such as Andy Samberg and Charlie Murphy.

In March 2010, it was shown on the Cartoon Network's late night programming block Adult Swim. The musical is based on the actual music festival of the same name that used to take place in Atlanta, Georgia.

A soundtrack was released by Jive Records and Nappy Boy Entertainment in April 2010. The 49-minute uncut version of Freaknik: The Musical has been released on DVD and other forms of home media.

== Plot ==
The film starts at a party, that a group of young adults (Christopher "Kid" Reid and Affion Crockett) claim is the best party that they've ever attended. An elderly man (Lil Jon) joins the party and explains the history of Freaknik. He tells them that Freaknik threw the biggest party of all time, until it was broken up by the police in 1998. He claims the police "killed" Freaknik. Kid n' Play tries to convince them that Freaknik is an urban legend like Candyman, but as Play looks in the mirror, they are eaten by a swarm of wasps. The group is then led by the old man in summoning Freaknik, who appears as the Ghost of Freaknik Past (T-Pain).

The scene changes to a radio announcer named Mr. Thanksgiving (DJ Drama), who interviews Freaknik. Mr. Thanksgiving and Freaknik explain that a rapping contest will be held, the victor of which will get "a lifetime supply of money, clothes, and hoes". The scene changes to the bedroom of Virgil (Young Cash), Big Uzi (Rick Ross), and Light Skin (CeeLo Green), collectively known as the Sweet Tea Mobsters, a group of young adult rappers from Sweet Tea, Florida, who hope to achieve fame. The group decides to drive to Atlanta to participate in the contest, along with their weed-smoking (and supplying) friend Doela Man (DJ Pooh).

During their journey, Light Skin tells of a secret society of African Americans called the Boule, fraternity parlance for "a council of noblemen", that seeks to guide the course of Black culture. The members of this organization are parodies of Oprah Winfrey, Al Sharpton (Charlie Murphy), Bill Cosby (Kel Mitchell), Russell Simmons (Affion Crockett), O. J. Simpson, and Jesse Jackson. They wear medallions inscribed "10%", an allusion to the W. E. B. Du Bois essay The Talented Tenth, which says that a class of exceptional members of the Black race will rise to lead it.

The Sweet Tea Mobsters make a number of pit stops, including a detour at a college fraternity party where they meet two alcoholic fraternity members (Bill Hader and Andy Samberg). While Virgil is fueling the gas tank, a car, inhabited by four sexy-looking women (Sophia Fresh) named Leacosia (Crystal), Toprameneesha (Skye), Obamaniqua (Cole Rose), and Suzie (Crystal), arrives. He tried to refuse their enticements, but the girls beg in song, with Leacosia giving Virgil a kiss in the form of a gun. He accepts.

Meanwhile, Freaknik meets Rev. Sharpton, who tried to force him to work for the Boule. The plan fails, as Freaknik says that he will "never, ever turn his back on his own people". He escorts Sharpton out, via a trapdoor.

At the party, the group meets the Fruit Bowl Boys (Kel Mitchell, Affion Crockett, and Denzel Whitaker), who later become the group's biggest competition and are from the mostly white suburbs of Sweet Tea, Florida, although they resemble the Sweet Tea Mobsters. On their long, winding road trip, the Sweet Tea Mob gets lost in New Orleans and are confronted by a gangster (Snoop Dogg) who makes them visit his boss, Trap Jesus (Lil Wayne). Upon meeting Trap Jesus, the group loses hope, thinking it is the end, but instead he inspires them to compete and gives them one of his many Lamborghinis to use to get to Atlanta.

They crash the Lamborghini when Big Uzi becomes enraged after hearing the Fruit Bowl Boys talking about his jail experience. The group gives up, except Virgil, who believes that winning the contest is their destiny. The rest of the group still doesn't believe him, until they are given a ride in an airplane by the "Flying Malcolms."

Meanwhile, the Freaknik character is elected the "ghost mayor of Atlanta" and dubs the city "Freaknation." Soon after, President Barack Obama hands the presidency over to the ghost of Freaknik, a move that greatly angers Oprah, who wants to see Freaknik destroyed. She devises a plan to send a giant robotic monster called the "Perminator", a robotic version of Al Sharpton, rebuilt from Sharpton's corpse after he got hit by lightning while blowing out his hair, to Atlanta to destroy Freaknik.

Meanwhile, at the party, the Fruit Bowl Boys begin singing "Shank Ya in the Shower." The Sweet Tea Mobsters arrive at Atlanta at the same time as the Perminator begins its attack. It kills the Fruit Bowl Boys almost immediately. He seems to have Freaknik down for the count, but mass love from the crowd empowers Freaknik as the Mob performs, giving him the ability to grow to a monstrous size. Using the love of his fans, Freaknik is able to destroy the Perminator.

After the fight, Freaknik declares the Sweet Tea Mobsters the winners of the contest. Virgil refuses the prize and tears the check in half. He tells Freaknik that he doesn't need it, as long as Freaknik comes back every year. Before he can finish speaking, a golden lion statue-shaped ship comes in, inhabited by the members of the Boule. As Freaknik is about to disqualify them, a dog-shaped spacecraft called the "Mothership Connection" arrives, killing the Boule and their ship. Note: This scene can only be seen on the uncut version of the special.

It is inhabited by three brightly colored aliens, who are George Clinton, Bootsy Collins, and Gene "King Poo Poo Man" Anderson. They say they have come to take Freaknik because "there are other galaxies that need his powers of positivity", saying that maybe someday he will return and they can "funk it up" once again. Freaknik gives Virgil his gold chain and says that Atlanta will always be his home. Suzie approaches Freaknik, telling him her baby, which looks like Freaknik, needs a father.

Freaknik then rushes on board the ship with Clinton, Collins, and Anderson. Mr. Thanksgiving, the radio DJ from the beginning of the show, then speaks, saying how crazy that was and they'll see us next time. Freaknik is seen dancing on the Mothership as it leaves Earth. And after the end credits, we see Sweet Tea taping the check back together.

== Voice cast ==
- T-Pain as The Ghost of Freaknik Past
- Rick Ross as Big Uzi Theodore
- CeeLo Green as Light Skin Juliens
- DJ Pooh as Doela Man
- Young Cash as Virgil Gibson
- Lil Jon as the foreboding old dude
- DJ Drama as Mr. Thanksgiving
- Kelis as Tyra Banks
- Charlie Murphy as Al Sharpton
- Andy Samberg as Chad
- Bill Hader as Tad
- Affion Crockett as Russell Simmons, Fruit Bowl Boys member, Christopher Martin, Riff, Flying Malcolm #1, various
- Kel Mitchell as Fruit Bowl Boys frontman, Bill Cosby, various
- Big Boi as The Preacher
- Snoop Dogg as gang member #1
- Mack Maine as gang member #2
- Lil Wayne as Trap Jesus
- Sophia Fresh as Leacosia, Toprameneesha, Obamaniqua, Suzie
- George Clinton as an alien version of himself
- Bootsy Collins as an alien version of himself
- Gene "King Poo Poo Man" Anderson as an alien version of himself
- Corey Burton as The Balladeer, newscaster
- Christopher Reid as himself
- Maronzio Vance as Jesse Jackson
- Marlin Hill as Barack Obama
- Carl Jones as a landlord and a partygoer
- Liz Benoit as Oprah Winfrey
- Denzel Whitaker as a member of the Fruit Bowl Boys
- Georgette Perna as secretary, girl
- Reggie Boyland as a partygoer

Additional voices are provided by: Slink Johnson, Heather Lawless, Jason Van Veen, and Jason Walden.

== Production ==
Freaknik: The Musical originally evolved from a failed pilot entitled That Crook'd 'Sipp, created by Mike Weiss, Jacob Escobedo, and Nick Weidenfeld, as well starring David Banner. The pilot premiered on television in May 2007. Originally, the pilot was to receive six additional episodes scheduled to air sometime after 2007. The episodes never surfaced and the show's status remained up in the air until mid-2009 when the series was scrapped for good in order to create this special. Characters Big Uzi and Virgil all appeared in That Crook'd Sipp, while the model for character Caledonla Beauxregard was reused for the model of the character Suzy in Freaknik: The Musical. The fictional Sweet Tea Florida, which was the Sweet Tea Mob's hometown, was originally set in Mississippi in That Crook'd Sipp.

== Reception ==
In its original American broadcast on March 7, 2010, Freaknik: The Musical was watched by 797,000 viewers 18-34, making it the second most watched Adult Swim program of that night, behind a rerun of Family Guy.

IGN gave this episode a 6.1 out of 10, which is considered "Passable", and received comments both positive and negative.

== Home media ==
In March 2010, the animated special was released for purchase on the iTunes Store. The uncut 49-minute-long version of Freaknik: The Musical was released on one-disc DVD set in the United States in October 2010, from Warner Home Video, and included the soundtrack.

=== Soundtrack ===
It was announced by T-Pain that a soundtrack would be released through Jive Records, Konvict Muzik and Nappy Boy in April 2010. The track "Ghetto Commandments", the credits outro song, was released on iTunes as a single on March 23, featuring rappers Snoop Dogg & Mack Maine who play in the movie. It was released the same day as the release of T-Pain's promo single for his album "rEVOLVEr" "Reverse Cowgirl". The Rick Ross song "Grab Yo Beltloop" didn't make the final cut for the album.

| No. | Title | Producer(s) | Length |
|---|---|---|---|
| 1. | "Freaknik Is Back" (T-Pain a.k.a. Ghost of Freaknik) | Tha Bizness | 2:26 |
| 2. | "Save You" (T-Pain a.k.a. Ghost of Freaknik featuring One Chance's Jon A. Gordon, Michael A. Gordon) | Tha Bizness | 3:42 |
| 3. | "Ghetto Commandments" (T-Pain a.k.a. Ghost of Freaknik featuring Snoop Dogg & Mack Maine) | Tha Bizness | 4:47 |
| 4. | "We The Mob" (T-Pain a.k.a. Ghost of Freaknik featuring Young Cash a.k.a. Virgil) | Ky Miller | 3:02 |
| 5. | "Beat Build" (T-Pain a.k.a. Ghost of Freaknik featuring Young Cash a.k.a. Virgil & Rick Ross a.k.a. Big Uzi) | Tha Bizness | 3:31 |
