= Three Ringz =

Studio album by T-Pain
- Released: November 11, 2008
- Recorded: 2007–08
- Genre: R&B; hip-hop
- Length: 60:35 (standard); 73:08 (deluxe)
- Label: Nappy Boy; Konvict; Jive; Zomba
- Producer: T-Pain (exec.); Akon (exec.); Rocco Valdes (exec.); Tha Bizness

T-Pain chronology
| Epiphany (2007) | Three Ringz (2008) | The Instrumentals (2009) |

Alternative cover
- Import edition cover

Singles from Thr33 Ringz
- 1. "Can't Believe It" Released: July 29, 2008; 2. "Chopped 'n' Skrewed" Released: September 23, 2008; 3. "Freeze" Released: October 10, 2008; 4. "Boom" Released: December 20, 2008 (Philippines and Serbia) January 1, 2009 (Worldwide)

Three Ringz (stylized as Thr33 Ringz) is the third studio album by American singer T-Pain. It was released on November 11, 2008, by his record label Nappy Boy Entertainment, an imprint of Akon's label Konvict Muzik, Jive Records, and Zomba Label Group. It was supported by three singles: "Can't Believe It" featuring Lil Wayne, "Chopped 'n' Skrewed" featuring Ludacris, and "Freeze" featuring Chris Brown.

Reviews for the album were mixed, as critics were growing weary of the party-filled track listing and over-reliance on Auto-Tune. Three Ringz debuted at number four on the Billboard 200. It was nominated for Best Contemporary R&B Album at the 52nd Annual Grammy Awards, but lost to Beyoncé's I Am... Sasha Fierce.

== Singles ==
The album's lead single, called "Can't Believe It" was released on July 29, 2008. The track features a guest appearance from American hip hop recording artist Lil Wayne. with the production provided by T-Pain. The song peaked at number seven on the Billboard Hot 100.

The album's second single, called "Chopped 'n' Skrewed" was released on September 23, 2008. The song features a guest appearance from American rapper Ludacris, with the production, which once again was provided by T-Pain. The song reached number 27 on the Billboard Hot 100.

The album's third and final single, "Freeze" was released on October 10, 2008. The song features a guest appearance from American recording artist Chris Brown, with the production provided by T-Pain. The song peaked at number 38 on the Billboard Hot 100.

The single, "Boom" was the fourth and final single from T-Pain's repackaged album intended to be sold to the Philippines and Serbia. The track became an instant dance hit in those countries and became a staple piece of music used in hip-hop contests and shows in both Serbia and the Philippines.

=== Promotional singles ===
In late 2007, T-Pain released the first promotional single "Silver & Gold". However, it was cut from the final album track-listing. T-Pain released "Ringleader Man" as the album's promotional single.

== Critical reception ==
Professional ratings
Review scores
| Source | Rating |
|---|---|
| AllMusic | 3.5/5 stars |
| Daily News | 2/5 stars |
| Billboard | (Mixed review) |
| Village Voice | (Favorable review) |
| The Guardian | 3/5 stars |
| Rolling Stone | 3.5/5 stars |
| Slant Magazine | 3/5 stars |
| Spin | 3.5/5 stars |
| USA Today | 2/4 stars |

Three Ringz received mixed reviews, with many music critics questioning T-Pain's continued usage of Auto-Tune and his delivery of the club tracks. Jesel Padania of RapReviews said that despite the album's lack of humor and some tracks falling short of previous efforts, he praised T-Pain's genre-hopping production and his chemistry with the guest artists. AllMusic's David Jeffries also found the humor hit or miss but praised the record's production, guest list and T-Pain's persona for giving the tracks energy to grab listeners' attention, calling it "an otherwise entertaining example of the gimmick-filled R&B/hip-hop album done right." Eric Henderson of Slant Magazine praised tracks like "Can't Believe It" and "Freeze" for their production and catchiness but questioned whether T-Pain could move beyond his Auto-Tune crutch, concluding that "T-Pain’s got the pop credentials. It’s just a pity that this entire album is drenched in what already sounded like last year’s sound a couple years ago."

J. Gabriel Boylan of Spin criticized T-Pain for utilizing the same old tricks and delivery he had used on previous works before, concluding that "With a hot guest list (Ciara, T.I.), this is bound to bump the clubs, but beyond that, it’s clown time." Elysa Gardner of USA Today found the songs about women off-putting and disgusting, and said that more empathy and tenderness would help this record, concluding that "Ringz doesn’t offer enough wit or insight to mitigate its rancor, or make it terribly interesting."

== Commercial performance ==
Three Ringz debuted at number four on the Billboard 200, selling 167,700 copies in the first week. The album was certified gold by the Recording Industry Association of America (RIAA), selling 700,000 copies in the United States.

== Track listing ==
- All tracks produced by T-Pain except “Karaoke”.

| No. | Title | Writer(s) | Length |
|---|---|---|---|
| 1. | "Welcome to Thr33 Ringz (Intro)" | Faheem Najm; Frank Romano; Eddie Griffin | 1:25 |
| 2. | "Ringleader Man" | Najm; Johnny Smith | 2:54 |
| 3. | "Chopped 'n' Skrewed" (featuring Ludacris) | Najm; Christopher Bridges | 4:21 |
| 4. | "Brand New Show (skit)" (removed from edited version) | Najm | 1:02 |
| 5. | "Take a Ride (skit)" (removed from edited version) | Najm | 1:45 |
| 6. | "Blowing Up" (featuring Ciara) | Najm; Ciara Harris | 3:24 |
| 7. | "Freeze" (featuring Chris Brown) | Najm; Christopher Brown | 3:36 |
| 8. | "Can't Believe It" (featuring Lil Wayne) | Najm; Dwayne Carter, Jr.; David Balfour | 4:33 |
| 9. | "It Ain't Me" (featuring Akon and T.I.) | Najm; Aliaune Thiam; Clifford Harris, Jr.; Romano | 3:45 |
| 10. | "Feed the Lions (skit)" (removed from edited version) | Najm | 1:28 |
| 11. | "Therapy" (featuring Kanye West) | Najm; Kanye West; Romano | 3:34 |
| 12. | "Long Lap Dance" | Najm; Romano; Rocco Valdes | 4:36 |
| 13. | "Lorraine Interlude" | Najm | 1:00 |
| 14. | "Reality Show" (featuring Musiq Soulchild, Raheem DeVaughn and Jay Lyriq) | Najm; James Cohen; Taalib Johnson; Romano; Raheem DeVaughn | 4:27 |
| 15. | "Keep Going" | Najm; Romano | 2:14 |
| 16. | "Superstar Lady" (featuring Young Cash) | Najm; Joseph Williams | 3:17 |
| 17. | "Change" (featuring Akon and Diddy) | Najm; Thiam; Mary Jane Blige; Rocco Valdes; Gordon-Scott Kennedy; Wayne Kirkpatrick; Tommy Sims; Sean Combs | 5:10 |
| 18. | "Digital" (featuring Tay Dizm) | Najm; Artavious Smith | 3:14 |
| 19. | "Karaoke" (featuring DJ Khaled) (produced by Tha Bizness) | Najm; Khaled Khaled; Christopher Whitacre; Justin Henderson | 4:09 |
| 20. | "Drácula (skit)" (removed from edited version) | Najm | 0:38 |
| Total length: | | | 60:35 |

Deluxe edition (bonus tracks)
| No. | Title | Writer(s) | Length |
|---|---|---|---|
| 21. | "Distorted" | Najm | 2:24 |
| 22. | "Sweet" | Najm; Balfour | 3:58 |
| 23. | "Bad Side" | Najm; Romano | 2:35 |
| 24. | "Phantom" | Najm; Balfour | 3:36 |
| Total length: | | | 73:08 |

United Kingdom bonus tracks
| No. | Title | Writer(s) | Length |
|---|---|---|---|
| 21. | "Naked on the Dance Floor" | Najm | 3:17 |
| 22. | "Can't Believe It (FP Remix)" (featuring Lil Wayne) | Najm; Carter, Jr.; Balfour | 3:32 |

Japanese Bonus Tracks
| No. | Title | Writer(s) | Length |
|---|---|---|---|
| 21. | "Naked on the Dance Floor" | Najm | 3:17 |
| 22. | "Can't Believe It (Lost In Shibuya Remix)" (featuring Verbal of M-flo) | Najm; Verbal | 4:37 |

Denmark bonus track
| No. | Title | Writer(s) | Length |
|---|---|---|---|
| 21. | "Can't Believe It (Rishi Ram Remix)" (featuring Mauran) | Najm; Balfour | 4:35 |

Repackaged edition (Philippines and Serbia only)
| No. | Title | Writer(s) | Length |
|---|---|---|---|
| 21. | "Boom" (featuring Sin Sizzerb) | Najm; Filip Filipi | 3:35 |

Notes

- The Skits and Interludes are not mentioned in the physical copies of the album
- "Change" features uncredited vocals by Mary J. Blige.

== Charts ==
=== Weekly charts ===
| Chart (2008) | Peak position |
|---|---|
| Australian Albums (ARIA) | 79 |
| Canadian Albums (Billboard) | 24 |
| Japanese Albums (Oricon) | 40 |
| New Zealand Albums (RMNZ) | 30 |
| US Billboard 200 | 4 |
| US Top R&B/Hip-Hop Albums (Billboard) | 1 |

=== Year-end charts ===
| Chart (2008) | Position |
|---|---|
| US Top R&B/Hip-Hop Albums (Billboard) | 64 |
| Chart (2009) | Position |
| US Billboard 200 | 87 |
| US Top R&B/Hip-Hop Albums (Billboard) | 24 |

== Certifications ==
| Region | Certification | Certified units/sales |
|---|---|---|
| New Zealand (RMNZ) | Gold | 7,500^{‡} |
| United States (RIAA) | Gold | 500,000^{^} |
^{^} Shipments figures based on certification alone.^{‡} Sales+streaming figures based on certification alone.

== Release history ==
| Region | Date | Format | Label |
|---|---|---|---|
| Australia | November 7, 2008 | Digital download, CD | Jive Records |
| New Zealand | November 7, 2008 | Digital download, CD | Jive Records |
| United Kingdom | November 7, 2008 | Digital download, CD | Jive Records |
| Canada | November 11, 2008 | Digital download, CD | Jive Records |
| United States | November 11, 2008 | Digital download, CD | Jive Records |
| Japan | November 26, 2008 | Digital download, CD | Jive Records |
