= Future discography =

Future discography may refer to:

- Future albums discography
- Future singles discography
