= Sophia Fresh =

American R&B girl group

- Origin: Houston, Texas, U.S.
- Genres: R&B, hip hop, rap rock
- Years active: 2008–2011
- Label: Nappy Boy Entertainment/Atlantic
- Members: Skye; Crystal; Cole Rose
- Website: http://www.sophiafresh.com/

Sophia Fresh was an American R&B girl group comprising three members, Skye, Crystal Tamar, and Cole Rose. The trio was set to release their debut album with executive producer T-Pain before disbanding in 2012.

== Music career ==
The group was originally called Gyrlfriend and consisted of members Chelle, Skye, Cole Rose and Jade Johnson. The group signed their first major deal with J Records in 2005; however, the group eventually disbanded. Skye and Cole Rose then joined with Crystal to form Sophia Fresh. The girls decided on the name Sophia Fresh because it was "a reflection of three southern girls in one, united by hip hop".

In 2008, the group's manager took them to Atlantic Records and introduced them to singer/producer T-Pain. According to Cole Rose, "they took us to T-Pain, he loved us and the rest is history". T-Pain signed the trio as one of the first acts to his Atlantic imprint, Nappy Boy Entertainment. The group began recording their debut album with T-Pain, and were allowed the creative freedom to record their "very high energy, very edgy and funky" music. The group said that with J Records, "they had us in like a safe lane", but when recording with T-Pain, "we're free to be Sophia Fresh. We're free to do whatever - express ourselves. That's T-Pain. He talks about what he feels and that's what we're gonna do."

Sophia Fresh have confirmed that T-Pain will be "heavily involved" in the production of their album". For the album, the trio promised, "energy, expect fun, and expect the real because that's what we're talking about - just real situations. Expect to laugh, expect to cry... expect everything. We're three different girls with three different personalities and we're all showcase." T-Pain described Sophia Fresh as "a contemporary TLC". Despite Nappy Boy Entertainment being a digital label, T-Pain said that they would still release physical albums.

Sophia Fresh debuted their first song, "Lives In Da Club", on the soundtrack Step Up 2: The Streets, which was released in February 2008. In November 2008, Sophia Fresh released their debut single, "What It Is", featuring Kanye West. Singer Rihanna praised the song, exclaiming, "I fell in love with it. I almost wish the song was mine. It's really, really incredible. There's no genre for it. The melody is very pop, but the beat is really gutter. It's a heavy hip-hop beat." Another Sophia Fresh track, "This Instant" featuring T-Pain, was selected to appear on the Step Up 3D soundtrack.

The group made various cameos in T-Pain videos, mostly from the 2008 Three Ringz album, including "Can't Believe It" and "Chopped 'n' Screwed." They trio can also be seen briefly in DJ Khaled's 2010 video for "All I Do Is Win" alongside rappers Ludacris and Snoop Dogg.

Sophia Fresh played Leacosia, Toprameneesha, Obamaniqua, and Suzie in the 2010 Adult Swim TV movie Freaknik: The Musical.

== Discography ==
=== Albums ===
- Sophia Fresh (Unreleased)

=== Mixtapes ===
- So Phreakin' Fresh (Nov. 04, 2008)
- T-Pain Presents: Nappy Boy All Stars, Vol. 1 (2010)

=== Singles ===
- 2008: "Superbad" (feat. T-Pain & Cee-Lo Green)
- 2008: "What It Is" (feat. Kanye West)
- 2008: "Lives In Da Club" (feat. Jay Lyriq)
- 2009: "Do The Dance"
- 2009: "It's So Easy" (feat. T-Pain)
- 2010: "This Instant" (feat. T-Pain)
- 2012: "Love (What Did I Do)"
