= Nappy Boy Entertainment =

American record label

- Founded: 2005; 21 years ago
- Founder: T-Pain
- Distributor: Empire Distribution
- Genre: R&B and hip hop
- Country of origin: United States
- Location: Tallahassee, Florida, U.S.
- Official website: Nappy Boy Entertainment official website

Nappy Boy is an American record label founded by R&B and hip hop artist T-Pain. The label was distributed by RCA Records, formerly by Jive Label Group & currently by Empire Distribution. The label's current roster of artists includes NandoSTL, Young Cash and Chayo Nash.

In May 2008, T-Pain announced that he would like to turn Nappy Boy Entertainment into a new business venture which would turn his company digital, by releasing albums and songs online via iTunes. The new venture, Nappy Boy Digital, focuses on albums and songs released as downloads and ringtones, with few physical releases.

Featured in the Nappy Boy logo is the Florida State Capitol representing Tallahassee, Florida, where T-Pain was born.

== Artists ==
- T-Pain (Nappy Boy/RCA Records)
- Young Cash
- Chayo Nash
- NandoSTL

== Former artists ==
- Jay Lyriq
- Sophia Fresh
- One Chance
- Shay Mooney
- Tay Dizm
- Travie McCoy (Nappy Boy/Decaydance/Atlantic)
- Shawnna
- Field Mob
- Profit Dinero
- Piao
- SprngBrk (Formerly known as "A1" and "A1 Bentley")

== Producers ==
- L.a Chase
- Young Fyre
- Bishop Jones
- BlackPlay

== Albums released on label ==
Albums released on Nappy Boy Entertainment label
Year	Artist	Title	Album information	Peak chart positions				Certifications	Sales
Year	Artist	Title	Album information	US	US R&B	UK R&B	UK	Certifications	Sales
2007	T-Pain	Epiphany	Released: June 5, 2007; Singles: "Buy U a Drank (Shawty Snappin')", "Bartender", "Church"	1	1	—	—	US: Gold	US: 830,000
2008	T-Pain	Thr33 Ringz	Released: November 11, 2008; Singles: "Can't Believe It", "Chopped 'n' Skrewed", "Freeze"	4	1	—	—	US: Gold	US: 700,000
2010	Travie McCoy	Lazarus	Released: June 8, 2010; Singles: "Billionaire", "Need You", "We'll Be Alright"	25	—	11	27	US: Gold	US: 74,000
2011	T-Pain	Revolver	Released: December 6, 2011; Singles: "Best Love Song", "5 O'Clock", "Bang Bang Pow Pow"	28	7			US: —	US: 130,000

=== Singles ===
T-Pain

- 2008: T-Pain – "Can't Believe It" (feat. Lil Wayne)
- 2008: T-Pain – "Chopped & Skrewed" (feat. Ludacris)
- 2008: T-Pain – "Freeze" (feat. Chris Brown)
- 2009: T-Pain – "Take Your Shirt Off"
- 2010: T-Pain – "Reverse Cowgirl"
- 2010: T-Pain - "Rap Song" (feat. Rick Ross)
- 2011: T-Pain - "Best Love Song" (feat. Chris Brown)
- 2011: T-Pain - "Booty Wurk (One Cheek At a Time)" (feat. Young Ca$h)
- 2011: T-Pain - "5 O'Clock" (feat. Wiz Khalifa and Lily Allen)

Tay Dizm

- 2008: Tay Dizm – "Beam Me Up" (feat. T-Pain & Rick Ross)
- 2009: Tay Dizm – "Dreamgirl" (feat. Akon)
- 2009: Tay Dizm – "Nothing But the Truth" (feat. Young Cash & Piccalo)

Young Cash

- 2009: Young Cash – "I'm a Hustla"

Travie McCoy

- 2010: Travis McCoy – "Billionaire" (feat. Bruno Mars)

One Chance

- 2011: One Chance - "Sexin' on You"

Sophia Fresh

- 2008: Sophia Fresh – "Superbad" (feat. T-Pain & Cee-Lo Green)
- 2008: Sophia Fresh – "What It Is" (feat. Kanye West)
- 2009: Sophia Fresh – "It's So Easy" (feat. T-Pain)
- 2009: Sophia Fresh – "Do the Dance"

Ahmed Belvin

- 2009: A.B. – "Trophy Girl" (feat. T-Pain)

=== EPs ===
- 2010: T-Pain - Freaknik: The Musical (Soundtrack) - EP

=== Other media ===
- 2010: Freaknik: The Musical
- 2010: T-Pain: Russian Roulette - Road to Revolver

== See also ==
- List of record labels
