= Currensy discography =

Hip hop recording artist discography

Curren$y discography
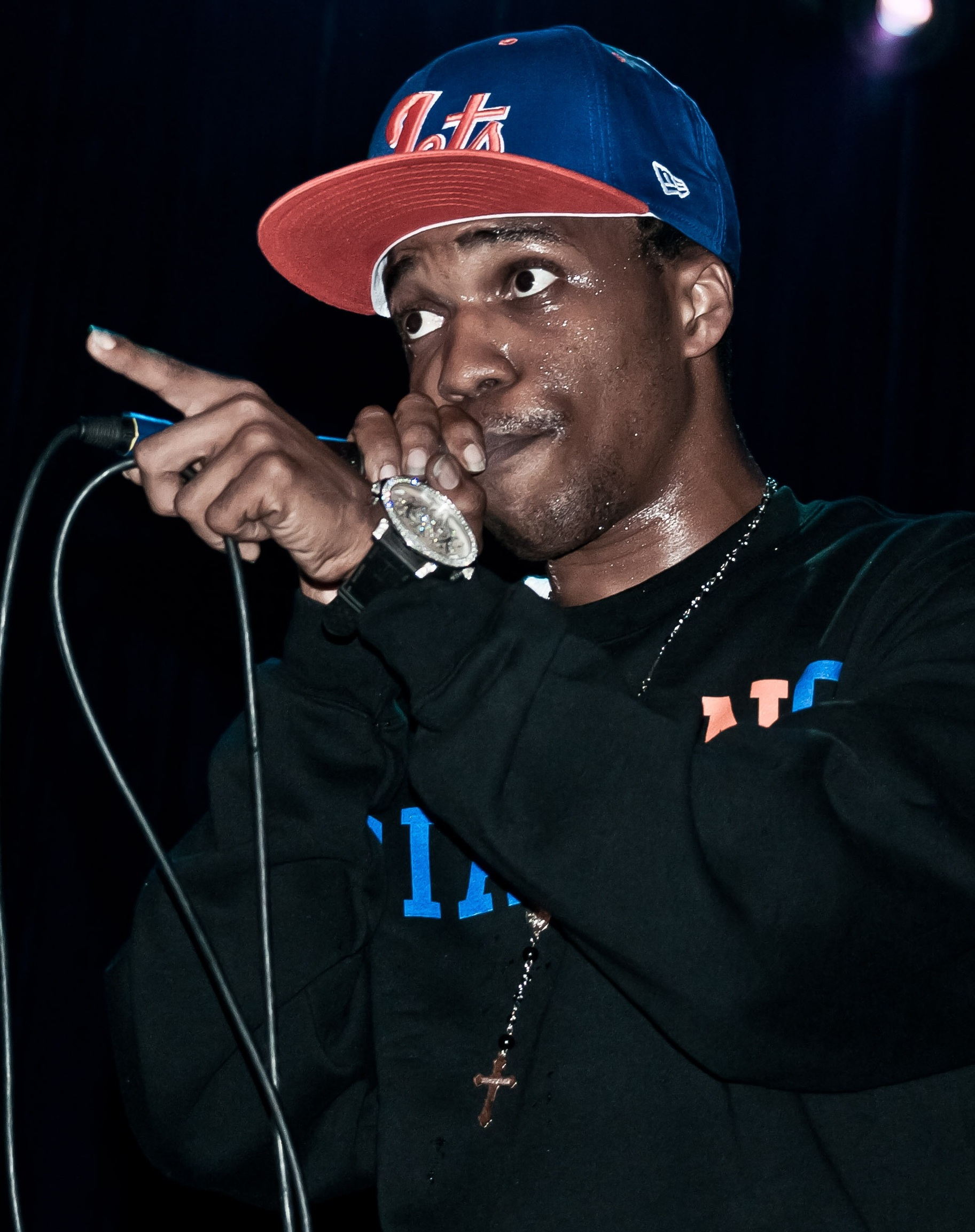
- Studio albums: 12
- Singles: 22
- Music videos: 63
- Mixtapes: 45
- Collaborative albums: 24
- Extended Plays: 35

This is the discography of American rapper Currensy.

== Albums ==
=== Studio albums ===
List of studio albums, with selected chart positions
Title	Album details	Peak chart positions				
Title	Album details	US	US R&B	US Rap	US Digital	US Taste
This Ain't No Mixtape	Released: April 21, 2009; Label: Amalgam Digital; Formats: CD, download	—	—	—	—	—
Jet Files	Released: October 6, 2009; Label: Amalgam Digital; Formats: CD, download	—	—	—	—	—
Pilot Talk	Released: July 17, 2010; Label: DD172; Formats: CD, download	39	9	6	10	16
Pilot Talk II	Released: November 22, 2010; Label: DD172; Formats: CD, download	95	15	9	16	18
Weekend at Burnie's	Released: June 28, 2011; Label: Jet Life, Warner Bros.; Format: CD, LP, download	22	6	4	16	16
The Stoned Immaculate	Released: June 5, 2012; Label: Jet Life, Warner Bros.; Format: CD, LP, download	8	2	2	5	12
Pilot Talk III	Released: April 4, 2015; Label: Jet Life; Format: download	80	19	16	13	15
Canal Street Confidential	Released: December 4, 2015; Label: Jet Life, Atlantic; Format: CD, download	30	6	4	13	—
Back at Burnie's	Released: December 20, 2019; Label: Jet Life; Format: CD, download	—	—	—	—	—
Collection Agency	Released: February 26, 2021; Label: Jet Life; Format: download	—	—	—	—	—
Still Stoned on Ocean	Released: October 8, 2021; Label: Jet Life; Format: download	—	—	—	—	—
Pilot Talk IV	Released: December 24, 2021; Label: Jet Life; Format: download	—	—	—	—	—
"—" denotes a recording that did not chart or was not released in that territory.

=== Collaborative albums ===
List of collaborative albums, with year released
Title	Album details
Covert Coup (with The Alchemist)	Released: April 20, 2011; Label: Jet Life, ALC; Format: Download
Jet World Order (with Jet Life)	Released: November 29, 2011; Label: Jets International, iHipHop Distribution; Format: Download
Muscle Car Chronicles (with Sean O'Connell)	Released: February 14, 2012; Label: DD172; Format: Download
Jet World Order 2 (with Jet Life)	Released: November 20, 2012; Label: Jets International, iHipHop Distribution; Format: Download
Fetti (with Freddie Gibbs and The Alchemist)	Released: October 31, 2018; Label: ESGN, Jet Life, ALC; Format: Download
2009 (with Wiz Khalifa)	Released: February 8, 2019; Label: Jet Life, Atlantic; Format: Download
Gran Turismo (with Statik Selektah)	Released: May 17, 2019; Label: Jet Life, Showoff, EMPIRE; Format: Download
Pheno Grigio (with Berner)	Released: July 7, 2019; Label: Bern One Ent, Jet Life; Format: Download
Plan of Attack (with Trademark da Skydiver and Young Roddy)	Released: October 11, 2019; Label: Babygrande Records, Inc.; Format: Download
The Tonite Show with Curren$y (with DJ Fresh)	Released: January 31, 2020; Label: Fresh in the Flesh Music, RBC Records; Format: Download
Spring Clean (with Fuse)	Released: June 19, 2020; Label: Jet Life; Format: Download
The OutRunners (with Harry Fraud)	Released: July 24, 2020; Label: Jet Life, SRFSCHL; Format: Download, streaming
The Director's Cut (with Harry Fraud)	Released: September 18, 2020; Label: Jet Life, SRFSCHL; Format: Download, streaming
Welcome to Jet Life Recordings (with Jet Life)	Released: December 4, 2020; Label: Jet Life; Format: Download, streaming
Welcome to Jet Life Recordings 2 (with Jet Life)	Released: June 25, 2021; Label: Jet Life; Format: Download, streaming
Highest in Charge (with Trauma Tone)	Released: August 27, 2021; Label: Jet Life; Format: Download, streaming
Matching Rolexes (with Kino Beats)	Released: September 17, 2021; Label: Jet Life; Format: Download, streaming
Continuance (with The Alchemist)	Released: February 18, 2022; Label: Jet Life, ALC; Format: Download, streaming
Spring Clean 2 (with Fuse)	Released: June 10, 2022; Label: Jet Life; Format: Download, streaming
Season Opener (with Jet Life)	Released: September 8, 2023; Label: Jet Life; Format: Download, streaming
Radioactive (with MonstaBeatz)	Released: July 19, 2024; Label: Jet Life, Monstabeatz; Format: Download, streaming
The Tonite Show The Sequel (with DJ.Fresh)	Released: August 30, 2024; Label: Fresh in the Flesh, Jet Life, EMPIRE; Format: Download, streaming
The Encore (with DJ.Fresh)	Released: October 11, 2024; Label: Fresh in the Flesh, Jet Life, EMPIRE; Format: Download, streaming
Never Catch Us (with Harry Fraud)	Released: March 14, 2025; Label: Jet Life, SRFSCHL; Format: Download, streaming
Roofless Records for Drop Tops: Disc 1 (with Wiz Khalifa)	Released: April 2, 2026; Label: Taylor Gang Ent.; Format: Download, streaming
Off to the Races (with Harry Fraud)	Released: November 6, 2026; Label: Jet Life, SRFSCHL; Format: Download, streaming

=== Extended plays ===
List of extended plays, with selected chart positions
Title	Album details	Peak chart positions		
Title	Album details	US	US R&B	US Rap
Here...	Released: February 5, 2012; Label: Jet Life; Format: Download	—	—	—
#The1st28 (with Styles P)	Released: February 28, 2012; Label: Jet Life, D-Block Records; Format: Download	—	—	—
Cigarette Boats (with Harry Fraud)	Released: July 10, 2012; Label: Jet Life; Format: Download	—	—	—
Live in Concert (with Wiz Khalifa)	Released: April 20, 2013 (US); Label: Jet Life, Rostrum; Format: Download	30	8	7
Saturday Night Car Tunes	Released: August 30, 2014; Label: Jet Life; Format: Download	—	—	—
More Saturday Night Car Tunes	Released: October 4, 2014; Label: Jet Life; Format: Download	—	—	—
Even More Saturday Night Car Tunes	Released: April 20, 2015 (US); Label: Jet Life, Atlantic; Format: Download	58	8	8
Cathedral (with Chase N. Cashe)	Released: August 5, 2015; Label: Jet Life; Format: Download	—	—	—
Bourbon Street Secrets (with Purps)	Released: April 20, 2016; Label: Jet Life; Format: Download	—	—	—
The Legend of Harvard Blue	Released: May 30, 2016; Label: Jet Life; Format: Download	—	—	—
Stoned on Ocean	Released: June 27, 2016; Label: Jet Life; Format: Download	—	—	—
Revolver (with Sledgren)	Released: August 24, 2016; Label: Jet Life; Format: Download	—	—	—
The Jetlanta EP (with Cornerboy P and T.Y.)	Released: January 13, 2017; Label: Jet Life; Format: Download	—	—	—
The Motivational Speech EP (with Lex Luger)	Released: September 30, 2017; Label: Jet Life; Format: Download	—	—	—
Parking Lot Music	Released: March 28, 2018; Label: Jet Life; Format: Download	—	—	—
Air Freshna	Released: April 20, 2018; Label: Jet Life; Format: Download	—	—	—
The Marina (with Harry Fraud)	Released: May 30, 2018; Label: Jet Life; Format: Download	—	—	—
Umbrella Symphony (with LNDN DRGS and Jay Worthy)	Released: May 10, 2019 (US); Label: GDF, Jet Life, Empire; Format: Download	—	—	—
Hot August Nights	Released: August 16, 2019; Label: Jet Life; Format: Download	—	—	—
Hot August Nights Forever	Released: November 28, 2019; Label: Jet Life; Format: Download	—	—	—
Prestige Worldwide (with Smoke DZA)	Released: November 29, 2019 (US); Label: RFC Music Group, Jet Life, Cinematic Music Group; Format: Download	—	—	—
3 Piece Set	Released: February 21, 2020; Label: Jet Life; Format: Download	—	—	—
Smokin' Potnas (with Fendi P)	Released: March 13, 2020 (US); Label: Jet Life; Format: Download	—	—	—
The Green Tape (with Cardo)	Released: April 10, 2020 (US); Label: Jet Life; Format: Download	—	—	—
Bonus Footage (with Harry Fraud)	Released: November 27, 2020 (US); Label: Jet Life, SRFSCHL; Format: Download	—	—	—
Financial District	Released: April 20, 2021 (US); Label: Jet Life; Format: NFT	—	—	—
Regatta (with Harry Fraud)	Released: October 29, 2021 (US); Label: Jet Life, SRFSCHL; Format: Download	—	—	—
Land Air Sea (with Cash Fargo)	Released: November 29, 2021 (US); Label: Jet Life; Format: Download	—	—	—
Land Air Sea (Chopped Not Slopped) (with Cash Fargo)	Released: January 14, 2022 (US); Label: Jet Life; Format: Download	—	—	—
The 8 Ball Jacket	Released: September 17, 2022 (US); Label: Jet Life; Format: Download	—	—	—
8 Ball Jacket 2	Released: October 18, 2022 (US); Label: Jet Life; Format: Download	—	—	—
For Motivational Use Only, Vol. 1 (with Jermaine Dupri)	Released: April 4, 2023 (US); Label: Jet Life, So So Def; Format: Download	—	—	—
VICES (with Harry Fraud)	Released: June 30, 2023 (US); Label: SRFSCHL, Jet Life; Format: Digital download	—	—	—
Highway 600 (with Trauma Tone)	Released: December 15, 2023 (US); Label: Which Way Is Up, Jet Life; Format: Digital download	—	—	—
9/15	Released: September 15, 2025 (US); Label: Jet Life; Format: Digital download	—	—	—
10/15	Released: October 15, 2025 (US); Label: Jet Life; Format: Digital download	—	—	—
Everywhere You Look	Released: January 23, 2026 (US); Label: Jet Life; Format: Digital download	—	—	—
Spiral Staircases (with Larry June and the Alchemist)	Released: February 20, 2026 (US); Label: The Freeminded, Jet Life, ALC, Empire; Format: Digital download	—	—	—
Roofless Records for Drop Tops: Disc 2 (with Wiz Khalifa and Harry Fraud)	Released: April 28, 2026 (US); Label: Jet Life, Taylor Gang, SRFSCHL; Format: Digital download	—	—	—
"—" denotes a recording that did not chart or was not released in that territory.

=== Mixtapes ===
List of mixtapes, with year released
Title	Album details
Sports Center, Vol. 1	Released: 2004; Label: No Limit Records; Format: Download
Welcome Back	Released: 2005; Label: Fly Society; Format: Download
Young Money: The Mixtape, Vol. 1 (Disc 1) (with Lil Wayne, Mack Maine, and Boo)	Released: 2005; Label: Young Money; Format: Download
Young Money: The Mixtape, Vol. 1 (Disc 2) (with Lil Wayne, Mack Maine, and Boo)	Released: 2005; Label: Young Money; Format: Download
Life at 30,000 Feet	Released: February 19, 2007; Label: Cash Money Records, Fly Society, No Limit Records; Format: Download
Independence Day	Released: February 1, 2008; Label: Fly Society; Format: Download
Higher than 30,000 Feet	Released: April 1, 2008; Label: Fly Society; Format: Download
Welcome to the Winner's Circle	Released: May 3, 2008; Label: Fly Society; Format: Download
Fear and Loathing in New Orleans	Released: June 11, 2008; Label: Fly Society; Format: Download
Super Tecmo Bowl	Released: July 15, 2008; Label: Fly Society; Format: Download
Fast Times at Ridgemont Fly	Released: August 15, 2008; Label: Fly Society; Format: Download
Fin...	Released: September 22, 2008; Label: Fly Society; Format: Download
Kicks, Video Games, Movies & Chicks	Released: February 9, 2009; Label: Fly Society; Format: Download
How Fly (with Wiz Khalifa)	Released: August 9, 2009; Label: Jets International, Taylor Gang, Rostrum; Format: Download
Smokee Robinson (Hosted by DJ Don Cannon)	Released: February 7, 2010; Label: Jets International; Format: Download
Return to the Winner's Circle	Released: January 1, 2011; Label: Jets International; Format: Download
Jet Life to the Next Life (with Trademark da Skydiver and Young Roddy)	Released: March 25, 2011; Label: Jets International; Format: Download
Verde Terrace (Hosted by DJ Drama)	Released: August 23, 2011; Label: Jet Life; Format: Download
Priest Andretti	Released: October 31, 2012; Label: Jet Life; Format: Download
3 Piece Set: A Closed Session (with Young Roddy)	Released: December 24, 2012; Label: Jet Life; Format: Download
New Jet City	Released: February 3, 2013; Label: Jet Life; Format: Download
Red Eye (with Jet Life)	Released: August 2, 2013; Label: Jet Life; Format: Download
Bales (with Young Roddy)	Released: September 6, 2013; Label: Jet Life; Format: Download
The Stage (with Smoke DZA and Harry Fraud)	Released: October 30, 2013; Label: SRFSCHL, LLC; Format: Download
The Drive in Theatre	Released: February 14, 2014; Label: Jet Life; Format: Download
Organized Crime (with Jet Life)	Released: September 13, 2014; Label: Jet Life; Format: Download
Audio D (with Jet Life)	Released: September 29, 2014; Label: Jet Life; Format: Download
World Wide Hustlers (with Jet Life)	Released: October 12, 2014; Label: Jet Life; Format: Download
The Owners Manual	Released: January 19, 2016; Label: Jet Life; Format: Download
The Carrollton Heist (with The Alchemist)	Released: February 14, 2016; Label: Jet Life, ALC; Format: Download
Weed & Instrumentals	Released: March 25, 2016; Label: Jet Life; Format: Download
Weed & Instrumentals 2	Released: July 22, 2016; Label: Jet Life; Format: Download
Andretti 9/30	Released: September 30, 2016; Label: Jet Life; Format: Download
Andretti 10/30	Released: October 30, 2016; Label: Jet Life; Format: Download
Andretti 11/30	Released: November 30, 2016; Label: Jet Life; Format: Download
Andretti 12/30	Released: December 30, 2016; Label: Jet Life; Format: Download
Jet Life All-Stars (with Jet Life)	Released: February 19, 2017; Label: Jet Life; Format: Download
The Fo20 Massacre	Released: April 20, 2017; Label: Jet Life; Format: Download
The Champagne Files	Released: July 20, 2017; Label: Jet Life; Format: Download
The Spring Collection	Released: February 23, 2018; Label: Jet Life; Format: Download
Fire in the Clouds	Released: August 30, 2018; Label: Jet Life; Format: Download
Weed & Instrumentals 3	Released: December 24, 2018; Label: Jet Life; Format: Download
The Drive in Theatre, Part 2	Released: November 25, 2022; Label: Jet Life; Format: Download
Andretti 7/30	Released: July 30, 2025; Label: Jet Life; Format: Download
Andretti 8/30	Released: August 30, 2025; Label: Jet Life; Format: Download

== Singles ==
=== As lead artist ===
List of singles, with selected chart positions, showing year released and album name
Title	Year	Peak chart positions			Album
Title	Year	US	US R&B	US Rap	Album
"Where da Cash At" (featuring Lil Wayne and Remy Ma)	2006	—	73	—	Non-album single
"My House" (featuring Lil Wayne)	2007	—	—	—	Non-album single
"Elevator Musik"	2009	—	—	—	This Ain't No Mixtape
"16 Switches"	2009	—	—	—	This Ain't No Mixtape
"Living The Life"	2009	—	—	—	Jet Files
"King Kong"	2010	—	—	—	Pilot Talk
"Roasted"	2010	—	—	—	Pilot Talk
"Michael Knight"	2010	—	—	—	Pilot Talk II
"Ventilation" (with The Alchemist)	2011	—	—	—	Covert Coup
"Full Metal" (with The Alchemist)	2011	—	—	—	Covert Coup
"Scottie Pippen" (with The Alchemist, featuring Freddie Gibbs)	2011	—	—	—	Covert Coup
"#JetsGo"	2011	—	—	—	Weekend at Burnie's
"1st Place" (with Jet Life)	2011	—	—	—	Jet World Order
"What It Look Like" (featuring Wale)	2012	—	—	—	The Stoned Immaculate
"Jet Life" (featuring Big K.R.I.T. and Wiz Khalifa)	2012	—	76	—	The Stoned Immaculate
"No Sleep" (with Jet Life)	2012	—	—	—	Jet World Order 2
"The Godfather 4" (featuring Action Bronson)	2014	—	—	—	The Drive In Theatre
"Briefcase"	2015	—	—	—	Pilot Talk III
"Cargo Planes"	2015	—	—	—	Pilot Talk III
"Alert" (featuring Styles P)	2015	—	—	—	Pilot Talk III
"Audio Dope 5"	2015	—	—	—	Pilot Talk III
"Bottom of the Bottle" (featuring August Alsina and Lil Wayne)	2015	97	29	18	Canal Street Confidential
"—" denotes a recording that did not chart or was not released in that territory.

=== As featured artist ===
List of singles as featured artist, showing year released and album name
Title	Year	Album
"Living the Life" (Young Riot featuring Max B and Curren$y)	2010	Jet Files
"Push Thru" (Talib Kweli featuring Curren$y and Kendrick Lamar)	2012	Prisoner of Conscious
"Legends in the Making (Ashtray, Pt. 2)" (Smoke DZA featuring Wiz Khalifa and Curren$y)	2013	Dream.ZONE.Achieve
"Friday" (Polyester the Saint featuring Curren$y)	2016	Non-album single
"I'm On 3.0" (Trae tha Truth featuring T.I., Dave East, Tee Grizzley, Royce da 5'9", Curren$y, DRAM, Snoop Dogg, Fabolous, Rick Ross, Chamillionaire, G-Eazy, Styles P, E-40, Mark Morrison and Gary Clark, Jr.)	2017	Tha Truth, Pt. 3

== Other charted songs ==
List of songs, with selected chart positions, showing year released and album name
Title	Year	Peak chart positions	Album
Title	Year	US Bubbling Under R&B/Hip-Hop	Album
"Don't Shoot" (The Game featuring Rick Ross, 2 Chainz, Diddy, Fabolous, Wale, DJ Khaled, Swizz Beatz, Yo Gotti, Curren$y, Problem, King Pharoah, and TGT)	2014	3	Non-album single

== Guest appearances ==
List of non-single guest appearances, with other performing artists, showing year released and album name
Title	Year	Other artist(s)	Album
"Motha Fuck You"	2002	Soulja Slim, Tre Nitty, 12 A'KLOK	Years Later
"Shovlin' Snow"	2005	Birdman, Mack Maine, Lil Wayne	Fast Money
"Grown Man"	2005	Lil Wayne	Tha Carter II
"Poppin Them Bottles"	2006	Lil Wayne, Mack Maine	Dedication 2
"Ridin wit the AK"	2006	Lil Wayne, Mack Maine	Dedication 2
"President"	2007	Lil Wayne	Da Drought 3
"Five Bucks (5 on It)"	2010	Big Sean, King Chip	Finally Famous Vol. 3: Big
"Fly Jets Over Boston"	2010	Sammy Adams	Boston's Boy
"No Wheaties"	2010	Big K.R.I.T., Smoke DZA	K.R.I.T. Wuz Here
"So High"	2010	French Montana	Mac & Cheese 2
"Glass House"	2010	Wiz Khalifa, Big K.R.I.T.	Kush & Orange Juice
"Super High" (Sativa Remix)	2010	Rick Ross, Ne-Yo, Wiz Khalifa	—N/a
"Scaling the Building"	2010	Ski Beatz, Wiz Khalifa	24 Hour Karate School
"Huey Newton"	2010	Wiz Khalifa	—N/a
"Rise"	2011	Pill, Teedra Moses, Cyhi the Prynce	Self Made Vol. 1
"Stand Tall"	2011	N.O.R.E., Ace Hood	The N.O.R.E.aster EP
"Can't Stop"	2011	Slim Thug, Dre Day	Houston: The Mixtape
"Rooftops"	2011	Wiz Khalifa	Rolling Papers
"Pledge"	2011	Kidz in the Hall, Mikkey Halsted	Occasion
"OG"	2011	Snoop Dogg, Wiz Khalifa	Mac & Devin Go to High School
"Hammers & Vogues"	2012	Stalley	Savage Journey To The American Dream
"Grooveline Pt. 1"	2012	ScHoolboy Q, Dom Kennedy	Habits & Contradictions
"Through the Struggle"	2012	Styles P, Raheem Devaughn	The Diamond Life Project
"Wonderful"	2012	Fiend	Lil Ghetto Boy
"Tell a Friend"	2012	Freddie Gibbs	Baby Face Killa
"Clouds"	2012	DJ Drama, Rick Ross, Miguel, Pusha T	Quality Street Music
"Point of View"	2012	Berner	Urban Farmer
"White House Watch"	2012	Corner Boy P	Money Neva Sleep 2
"Summertime Ish"	2012	Big Hud, CyHi the Prynce	The Long Way Home
"It Was a Good Year"	2012	French Montana, Mac Miller	Mac & Cheese 3
"Hundreds"	2012	Big Kuntry King	Dope & Champagne
"Roll Up Right Now"	2013	Rockie Fresh	Electric Highway
"She Lookin'"	2013	Mack Maine	Freestyle 102: No Pens or Pads
"Dude"	2013	Asher Roth	RetroHash
"Life"	2013	Young Roddy	Good Sense 2
"1997"	2013	Corner Boy P	RNS
"Tonight"	2013	Lil Snupe	R.N.I.C.
"Let Me Hit That"	2013	August Alsina	The Product 2
"Pardon Me"	2013	Vado, Smoke DZA	Slime Flu 4
"HighLife"	2013	MellowHigh, Smoke DZA	MellowHigh
"Same Shit"	2015	Joey Fatts	Ill Street Blues
"In the Sun"	2015	French Montana	Casino Life 2: Brown Bag Legend
"Chain Smokin'"	2015	Gunplay, Stalley	Living Legend
"Criminal Activities"	2016	Corner Boy P, Tiny C-Style	Sixteen
"Creme Brulee"	2016	Corner Boy P	Sixteen
"Slept to Death"	2017	Statik Selektah, Cousin Stizz	8
"Top Drop"	2017	Scotty ATL	Smokin' on My Own Strain, Vol. 1
"On Me"	2017	Zaytoven, Young Dolph	Zaytoven Presents: Trapping Made It Happen
"Badu"	2018	Cozz	Effected
"My Definition"	2018	Gunplay, Masspike Miles	Active
"Mr. Williams / Where Is the Love"	2018	Wiz Khalifa, THEMXXNLIGHT	Rolling Papers 2
"Ever Do IT"	2018	Berner, Casey Veggies, Green R Fieldz, Cozmo	Rico
"I Made Sure"	2019	Dizzy Wright, Berner	Nobody Cares, Work Harder
"Real As You Think"	2019	Wiz Khalifa, Problem	Fly Times, Vol.1: The Good Fly Young
"4/20"	2019	Jim Jones, Wiz Khalifa	El Capo
"Mind of a Million"	2019	J. Stone	The Definition of Loyalty
"Chandelier"	2019	Shoreline Mafia	Party Pack, Vol. 2
"Live It Up"	2020	The Jacka, Berner	Murder Weapon
"In the Sun, Pt. 2"	2020	French Montana	CB5
"Fake Flowers"	2021	The Alchemist & Boldy James, Freddie Gibbs	Bo Jackson
"Red Fox Restaurant"	2021	Dave East	HOFFA
"Clouds"	2022	Logic, Langston Bristol	Vinyl Days
"Tony Fontana III"	2023	Hit-Boy	Surf or Drown
"Beyond Spiritual"	2023	Flying Lotus & Smoke DZA, Big K.R.I.T., Wiz Khalifa	Flying Objects
"Barragan Lighting"	2023	The Alchemist & Larry June, Joey Badass	The Great Escape
"Spaceship Views"	2023	Killer Mike, 2 Chainz, Kaash Paige	Michael
"Paint Different"	2023	The Alchemist	Flying High, Part II
"Juice in the Hood"	2024	Stalley	Peerless

== Music videos ==
List of music videos, with directors, showing year released
Title	Year	Director(s)
"Where da Cash At" (featuring Lil Wayne and Remy Ma)	2006	—N/a
"Elevator Musik"	2009	Brandan Odums
"King Kong"	2010	Jonah Schwartz
"Breakfast"	2010	Jonah Schwartz
"Life Under the Scope"	2010	Michael Sterling
"Audio Dope II"	2010	—N/a
"Address"	2010	Creative Control
"Twistin Stank"	2010	—N/a
"Hold On"	2010	Jonah Schwartz
"Roasted"	2010	Creative Control
"Michael Knight"	2010	Creative Control
"#JetsGo"	2011	Jonah Schwartz
"Still"	2011	David Parks
"Ways To Kill Em"	2011	McCain Merren
"She Don't Want a Man"	2011	Phil the God
"This Is the Life"	2011	Phil the God
"What It Look Like" (featuring Wale)	2012	G Visuals
"Fast Cars Faster Women" (featuring Daz Dillinger)	2012	CJ Wallis
"Capitol" (featuring 2 Chainz)	2012	CJ Wallis
"Showroom"	2012	CJ Wallis
"Jet Life" (featuring Big K.R.I.T. and Wiz Khalifa)	2012	Alex Nazari
"Chandelier"	2012	Brian Petchers
"Living for the City"	2013	CJ Wallis
"Mary"	2013	CJ Wallis
"These Bitches" (featuring French Montana)	2013	CJ Wallis
"Bitch Get Up" (featuring Juvenile)	2013	Cody Coyote
"Kingpin"	2013	CJ Wallis
"New Jet City"	2013	CJ Wallis
"Toast" (featuring Wiz Khalifa)	2013	CJ Wallis
"AD4" (featuring Young Roddy)	2013	CJ Wallis
"Sunroof" (featuring Cornerboy P)	2013	John Colombo
"Briefcase"	2015	Understream Motion Pictures
"Cargo Planes"	2015	Understream Motion Pictures
"Audio Dope 5"	2015	Understream Motion Pictures
"Sidewalk Show"	2015	Fortyfps Film Productions
"Rhymes Like Weight"	2015	Fortyfps Film Productions
"Cars"	2015	Fortyfps Film Productions
"Bottom Of The Bottle" (featuring August Alsina and Lil Wayne)	2015	Christopher Schafer
"Jason (Freestyle)"	2015	Fortyfps Film Productions
"Lowriders At The Nightshow"	2015	Fortyfps Film Productions
"Boulders"	2015	Fortyfps Film Productions
"Superstar" (featuring Ty Dolla Sign)	2015	Fortyfps Film Productions
"International Set"	2015	Erikson Corniel
"All Wit My Hands"	2015	Fortyfps Film Productions
"The Mack Book"	2016	Fortyfps Film Productions
"Smoking In The Rain"	2016	Understream Motion Pictures
"Grand Theft Auto"	2016	Freewater
"Rhymes Like Weight"	2016	Fortyfps Film Productions
"Vibrations"	2016	Understream Motion Pictures
"Enter" x "Kilo Jam"	2016	#TooDopeBoyz
"Supply & Demand"	2016	#TooDopeBoyz
"Game For Sale"	2016	Freewater
"Pirates"	2016	#TooDopeBoyz
"Canal Street Boys"	2016	Dexstr8dope
"Dope Boys" (featuring Rick Ross)	2016	Fortyfps Film Productions
"Blades Of Steel"	2016	Dexstr8dope
"Ownership"	2016	Understream Motion Pictures
"Incarcerated Scarfaces"	2016	—N/a
"Anybody"	2016	DopeMediaAriel & Dexstr8dope
"Real Family"	2016	Dexstr8dope
"What It Mean" (with Cornerboy P and T.Y.)	2017	Dexstr8dope
"Been Real"	2017	Dexstr8dope
"The Life" (with Wiz Khalifa)	2019	CBFOUR.CO
