= Kasim Keto =

American music producer

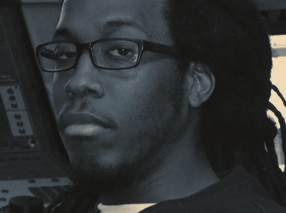
- Kasim Keto in a recording studio.

Background information
- Origin: New York City
- Genres: Music, electronic
- Occupation: Music producer
- Instrument(s): D.A.W., piano
- Years active: 2013–present
- Labels: Babygrande Records
- Website: KasimKeto.com

Kasim Keto is an American music producer. He has collaborated with artists such as Roc Marciano, and in 2013 signed to Babygrande Records, releasing several singles. His debut album with Babygrande, Long Cars Rides, was released in December 2013. Clash Music gave it a score of 8/10, with reviewer Joe Rivers writing, "This largely instrumental record... evokes the golden age of hip-hop...however, nightmarish and unsettling sounds and samples ensure 'Long Car Rides' always remains the right side of Daisy Age nostalgia." In 2014, Keto had three collaborative singles featured in the film Kid Cannabis.

== Early life ==
Kasim Keto was born in Brooklyn, New York. His parents, both immigrants from Jamaica, separated when he was small, and at about the age of six, he spent time with his mother in Alabama and Florida, before returning to live in the New York City area with his father. He predominantly grew up in Queens, New York, specifically the multi-cultural neighborhood of South Jamaica.

He has credited his father, who is from a West Indian background, with playing a wide variety of music while Keto was growing up. This exposed Keto to genres as diverse as reggae, rock, and disco. Keto wrote his first songs at the age of eight. He has recalled that around that time, "I can remember sitting in my living room and listening to music and the feeling it gave me was incredible… All I knew is that I wanted to spend the rest of my life trying to give people that feeling. It was the only thing that made me feel unique and like I had an ability that exceed my own life."

As a student, he was "always playing with music," tinkering with the piano and learning the basics of music production. learning how to use professional audio gear at various project studios.

== Music career ==
=== Early production ===
Early in his career, he released a number of official remixes. On July 5, 2013, he self-released the single "The Most Beautiful & Loving Thing In The World," a "gospel 'mix'" inspired by his son.

In August 2013, it was announced that he had signed to New York City-based Babygrande Records, with his debut solo album in the works. On November 4, 2013, he released "Long Way," his first single on Babygrande. This was followed on December 3 by "Bust the Work Down," a collaborative single featuring rapper and producer Roc Marciano that was released on A3C and iH2D. It was featured on the compilation album A3C Volume 3.

=== 2013-14: Long Car Rides, singles ===
Keto's debut album Long Car Rides had originally been planned as a four-track EP, but was extended after his signing to Babygrande. He decided on the title while the project was still an EP, stating "the studio where I was recording was a bit of a drive away and when you’re driving it gives you time to just think... I wanted to create music that reflected this state of thoughtfulness."

Long Cars Rides was released on December 30, 2013, with 17 instrumental tracks that combine "hip hop, jazz, and electronic music." The album's track "That's Why He Made" was "inspired by a friend who passed away tragically and her very turbulent love life," stated Keto. "I dedicated Long Car Rides partially in her memory. It incorporated hip hop, soul, R&B, jazz, rock and a little bit of electronica."

Clash Music gave it a score of 8/10, with reviewer Joe Rivers writing, "This largely instrumental record... perfectly evokes the golden age of hip-hop with its prodigious use of 'old-skool' beats. However, nightmarish and unsettling sounds and samples ensure ‘Long Car Rides’ always remains the right side of Daisy Age nostalgia." It earned B+ from WeTheOpionated.com

In 2014, Keto's music was featured in the film Kid Cannabis. He is working on his sophomore album with Babygrande.

=== 2015: Endless Night ===
2015: Kasim was preparing the release of his sophomore album "Endless Night" for a November 6 release date. The first single from the album was "4sale" and was released in conjunction with a music video. Kasim was also working with The Collective As Themselves on their debut material.

== Personal life ==
As of 2013, he is based in New York with his family.

== Discography ==
=== Albums ===
Albums by Kasim Keto
Year	Album title	Release details
2013	Long Car Rides	Released: December 30, 2013; Label: Babygrande Records; Format: CD, digital, vinyl
2016	Endless Night	Released: November 6, 2015; Label: Babygrande Records; Format: digital
2023	Mauzo	Released 2023

=== Singles ===
Incomplete list of songs by Kasim Keto
Year	Title	Album	Label, date
2013	"The Most Beautiful and Loving Nice Thing In The World"	—	Self-released July 5, 2013
2013	"Long Way"	—	Babygrande November 4, 2013
2013	"Bust the Work Down" (ft. Roc Marciano)	A3C Volume 3	A3C3/iHipHop December 3, 2013
2014	"Rat Race"	—	Babygrande February 17, 2014
2023	"Carry On"		Self-Released

=== Remixes ===
- 2013: "Rose Clique" by Nipsey Hussle

== See also ==
- Babygrande Records
