= Elevator music (disambiguation) =

Elevator music is background music one is not expected to listen to, but is played in shops, elevators, over the phone while on hold, etc.

Elevator music may also refer to:

- "Elevator Music", a track on Beck's 2006 alternative rock album The Information
- "Elevator Musik", a single from Currensy's 2009 hip hop album This Ain't No Mixtape
- Elevator Musiq, 2008 R&B album by Nesian Mystik
