= Bourbon Street Secrets =

Mixtape by Curren$y & Purps
- Released: April 20, 2016
- Recorded: 2016
- Genre: Hip hop
- Length: 22:49
- Label: Jet Life Recordings
- Producer: Purps

Curren$y chronology
Revolver (2016)	Bourbon Street Secrets (2016)	The Legend Of Harvard Blue (2016)

Bourbon Street Secrets is a mixtape by American rapper Curren$y and producer Purps. It was released for online download on April 20, 2016.

== Track listing ==
- All tracks are produced by Purps.

No.	Title	Length
1.	"Paper"	3:10
2.	"Cement 4's"	3:51
3.	"Anticipation"	4:38
4.	"Dope Boys" (featuring Rick Ross)	4:10
5.	"Look at It"	3:34
6.	"Theme Music (GTA)"	3:26
Total length:		22:49
