= Jet World Order =

Studio album by Jet Life
- Released: November 29, 2011
- Recorded: 2011
- Genre: Hip hop
- Length: 46:28
- Labels: Jets; iHipHop
- Producers: Monsta Beatz; Cardo; City Sparks; Cookin' Soul; Nesby Phips; Show Off; Beat Butcha; JusinCredible; Trifeckta; Ski Beatz; 183rd; V. Don; Kenny Beats; B. Corder; Big K.R.I.T.; RMG (Roamer Muzik Group)

Jet Life chronology
| Jet World Order (2011) | Jet World Order 2 (2012) |

Singles from Jet World Order
- 1. "1st Place" Released: November 2, 2011

Jet World Order is the debut studio album by American hip hop collective Jet Life. It was released on November 29, 2011. The bonus track edition of the album includes a guest appearance from Big K.R.I.T. A bonus loud pack edition of the album was released on the same day and features guest appearances from Cory Gunz, Bun B, Dom Kennedy, Schoolboy Q, Kendrick Lamar, A$AP Rocky and Terri Walker.

== Singles ==
The first single from Jet World Order is "1st Place", produced by Show Off. It was released on November 2, 2011 to iTunes. It features labelmates Curren$y, Trademark Da Skydiver, Young Roddy and Mikey Rocks. The music video for the song was released on December 20.

== Critical response ==
Jet World Order scored a 6.7 from Pitchfork Media, a 3/5 from HipHopDX, and a 7/10 from AllHipHop.

== Commercial performance ==
The album debuted at #148 on the Billboard 200, selling 4,200 copies. It also debuted at #3, #17, and #26 on the Heatseekers Albums, Rap Albums, and Independent Albums charts, respectively.

== Track listing ==
Jet World Order
| No. | Title | Producer(s) | Length |
|---|---|---|---|
| 1. | "Excellent" (featuring Curren$y, Trademark Da Skydiver and Young Roddy) | Monsta Beatz | 4:11 |
| 2. | "The Business" (featuring Trademark Da Skydiver and Young Roddy) | City Sparks | 3:22 |
| 3. | "Paper Habits" (featuring Trademark Da Skydiver and Young Roddy) | Cookin' Soul | 3:13 |
| 4. | "Exhale" (featuring Curren$y, Trademark Da Skydiver and Young Roddy) | Monsta Beatz | 4:29 |
| 5. | "Lop-Sided" (featuring Trademark Da Skydiver, Young Roddy and Nesby Phips) | Nesby Phips | 3:48 |
| 6. | "1st Place" (featuring Curren$y, Trademark Da Skydiver, Young Roddy and Mikey Rocks) | Show Off | 5:40 |
| 7. | "The Set" (featuring Trademark Da Skydiver, Young Roddy and Smoke DZA) | Beat Butcha | 3:50 |
| 8. | "Nothing Less" (featuring Trademark Da Skydiver and Young Roddy) | Cookin' Soul | 2:25 |
| 9. | "Picture Perfect" (featuring Trademark Da Skydiver, Young Roddy, Fiend and Corner Boy P) | JusinCredible | 3:38 |
| 10. | "Blow Up" (featuring Trademark Da Skydiver and Young Roddy) | Monsta Beatz | 3:00 |
| 11. | "Money Piles" (featuring Trademark Da Skydiver, Young Roddy and Street Wiz) | Trifeckta; Exchange Student (co) | 4:22 |
| 12. | "Pilots" (featuring Trademark Da Skydiver and Young Roddy) | Cookin' Soul | 3:19 |
| 13. | "Outro" (featuring Trademark Da Skydiver and Young Roddy) | Monsta Beatz | 1:11 |

Bonus Jet Package Version
| No. | Title | Producer | Length |
|---|---|---|---|
| 14. | "Pre-Roasted" (featuring Trademark Da Skydiver and Curren$y) | Ski Beatz | 3:12 |
| 15. | "No Wheaties" (featuring Smoke DZA, Curren$y and Big K.R.I.T.) | Ski Beatz | 3:08 |
| 16. | "Ova 'N Out" (featuring Trademark Da Skydiver and Curren$y) | B. Corder | 3:38 |
| 17. | "Etc Etc" (featuring Smoke DZA, Curren$y and Big K.R.I.T.) | Ski Beatz | 4:39 |
| 18. | "We Go On" (featuring Trademark Da Skydiver and Curren$y) | Monsta Beatz | 2:49 |
| 19. | "Skyscrapers" (featuring Trademark Da Skydiver, Curren$y, Young Roddy and Dash) | B. Corder | 4:36 |
| 20. | "Personal Party" (featuring Smoke DZA and Curren$y) | V. Don; Beat Butcha (co) | 4:09 |

Bonus Loud Pack Version
| No. | Title | Producer | Length |
|---|---|---|---|
| 1. | "The Business" (featuring Trademark Da Skydiver and Young Roddy) | City Sparks | 3:22 |
| 2. | "Paper Habits" (featuring Trademark Da Skydiver and Young Roddy) | Cookin' Soul | 3:13 |
| 3. | "Lop-Sided" (featuring Trademark Da Skydiver, Young Roddy and Nesby Phips) | Nesby Phips | 3:48 |
| 4. | "The Set" (featuring Trademark Da Skydiver, Young Roddy and Smoke DZA) | Beat Butcha | 3:50 |
| 5. | "Nothing Less" (featuring Trademark Da Skydiver and Young Roddy) | Cookin' Soul | 2:25 |
| 6. | "Picture Perfect" (featuring Trademark Da Skydiver, Young Roddy, Fiend and Corner Boy P) | JusinCredible | 3:38 |
| 7. | "Blow Up" (featuring Trademark Da Skydiver and Young Roddy) | Monsta Beatz | 3:00 |
| 8. | "Money Piles" (featuring Trademark Da Skydiver, Young Roddy and Street Wiz) | Trifeckta; Exchange Student (co) | 4:22 |
| 9. | "Pilots" (featuring Trademark Da Skydiver and Young Roddy) | Cookin Soul | 3:19 |
| 10. | "Outro" (featuring Trademark Da Skydiver and Young Roddy) | Monsta Beatz | 1:11 |
| 11. | "Continental Breakfast" (featuring Smoke DZA and Den10) | Kenny Beats | 3:10 |
| 12. | "Elevated" (featuring Trademark Da Skydiver) | Beat Butcha | 2:51 |
| 13. | "High Life" (featuring Trademark Da Skydiver and Smoke DZA) | Ski Beatz | 3:57 |
| 14. | "Skyline" (featuring Trademark Da Skydiver, Young Roddy and Street Wiz) | Ski Beatz | 3:07 |
| 15. | "Pow Pow" (featuring Smoke DZA and Dom Kennedy) | Cardo | 2:28 |
| 16. | "The Secret" (featuring Smoke DZA and Big K.R.I.T.) | Ski Beatz | 2:57 |
| 17. | "Brain" (featuring Trademark Da Skydiver) | Show Off | 3:03 |
| 18. | "Ball Game" (featuring Smoke DZA and Kendrick Lamar) | 183rd; Kenny Beats (co) | 2:24 |
| 19. | "Up Here" (featuring Trademark Da Skydiver and Terri Walker) | Ski Beatz | 2:23 |
| 20. | "Crazy Glue" (featuring Smoke DZA, Cory Gunz and Big Sant) | | 3:16 |
| 21. | "On the Corner" (featuring Smoke DZA, Bun B and Big K.R.I.T.) | Big K.R.I.T. | 3:09 |
| 22. | "365" (featuring Trademark Da Skydiver, Smoke DZA and Terri Walker) | Ski Beatz | 4:11 |
| 23. | "4 Loko" (featuring Smoke DZA and A$AP Rocky) | 183rd | 3:19 |
| 24. | "Oxygen" (featuring Trademark Da Skydiver) | RMG (Roamer Muzik Group) | 3:26 |
| 25. | "Overhigh" (featuring Smoke DZA, Trademark Da Skydiver and Schoolboy Q) | V. Don; Beat Butcha (co) | 4:17 |

== Samples ==
- "The Business" contains a sample of "Completeness" by Jean Carne
- "1st Place" contains a sample of "I Am Too Waiting" by Syreeta
- "Lop Sided" contains a sample of "Time Is Passing" by Sun
- "Money Piles" contains a sample of "You Are What I'm All About" by The New Birth
- "Paper Habits" contains a sample of "Liquid Sunshine" by John Cameron
