= Live in Concert (EP) =

EP by Wiz Khalifa and Curren$y
- Released: April 20, 2013
- Recorded: 2012
- Genre: Hip hop
- Length: 24:08
- Labels: Jet Life; Rostrum

Wiz Khalifa chronology
O.N.I.F.C. (2012)	Live in Concert (2013)	Blacc Hollywood (2014)

Curren$y chronology
The Stoned Immaculate (2012)	Live in Concert (2013)	Pilot Talk III (2015)

Live in Concert is a collaborative EP by American rappers Wiz Khalifa and Curren$y. The EP was released on April 20, 2013, by Jet Life Recordings and Rostrum Records, and consists of the two rapping over songs from Bobbi Humphrey's Fancy Dancer album. The EP was originally planned to be released as a free mixtape in August 2012, but was released to retail as a way to avoid sample clearance issues.

== Background ==
In May 2012, Currensy announced that he had finished a joint mixtape with Wiz Khalifa, saying: "It’s done, but we not calling it out. You’re not going to get a How Fly 2, that’s corny, You’ll hear a collection of music from me and the homie when it’s necessary, but it’s done. We just chilling. I’m still listening to dude’s verses and shit still. We just chilling. We’ll put it out in a minute." He also explained the collaborative process between him and Wiz Khalifa working on the EP, saying: "We like what we doing. It’s just about music. We like what we do, If I’ma be in the studio anyway, he gonna be in the studio wherever he at, we fuckin’ genuinely will fuckin’ kick it. So we might as well fuckin’ kick it in the studio. But if we in the studio, we might as well make songs. We gonna hang out and smoke, smoke in the studio. If you in the studio, you might as well record. So we just kick it and turn it into money, so it's just a good deal." The EP was originally scheduled to be released as a mixtape on August 9, 2012, the 3 year anniversary of their 2009 mixtape How Fly. On August 9, 2012, the day of the planned release, Currensy announced they would have to delay the release of the EP to allow more time to clear samples, saying:

"We wouldn't feel comfortable droppin #LiveInConcert until we get the samples cleared. With how these suits keep poppin up.. Mixtapes ain’t safe, Lots of law suits being handed out to folks for makin free mixtape jams..Wiz,Mac,myself even..We gotta play this one smart..We got it tho. So don’t trip it’ll be out soons the legal beagles handle it…. Crazy how the game gets huh? I never imagined a time like this…. came up off mixtapes in 08 not financially but they put me on so2speak..Sucks that this may be a lane made unavailable to the next mcs.. But when one door closes, another one opens….We will do the due diligence and have it cleared in its entirety …When u hear it you’ll see what we built…. And it will last forever."

In November 2012, Currensy gave an update on the EP, saying: "We're fighting so hard for the Live in Concert [project], We're trying got hurry up and pay them for clearances and put it out, 'cus that shit was done when my leg was broken. It's like, we got so much shit done, I'm going through songs on the hard drive to complete New Jet City. That's gonna be the next project. I'm debating - I might put it out for free. I was gonna put it out retail, but I'm figuring since everything's going with Live in Concert and there's been so many hold-ups…[I might] give them a record…[it'll drop] probably in the next couple of weeks. I just gotta think of a cool date, that's all." On January 9, 2013, Currensy hinted on his Twitter account that Live In Concert may have to be released to retail, saying: "Honestly with the way the legal beagles r Finna tax us.... #liveinconcert is gonna have to be a retail project... Y'all still down??". On April 17, 2013, Wiz Khalifa and Currensy announced after a long delay that they would be releasing the EP on April 20, 2013. On April 19, 2013, it was revealed that the mixtape would be released on iTunes as a 6 track EP.

== Recording and production ==
In April 2013, in an interview with XXL, Currensy spoke about the incorporation of flutes on the EP, saying: "Let’s think about what Ron Burgundy’s jazz flute did to Mrs. Corningstone. Ron Burgundy mastered that flute and it made him able to bring her to Pleasure Town on animated horses and they were fuckin’ out in the solar system and all of that. So how could we not employ the talents of Ron Burgundy and his jazz flute on as many cuts as possible for Live in Concert. Nah, man. Honestly, that is the genius that is Bobbi Humphrey and his album that was put together long before me and my brother Wiz ever thought about rapping. [Laughs] I think at one point there's maybe like two minutes of flute and nothing else. It's for everybody's soul, man. Some people don't understand it immediately, but after they give it a second and third listen, they understand the music." He went on to explain the sample clearance issues with the EP, saying: "These are them sans one record that we didn’t put on because the person who owned the rights to that record…See we have no problem paying for clearances. I got no problem with that. But this guy, not only were we going to pay him for the sample clearance but he was trying to change lyrics. Things he didn’t like that Wiz said about a chick and shit he didn’t like that I said about weed. Basically we were like “Fam, if you don’t wanna make the bread then cool. We just won’t put the record out.” So homie chose not to pick up the bread and that's fine. We’re not gonna jump through all these hoops on someone's behalf when I feel like what we’re doing is going to put some more light on a body of work that our listeners don't know shit about. We want them to know about it. That's why we went through the proper channels to do it that way, so people who do their due diligence will see what this project sampled and want to hear that whole album. Then you pick up more money. You pick up the money ’cause we paid you to clear it and then you pick up the money from the kids who go to get the original album."

He also talked about when they originally recorded the EP, saying: "We had already recorded this shit all the way back when my foot was broken. This is last year when we did this. I was on crutches. So we were originally going to put it out August 9th, the three-year anniversary of How Fly, but we realized the publishing company might come for us. Not so much on my part, because I feel like I’m still underground, but my brother done got so far up I thought they might feel some kind of way. If it was just me, it might fly under the radar, but to protect my brother we had to do it the right way. So it just took forever to get it right. This shit had been done. The only reason we went back in the studio and you’re seeing these pieces of video of us in the studio is because we recently went back in the studio like two weeks ago out in Cali just to listen to everything ’cause you know, I don’t listen to nothing that I record. So [Wiz] was like “Come on, let’s go listen to this in the studio and make sure everything’s gravy." He also spoke about how it was recording the EP with Wiz Khalifa, saying: "Honestly, it’s exactly the same. It’s just we got way more trees to twist up and way more for everything. It used to be we got X-amount for pizza, X-amount for bud, X-amount for drink and then we gotta pay for studio time. But now it’s like… [Laughs] We just do whatever we want. It’s really the same, but we just put the cheat code in. So now we got like infinite bullets and 30 lives." On May 10, 2013, the music video for "Toast" was released.

== Critical reception ==
Professional ratings
Review scores
Source	Rating
HipHopDX	3/5 stars
XXL	(L)

Live in Concert was met with generally mixed reviews from music critics. Bruce Smith of HipHopDX gave the album three out of five stars, saying "While you only get so much Curren$y on Live In Concert, on “Toast,” which features another Humphrey sample (this time, it's “Mestizo Eyes”), he displays a little of his talents, with wordplay and car talk for the whip fanatics, rhyming, “Get it done when the time is crunch like sit-ups / To the challenge I rise, Lamborghini doors / ‘85 Countach never seen a real road / From the show room floor, to my seven car garage / Got a storage cross town, with like seven more rides, tucked inside / The Grand Theft Auto life / Rolling up in my safe house, I’m looking down / Done it by my design, refusing to compromise…” If the goal of Live In Concert was simply to set the mood for April 20, the sample choices probably accomplished the goal for most. Those looking for How Fly 2, or simply a project showcasing what Khalifa and Curren$y do best are bound to be let down. The two rappers aren't even present for most of the EP, and when they are, it's not their best showing." Christian Mordi of XXL gave the EP an L, saying "Clocking in at under 25 minutes, Live in Concert is on the short side but is potent nevertheless, giving fans exactly what was expected (with the exception of these flute solos). It’s predictable, enjoyable, warm-weather music that will be embraced with open arms by Jet Life and Taylor Gang fans alike."

== Commercial performance ==
Live in Concert debuted at number 30 on the US Billboard 200 selling 13,000 copies in its first week of release. In its second week, the EP sold 4,200 more copies bringing its total sales to 18,000.

== Track listing ==
No.	Title	Length
1.	"Cabana"	3:03
2.	"Landing"	3:39
3.	"The Blend"	3:59
4.	"Toast"	3:47
5.	"Revenge and Cake"	5:08
6.	"For Her"	4:32
Total length:		24:08

== Release history ==
Region	Date	Label
United States	April 20, 2013	Jet Life Recordings, Rostrum Records
