= IHipHop Distribution =

iHipHop Distribution
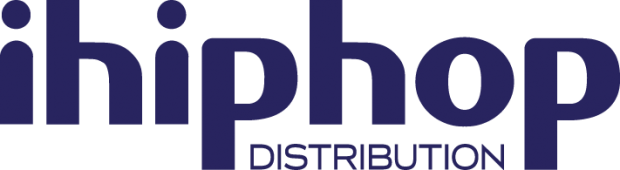
- Founded: 2009
- Status: Active
- Distributor: E1 Music
- Genre: Hip hop, Electronic
- Country of origin: United States
- Location: Los Angeles, California
- Official website: www.distribution.ihiphop.com

iHipHop Distribution was founded in 2009 in an attempt to provide artists and record labels with a new paradigm for distributing their music and building their brand. iHipHop Distribution has worked successfully with many artists and continues its partnership with the A3C Hip-Hop Festival for the release of its annual Hip-Hop compilation. When distributing music other than Hip-Hop, the company uses the moniker iH2D.

iHipHop Distribution maintains its own worldwide digital distribution platform, iHipHopDistribution.com, providing distribution and marketing services to artists globally. iHipHop Distribution also has its own worldwide vinyl distribution network which focuses on specialty vinyl pressings. iHipHop Distribution currently distributes titles from the following labels: Rostrum Records, Jet Life Recordings (Currensy), LVLYSL (Neako), Elephant Soundz (Marz Lovejoy), A3C, Cinematic Music Group, Goon MuSick (Snowgoons), Switchblade, The Barnes Corp (Trademark Da Skydiver), among others.

== Labels ==
- Rostrum Records (Wiz Khalifa)
- GCODED GLOBAL (RIGHTJUST)
- Jet Life Recordings (Currensy)
- LVLYSL (Neako)
- Elephant Soundz (Marz Lovejoy)
- A3C - Grade A Grade A Productions (Juice Wrld) (Clever)
- Cinematic Music Group
- Goon MuSick (Snowgoons)
- Switchblade
- The Barnes Corp (Trademark Da Skydiver)
- ETD Recordings
- IGC Recordings (Cannibal Ox)
- My Block Recordz (Daraja Hakizimana)
- RFC Music Group (Smoke DZA)
- Truly Blessed Productions (SD)
- Good$ense (Young Roddy)

== Discography ==
- 2009: Snowgoons - "The Trojan Horse"
- 2009: Wu-Tang Clan - "Wu-Tang Meets the Indie Culture, Vol. 2: Enter the Dubstep"
- 2009: Wiz Khalifa - "Deal or No Deal"
- 2010: Trademark Da Skydiver - "Issue # 1: Da $kydiver"
- 2010: 9th Prince (of Killarmy - "Granddaddy Flow (re-issue)
- 2010: Trademark Da Skydiver - "Issue # 2: Super Villain"
- 2010: 9th Prince (of Killarmy - "One Man Army"
- 2010: Wisemen - "Children of a Lesser God"
- 2010: LaVish - "Hometown Hero"
- 2010: Smoke DZA - "George Kush Da Button"
- 2010: Trademark Da Skydiver - "Issue # 3: Reign Supreme"
- 2010: Tabi Bonney - "Fresh"
- 2010: Marz Lovejoy - "This Little Light of Mine"
- 2010: Polyester: "Peace - Love - Unity - Respect"
- 2010: Brand Nubian - "Enter The Dubstep Vol. 2"
- 2011: Rocky Business: - "A Rebel's Roar!"
- 2011: Smoke DZA - "Rolling Stoned"
- 2011: Bronze Nazareth - "School for the Blindman"
- 2011: Various Artists (A3C Festival) - "A3C Volume 1"
- 2011: Reef the Lost Cauze & Snowgoons - "Your Favorite MC
- 2011: Jet Life - "Jet World Order"
- 2012: Jet Life - "Jet World Order 2"
- 2012: Various Artists (A3C Festival) - "A3C Volume 2"
- 2012: Neako - "These Are The Days"
- 2013: Trademark Da Skydiver - "Flamingo Barnes"
- 2013: Trademark Da Skydiver - "Flamingo Barnes 2: Mingo Royale"
- 2013: Various Artists (A3C Festival) - "A3C Volume 3"
- 2013: Cannibal Ox - "The Cold Vein" (re-issue)
- 2013: Cannibal Ox - "Gotham"
- 2014: SD - "Life Of A Savage 3"

== Artists with releases on iHipHop Distribution ==
- 9th Prince (of Killarmy)
- Brand Nubian
- Bronze Nazareth
- Cannibal Ox
- Jet Life
- LaVish
- Marz Lovejoy
- Neako
- Polyester
- Reef the Lost Cauze
- RIGHTJUST
- Rocky Business
- Smoke DZA
- Snowgoons
- Tabi Bonney
- Various Artists (A3C Festival)
- Wisemen
- Wiz Khalifa
- Wu-Tang Clan
- $not
