= Weekend at Burnie's =

Studio album by Curren$y
- Released: June 28, 2011
- Recorded: 2011
- Genre: Hip hop
- Length: 43:56
- Label: Jet Life; Warner Bros.
- Producer: Monsta Beatz; Rahki

Curren$y chronology
Covert Coup (2011)	Weekend at Burnie's (2011)	Muscle Car Chronicles (2012)

Professional ratings
Aggregate scores
Source	Rating
AnyDecentMusic?	7.2/10
Metacritic	77/100
Review scores
Source	Rating
AllMusic	3.5/5 stars
The A.V. Club	B
Beats Per Minute	90%
Blare	3.5/5 stars
Cokemachineglow	84%
Consequence of Sound	C−
HipHopDX	3/5 stars
Pitchfork	8.0/10
Prefix	7.5/10
Spectrum Culture	3/5 stars

Weekend at Burnie's is the fifth studio album by American rapper Curren$y. The album was released on June 28, 2011, through Jet Life and Warner Bros. Eleven tracks on this album are produced by Monsta Beatz. The album's lead single, "#JetsGo" is produced by Rahki. "You See It" and "This Is the Life" were leaked to promote the album. On June 21 Curren$y premiered the album during a Ustream-Session. It featured the Bonus Tracks "JLC" and "Get Paid." In its first week, the album sold 23,000 copies in the US, after a Billboard 200 debut of #22.

== Critical reception ==
Weekend at Burnie's was met with "generally favorable" reviews from critics. At Metacritic, which assigns a weighted average rating out of 100 to reviews from mainstream publications, this release received an average score of 77 based on 12 reviews. Aggregate website AnyDecentMusic? gave the release a 7.2 out of 10 based on a critical consensus of 5 reviews.

In a review for AllMusic, critic reviewer David Jeffries said: Currensy's Weekend at Burnie's EP and/or mixtape is a worthwhile distraction, offering fans of his Pilot Talk efforts a chance to hear the rapper in a different setting. Here, the setting is hard, minimal, and retro, with producer Monsta Beatz bringing the ‘80s flavor on all tracks." Andres Tardio of HipHopDX gave the release a 3 out of 5, explaining: "There's an inconsistency on Weekend at Burnie's that keeps it from being fully successful. At some points, Curren$y shows why he was given the Spitta moniker, but other times, he shows how limited his flow and subject matter can be, slowly pushing through tracks with no real focus." At Pitchfork, Tom Breihan wrote: "Weekend at Burnie's is remarkably warm and approachable, and it brings Curren$y closer to the sound of current radio-rap than he's been in a while."

=== Accolades ===
Publications' year-end list appearances for Weekend at Burnie's
Critic/Publication	List	Rank	Ref
Beats Per Minute	Beats Per Minute's Top 50 Albums of 2011	33	
Cokemachineglow	Cokemachineglow's Top 50 Albums of 2011	22	

== Track listing ==
No.	Title	Writer(s)	Producer(s)	Length
1.	"#JetsGo"	Shante Franklin; Clifford Smith; Daniel Tannenbaum; Columbus Smith III	Rahki	3:13
2.	"Still" (featuring Trademark da Skydiver and Young Roddy)	S. Franklin; Daryl Harleaux; John Fitch; Alex Washington; Roderick Brisco	Monsta Beatz	3:31
3.	"She Don't Want a Man"	S. Franklin; D. Harleaux	Monsta Beatz	4:32
4.	"One Life"	S. Franklin; D. Harleaux	Monsta Beatz	3:04
5.	"You See It"	S. Franklin; D. Harleaux	Monsta Beatz	3:33
6.	"Televised" (featuring Fiend)	S. Franklin; D. Harleaux; Richard Jones	Monsta Beatz	5:26
7.	"This Is the Life"	S. Franklin; D. Harleaux	Monsta Beatz	3:58
8.	"On G's" (featuring Young Roddy and Trademark da Skydiver)	S. Franklin; D. Harleaux; Washington	Monsta Beatz	4:27
9.	"Money Machine"	S. Franklin; D. Harleaux	Monsta Beatz	3:22
10.	"What's What"	S. Franklin; D. Harleaux	Monsta Beatz	2:09
11.	"JLC" (bonus track)	S. Franklin; D. Harleaux	Monsta Beatz	2:31
12.	"Get Paid" (featuring Young Roddy and Trademark da Skydiver) (bonus track)	S. Franklin; D. Harleaux; Washington	Monsta Beatz	4:10

== Charts ==
=== Weekly charts ===
Chart performance for Weekend at Burnie's
Chart (2011)	Peak position
US Billboard 200	22
US Top R&B/Hip-Hop Albums (Billboard)	6
US Top Rap Albums (Billboard)	4

=== Year-end charts ===
Chart (2011)	Position
US Top R&B/Hip-Hop Albums (Billboard)	97
