= The1st28 =

#The1st28

Mixtape by Curren$y & Styles P
- Released: February 28, 2012
- Recorded: 2012
- Genre: Hip hop
- Length: 16:36
- Label: Jet Life Recordings, D-Block Records
- Producer: Monsta Beatz

Curren$y chronology
Here... (2012)	#The1st28 (2012)	The Stoned Immaculate (2012)

Styles P chronology
Master of Ceremonies (2011)	#The1st28 (2012)	The Diamond Life Project (2012)

#The1st28 is the collaborative mixtape by American rappers Curren$y and Styles P. It was released for online download on February 28, 2012. The mixtape was entirely produced by Monsta Beatz.

== Track listing ==
- All songs produced by Monsta Beatz

No.	Title	Length
1.	"Rule Book"	2:54
2.	"Jekell n Hyde"	2:56
3.	"Lean" (featuring Fiend)	4:09
4.	"Go" (featuring Daz Dillinger)	3:39
5.	"Billions" (featuring Dee Low)	2:58
