= This Ain't No Mixtape =

Studio album by Curren$y
- Released: April 21, 2009 (Digital); June 28, 2011 (Physical)
- Recorded: 2008–09
- Genre: Hip-hop
- Length: 70:20
- Label: Amalgam Digital
- Producer: Monsta Beatz

Curren$y chronology
This Ain't No Mixtape (2009)	Jet Files (2009)

Singles from This Ain't No Mixtape
- 1. "Elevator Musik" Released: September 14, 2009; 2. "16 Switches" Released: September 14, 2009

This Ain't No Mixtape is the debut studio album by American rapper Curren$y. It was released digitally on April 21, 2009, while it was released physically on June 28, 2011, by Amalgam Digital. The entire album was produced by Monsta Beatz. Leading up to the release, Curren$y released a series of highly touted mixtapes, hence the album's title. The album cover was inspired by the video game Grand Theft Auto: Vice City (2002).

== Track listing ==
- All tracks produced by Monsta Beatz.

This Ain't No Mixtape
No.	Title	Length
1.	"The Briefing"	4:08
2.	"Get It Ya Self" (featuring Dee Low and Jean LePhare)	3:32
3.	"Blown Away" (featuring Dee Low and Jean LePhare)	4:28
4.	"Scared of Monstas"	2:58
5.	"Elevator Musik"	3:09
6.	"On My Plane" (featuring Dee Low and Jean LePhare)	3:04
7.	"16 Switches"	3:04
8.	"The Jets Son" (featuring Dee Low and Jean LePhare)	4:03
9.	"LOL" (featuring Trademark da Skydiver, Dee Low, and Jean LePhare)	3:49
10.	"Sail On" (featuring Young Chris)	3:45
11.	"Got It"	3:26
12.	"Power Button"	3:23
13.	"Up Here" (featuring Young Roddy)	4:27
14.	"Cook Up" (featuring Bun B and Dee Low)	4:23
15.	"Food 4 Thought" (featuring Mickey Factz and Amanda Diva)	4:07
16.	"Galaxy" (featuring Dee Low, Jean LePhare, and Whodinsky)	4:26
17.	"Look Up at the Jets" (Amalgam Digital bonus track)	3:17
18.	"Top of the Money" (Amalgam Digital bonus track)	2:47
19.	"Something Like" (featuring Street Wiz and Fiend) (Amalgam Digital bonus Track)	4:13
