= The Stoned Immaculate =

2012 studio album by Curren$y

Studio album by Curren$y
- Released: June 5, 2012
- Recorded: 2011 – March 2012
- Genre: Hip-hop
- Length: 84:38
- Label: Jet Life; Warner Bros.
- Producer: Pharrell; J.U.S.T.I.C.E. League; Bink!; Big K.R.I.T.; Daz Dillinger; Sean C & LV; Rashad Thomas; Tone P; Monsta Beatz; The Youngstars; The Innovatorz; The Futuristiks; Rahki; Cardo; Butcher Brown

Curren$y chronology
Muscle Car Chronicles (2012)	The Stoned Immaculate (2012)	Live in Concert (2013)

Singles from The Stoned Immaculate
- 1. "What It Look Like" Released: April 10, 2012; 2. "Jet Life" Released: May 28, 2012

The Stoned Immaculate is the sixth studio album by American hip-hop recording artist Curren$y. It was released through Jet Life Recordings and Warner Bros. Records on June 5, 2012. This release was his first "major" release through Warner Bros. The album features guest appearances from Pharrell, Wiz Khalifa, Estelle, 2 Chainz, Wale, Marsha Ambrosius, Daz Dillinger, Big K.R.I.T., Fiend, Corner Boy P, Young Roddy, Trademark da Skydiver, and Smoke DZA.

The cover artwork was inspired by the 1973 film Heavy Traffic.

== Background ==
Currensy officially announced the release of The Stoned Immaculate, this second release on Warner Bros. Records, on November 11, 2011. It was first set to be released in March/April 2012 but was pushed back to May 22 and finally to June 5. On March 10, 2012, Currensy announced he officially completed the album.

Currensy explained during an interview with HipHopDX that The Stoned Immaculate was more complicated to record than his previous albums and noted that he had finished off past projects in only a few days: "Just from working with more people. I did more traveling than I usually do when I'm working on a project. I did Weekend at Burnie's in Miami with Monsta Beatz in two days. With this one I moved around. I was in L.A. with Daz, in Miami with Pharrell, and I recorded some of the records in New York and shit. That's really the only difference, the music and my mindset is still the same", The album featured West Coast artist and producer, Daz Dillinger, which Currensy explained, "I tried to find Daz a few times on Twitter but that didn't really work out. One time in a meeting with Warner [Bros. Records] I brought up his name and asked them to try find Daz for me. A couple days after the meeting I got his e-mail and we smoked, burned it down, made sure everything was cool and did some work."

The title of the album is a reference to lyrics from the song "The WASP (Texas Radio and the Big Beat)" by American rock band The Doors, off of their 1971 album release L.A. Woman. In the track, lead singer Jim Morrison sings "Out here on the perimeter there are no stars/Out here we is stoned – immaculate."

== Promotion ==
On February 5, 2012, Currensy released a five-track mixtape titled Here.... On February 28, 2012, Currensy released a five-track joint-EP with Styles P titled #The1st28. On March 20, 2012, Currensy previewed three new tracks, "Sunroof", "Stainless", and "No Squares", live on Shade 45. On April 10, 2012, Currensy went on Toca Tuesdays to freestyle and promote the album. The album became available to pre-order on April 20, 2012, on Currensy's official website.

Currensy held an alternate cover contest and a tour video footage contest on his official site with different available prizes. On May 17, Currensy leaked the song "Capitol" (featuring 2 Chainz) with production from The Innovatorz via Stereogum. On May 31, the song "Chasin' Paper" (featuring Pharrell) was leaked via KanyeToThe.com. On May 31, Currensy held an exclusive album livestream of his Webster Hall performance via YouTube, as he wrapped up his 47-city "Jet Life" tour.

== Singles ==
The first single, "What It Look Like" (featuring Wale) was leaked on the internet on April 3, 2012, and released to digital retailers on April 10, 2012. The music video was released on April 7, 2012. The song, "Fast Cars, Faster Women" (featuring Daz), was released along with a pre-order of the album on Currensy's official website on 4/20, which served as a street single for the album. The official second single, "Jet Life" (featuring Wiz Khalifa and Big K.R.I.T.), with production by Big K.R.I.T., was released via YouTube on May 28, 2012. A remix to "Jet Life" called "Don't Miss This Jet" featuring Jeezy and Lil Wayne was released on July 3, 2012.

== Music videos ==
On April 8, 2012, the music video was released for "What It Look Like", featuring Wale. On May 10, 2012, the music video was released for "Fast Cars Faster Women", featuring Daz Dillinger. On June 5, 2012, the music video was released for "Capitol", featuring 2 Chainz. On July 4, 2012, the music video was released for "Showroom". On September 18, 2012, the music video was released for "Jet Life", featuring Wiz Khalifa and Big K.R.I.T. On November 11, 2012, the music video was released for "Chandelier". On June 3, 2013, the music video was released for "Sunroof", featuring Corner Boy P.

== Reception ==
The Stoned Immaculate received generally favorable reviews from contemporary music critics. At Metacritic, which assigns a normalized rating out of 100 to reviews from mainstream critics, the album received an average score of 73, based on 16 reviews.

=== Commercial performance ===
The Stoned Immaculate is Currensy's highest-charting album, debuting at number 8 on the U.S. Billboard 200 chart with first-week sales of 36,100 copies. The album also debuted at number 2 on the Top R&B/Hip-Hop Albums as well as the Top Rap Albums. As of November 2015, the album has sold 93,000 units.

== Track listing ==
No.	Title	Producer(s)	Length
1.	"What It Look Like" (featuring Wale)	Bink!	4:08
2.	"Privacy Glass"	Rashad	3:40
3.	"Armoire" (featuring Young Roddy & Trademark da Skydiver)	Monsta Beatz	3:53
4.	"Take You There" (featuring Marsha Ambrosius)	J.U.S.T.I.C.E. League	3:23
5.	"Showroom"	Cardo (Incorrectly credited as The Futuristiks)	4:08
6.	"Capitol" (featuring 2 Chainz)	The Innovatorz (Incorrectly credited as The Innovators)	5:05
7.	"No Squares" (featuring Wiz Khalifa)	The Futuristiks	5:14
8.	"Sunroof" (featuring Corner Boy P)	Monsta Beatz	4:34
9.	"Chasin' Paper" (featuring Pharrell)	Pharrell	3:45
10.	"That's the Thing" (featuring Estelle)	J.U.S.T.I.C.E. League	4:02
11.	"Chandelier"	Tone P	5:07
12.	"Fast Cars Faster Women" (featuring Daz Dillinger)	Daz Dillinger	3:45
13.	"Jet Life" (featuring Big K.R.I.T. & Wiz Khalifa)	Big K.R.I.T.	4:24
14.	"Audio Dope III" (digital bonus track)	Sean C & LV (Grind Music)	2:43
15.	"One More Time" (digital bonus track)	The Innovatorz	4:03
16.	"J.L.R." (featuring Young Roddy & Smoke DZA) (digital bonus track)	The Youngstars (Incorrectly credited as The Youngstarz)	4:39
17.	"Lost in the Bossness" (featuring Trademark da Skydiver & Young Roddy) (Cricket/Spotify bonus track)	Rahki; Butcher Brown	4:42
18.	"Off Dat" (Spotify bonus track)	Rashad for Elev8tor Music	4:08
19.	"Legal Crack" (featuring Fiend) (Warner Bros website bonus track)	Daz Dillinger	4:41

Sample credits

- "No Squares" features excerpts from the Gerard Marino recording "Death Of Kratos".
- "Sunroof" features an interpolation of "Na Boca Do Sol" (Arthur Verocai, Victor Martins).
- "Chasin' Paper" contains an interpolation of "Ooh Child" by Five Stairsteps, written by Stan Vincent.
- "Audio Dope III" features excerpts from the Giorgos Hatzinasios recording "Pursuit".
- "One More Time" features excerpts from the Deniece Williams recording "Why Can't We Fall In Love".
- "J.L.R." contains excerpts from "Love Theme" written by Kazuya Senke and Yuji Ohno.
- "Off Dat" features an interpolation of "If You Didn't Love Me (Don't Go Away)" (D.W. Julius Rogers).

== Release history ==
Country	Date	Format(s)
United States	June 5, 2012	CD, digital download

== Charts ==
=== Weekly charts ===
Chart (2012)	Peak position
Canadian Albums Chart	74
US Billboard 200	8
US Top R&B/Hip-Hop Albums (Billboard)	2
US Top Rap Albums (Billboard)	2

=== Year-end charts ===
Chart (2012)	Position
US Top R&B/Hip-Hop Albums (Billboard)	71
