= Jet Life =

American hip hop group

- Origin: New Orleans, Louisiana, U.S.
- Genre: Hip hop
- Years active: 2009–present
- Label: Jet Life Recordings
- Members: Curren$y; Fendi P
- Past members: Trademark da Skydiver; Young Roddy; T.Y.

Jet Life is an American hip hop collective formed in New Orleans, Louisiana, originally consisting of rappers Curren$y, Trademark da Skydiver, and Young Roddy. All members of the Jet Life collective are signed to Jet Life Recordings, which is owned and operated by Curren$y. The collective is also known by the names Jet Life Crew, The JETS, sometimes stylized as The J.E.T.S. or The JET$, and as Jets International.

== History ==
=== 2011-present: Jet World Order and Jet World Order 2 ===
Trademark Da Skydiver and Young Roddy first appeared in collaboration with long-time friend and mentor Curren$y on his album "Pilot Talk." Since then, he has referred to them as his Jet Life Crew, with the addition of new members in 2011. The name of the group is a term that Curren$y and The JETS often use to describe the "high life" that they claim to live. This life is marked by an extravagant lifestyle. It also alludes to their glorified use of marijuana, both of which are evident in Jet Life's lyrics. The acronym J.E.T.S. stands for "Just Enjoy This Shit", and furthermore exemplifies the crew's carefree and positive perspective on life. The acronym was first popularized by Curren$y. Jet Life calls their style "luxury rap", in which they rap about their everyday lifestyle and things they do. The JETS are also known to be "weed-rappers"; titles of their songs include "Paper Habits," "Smoke Break," and "We Get High."

On February 1, 2011, Curren$y signed to major record label Warner Bros. Records, becoming the CEO of his imprint Jet Life Recordings. Curren$y's long-time companions Trademark Da Skydiver and Young Roddy were immediately the first signees on board Jet Life Recordings, shortly followed by Fiend, Street Wiz, and Monsta Beatz. On October 23, 2011, Curren$y signed major artist Sir Michael Rocks of The Cool Kids to Jet Life Recordings. Three days later, on October 26, long-time collaborator Smoke DZA joined the label as well. In March 2011, original Jet Life members Trademark Da Skydiver and Young Roddy paired up to release the first project from members of the Jet Life collective. The duo released a free online mixtape titled "Jet Life To The Next Life," produced by Cookin’ Soul, in March 2011. The project features Curren$y on four tracks entitled "Spitta Intro", "Jet Set", "No Days Off", and "Jet Life to the Next Life." The mixtape has all the original production. Curren$y's solo project entitled "Covert Coup" produced entirely by The Alchemist, was then produced under the new label in April 2011, with individual features from Jet Life members Smoke DZA and Fiend. Smoke DZA and producer Harry Fraud released "Rugby Thompson" via High Times Records/Cinematic Music Group in April 2012 which received positive views from music magazine XXL, among other critics.

Curren$y presented Jet Life's debut album, "Jet World Order", on November 29, 2011 via Jets International and iHipHop Distribution. Both Trademark Da Skydiver and Young Roddy appear on every track. Curren$y appears on three tracks entitled "Exhale," "Excellent," and "1st Place." The sole single from the album was "1st Place" produced by Show Off, which was released on iTunes on November 2, 2011. Other features include Jet Life members Nesby Phips, Sir Michael Rocks, Smoke DZA, Corner Boy P, Fiend, and Street Wiz. The album placed on the year's Billboard 200 at number 148 in the United States. The album also charted Billboard at #25 for Hip-Hop/R&B Albums and #3 for Heatseekers Albums. In late July 2012, Curren$y revealed the name of two upcoming Jet Life projects in an interview with AllHipHop.com. The first is titled "Curren$y presents: New Jet City," which will be headed by Curren$y and will feature the Jet Life Crew. Curren$y says the album will be a compilation, but Young Roddy will "take the wheel." The other project was Jet Life's second studio album, "Jet World Order 2" which was released on November 20, 2012. The first single off of Jet Life's "Jet World Order 2" was "No Sleep".

== Members ==
- Curren$y
- Street Wiz
- Fiend
- Fendi P (Previously known as Corner Boy P)
- Mr. Marcelo
- G Style (Previously known as Tiny C Style)
- Mother MaryGold (Previously known as Mary Gold)
- Black Cobain
- Trill
- Jean Lephare
- Alia Fleury
- I'sis
- Zee Jets

== Former Artists ==
- Trademark da Skydiver
- Young Roddy
- MonstaBeatz
- Smoke DZA
- Sir Michael Rocks
- T.Y.
- Le$

== Discography ==
=== Studio albums ===
- Jet World Order (2011)
- Jet World Order 2 (2012)
- Plan Of Attack (2019)
- Welcome To Jet Life Recordings (2020)
- Welcome To Jet Life Recordings 2 (2021)

=== Mixtapes ===
- Jet Life To The Next Life (with Cookin’ Soul) (2011)
- Jet Life To The Next Life (Instrumentals) (with Cookin’ Soul) (2011)
- Red Eye Mixtape (2013)
- Organized Crime (2014)
- Audio D (2014)
- World Wide Hustlers (2014)
- Jet Life All Stars (2017)
- The Jetlanta (2017)
