= Canal Street Confidential =

Studio album by Curren$y
- Released: December 4, 2015
- Recorded: 2015
- Genre: Hip hop
- Length: 41:23
- Labels: Jet Life; Atlantic
- Producers: Acebranding; Ben Billions; Big Fruit; Cash Fargo; Cool & Dre; Cookin' Soul; DJ Spinz; Dun Deal; Geoffro; KE; KLC; Like; Purps; Super Miles

Curren$y chronology
Pilot Talk III (2015)	Canal Street Confidential (2015)	Fetti (2018)

Singles from Canal Street Confidential
- 1. "Bottom of the Bottle" Released: August 28, 2015

Canal Street Confidential is the eighth studio album by American rapper Curren$y. The album was released on December 4, 2015, by Jet Life Recordings and Atlantic Records.

== Singles ==
On August 28, 2015 the album's first single "Bottom of the Bottle" featuring August Alsina and Lil Wayne was released. On October 30, 2015, the official music video was released.

== Critical reception ==
Professional ratings
Review scores
Source	Rating
AllMusic	3.5/5 stars
Consequence of Sound	D+
HipHopDX	3/5 stars

Canal Street Confidential was met with mixed reviews from music critics. David Jeffries of AllMusic said, "It's another lark from a man who has taken plenty of them before, and while some may look to his major-label efforts for the more well-rounded LPs, they can check the Pilot Talk series for that kind of breadth, and appreciate Canal Street Confidential for the sharp and well-executed idea that it is." Ryan Staskel of Consequence of Sound gave the album a D+, saying "What we have here is an artist in cruise control taking a premature victory lap. If the Pilot Talk trilogy is Curren$y’s sky-high flight of fancy, then Canal Street Confidential feels more like a cab ride the day after a late night. “Roll one up for them haters,” Franklin rhymes on Canal Street Confidential. With that I ask, does anyone have a light?" Jesse Fairfax of HipHopDX said, "Largely unmemorable and full of cameos that only wind up watering down Curren$y’s potential for excellence, Canal Street Confidential is a textbook case of an artist with a cult following attempting to make use of a greater budget. Possibly the result of label interference, he trades innovation for collaborations that neither guarantee new fans or manage to impress believers."

== Commercial performance ==
In the United States, the album debuted at number 30 on the Billboard 200, selling nearly 21,000 units in its first week.

== Track listing ==
No.	Title	Producer(s)	Length
1.	"Drive By" (featuring Future)	Purps	3:44
2.	"Everywhere"	Purps	4:20
3.	"How High" (featuring Lloyd)	Purps	3:58
4.	"Speed"	Purps	4:17
5.	"What's Up" (featuring K Camp)	KE; Super Miles; Big Fruit^{[a]}	4:57
6.	"Winning" (featuring Wiz Khalifa)	Purps	3:45
7.	"Bottom of the Bottle" (featuring August Alsina and Lil Wayne)	DJ Spinz; Dun Deal; Geoffro	3:58
8.	"Cruzin..."	Like; Acebranding	2:27
9.	"Superstar" (featuring Ty Dolla Sign)	Cool & Dre	4:03
10.	"Boulders"	Purps	3:26
11.	"All Wit My Hands"	Cookin' Soul	2:28
Total length:			41:23

Deluxe edition bonus tracks
No.	Title	Producer(s)	Length
12.	"The Game"	Cash Fargo; KLC^{[a]}	3:05
13.	"Str8" (featuring Corner Boy P and Fiend)	KLC; Ben Billions	4:27
Total length:			48:55

Notes

- ^{^a} signifies an additional producer.

== Charts ==
=== Weekly charts ===
Chart (2015)	Peak position
US Billboard 200	30
US Top R&B/Hip-Hop Albums (Billboard)	6

=== Year-end charts ===
Chart (2016)	Position
US Top R&B/Hip-Hop Albums (Billboard)	94
