= Muscle Car Chronicles =

Studio album by Curren$y and Sean O'Connell
- Released: February 14, 2012
- Recorded: 2009–2010
- Genre: Hip hop; alternative hip hop
- Length: 19:23
- Label: DD172
- Producer: Damon Dash (exec.); Sean O'Connell

Curren$y and Sean O'Connell chronology
Weekend At Burnie's (2011)	Muscle Car Chronicles (2012)	The Stoned Immaculate (2012)

Professional ratings
Review scores
Source	Rating
HipHop DX	4/5 stars
XXL	(XL)

Muscle Car Chronicles is a collaboration studio album by American rapper Curren$y and Sean O'Connell. It is produced by Sean O'Connell and contains features of Mikey Rocks of The Cool Kids and Tabi Bonney. A movie for this album has been produced. It was going to be released along with the album. It is Curren$y's final album released through DD172; he is now signed to Warner Bros. The album was released on February 14, 2012. The iTunes edition of the album features 10 bonus country rock songs performed by Sean O'Connell.

== Track listing ==
- All tracks were produced by Sean O'Connell.

No.	Title	Length
1.	"Soundbombin'"	1:28
2.	"N.O. Shit"	1:39
3.	"Frosty"	2:01
4.	"Razors & Chopsticks"	1:53
5.	"Not So Much"	1:47
6.	"Fly Out (Part Deux)"	3:10
7.	"Bout It 2011"	2:56
8.	"The Strangest Life" (featuring Mckenzie Eddy)	1:25
9.	"Fly Out (Part Trés)" (featuring Mikey Rocks and Tabi Bonney)	3:04
Total length:		19:23
