= Marz Lovejoy =

American rapper

- Genres: Hip-hop, Rap, R&B, Pop, Electronic
- Years active: 2010–present
- Website: www.Marzyjane.com

Marz Lovejoy is a community organizer, student-midwife, curator, author, producer, editor-in-chief, model, and musician born in Minneapolis.

== Biography ==
Marz was born in Minneapolis, Minnesota and raised in Los Angeles and San Diego. She has lived in New York for 11 years. She was influenced by music at an early age, as her father is a deejay and her mother, a writer. She graduated from the New York Film Academy in Los Angeles (NYFA) in 2010. Marz first began writing in poems high school, which eventually evolved into full-length hip-hop tracks. Marz initially garnered attention by spreading videos of herself freestyling across social networks such as YouTube. This led to her connecting with frequent collaborator, Polyester, who produced the bulk of her debut EP.

Marz broke through and gained critical praise in April 2010 when she appeared on Pac Div's hit, “Shine.” After the success of “Shine,” Pac Div invited Marz to perform on their national tour, on which she opened for the group on 15 dates. On November 23, 2010, Marz released her debut EP, “This Little Light Of Mine” which was deemed a critical success, earning praise from outlets such as OkayPlayer.

Since the release of “This Little Light Of Mine” Marz has performed around the country. In October 2010, she performed with Wu-Tang Clan members GZA and Raekwon in New York City during a CMJ showcase. West Coast legend DJ Quik also went on to invite Marz to perform at his Quik's Grooves concert series in Hollywood. In 2011, she performed at SXSW where she opened for Erykah Badu. Jon Pareles of the New York Times deemed Marz “among the best [he] heard” at the music festival. She performed at the 2011 A3C Hip-Hop Festival in Atlanta and the 2011 CMJ Festival where she opened for legendary hip-hop duo, M.O.P. She also performed at SXSW in March 2012, opening for GZA, who was backed by Grupo Fantasma.

Marz has released multiple singles since the release of her debut EP. "Live Life" features Harlem New York's Smoke DZA and appears on his 2011 album entitled "Rolling Stoned." "I Can't Call It" features Like of Pac Div and Jason Madison and appears on the "A3C Volume 1" compilation released in connection with the 2011 festival, "Dolo" produced by Polyester, "Discouraged" produced by Om'Mas Keith and Mike Swoop and "One Night Only" which features Hippie Sabotage.

In April 2011, Marz landed her first feature film role in director Sheldon Candis’ “L.U.V.” The film stars Common, Michael K. Williams, Meagan Good, and Danny Glover.

In April 2014, Marz landed her second feature film role in director John Stockwell's "Kid Cannabis". The film stars Jonathan Daniel Brown, Kenny Wormald, Aaron Yoo, Ron Perlman and John C. McGinley.

In the January 2015, Marz was featured in Princess Nokia's music video for "Young Girls," focusing on a brown-bodied, female utopia.

After Marz opened for Hood By Air at New York Fashion Week in September 2015 and was featured on the front of Vogue.com, she has been a part of the fashion scene in New York, Copenhagen, and Paris.

In 2017, Marz married Office Magazine’s editor-in-chief, Simon Rasmussen. As the culture editor, Marz has played a role in shaping the identity of Office Magazine.

Marz was the first pregnant model to shoot for Rihanna's lingerie line, Savage X and was on the cover of Denmark's Costume Magazine.

In 2019, she self published her first children’s book, B-A-B-Y, illustrated by Steven Horton Jr.

In 2020, Marz released a 9-track EP on SoundCloud entitled, elePhant Soundz. During the rise of the pandemic and inspired by her second pregnancy, Marz raised $45k for Black Mothers and birth workers when she created a campaign around the live stream of her home birth. Months later, she went on to be the face of Nike’s debut (M)aternity line and organized a bike ride in New York City with Nike to celebrate and raise money for Black women.

Along with her fellow Black colleagues at Office Magazine, Marz created an exclusively Black magazine entitled, The Black Utopia. Volume 1 of The Black Utopia released January 2021.

After living in Copenhagen, Marz and Simon decided to separate.

Marz is a full-time Mother of three. From 2022-2024 she worked as The Curator-at-Large for artist, Alvaro Barrington's studio. Once she helped get the studio up and running, she transitioned into her passion of Midwifery.

Marz currently studies under two of Minnesota's only Black home birth Midwives and is the co-founder of Community Birth Twin Cities. She is a lead consultant for Post Fire where she works closely with iO Wright and Dena Natives to ensure integrity and intention as total loss survivors navigate rebuilding their lives.

Along with her New York based, annual bike ride, And Still We Ride, Marz continues to center community in the work that she does.

== Discography ==
- "Shine" Pac Div featuring Marz Lovejoy (Single) (2010)
- This Little Light Of Mine (EP) (2010)
- "Live Life" featuring Smoke DZA (Single) (2011)
- "I Can't Call It" Like of Pac Div and Jason Madison (Single) (2011)
- "Higher Learning (1:34AM)" Remy Banks featuring Marz Lovejoy & Meechy Darko (2012)
- "Dolo" (Single) (2013)
- "Discouraged" (Single) (2013)
- "Initiation" A$ton Matthews featuring Marz Lovejoy (2014)
- "One Night Only" featuring Hippie Sabotage (Single) (2014)
- "GoGoGo" Ethereal featuring Marz Lovejoy (2014)
- "Do Or Die" Joey Fatts featuring Marz Lovejoy (2014)
- "RedruM" Da$h featuring Marz Lovejoy (2015)
- "WorldMightEnd" Ethereal featuring Marz Lovejoy (2020)
- "Around" Ethereal featuring Marz Lovejoy (2020)
