= Jet Files =

Studio album by Curren$y
- Released: October 6, 2009
- Recorded: 2009
- Genre: Hip-hop
- Length: 46:53
- Label: Amalgam Digital
- Producer: Ced Hughes; Whitey; Big Chop; Sledgren; Fly.Union; Nesby Phips

Curren$y chronology
This Ain't No Mixtape (2009)	Jet Files (2009)	Pilot Talk (2010)

Singles from Jet Files
- 1. "Living the Life" Released: March 4, 2010

Jet Files is the second studio album by American rapper Curren$y. It was released digitally on October 6, 2009, while it was released physically on June 28, 2011, by Amalgam Digital.

== Track listing ==
Jet Files
No.	Title	Producer(s)	Length
1.	"The Dossier (In and Out)"	Ced Hughes	1:56
2.	"Perfect Time"	Whitey	4:00
3.	"On My Way"	Big Chop	3:13
4.	"Smoke N Maintain (In and Out)"	Whitey	2:12
5.	"Sleepless in New Orleans"	Sledgren	3:52
6.	"Stay Up" (featuring Fly.Union)	Fly.Union	3:08
7.	"Tokyo Drift"	Big Chop	1:49
8.	"The Seventies"	Nesby Phips; Whitey	3:15
9.	"The Pledge (In and Out)"	Big Chop	2:17
10.	"Burn an Ounce"	Whitey	3:32
11.	"Bring Her Home"	Whitey	3:37
12.	"I'm Just Dope"	Whitey	4:44
13.	"Fly Out" (Amalgam Digital bonus track)		3:32
14.	"Living the Life" (featuring Max B and Young Riot) (Amalgam Digital bonus track)	Whitey	5:46
