= 2009 (album) =

2019 studio album by Wiz Khalifa & Curren$y

Studio album by Wiz Khalifa & Curren$y
- Released: February 8, 2019
- Genre: Hip-hop
- Length: 40:18
- Labels: Jet Life; Atlantic
- Producers: Cardo; Dame Grease; DJ Fresh; Harry Fraud; Monsta Beatz; Nice Rec; Ricky P; Problem; Sledgren; Van Gogh; Z Cook

Wiz Khalifa chronology
Rolling Papers II (2018)	2009 (2019)	Fly Times Vol. 1: The Good Fly Young (2019)

Curren$y chronology
Fetti (2018)	2009 (2019)	Gran Turismo (2019)

2009 is a collaborative studio album by American rappers Wiz Khalifa and Curren$y. It was released on February 8, 2019 via Jet Life Recordings and Atlantic Records. Production was handled by Cardo, Dame Grease, DJ Fresh, Harry Fraud, Monsta Beatz, Ricky P, Sledgren, Van Gogh and Z Cook. It features guest appearances from Problem and Ty Dolla $ign.

== Reception ==
Professional ratings
Review scores
Source	Rating
HipHopDX	4/5
Pitchfork	6.3/10

2009 was met with generally positive reviews from critics.

== Commercial performance ==
In the United States, 2009 debuted at number 35 on the Billboard 200 with 16,000 album-equivalent units.

== Track listing ==
No.	Title	Producer(s)	Length
1.	"Garage Talk"	Dame Grease	2:56
2.	"10 Piece"	Dame Grease	2:48
3.	"Benz Boys" (featuring Ty Dolla $ign)	Dame Grease	3:38
4.	"The Life"	Cardo & Sledgren	3:03
5.	"Find a Way"	Cardo & Sledgren	3:01
6.	"Eastside"	Cardo & Sledgren	2:17
7.	"From the Start"	DJ Fresh	2:09
8.	"No Clout Chasin'"	Ricky P; Z Cook	2:51
9.	"Getting Loose" (featuring Problem)	Problem; Van Gogh	3:01
10.	"Stoned Gentleman"	Sledgren	2:54
11.	"First or Last"	Grand Ear; Nice Rec	2:38
12.	"Plot Twist"	Monsta Beatz	2:26
13.	"Bottle Poppers"	DJ Fresh	3:07
14.	"Forever Ball"	Harry Fraud	3:29
Total length:			40:18

== Charts ==
Chart (2019)	Peak position
US Billboard 200	35
US Top R&B/Hip-Hop Albums (Billboard)	19
