= Pilot Talk III =

Studio album by Curren$y
- Released: April 4, 2015
- Recorded: 2013–14
- Genre: Hip-hop
- Length: 53:00
- Label: Jet Life
- Producers: Curren$y (exec.); Antman Wonder; Cool & Dre; Edsclusive; Harry Fraud; Jahlil Beats; Joey Fatts; Ski Beatz; The Beat Bully

Curren$y chronology
The Stoned Immaculate (2012)	Pilot Talk III (2015)	Canal Street Confidential (2015)

Singles from Pilot Talk III
- 1. "Briefcase" Released: February 6, 2015; 2. "Cargo Planes" Released: February 12, 2015; 3. "Alert" Released: March 1, 2015; 4. "AD5" Released: March 5, 2015

Pilot Talk III is the seventh solo studio album by American rapper Curren$y. Serving as the third installment in his Pilot Talk series, it was released on April 4, 2015 via Jet Life Recordings. The album features guest appearances from Jadakiss, J. Townsend, Riff Raff, Styles P and Wiz Khalifa.

The album was exclusively released through the Jet Life website through a pre-order pack, and will be released digitally and physically at a later date. Pilot Talk IV would be released in late December 2021.

== Critical reception ==
Professional ratings
Aggregate scores
Source	Rating
Metacritic	78/100
Review scores
Source	Rating
Complex	3.5/5 stars
Consequence Of Sound	B
HipHopDX	3.5/5
Pitchfork	7.9/10

Pilot Talk 3 was met with generally favourable reviews from music critics. At Metacritic, which assigns a normalized rating out of 100 to reviews from mainstream publications, the album received an average score of 78 based on four reviews.

Julian Kimble of Pitchfork resumed: "Curren$y may not do "new", but he is very good at what he does: riffing on cars, money, women, weed, and obscure moments from television shows". Michael Madden of Consequence praised the album, writing: "there's virtually nothing not to like about Pilot Talk III. Like other Curren$y releases, it makes up for its lack of revelations with a contagious joyfulness". Kellan Miller of HipHopDX wrote: "while other artists are constantly on the prowl for the latest trend that will keep their names relevant, Spitta never ventures out of his own lane, and yet, his latest material never seems to spoil". B.J. Steiner of Complex stated: "as the third installment of Spitta's aircraft-themed series, Pilot Talk 3 finds the NOLA sky captain delivering a familiar set of luxury rap fairytales upon which he's built a quietly impressive career".

== Track listing ==
No.	Title	Producer(s)	Length
1.	"Opening Credits"	Cool & Dre	2:01
2.	"Long as the Lord Say"	Ski Beatz	4:37
3.	"Cargo Planes"	Joey Fatts	2:32
4.	"Froze" (featuring Riff Raff)	Harry Fraud	3:46
5.	"Get Down"	Ski Beatz	3:59
6.	"Sidewalk Show"	Ski Beatz	2:06
7.	"The 560 SL" (featuring Wiz Khalifa)	Edsclusive; Frank Dukes	5:01
8.	"Audio Dope 5"	Ski Beatz	3:30
9.	"Life I Chose" (featuring J. Townsend)	Cool & Dre	4:36
10.	"Pot Jar" (featuring Jadakiss)	Cool & Dre	4:29
11.	"Search Party"	Ski Beatz	3:22
12.	"All I Know"	Cool & Dre	3:26
13.	"Briefcase"	Ski Beatz	3:29
14.	"Lemonade Mimosas"	Jahlil Beats; The Beat Bully; Antman Wonder	3:07
15.	"Alert" (featuring Styles P)	Ski Beatz	3:12
