= Kid Cannabis =

- DVD cover
- Directed by: John Stockwell
- Screenplay by: John Stockwell
- Produced by: Gordon Bijelonic; Corey Large; Michael Becker
- Starring: Jonathan Daniel Brown; Kenny Wormald; Aaron Yoo; Ron Perlman; Colton D. Heath John C McGinley
- Cinematography: Peter Holland
- Edited by: Jon Berry; James Renfroe
- Music by: Irv Johnson
- Production companies: CRUSH FILMS; Wingman Productions; Imprint Entertainment; ARM Entertainment
- Distributed by: Well Go USA Entertainment
- Release date: March 16, 2014 (Miami International Film Festival)
- Running time: 109 min
- Country: United States
- Language: English
- Box office: $5,565

Kid Cannabis is a 2014 American biographical stoner black comedy drama film directed by John Stockwell. It is based on the true story of a teen named Nate Norman who dropped out of high school to build a multimillion-dollar marijuana ring by trafficking drugs with his friends through the woods across the US-Canada international border. The film was executive produced by Alan Pao, Datari Turner, Alison Lee, Rosanne Gooding-Silverwood, Mark Silverwood, Bic Tran, Mia Chang, Cain McKnight, and Steve Ware.

== Plot ==
The plot is based on a true story and follows Nate Norman, an eighteen-year-old high school dropout, who lives with his younger brother and single mom in northern Idaho. One day while delivering pizza he encounters a wealthy customer who tells him about the money to be made through drug trafficking marijuana from Canada. Nate later reads about the potency of Canadian weed in High Times Magazine and decides to recruit his friend Topher to help him with his grand plan. On their initial run, they cross the border to search for a supplier which leads them to a man who sells them $1,800 worth of marijuana. However, they quickly discovered later that the marijuana they purchased was of lower quality than they intended to purchase. Despite the low quality, the product proves successful and sells immediately, resulting in another run across the border. During their subsequent trip, they meet Nicole who sells them 300 pounds of her dad's premium quality marijuana, which would become their supply. After the success of this run and now that a high-quantity supplier has been secured, Nate secures a financier and establishes his credibility. He then recruits and trains additional friends, promising to pay them $3500 each a run. Following daily runs, they revel in their successes, indulging in lavish purchases and throwing major parties. At a party, Nate has an encounter with a rival drug trafficker, Brendan Butler, who worries he's losing business to Nate and his team. The two get into a gunfight and Brendan flees. Fearing for his business, Brendan hires two hitmen to rob and kill Nate and Topher. After a close call with the two hitmen, Nate understands the threat to his life and hires the hitmen out from under Brendan, unbeknownst to his team. The hitmen later murder Brendan and dump his body in the woods. Topher begins working in secret with others he personally recruited on drug runs, attempting to hide this from Nate. One of these runs leads to a shady participant trying to steal some marijuana for himself by hiding it in the woods to be picked up by himself later. When he goes to retrieve their product sometime later, he is pulled over by police and convinced to be a mole. During the next run with the team, the police are already waiting to arrest everyone because of their inside source. As police arrest and interrogate the crew, everyone, including Topher, turns in Nate as being the ringleader of the operation. The night before he's due to be arrested, Nate’s financier alerts him of the news and encourages him to flee. Nate immediately flees to Canada but later returns after his mother is threatened with money laundering charges. At the end of the film, their whereabouts and status at the point of release are detailed. It's revealed Nate could've received a lighter sentence if he had told the courts where he got the supply from, and he refused.

== Cast ==
- Jonathan Daniel Brown as Nate Norman
- Kenny Wormald as Topher
- John C. McGinley as John Grefard
- Ron Perlman as Barry Lerner
- Aaron Yoo as Brendan Butler
- Merritt Patterson as Nicole Grefard
- Amanda Tapping as Teressia Lee Franks (Norman)
- Corey Large as Giovanni
- Marz Lovejoy as Waitress

== Production ==
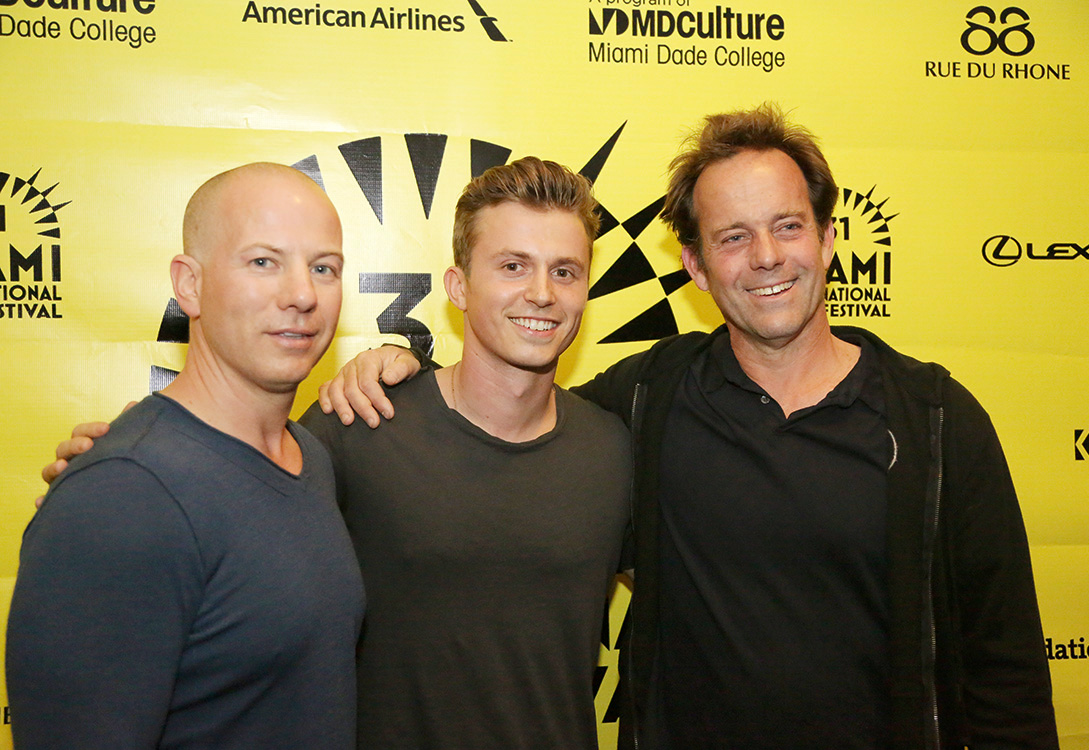
Producer Gordon Bijelonic, actor Kenny Wormald and director John Stockwell at the 2014 Miami International Film Festival presentation of Kid Cannabis

The film was inspired by an article on the real Nate Norman written by Mark Binelli for Rolling Stone magazine, which was published in 2005. The story is based on the life of Nate Norman, an overweight high-school dropout and pizza delivery man in Coeur d'Alene, Idaho, who built a multimillion-dollar business smuggling marijuana from Canada before eventually getting caught and sentenced to prison for 12 years. He was released early and is currently living in Coeur d’Alene.

Some scenes were shot in a marijuana-growing facility in Canada, to which the crew was driven in a van with blacked-out windows.

== Reception ==
On the review aggregator website Rotten Tomatoes, 71% of 7 critics' reviews are positive, with an average rating of 6.6/10. It also has a rating of 54 on Metacritic based on six reviews, indicating "average or mixed reviews." The Los Angeles Times noted that despite the portrayal, protagonist Nate is not treated sympathetically by the creators of the film. They also noted that Ron Perlman's performance was excellent. Slant Magazine praised director Stockwell for capturing the "half-baked hubris that often accompanies adolescence." The New York Times thought that the younger cast and Ron Perlman had a good performance, but didn't like the voice-over due to it feeling "forced and unfunny". The Hollywood Reporter enjoyed the performances, but didn't think it handled the genre shift very well.

Box Office Mojo lists total domestic theater sales, in one theater as $5,565.
