= Bottom of the Bottle =

Single by Curren$y featuring August Alsina and Lil Wayne

from the album Canal Street Confidential
- Released: August 28, 2015
- Recorded: 2015
- Genre: Hip hop
- Length: 3:59
- Label: Jet Life; Atlantic
- Songwriters: August Alsina; Dwayne Carter; Rick Cunningham Jr.; Shante Franklin; Priscilla Renea; Gary Rafael Hill
- Producers: DJ Spinz; Dun Deal; Geoffro

Curren$y singles chronology
"Don't Shoot" (2014)	"Bottom of the Bottle" (2015)

August Alsina singles chronology
"Why I Do It" (2015)	"Bottom of the Bottle" (2015)	"Gold Slugs" (2015)

Lil Wayne singles chronology
"Why I Do It" (2015)	"Bottom of the Bottle" (2015)	"Switch Up" (2015)

"Bottom of the Bottle" is a song by American rapper Currensy released by Jet Life Recordings and Atlantic Records on August 28, 2015, as the lead single from his eighth studio album, Canal Street Confidential (2015). It features guest appearances from fellow Louisiana-based acts, R&B singer August Alsina and rapper Lil Wayne; all three performers co-wrote the song with American singer Muni Long, along with its producers, Dun Deal, DJ Spinz and Geoffro.

== Background and release ==
The song premiered on August 27, 2015, and the next day was released for digital download as a single on iTunes. The album, Canal Street Confidential, was released on December 4, 2015. While talking about "Bottom of the Bottle" in an interview with Billboard magazine, Curren$y said;

I was concerned about how people was gon' feel about that record. When I put it out, I thought people might have been shocked because it was so radio-friendly and might turn their backs. They actually generally understood and was happy to even hear me on the radio.

== Critical reception ==
Uproxx's Beware Bowdon wrote that "Currensy might have his most viable single to date with "Bottom Of The Bottle"", also saying that the song "features all the elements of an actual radio hit". Alex Hudson of Exclaim! praised Alsina's vocals, writing that he has provided a "soulful hook" for the song. BET's Eric Diep wrote that it is a "radio-friendly single that has the potential to get some spins in the near future". Ryan Staskel from Consequence of Sound wrote that the song "showcases the album’s shortcomings with some cringe-worthy lyrics epitomized by Lil’ Wayne".

== Music video ==
The official music video premiered on WorldStarHipHop October 30, 2015 and was uploaded to Currensy's official YouTube account November 2, 2015. August Alsina does not appear in the video.

== Commercial performance ==
"Bottom of the Bottle" is Currensy's only single to enter the Billboard Hot 100, peaking at number 97.

== Charts ==
Chart (2015–16)	Peak position
US Billboard Hot 100	97
US Hot R&B/Hip-Hop Songs (Billboard)	29
US Rhythmic Airplay (Billboard)	23

== Certifications ==
Certifications
Region	Certification	Certified units/sales
New Zealand (RMNZ)	Gold	15,000^{‡}
^{‡} Sales+streaming figures based on certification alone.
