= Cookin' Soul =

Spanish beatmaker

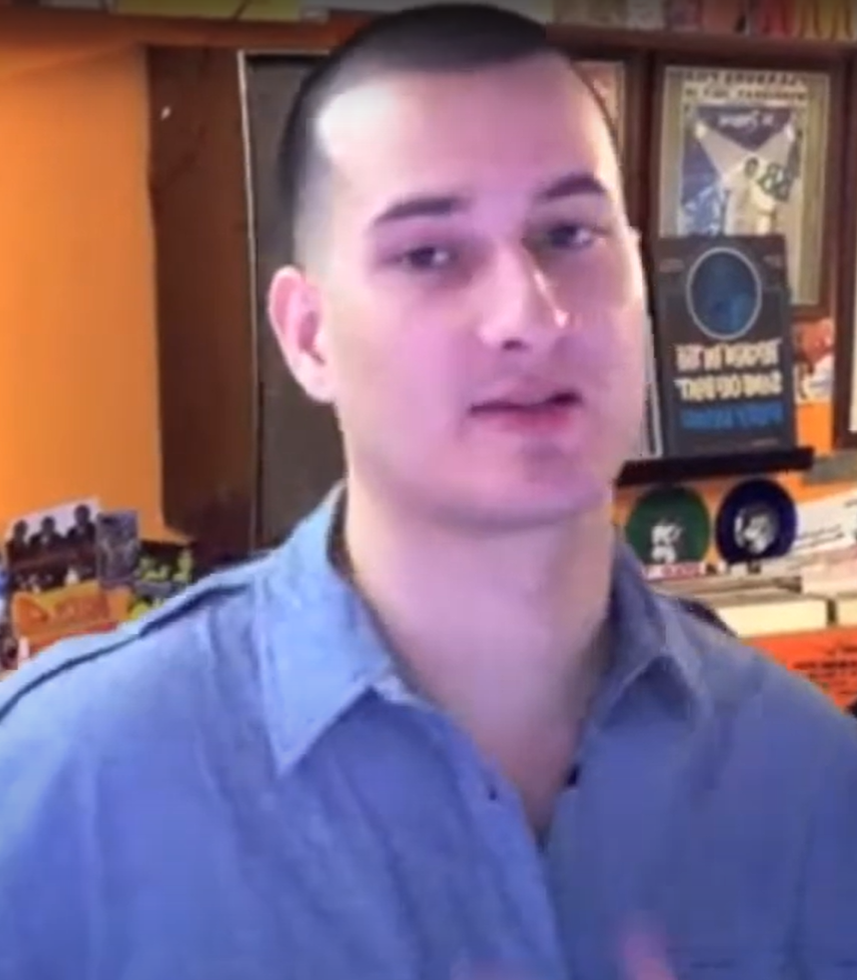
- Spanish beatmaker Big Size

Background information
- Born: David Garcia
- Origin: Madrid, Spain
- Genre: Hip hop
- Occupation: Hip hop producer
- Years active: 2005–present
- Label: Cookin Soul Records

Cookin' Soul is a group of rap producers and DJs from Valencia, Spain. In its early days, it was made up of Big Size, Milton, and Zock. Currently, Big Size is the only active member. The group is known for its productions on numerous tracks by MCs and rap groups around the world. They are also recognized for releasing a large number of mixtapes and albums. Producing work since around 2005, Cookin' Soul has developed a strong presence in the mixtape circuit in the US, according to El País.

== Biography ==
David Garcia, better known by his stage name Cookin' Soul or Big Size, was born in 1985 in Madrid, Spain into an Armenian-Catalan family. At the age of four, his family relocated to Valencia, a culturally rich city located on Spain’s southeastern coast where the Turia River meets the Mediterranean Sea. His musical journey began early, inspired by his mother's weekend sessions of James Brown and other classic tunes played on cassette tapes.

== Critical response ==
The Guardian gave a project they did a mixed review, indicating that "some of the mash-ups work magnificently...but several needed more time spent on them" than the single night allocated to it by the trio. Also in 2008, MTV mentioned "Public Speeding", a mashup of Jay-Z's "Public Service Announcement" and Coldplay's "High Speed", as an example of the "strangely compelling flow" of blending "worlds-apart sounds". In 2009, the trio released a tribute mixtape to Michael Jackson, with The Washington Post describing their blend of Jackson 5 and Lil Wayne on "I Want You Back" as "unexpectedly touching/weird." While the group's creation of Christmas themed rap album featuring MF Doom known as DOOM XMAS is considered a staple mark of a holiday rap album amongst underground hip hop fans (Doom's main audience)

== Discography ==
=== Albums ===
- The Experience Album (2011), with Diversidad (European project)
- Raw with Blanco & Nipsey Hussle (2012)
- Cookies & Cream with Blanco & Yukmouth (2012)
- Cookies (To be released)
- Cookin Bananas, with Mucho Muchacho
- DOOM XMAS (2019), with MF Doom (unofficial)

=== Mixtapes ===
- Lost Files Vol. 1 (unknown release date)
- The Remixes Vol. 1 (2005)
- Street's Most Wanted (Remixes Vol. 2) (2006)
- A.W.O.L. Remixes (2006), with AZ
- NY State of Mind: The 50 Cent, Jay-Z and Nas Remixes (2006)
- Billboard Gangsters (2007), Jay-Z vs Elvis
- Remixes Vol. 3 (Thinkin' Big) (2008)
- Hot Buttered Soul Isaac Hayes Tribute (2008)
- OJAYZIS (2008), Jay-Z vs Oasis
- Best of Both Coasts (2008), with Jay-Z, Game and DJ Haze
- Merry Little Xmas (Rap the Carols Edition) (2008)
- Night of the Living Dead Part I (2008), with DJ Whoo Kid. Notorious BIG
- 90s & My Heart's Broken (2009), with 50 Cent
- The Notorious B.I.G. Tribute (2009), with DJ Drama
- 1:00 A.M. & Rising (2009), with Nahright
- Tribute to the King of Pop (2009), Michael Jackson
- Night of the Living Dead Part II (2009), with DJ Whoo Kid, 2Pac
- The R.E.D. Album (2009), Game vs Jay-Z
- Big Dilla (Feb 7th Edition) (2010), Big Pun x J Dilla
- This Is Cookin Soul (2010), with DJ Hazime and DJ George
- Teddy Pendergrass Tribute (2010)
- Cookin Soulja Boy (2010), with Soulja Boy
- Thank Us Later (The Remix Album) (2010), with Drake
- History in the Making (Gangsta Grillz) (2010), with DJ Drama
- Night of the Living Dead Part III (2010), with DJ Whoo Kid. Big L vs Big Pun
- Bosscast (2010), with DJ Wilor
- The Date Tape (2010), with Chuuwee
- The Lost Tapes 1.5 (2010), with Don Cannon. Nas
- Stockin Stuffers Hood Xmas (2010), with Smif-n-Wessun
- Jet Life to the Next Life (2011), with Trademark da Skydiver, Young Roddy & Curren$y
- Jet Life to the Next Life: Instrumentals (2011)
- The Revolution Is Being Televised (2011), Gil Scott-Heron
- Summer Waves (2011)
- The Beat Tape Vol. 1 (2012)
- Iron Chef (2012), Fiend
- Summer Waves 2 (2012)
- Ready for Xmas (2012)
- Check Out Melodee (2012)
- Live En Concierto (2013)
- Summer Waves Vol.3 (2013)
- ACE (2014)
- The Drive In Theater (2014)
- SoulMatic (2014)
- Summer Waves Vol.4 (2014)
- Fastlife Vol.5 Audio Luxury with Gue (2026)
