= Currensy =

American rapper (born 1981)

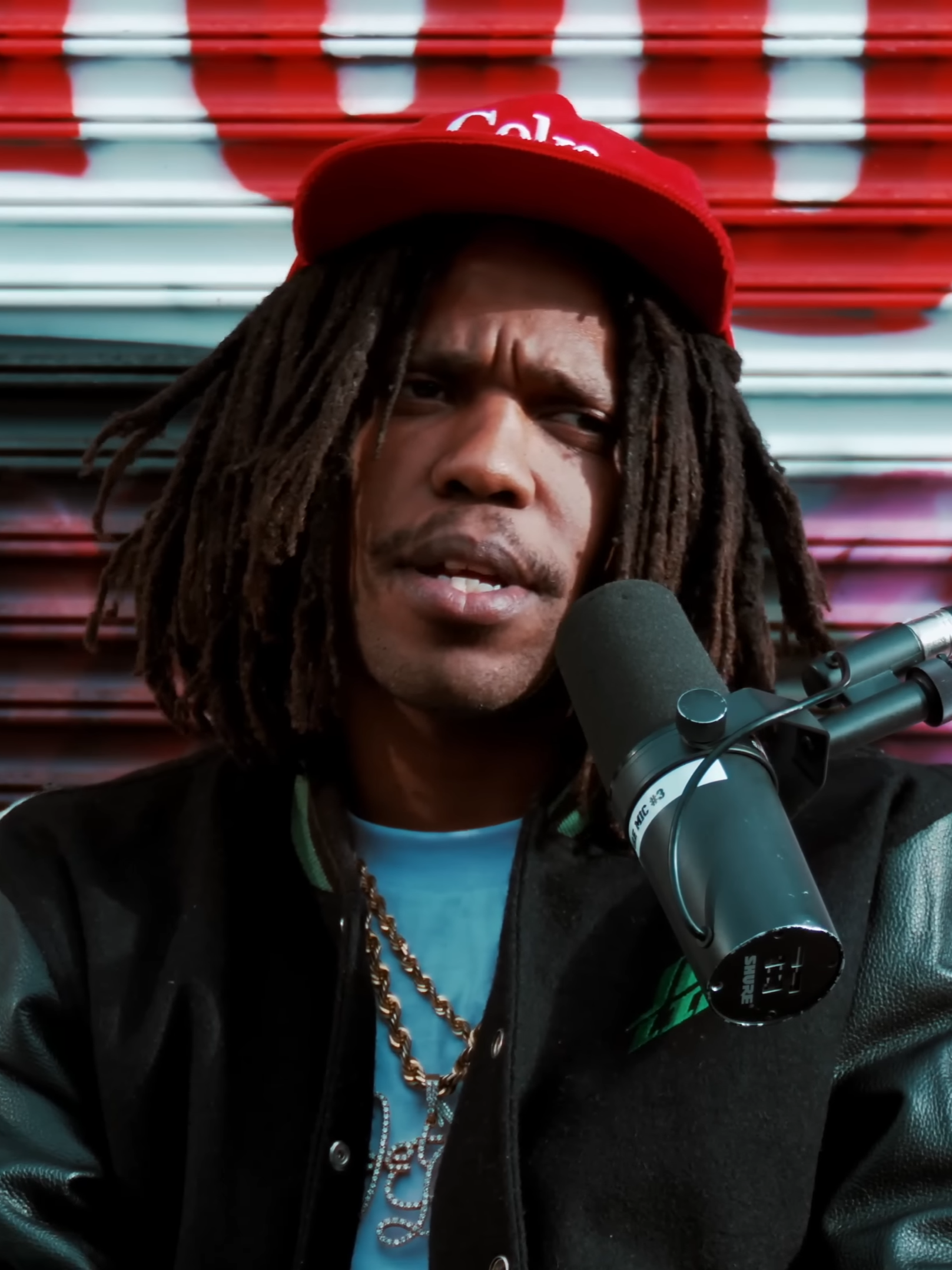
- Currensy in 2024

Background information
- Also known as: Spitta Andretti; Juke; Curren$y
- Born: Shante Scott Franklin; April 4, 1981 (age 45); New Orleans, Louisiana, U.S.
- Genre: Southern hip-hop
- Occupations: Rapper; songwriter; record executive
- Years active: 2002–present
- Labels: Jet Life; Atlantic (current); No Limit; Cash Money; Young Money; Universal Motown; DD172; Def Jam; Asylum; Warner Bros. (former)
- Member of: Jet Life
- Formerly of: 504 Boyz
- Website: currensyspitta.com

Shante Scott Franklin (born April 4, 1981), better known by his stage name Currensy (stylized as Curren$y), is an American rapper. Born and raised in New Orleans, Louisiana, he signed with the local record labels No Limit Records, Cash Money Records and Young Money Entertainment in the mid-2000s, but parted ways with both without any major releases. He signed with DD172 to release four albums before signing with Warner Records to release his fifth album and major label debut, Weekend at Burnie's (2011). In February of that year, he founded the record label Jet Life Recordings.

Currensy is perhaps best known for his 2015 single, "Bottom of the Bottle" (featuring Lil Wayne and August Alsina), which remains his sole entry on the Billboard Hot 100.

== Music career ==
=== 2002–2008: No Limit and Young Money ===
In 2002, Currensy was signed to Master P's No Limit Records and was a late addition to the 504 Boyz. The song "Get Back" by 504 Boyz, produced by Donald XL Robertson, was featured on the 2003 film Malibu's Most Wanted soundtrack. Currensy appeared on 5 songs in Master P's Good Side, Bad Side album. Even though he was signed with No Limit, he represented C-Murder's TRU label. Currensy has several songs with C-Murder, and was featured on the late Soulja Slim's album, Years Later (2002).

In 2004, Currensy signed with Cash Money Records and Lil Wayne's Young Money Entertainment. He was featured on Lil Wayne's mixtape Dedication 2, The Suffix and several unreleased songs while with Young Money. He released a mixtape entitled Welcome Back in 2004. He was featured in Lil Wayne's "Grown Man" on Tha Carter II. While still at Young Money, Currensy created Fly Society with skateboarder Terry Kennedy, first as a clothing company, then expanding to release music. He released the song, "Where da Cash At" as the lead single for his Young Money debut, Music To Fly To, in 2006. In 2007, another mixtape was released entitled Life at 30,000 Feet. He remained with Young Money until late 2007. In 2008, Currensy released Independence Day, his first project after leaving Young Money and the first of seven mixtapes to be released that year while he struck out as an independent artist.

=== 2009–2010: This Ain't No Mixtape, Jet Files and Pilot Talk ===
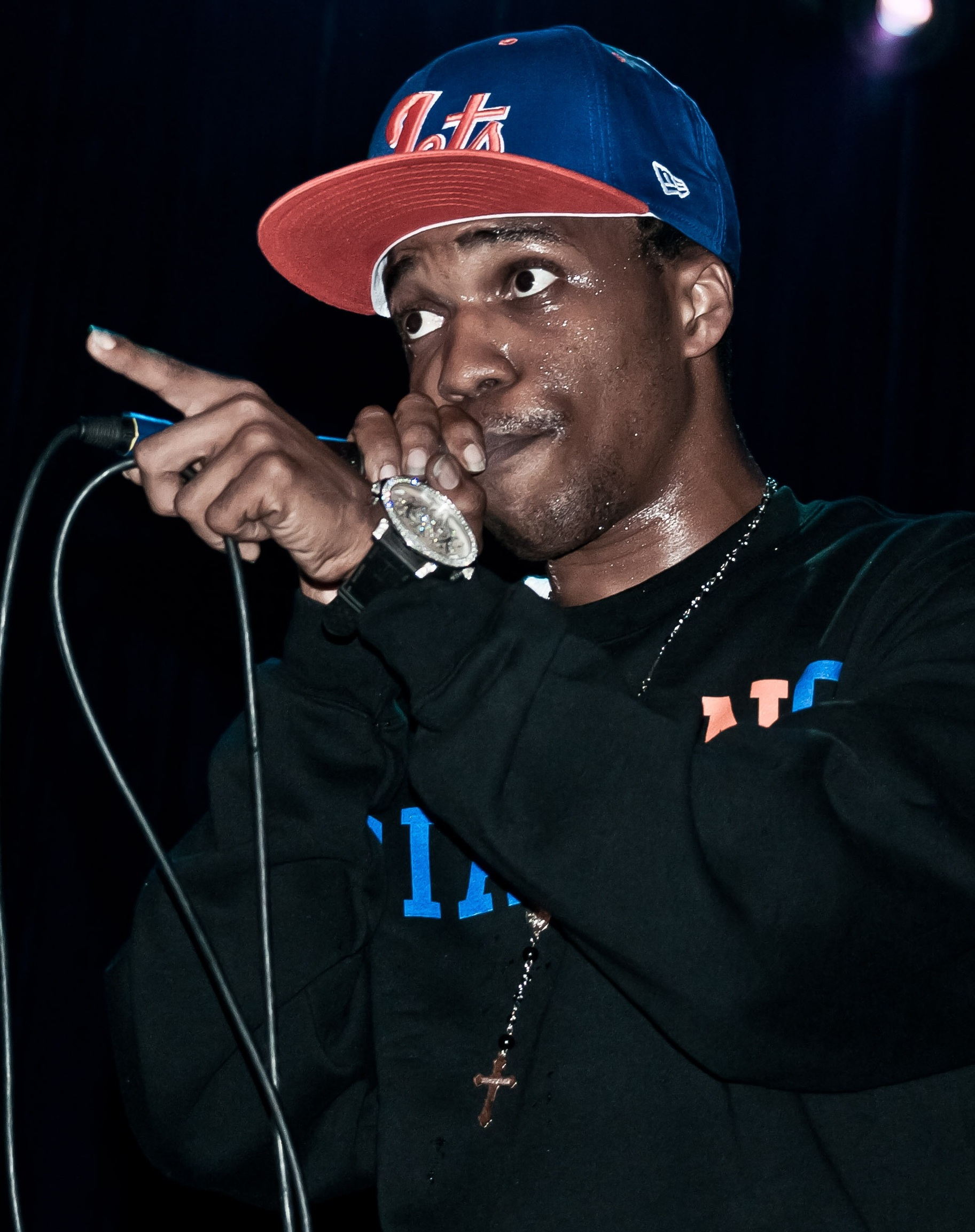
Currensy performing in 2010

Currensy signed with Amalgam Digital to release his debut album, This Ain't No Mixtape, in 2009. This album was entirely produced by Monsta Beatz. Currensy was also selected to XXL magazine's annual "Freshman Class" list, and released his second album, Jet Files, through Amalgam Digital that same year. Amalgam Digital released physical copies of This Ain't No Mixtape and Jet Files on May 31, 2010.

Currensy's third album, Pilot Talk, was released on July 13, 2010. The album featured guest appearances by Snoop Dogg, Big K.R.I.T. and Mos Def, amongst others, with most of the songs produced by Ski Beatz. Prior to the album's release, there was news of Pilot Talk being released under a newly relaunched Roc-A-Fella Records. However, Currensy stated in interviews with both XXL and Complex Magazine that the album would be released under Damon Dash's DD172 record label division, BluRoc Records and distributed through Def Jam Recordings. Currensy made numerous appearances on labelmate Ski Beatz' debut studio album, 24 Hour Karate School, which was released on September 21, 2010.

=== 2010–2011: Pilot Talk II and Weekend at Burnie's ===
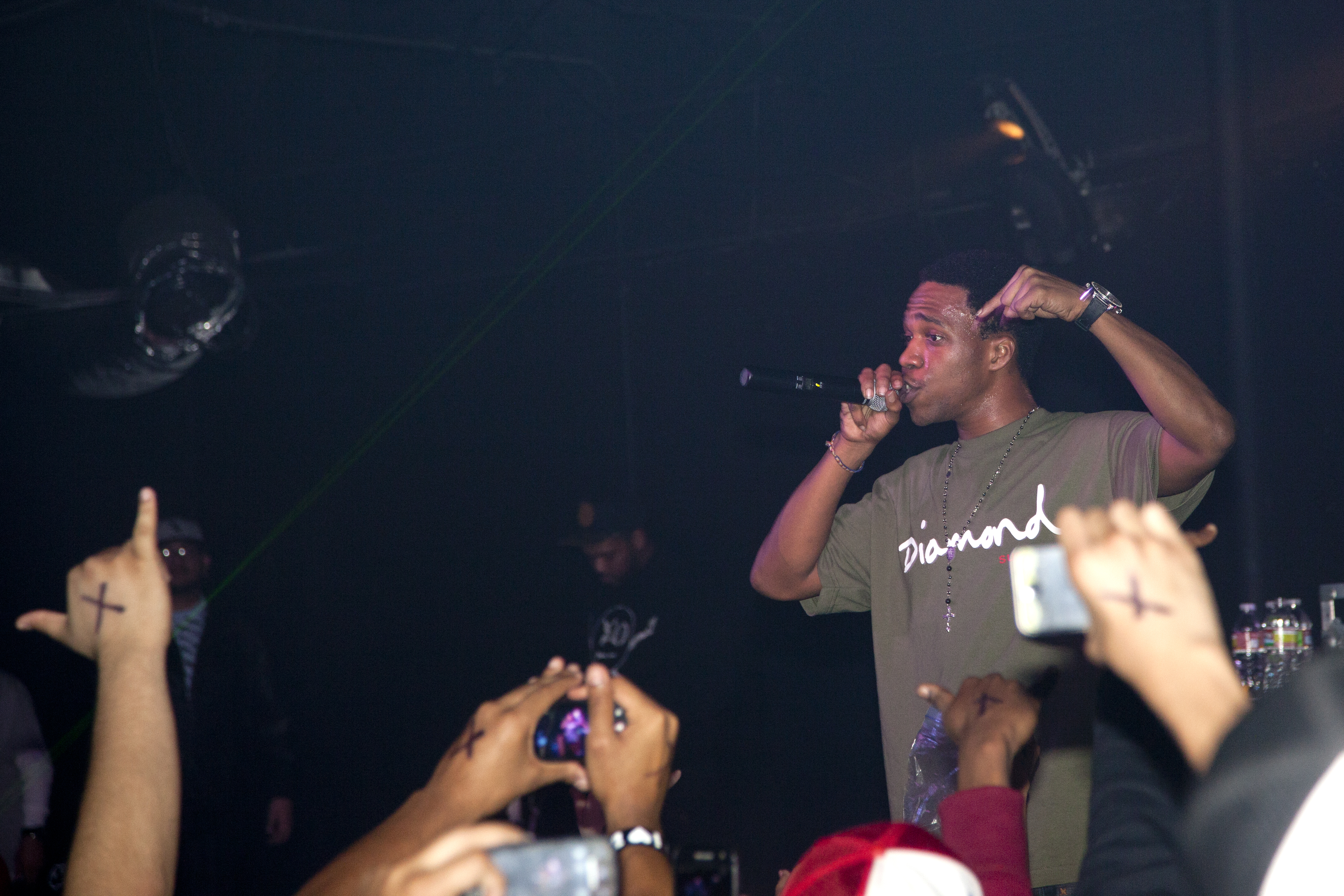
Currensy performing in 2010

Currensy's fourth album, Pilot Talk II, was released on November 22, 2010, which featured Fiend and Raekwon, among others, with many of the songs produced by Ski Beatz. 2010 also saw the release of mixtape Smokee Robinson with DJ Don Cannon.

On February 1, 2011, it was announced that Currensy signed a label deal with Warner Bros. Records for his imprint, Jet Life Recordings. Covert Coup was his first project on his Jet Life Recordings imprint under Warner Bros. Released for free via Currensy's official website on April 20, the album contains ten songs completely produced by The Alchemist. He released a mixtape, Weekend at Burnie's on June 28, 2011, featuring his Jet Life anthem "#JetsGo", which was produced by Rahki. The rest of the mixtape was produced by frequent collaborator Monsta Beatz. In 2011, Currensy and his Jet Life crew released the album Jet World Order, under Jets International / iHipHop. Every track on this album features Young Roddy and Trademark da Skydiver. Frequent collaborators of Currensy are also featured on this album, including Smoke DZA, The Cool Kids' Mikey Rocks, Cornerboy P, Fiend, Street Wiz, and Nesby Phips. Currensy himself appears on three tracks.

=== 2012–2013: The Stoned Immaculate and Live in Concert ===
On November 10, 2011, Currensy announced through Twitter the release of a new album. Muscle Car Chronicles, a two-disc set, was released on February 14, 2012. Currensy also planned on releasing Pilot Talk III in 2013, and mentioned the possibility of it being a free album. In February 2012, Currensy released the EP Here..., and a few days later released another EP #The1st28 with Styles P.

On April 21, 2012, the track listing for The Stoned Immaculate was released. In July 2012, Currensy released the EP featuring all production by Harry Fraud, Cigarette Boats. On October 31, 2012, he released the mixtape Priest Andretti.

He released a tape with Wiz Khalifa, titled Live in Concert. In November 2012 Currensy gave an update on his and Wiz Khalifa's mixtape Live in Concert saying its release is being held up by sample issues. In January 2013, Currensy said that due to these same legal issues, the mixtape would likely become a retail album. It was released as an iTunes only EP on April 20, 2013.

On February 3, 2013, Currensy released his latest mixtape New Jet City with guest appearances from Wiz Khalifa, French Montana, Jadakiss, Juvenile, Juicy J, Trinidad James and Rick Ross among others.

On October 30, 2013, Currensy released The Stage EP with Smoke DZA and Harry Fraud.

=== 2014–present: The Drive In Theatre and Pilot Talk III ===
Currensy announced a new mixtape, The Drive In Theatre, in January 2014. He followed up on January 26, 2014, with the release of a new single, "Godfather 4" featuring Action Bronson. On February 4, 2014, Currensy took to Twitter to announce a release date for The Drive In Theatre, it was released on February 14, 2014.

On January 17, 2013, Currensy announced on Twitter that he and Ski Beatz began the process of making Pilot Talk III. The album has been in development ever since, with Currensy, in various interviews, naming possible guest appearances from Lil Boosie, Lil Wayne, Wiz Khalifa, Ab-Soul, French Montana, Action Bronson, Jadakiss, Styles P, and Riff Raff, with a majority of the production handled by Ski Beatz, along with some production from Cool & Dre. On January 19, 2015, Currensy posted the album's possible artwork on his Instagram account, created by David Barnett, who was also responsible for the artwork of the first two Pilot Talk albums. On March 1, 2015, DJ Skee released the first single "Alert" featuring Styles P and produced by Ski Beatz. On March 15, 2015, Currensy announced that he'll be releasing Pilot Talk III exclusively on a $100 USB drive, "bundled with a Jet Life shirt and Pilot Talk 3 look book" with accompanying music videos. However, he also hinted at the album may be up for streaming. The bundle was available for pre-order on the Jet Life website, which also confirmed that it will not be released on iTunes. It was set for release on April 4, 2015. He released 12 mixtapes in 2016.

In June 2023, Currensy released Vices, a joint album with producer Harry Fraud.

== Jet Life Recordings ==
On February 1, 2011, Currensy started his imprint Jet Life Recordings in New Orleans.

== Pilot Talk lawsuit ==
In March 2012, news surfaced of legal action being taken against Damon Dash by Currensy. In the lawsuit, the rapper claimed that he never legally signed to Dash's DD172 label, and the record executive released the pair of albums (Pilot Talk I and Pilot Talk II) as well as Muscle Car Chronicles without authorization. Currensy demanded that Dash immediately stop releasing his music for profit, and pay $1.5 million in damages. On October 6, 2015, Currensy was awarded $3 million in settlement stemming from the 2012 lawsuit against Dash for releasing material of his music without his consent.

== Discography ==
Studio albums

- This Ain't No Mixtape (2009)
- Jet Files (2009)
- Pilot Talk (2010)
- Pilot Talk II (2010)
- Weekend at Burnie's (2011)
- The Stoned Immaculate (2012)
- Pilot Talk III (2015)
- Canal Street Confidential (2015)
- Back at Burnie's (2019)
- Collection Agency (2021)
- Still Stoned On Ocean (2021)
- Pilot Talk IV (2021)

Collaboration albums

- How Fly (with Wiz Khalifa) (2009)
- Covert Coup (with The Alchemist) (2011)
- Covert Coup (Instrumentals) (with The Alchemist) (2011)
- Jet Life to the Next Life (with Jet Life & Cookin’ Soul) (2011)
- Jet Life to the Next Life (Instrumentals) (with Jet Life & Cookin’ Soul) (2011)
- Jet World Order (with Jet Life) (2011)
- Muscle Car Chronicles (with Sean O'Connell) (2012)
- Cigarette Boats (with Harry Fraud) (2012)
- Jet World Order 2 (with Jet Life) (2012)
- #The1st28 (with Styles P) (2012)
- 3 Piece Set (A Closed Session) (with Young Roddy) (2012)
- Live in Concert (with Wiz Khalifa) (2013)
- The Stage (with Harry Fraud & Smoke DZA) (2013)
- Bales (with Young Roddy) (2013)
- Red Eye Mixtape (with Jet Life) (2013)
- Audio D (with Jet Life) (2014)
- Organized Crime (with Jet Life) (2014)
- World Wide Hustlers (with Jet Life) (2014)
- The Carrollton Heist (with The Alchemist) (2016)
- The Carrollton Heist (Remixed) (with The Alchemist) (2016)
- Bourbon Street Secrets (with Purps On The Beat) (2016)
- The Owners Manual (with Cool & Dre) (2016)
- Revolver (with Sledgren) (2016)
- Jet Life All Stars (with Jet Life) (2017)
- The Jetlanta (with Jet Life) (2017)
- The Motivational Speech (with Lex Luger) (2017)
- The Marina (with Harry Fraud) (2018)
- Fetti (with Freddie Gibbs & The Alchemist) (2018)
- 2009 (with Wiz Khalifa) (2019)
- Gran Turismo (with Statik Selektah) (2019)
- Gran Turismo (Instrumentals) (with Statik Selektah) (2019)
- Pheno Grigio (with Berner) (2019)
- Umbrella Symphony (with Jay Worthy & LNDN DRGS) (2019)
- Plan of Attack (with Trademark da Skydiver & Young Roddy) (2019)
- Prestige Worldwide (with Smoke DZA) (2019)
- The Tonite Show With Curren$y (with DJ Fresh) (2020)
- The Green Tape (with Cardo Got Wings) (2020)
- The Tonite Show With Curren$y (Deluxe) (with DJ Fresh) (2020)
- Spring Clean (with Fuse) (2020)
- Smokin' Potnas (with Fendi P) (2020)
- The OutRunners (with Harry Fraud) (2020)
- The Director's Cut (with Harry Fraud) (2020)
- Bonus Footage (with Harry Fraud) (2020)
- Welcome to Jet Life Recordings (with Jet Life) (2020)
- Land Air Sea (with Cash Fargo) (2021)
- Welcome to Jet Life Recordings 2 (with Jet Life) (2021)
- Highest in Charge (with Trauma Tone) (2021)
- Matching Rolexes (with Kino Beats) (2021)
- Regatta (with Harry Fraud) (2021)
- Land Air Sea (Chopped Not Slopped) (with Cash Fargo & OG Ron C) (2022)
- Continuance (with The Alchemist) (2022)
- Spring Clean 2 (with Fuse) (2022)
- Spring Clean 2 (Deluxe) (with Fuse) (2022)
- Vices (with Harry Fraud) (2023)
- Highway 600 (with Trauma Tone) (2023)
- For Motivational Use (with Jermaine Dupri) (2023)
- Highway 600 (Deluxe) (with Trauma Tone) (2024)
- Radioactive (with Monstabeatz) (2024)
- Radioactive (Chopped Not Slopped) (with Monstabeatz & OG Ron C) (2024)
- The Tonite Show The Sequel (with DJ Fresh) (2024)
- The Encore (with DJ Fresh) (2024)
- Never Catch Us (with Harry Fraud) (2025)
- The Tonite Show Trilogy (with DJ Fresh) (2025)
- A Night in San Diego (with Lil Moe) (2025)
- The Curren$y Files (with Cookin’ Soul) (2026)
- Spiral Staircases (with Larry June & The Alchemist) (2026)
- Roofless Records for Drop Tops: Disc 1 (with Wiz Khalifa & Cardo Got Wings) (2026)
- Roofless Records for Drop Tops: Disc 2 (with Wiz Khalifa & Harry Fraud) (2026)
- Off To The Races (with Harry Fraud) (2026)

== Tours ==
Headlining

- Jet Life Tour: Direct Flight (2012)
- Canal Street Confidential Tour (2015)
- Pilot Talk Trilogy Tour (2017)
- 4:20 Tour (2025)
- The Winners Circle Tour (2026)

Co-headlining

- The Smokers Club (2011) (with Smoke DZA, Big K.R.I.T., and Method Man)
- 2009 Tour (2019) (with Wiz Khalifa)
