= Trademark da Skydiver =

American rapper

Background information
- Also known as: Flamingo Barnes, Super Villain
- Born: February 27, 1985 (age 41); New Orleans, Louisiana, U.S.
- Genre: Hip hop
- Occupation: Rapper
- Years active: 2009–present
- Labels: The Barnes Corp., iHipHop Distribution, Jet Life Productions, Warner Bros
- Website: flamingobarnes.com

Alex Washington (born February 27, 1987), better known by his stage name Trademark da Skydiver, is an American rapper. He was a member of the hip-hop group Jet Life and also performs under the aliases "Super Villain" and "Flamingo Barnes".

== History ==
Trademark da Skydiver was born and raised in New Orleans, Louisiana. He was introduced to hip-hop when he was eight years old by an older cousin who brought back a variety of music from his travels in the Navy. His cousin exposed him to all types of hip-hop including the Wu-Tang Clan. While constantly hearing Cash Money and No Limit Records in New Orleans, Trademark also became heavily influenced by the New York City sound and the Wu-Tang Clan entire discography, particularly Method Man's album Tical 2000: Judgment Day. After hearing that album, Trademark was inspired and began his rap career.

Two of Trademark's childhood friends were the rappers Curren$y and Young Roddy. Early on in his career, a mutual friend brought Trademark into a studio session and Curren$y was there. Curren$y got him to appear on a friend's mixtape and from there, they both realized that their styles meshed well and continued to work in tandem on a variety of projects. Soon after that studio day, they formed Jet Life.

Jet Life grew to include (at different points) Trademark da Skydiver, Curren$y, Young Roddy, Corner Boy P, T.Y., Fiend, Street Wiz, Marygold, and producer Monsta Beatz. Trademark played a prominent role in the conception and execution of Jet Life's "Jet World Order" Series which were both released via Jet Life's partnership with iHipHop Distribution.

In 2009, he began a three part series under the name "Super Villain." The name originated from his experiences as a young person being told what he could and couldn't do, who he should be and shouldn't be. Thus, he created the "Super Villain" alias as a way to rebel against those boundaries. By creating an all-powerful persona, he was able to create a new style for this series that showcased his diversity and skill as a rapper.

Trademark da Skydiver released "Flamingo Barnes" in 2012 and then released "Flamingo Barnes 2: Mingo Royale" in 2013. After working for a few years with the Jet Life crew, Trademark decided to show his versatility and individual value as a rapper by creating the Flamingo Barnes project and subsequent record label with the same name. The two albums have been described as having trap music production with nods to the ASAP Mob sound but Trademark defines the style as just simply, "Flamingo Barnes."

Trademark was recently named an "Artist to Watch" on iTunes hip-hop homepage. His music video for "Rite Nah" featuring Dizzy Wright premiered on BET's 106 & Park and is also in rotation on MTV Jams.

== Discography ==
=== Albums ===
- "Super Villain Issue #1" (2009)
- "Super Villain Issue #2" (2010)
- "Super Villain Issue #3: Reign Supreme" (2010)
- "Flamingo Barnes" (2012)
- "Flamingo Barnes 2: Mingo Royale" (2013)
- "Issue 4: Return of the Super Villain" (2014)

=== Collaborative albums ===
- Family Business (with Young Roddy) (2016)
- Plan of Attack (with Curren$y & Young Roddy) (2019)

=== Singles ===
- "Rite Nah" (feat. Dizzy Wright) (2013)
- "1,000 Pounds" (feat. Bodega Bamz) (2013)

=== Guest appearances ===
- Curren$y – "LOL" from "This Ain't No Mixtape" LP (2009)
- Fortunate Ones – "The Toast" Single (2010)
- Chevy Woods – "Smoke Two" from "Pilot Shit" LP (2010)
- Curren$y – "Roasted" from "Pilot Talk" LP (2010)
- Jet Life – "Jet World Order" LP (2011)
- Curren$y – "Still" from "Weekend at Burnie's" LP (2011)
- Sir Michael Rocks – "Livin' It Up" from "The Rocks Report" LP (2011)
- Fortunate Ones – "Showboats" Single (2011)
- Smoke DZA – "Overhigh" from Rolling Stoned LP (2011)
- Jet Life – "Jet Life to the Next Life" LP (2011)
- Curren$y & The Jets – "1st Place" Single (2011)
- Jet Life – "Jet World Order 2" LP (2012)
- Curren$y – "Armoire" from "The Stoned Immaculate" LP (2012)
- Corner Boy P – "Fade Away Pt. 2" from "Money Neva Sleep 2" LP (2012)
- Corner Boy P – "Keep It G" from "Fendi P 2" LP (2012)
- Corner Boy P – "Talkin' Shit" from "Fendi P 2" LP (2012)
- Kashflow Da God – "Kush" Single (2012)
- Fiend & Cookin' Soul – "Ol Habits" from "Iron Chef" LP (2012)
- Curren$y – "Armoire" from "The Stoned Immaculate" LP (2012)
- Young Roddy – "Landing Strip" from "Good Sense" LP (2012)
- Corner Boy P – "Fade Away" from "Money Neva Sleep" LP (2012)
- Curren$y – "Contacts" from "Priest Andretti" LP (2012)
- Curren$y – "Conference Call" from "Here..." LP(2012)
- Skibeatz – "Living It Up" from "24 Hour Karate School: Twilight" LP (2012)
- Flik Melone & Apitight – "Acquainted" from "The Wordplay" LP (2013)
- Young Roddy – "You Know" from "Good Sense II" LP (2013)
- Spitta Andretti – "Coolie in the Cut" from "New Jet City" LP (2013)
- Spitta Andretti – "Payroll" from "The Drive In Theatre" LP (2014)
- Minty Burns – "Shisha Monster" Single (2014)
