= Young Roddy =

American rapper

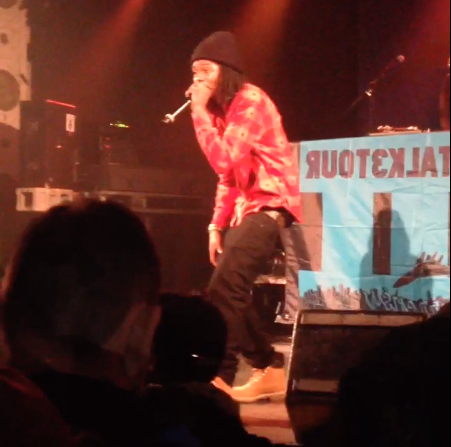
- Young Roddy performing in August 2015.

Background information
- Also known as: Route the Ruler, Roddy
- Born: Roderick Brisco; September 20, 1986 (age 39); Kenner, Louisiana, U.S.
- Genres: Hip hop
- Occupation: Rapper
- Years active: 2007–present
- Labels: iHipHop; Jet Life

Roderick Brisco (born September 20, 1986), better known by his stage name Young Roddy (or simply Roddy), is an American rapper signed to Jet Life Recordings and iHipHop Distribution.

== Early life ==
Young Roddy was born and raised in Kenner, Louisiana, New Orleans Metropolitan Area in Jefferson Parish.

Growing up, Roddy was an avid basketball player and aspired to play professionally. After Hurricane Katrina in 2005, Roddy's mother, with whom he lived at the time, moved to Texas. Roddy did not want to leave New Orleans, however, and moved in with a friend who made beats and had a home studio. At this time, Roddy began to freestyle in cyphers with his friends. Roddy's friends were impressed by his skills, encouraged him to continue freestyling for them, and eventually suggested that he invest more time in his music. Despite this positive feedback and Roddy's genuine passion for music, he still did not see rap as a serious pursuit. Although he enjoyed freestyling, he was not recording music and resisted his cousin's repeated attempts to get him in the studio. Roddy was only goaded into visiting the studio when his cousin told him that Young Money would be recording in the same space. Roddy would go on to meet Curren$y at this studio. After hearing Roddy freestyle, Curren$y asked Roddy to join a new group that he was assembling and the two began to collaborate.

== Career ==
=== 2007–present ===
In 2007, Young Roddy appeared on two songs, "Money Gone To My Head" and "Lysol," from Curren$y's mixtape Life At 30,000 Feet. The following year, Roddy joined Curren$y again on "Passport Sports" from the mixtape Independence Day. Roddy would go on to appear on each of the next six mixtapes that Curren$y released in 2008, as well as on his debut studio album in 2009.

By this time, the Jet Life collective had formed, consisting of (at different points) Young Roddy, Curren$y, Trademark Da Skydiver, Corner Boy P, T.Y., Fiend, Street Wiz, Le$, Smoke DZA, Nesby Phips, Marygold, and producer Monsta Beatz. In March 2011, Young Roddy and Trademark Da Skydiver collaborated on the first project from members of the Jet Life collective, the mixtape Jet Life To The Next Life. Later that year, Roddy appeared on Jet Life's debut album, Jet World Order, and in 2012, on Jet Life's second studio album, Jet World Order 2.

Roddy embarked on his solo career in 2012, releasing the first installment of the Good Sense mixtape series. In 2013, he followed up with Good Sense 2, and in 2014, released both Route the Ruler and Legal Dealing.

The Kenner Loop, Young Roddy's debut studio album, was released on December 4, 2015, via iHipHop Distribution.

Roddy moved on without Jet Life Recordings and started Good Sense Records and have distribution ties with BabyGrande. The distribution deal became active since 2018 and on September 24, 2021, Young Roddy had released God Family Money, his latest LP.

== Discography ==
=== Studio albums ===
- The Kenner Loop (2015)
- Family Business (with Trademark da Skydiver) (2016)
- Plan of Attack (with Curren$y & Trademark da Skydiver) (2019)
- Never Question God (2022)

=== Mixtapes ===
- Good Sense (2012)
- Good Sense 2 (2013)
- Route the Ruler (2014)
- Good Sense 3 (2016)
- Area 31 (2016)

=== Extended plays ===
- Legal Dealing (2014)
- Glenwood (2017)
- Uncommon (2018)
- God Family Money (2021)

=== Collaborative mixtapes ===
- Bales (with Curren$y) (2013)
- Bendin' Corners (with T.Y) (2015)
- Hood Gospel (with Jamaal) (2017)
- Face The World (with GoodSense Family) (2018)
- Hoodlum (with GoodSense Family) (2018)
- Hood Gospel 2 (with Jamaal) (2018)
