= Ski Beatz production discography =

The following songs were produced by Ski Beatz.

== 1990 ==
=== Bizzie Boyz – Droppin' It ===
1. "For Those Who Slept"
2. "Pump Up the House"
3. "Too Deep for the Mortal Mind"
4. "Droppin It"
5. "Closa"
6. "Hold the Lafta"
7. "Say When"
8. "If You Don't Want Me"
9. "I Think I'm in Love"
10. "Use Your Imagination"
11. "Total Madness"
12. "So Many Memories"
13. "This Is How It Should Be Done"
14. "Mission Accomplished"
15. "Patty Porno"
16. "Turntable Scientist"

== 1991 ==
=== Supreme Nyborn – Style ===
1. "Style" {produced with Supreme Nyborn}

== 1992 ==
=== Original Flavor – This Is How It Is ===
1. "This Is How It Is"
2. "When I Make It"
3. "Best Friend's Girl"
4. "Way wit Words"
5. "Kick the Butta"
6. "Waitin' 4 My Break"
7. "Handle the Technique"
8. "Give 'Em Some Wrek"
9. "Gumdrops"
10. "I Like It (Freestyle)"
11. "Brain Storm"
12. "Swingin'"
13. "Here We Go"

=== Papa San – Rough Cut ===
- 7. "Ram Dance Man" (produced with Clark Kent)

== 1993 ==
=== Father MC – Sex Is Law ===
- 7. "Ain't Nuttin but a Party"
- 10. "The Wiggle" (produced with Clark Kent)

=== Nerissa – Nerissa ===
- 14. "In the Rain" (Remix) [feat. Ski Beatz] (produced with Clark Kent)

== 1994 ==
=== A.D.O.R. – The Concrete ===
- 10. From the Concrete

=== Original Flavor – Beyond Flavor ===
1. "Intro"
2. "Can I Get Open (feat. Jigga)"
3. "Beyond Flavor"
4. "Old School Skit"
5. "Watchawant"
6. "Stick It Where the Sun Don't Shine"
7. "Blowin' Up the Spot"
8. "Hit (feat. the Sauceman)"
9. "Nigga Code" (feat. Dame Dash)
10. "Many Styles (feat. the Jiggaman)"
11. "All That"
12. "Shut Up & Menage"
13. "Here We Go (Fuck It Up)"
14. "Keep On (Searching)"
15. "Shoutouts"

00. "All That" (Remix)

=== Kirk – Makin' Moves ===
- 10. "Uptown Style" (featuring Ski Beatz)

=== Jay-Z – In My Lifetime (VLS) ===
- 01. "In My Lifetime"

== 1995 ==
=== Addis Black Widow – Innocent 12" ===
- A1. "Innocent" {co-produced by Addis Black Widow}

=== Main One – Birth of the Ghetto Child ===
- A5. "Check da Skillz"
- B4. "Whip Appeal"

=== Shamus – Big Willie Style / Try 2C Loot 12" ===
- A1. "Big Willie Style"
- B1. "Try 2C Loot" (feat. Ski Beatz)

=== Camp Lo – Coolie High 12" ===
- A1. "Coolie High" {co-produced by Jocko}
- B1. "World Heist (Street mix)" (feat. Jungle Brown)
- C4. "Coolie High Paradise Remix"

=== Various Artists – Clockers (soundtrack) ===
- 09. Illa Killa – Strictly Difficult

=== Cover the Child of Destruction – Underground Flow 12" ===
- B1. "Underground Flow" (Remix)

=== AZ – Doe or Die ===
- 11. "Your World Don't Stop"

=== Bahamadia - Uknowhowwedu 12" ===
- A3. "Uknowhowwedu (Remix)" [feat. Nonchalant]

== 1996 ==
=== Bahamadia – Kollage ===
- 07. "Uknowhowwedu" (produced with DJ Redhanded)

=== China – Time! CDS ===
- A4. "Time" (China Ski Slopes)

=== C.O.D. Crew - Come On, Come On CDS ===
- A1. "Come On, Come On" feat. Ski Beatz

=== Cover the Child of Destruction – Time Is Running Out / I'm Trapped 12" ===
- B1. "I'm Trapped"

=== Jay-Z – Reasonable Doubt ===
- 02. "Politics As Usual"
- 04. "Dead Presidents II"
- 05. "Feelin' It" (feat. Mecca)
- 07. "22 Two's"

=== – Dead Presidents 12" ===
- A1. "Dead Presidents"

=== Krumbsnatcha – Mental Orgasm / Gangsta Disease 12" ===
- A1. "Mental Orgasm"
- B1. "Gangsta Disease"

=== Lil' Kim – Hard Core ===
- 04. "Spend a Little Doe"

=== Various Artists - The Great White Hype (soundtrack) ===
- 06. "Coolie High" - Camp Lo {co-produced by Jocko}

=== Young Zee – Musical Meltdown ===
released in 2015

- 02. "Don't Fuck with New Jersey"
- 03. "Problems"
- 10. "Juice (feat. Rah Digga)"
- 14. "Electric Chair (feat. D.U. & Pacewon)"

== 1997 ==
=== Camp Lo – Uptown Saturday Night ===
1. "Krystal Karrington"
2. "Luchini AKA This Is It"
3. "Park Joint"
4. "Killin' 'Em Softly"
5. "Sparkle"
6. "Black Connection"
7. "Swing (feat. Butterfly)"
8. "Rockin' It AKA Spanish Harlem"
9. "Say Word (feat. Jungle Brown)"
10. "Negro League (feat. Bones and Karachi R.A.W.)"
11. "Nicky Barnes AKA It's Alright (feat. Jungle Brown)"
12. "Black Nostaljack AKA Come On" {co-produced by Ill Will Fulton}
13. "Coolie High" {co-produced by Jocko}
14. "Sparkle (Mr. Midnight Mix)" (produced with Jocko)

=== Jungle Brown – I Got the World Spinnin' / Grace Under Fire CDS ===
- A1. "I Got the World Spinnin'"

=== Kirk – Everyday / Suspect CDS ===
- A1. "Everyday"
- B1. "Suspect"

=== Various Artists – Sprung (soundtrack) ===
- 01. "Who You Wit" – Jay-Z

=== Jay-Z – In My Lifetime, Vol. 1 ===
- 05. "Streets Is Watching"
- 09. "Who You Wit II"

=== Funkdoobiest – The Troubleshooters ===
- 11. "Natural Fun" (feat. Ski Beatz & Krumbsnatcha)

=== Richie Thumbs – Thumbs Up! / When Ya Hot, Ya Hot! CDS ===
- A1. "Thumbs Up! (feat. Mo Money & the Lox)"
- B1. "When Ya Hot, Ya Hot!" (feat. Ski Beatz)

=== Ray J – Everything You Want 12" ===
- A1. "Everything You Want (Roc-a-Blok Remix)" [feat. Camp Lo]

== 1998 ==
=== Lord Tariq and Peter Gunz – Make It Reign ===
- 16. "Cross Bronx Expressway (feat. Big Pun & Fat Joe)

=== Pacewon – I Declare War (VLS) ===
- A1. "I Declare War"
- B1. "Step Up" (co-produced by Ken Sport)

=== Supreme NYborn – All Day All Night (CDS) ===
- B1. "Never Say Never"

=== Fat Joe – Don Cartagena ===
- 7. "John Blaze" (feat. Big Pun, Jadakiss, Nas and Raekwon)

=== Sporty Thievz – Street Cinema ===
- 2. "The Spot"
- 3. "Fedz"
- 4. "Freeks"
- 5. "Spy Hunter" (produced with Kirk)
- 6. Like Father, Like Son"
- 7. "Raw Footage" (feat. Tragedy Khadafi)"
- 9. "Cheapskate (You Ain't Gettin' Nada)"
- 10. "Angel" (produced with Kirk)
- 13. "Ready" (feat. Peter Gunz)
- 15. "Street Cinema"
- 00. "Cheapskate (Even Cheaper Remix) [feat. Mocha]

== 2000 ==
=== K.T. – Why I Hustle ===
- 14. "Xtra"

=== Nature – For All Seasons ===
- 5. "The Ultimate High" (feat. Nas)

=== Outsidaz – Night Life ===
- 1. "Don't Look Now"
- 2. "The Rah Rah"

=== Sporty Thievz – Street Cinema 2 12" ===
- B1. "Enemies of Hate"

== 2001 ==
=== Foxy Brown – Broken Silence ===
- 05. The Letter (feat. Ron Isley)
- 11. 'Bout My Paper (feat. Mystikal)

=== Jay-Z – Jay-Z: Unplugged ===
- 13. People Talking {Bonus Track}

== 2002 ==
=== Angie Martinez – Animal House ===
- 10. "Fucked Up Situation" (feat. Tony Sunshine)

=== Camp Lo – Let's Do It Again ===
- 01. "Gotcha"
- 02. "Let's Do It Again"
- 03. "Glow"
- 05. "How U Walkin'"
- 06. "Black Connect II"
- 07. "Soul Train"
- 08. "Gorilla Pimp"
- 09. "China Soul"
- 10. "Macadame"
- 11. "Turbo Ozone"
- 12. "Carnival 4 Sha"

=== Camp Lo – Troubleman 12" ===
- B1. Cookers

=== Deadly Venoms – Still Standing ===
- 08. "All Nighter"

=== Pacewon – Won ===
- 03. "Won"
- 04. "World Renown"
- 05. "Money Hungry"
- 06. "Thievz Theme" {co-produced by Sonny Willis}
- 07. "Bring It Out of Me" (feat. Richie Thumbs)
- 08. "I Declare War"
- 12. "Step Up" {co-produced by Ken Sport}
- 14. "Fresh"
- 15. "No Retreat"
- 16. "Reckless"
- 17. "Cowboys & Westerns"
- 18. "Rush"

== 2004 ==
=== I-20 – Self-Explanatory ===
- 07. "May Sound Crazy"

=== Guerilla Black – Guerrilla City ===
- 15. "My First"

== 2005 ==
=== Milli Mae – "My Baby Daddy" 12" ===
- A1. "My Baby Daddy"

=== Proof – Searching for Jerry Garcia ===
- 14. "Jump Biatch"

== 2006 ==
=== Lake – My Brother's Keeper ===
- 02. "Ghetto"

=== Shareefa – Point of No Return ===
- 10. "Assumptions"

== 2007 ==
=== Camp Lo – Black Hollywood ===
1. "Posse from the Bronx"
2. "82 Afros"
3. "Soul Fever"
4. "Pushahoe"
5. "Suga Willie's Revenge"
6. "Jack n' Jill"
7. "Material"
8. "Money Clap"
9. "Ganja Lounge"
10. "Black Hollywood"
11. "Zoom"
12. "Sweet Claudine"

=== Pittsburgh Slim – Tastemaker ===
1. "Pittsburgh Slim"
2. "Superstar Extraordinaire"
3. "My Flashy World"
4. "Girls Kiss Girls"
5. "Sunrays"
6. "Kiss and Tell"
7. "Toy"

== 2009 ==
=== Willy Northpole – Tha Connect ===
- 1. "Intro" (produced with Kevin "Khao" Kates)

=== Camp Lo – Another Heist ===
1. "Another Heist"
2. "Uptown"
3. "Satin Amnesia"
4. "Son of A"
5. "Good Green"
6. "Beautiful People"
7. "Bionic"
8. "Black Connect 3"
9. "I Love It Then"
10. "Uptown (Remix)"

== 2010 ==
=== The Cool Kids – Tacklebox (The Cool Kids Mixtape) ===
- 7. "Birthdays"

=== Homeboy Sandman – The Good Sun ===
- 4. "Yeah But I Can Rhyme Though"

=== Curren$y – Pilot Talk ===
- 1. "Example"
- 2. "Audio Dope II"
- 3. "King Kong"
- 4. "Seat Change (feat. Snoop Dogg)"
- 5. "Breakfast" (produced with Mos Def)
- 7. "Skybourne" (feat. Big K.R.I.T. & Smoke DZA)"
- 8. "The Hangover (feat. Mikey Rocks)"
- 9. "The Day (feat. Jay Electronica & Mos Def)"
- 11. "Chilled Coughpee (feat. Devin the Dude)"
- 12. "Address (feat. Stalley)"
- 13. "Life Under the Scope" (produced with Michael Sterling Eaton)

=== Ski Beatz – 24 Hour Karate School ===
1. "Nothing But Us (feat. Curren$y & Smoke DZA)"
2. "Go (feat. Jim Jones & Curren$y)"
3. "Prowler 2 (feat. Jean Grae, Jay Electronica & Joell Ortiz)"
4. "Do It Big!! (feat. The Cool Kids & Stalley)"
5. "S.T.A.L.L.E.Y. (feat. Stalley)"
6. "Not Like Me (feat. Tabi Bonney)"
7. "Scaling the Building (feat. Wiz Khalifa & Curren$y)"
8. "Super Bad (feat. Rugz D. Bewler)"
9. "I Got Mines (feat. Tabi Bonney, Nikki Wray, Ras Kass & Stalley)"
10. "Back Uptown (feat. Camp Lo)"
11. "Cream of the Planet (Instrumental)"
12. "Taxi (Instrumental)"

=== Curren$y – Pilot Talk II ===
- 1. "Airborne Aquarium"
- 2. "Michael Knight"
- 3. "Montreux"
- 5. "Flight Briefing (feat. Young Roddy & Trademark Da Skydiver)"
- 6. "A Gee"
- 7. "Real Estates (feat. Dom Kennedy)"
- 8. "Silence (feat. McKenzie Eddy)"
- 11. "Highed Up"
- 13. "Michael Knight (Remix) (feat. Raekwon)"

== 2011 ==
=== Talib Kweli – Gutter Rainbows ===
- 09. "Cold Rain"

=== Jet Life – Jet World Order ===
- 14. "Pre-Roasted"

=== Dynasty Electric – Golden Arrows ===
1. "Golden Arrows"
2. "Radiation"
3. "Infectious"
4. "Bird Song"
5. "Spell of Time"
6. "And The Sky"
7. "Box of Light"
8. "Reality Check"
9. "Friends"
10. "Electro Retro"
11. "Mountain Song"
12. "Bird Song (One Drop)"

=== Tabi Bonney – The Summer Years ===
1. "On Jupiter (feat. Itadi Bonney)"
2. "Parachute"
3. "Groupie Gridlock"
4. "Frontin"
5. "Feeling More (feat. Nicole Wray)"
6. "Beautiful Lover (feat. Terri Walker)"
7. "Hello & Goodnight"
8. "Winners Parade (feat. Nicole Wray)"
9. "Top Notch"
10. "Big Dreams"
11. "Hip Hop & Love (feat. Murs)"
12. "Chasing (Feat. Matt Beilis)"

=== Murs – Love and Rockets Vol. 1: The Transformation ===
1. "Epic Salutations"
2. "Remember 2 Forget"
3. "67 Cutlass"
4. "Eazy-E"
5. "Hip Hop and Love (feat. Tabi Bonney)"
6. "International"
7. "S-k-i-b-e-a-t-z (feat. Locksmith)"
8. "Westside Love"
9. "Life and Time (feat. Ab-Soul and O.C.)"
10. "Reach Hire"
11. "Dream on (feat. Dee-1)"
12. "316 Ways"
13. "Animal Style"

=== Locksmith – Embedded ===
1. "Intro (The Mirror)"
2. "Stokely Carmichael"
3. "Silly Negro"
4. "Devil's Lasso"
5. "Mr. Program Director"
6. "100 Million Views"
7. "Look How I Shine (feat. Terri Walker)"
8. "Attention Whore"
9. "Games"
10. "The Bottom"
11. "Metabolic"
12. "Going Numb"

== 2012 ==
=== Ski Beatz – 24 Hour Karate School Presents Twilight ===
1. "Didit4thegreen (feat. Da$h & Retch)"
2. "Fly By (feat. Curren$y)"
3. "Heaven Is (feat. C Plus)"
4. "Gentlemen's Quarterly (feat. Stalley)"
5. "Living It Up (feat. Mikey Rocks & Trademark Da Skydiver)"
6. "Fly High (feat. Smoke DZA & Terri Walker)"
7. "Hip-Hop & Love (Feat. Tabi Bonney & Murs)"
8. "City Lights (Feat. Najee)"
9. "On (Feat. Sam Adams & Olamide Faison)"
10. "Time Goes (feat. Mac Miller)"
11. "Thank God (Feat. Rugz D. Bewler & Nicole Wray)"

== 2014 ==
=== Smoke DZA – Dream.ZONE.Achieve ===
- 5. "Jigga Flow" (feat. NymLo)

== 2015 ==
=== Curren$y – Pilot Talk III ===
- 2. "Long As the Lord Say"
- 5. "Get Down"
- 6. "Sidewalk Show"
- 8. "Audio Dope 5"
- 11. "Search Party"
- 13. "Briefcase"
- 15. "Alert (feat. Styles P)"

=== Mos Def & Ski Beatz ===
- 1. "Sensei on the Block"

== 2021 ==
=== Fee the Evolutionist feat. Professor Lyrical and Ruby Shabazz (X-Caliber) ===
- 01. "Back in the Dayz"

=== Curren$y – Pilot Talk IV ===
1. "Big Game Fishing"
2. "AD6 (feat. Jay Electronica)"
3. "Non Fungible"
4. "There It Is"
5. "Workers and Bosses"
6. "The Scene"
7. "Memory Lane"
8. "So Easy"
9. "Under the Wings"
10. "Finger Roll"
