= Stalley discography =

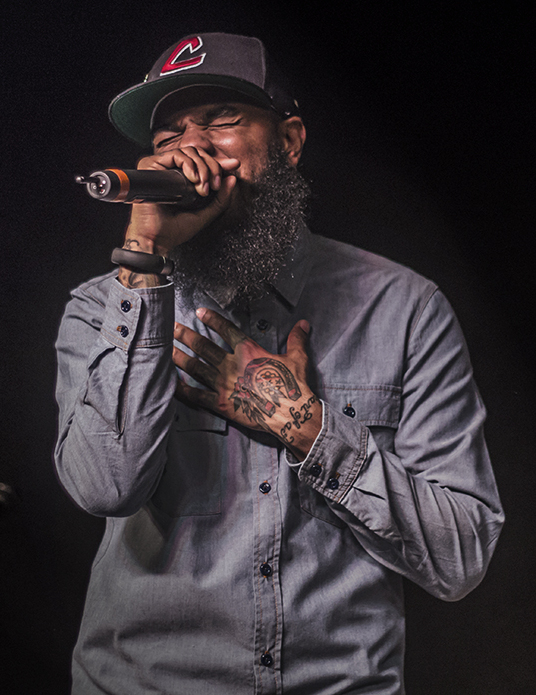
- Studio albums: 7
- EPs: 4
- Mixtapes: 9
- Collaborative album: 7

The discography of Stalley, an American hip hop recording artist, consists of seven studio albums, nine mixtapes, seven extended plays (EPs), and four collaborative albums.

== Albums ==
=== Studio albums ===
List of albums, with selected chart positions
Title	Album details	Peak chart positions		
Title	Album details	US	US R&B/HH	US Rap
Ohio	Released: October 27, 2014; Label: Maybach Music Group, Atlantic; Format: CD, digital download	35	5	5
New Wave	Released: July 28, 2017; Label: Real Talk Entertainment; Format: CD, digital download, streaming	—	—	—
Another Level	Released: October 20, 2017; Label: Real Talk Entertainment; Format: CD, digital download, streaming	—	—	—
Reflection Of Self: The Head Trip	Released: November 1, 2019; Label: Blue Collar Gang, Nature Sounds; Format: Streaming, digital download	—	—	—
Gone Baby, Gone	Released: July 9, 2021; Label: Blue Collar Gang, Nature Sounds; Format: Streaming, digital download	—	—	—
Somebody Up There Loves Me	Released: December 6, 2022; Label: Mello Music Group; Format: Streaming, digital download	—	—	—
Peerless	Released: July 5, 2024; Label: Blue Collar Gang; Format: Streaming, digital download	—	—	—
Gamla Kyrkogatan	Released: February 21, 2025; Label: Blue Collar Gang; Format: Streaming, digital download			
"—" denotes a title that did not chart, or was not released in that territory.

=== Mixtapes ===
List of mixtapes, with year released
Title	Album details
Goin' Ape (hosted by Terry Urban)	Released: 2008; Label: Self-released; Format: Digital download
MadStalley: The Autobiography (prod. by Madlib)	Released: July 14, 2009; Label: Self-released; Format: Digital download
Lincoln Way Nights: Intelligent Trunk Music (prod. by Rashad; presented by Мишка, aka Mishka NYC)	Released: February 8, 2011; Label: SMC Entertainment; Format: Digital download, CD
Songs by Me, Stalley	Released: February 29, 2012; Label: Self-released, Maybach Music Group; Format: Digital download
Savage Journey To The American Dream	Released: March 30, 2012; Label: Maybach Music Group; Format: Digital download
Honest Cowboy (full-length mixtape)	Released: August 8, 2013; Label: Maybach Music Group; Format: Digital download
The Laughing Introvert	Released: August 20, 2015; Label: Maybach Music Group; Format: Digital download
Saving Yusuf	Released: January 25, 2016; Label: Maybach Music Group; Format: Digital download

=== Extended plays ===
List of extended plays, with year released
Title	Album details
Honest Cowboy -EP (abridged from mixtape)	Released: September 17, 2013; Label: Maybach Music Group, Atlantic; Format: Digital download
Tell The Truth: Shame The Devil, Vol. 1	Released: November 17, 2017; Label: Blue Collar Gang; Format: Digital download
Tell The Truth: Shame The Devil, Vol. 2	Released: February 23, 2018; Label: Blue Collar Gang; Format: Digital download
Tell The Truth: Shame The Devil, Vol. 3	Released: May 18, 2018; Label: Blue Collar Gang; Format: Digital download
Pariah	Released: April 24, 2020; Label: Blue Collar Gang; Format: Digital download
Speak No Blue	Released: September 25, 2020; Label: Blue Collar Gang; Format: Digital download
Cake	Released: October 30, 2020; Label: Blue Collar Gang; Format: Digital download

=== Collaborative albums and mixtapes ===
List of collaborative albums, with selected chart positions and sales figures
Title	Album details	Peak chart positions					Sales
Title	Album details	US	US R&B/HH	US Rap	CAN	FRA	Sales
Stalley & the Wax Machine (performed with The Wax Machine)	Released: October 1, 2007; Label: self-released; Format: Digital download	TBA	TBA	TBA	TBA		
Self Made Vol. 1 (with Maybach Music Group)	Released: May 23, 2011; Label: Maybach Music Group, Warner Bros.; Format: CD, digital download	5	1	1	—	—	US: 225,000
Self Made Vol. 2 (with Maybach Music Group)	Released: June 26, 2012; Label: Maybach Music Group, Warner Bros.; Format: CD, digital download	4	1	1	37	—	US: 270,000
Self Made Vol. 3 (with Maybach Music Group)	Released: September 17, 2013; Label: Maybach Music Group, Atlantic; Format: CD, digital download	4	1	1	—	182	
Bushido (with Mello Music Group)	Released: April 2, 2021; Label: Mello Music Group; Format: CD, digital download	TBA	TBA	TBA	TBA		
Blacklight (produced by Apollo Brown)	Released: November 19, 2021; Label: Mello Music Group; Format: CD, digital download	TBA	TBA	TBA	TBA	TBA	
"—" denotes a recording that did not chart or was not released in that territory.

=== Compilation albums ===
List of compilation albums, with year released
Title	Album details
Know More: The Best of Stalley	Released: November 21, 2013; Label: Maybach Music Group; Format: Digital download

== Singles ==
=== As lead artist ===
List of singles, with selected chart positions and certifications, showing year released and album name
Title	Year	Peak chart positions			Album
Title	Year	US	US R&B/HH	US Rap	Album
"Lincoln Way Nights (Shop)" (Remix) (featuring Rick Ross)	2011	—	—	—	Lincoln Way Nights
"Swangin" (featuring Scarface)	2013	—	—	—	Honest Cowboy
"Jackin' Chevys"	2014	—	—	—	Ohio
"Always Into Something" (featuring Ty Dolla Sign)	2014	—	—	—	Ohio
"One More Shot" (featuring August Alsina and Rick Ross)	2014	—	—	—	Ohio
"—" denotes a title that did not chart, or was not released in that territory.

=== As featured artist ===
List of singles as featured performer, with selected chart positions, showing year released and album name
Title	Year	Peak chart positions			Album
Title	Year	US	US R&B/HH	US Rap	Album
"Slow Down" (Torch featuring Meek Mill, Wale, Gunplay, Stalley and Young Breed)	2012	—	—	—	U.F.O. Vol. 2
"—" denotes a recording that did not chart or was not released in that territory.

== Guest appearances ==
List of non-single guest appearances, with other performing artists, showing year released and album name
Title	Year	Other artist(s)	Album
"Address"	2010	Curren$y	Pilot Talk
"Do It Big"	2010	Ski Beatz, The Cool Kids	24 Hour Karate School
"I Got Mines"	2010	Ski Beatz, Tabi Bonney, Nikki Wray, Ras Kass	24 Hour Karate School
"S.T.A.L.L.E.Y."	2010	Ski Beatz	24 Hour Karate School
"Cook Up"	2011	Wale, Black Cobain, Tone P	—N/a
"The World Is Ours"	2012	Rick Ross, Pharrell, Meek Mill	Rich Forever
"Party Heart"	2012	Rick Ross, 2 Chainz	Rich Forever
"Slow Down"	2012	Torch, Meek Mill, Wale, Gunplay, Young Breed	U.F.O. Vol. 2
"Gentleman's Quarterly"	2012	Ski Beatz	24 Hour Karate School Presents: Twilight
"Another Round" (Remix)	2012	Rick Ross, Wale	—N/a
"Ten Jesus Pieces"	2012	Rick Ross	God Forgives, I Don't
"Tye Dye"	2012	Chevy Woods	—N/a
"Love Sosa" (Remix)	2013	Rick Ross	—N/a
"Fuckin' Problems" (Remix)	2013	Rick Ross	—N/a
"Thot Street"	2014	Fat Trel	Gleesh
"Chain Smokin'"	2015	Gunplay, Curren$y	Living Legend
"5x A Day"	2016	Westside Gunn	Hitler Wears Hermes IV
"Payout"	2016	Skyzoo, Apollo Brown	The Easy Truth
"Hustle Route"	2017	Leeb Godchild	—N/a
"Peace of Mine"	2018	Gerald Walker, Rockie Fresh	—N/a
"Reflect Reprise"	2018	R+R=Now	Collagically Speaking
"Floatin'"	2018	Chico	Steak X Shrimp, Vol. 3
"Asteroids"	2019	Mickey Factz, Daylyt, Grafh, Skyzoo, Yatta Barz	The Achievement: The Deluxe Edition
"Let Me Know"	2020	LNDN DRGS	Burnout 4

== Music videos ==
List of music videos, with directors, showing year released
Title	Year	Director(s)
"Slapp" (featuring Rashad)	2011	Creative Control
"Pound"	2011	Walu
"Chevys and Space Ships"	2011	Shomi Patwary
"Sound of Silence"	2011	BMike
"Lincoln Way Nights (Shop Remix)" (featuring Rick Ross)	2011	Spiff TV
"330"	2011	Shomi Patwary
"Go On"	2011	Walu
"Gentleman's Quarterly"	2011	Jonah Schwartz
"The Night" (featuring Rashad)	2012	Dre Films
"Party Heart" (featuring Rick Ross)	2012	Dre Films
"Everything New"	2012	Rik Cordero
"Live At Blossom"	2012	Bryan Schlam
"Hell's Angels" (featuring Rick Ross)	2012	Dre Films
"Petrin Hill Peonies"	2012	Alec Sutherland
"Home To You" (featuring Wale and Anthony Flammia)	2012	Shomi Patwary
"Swangin'" (featuring Scarface)	2013	Mr. Boomtown
"NineteenEighty7" (featuring Schoolboy Q)	2013	John Colombo
"Gettin' By"	2013	Kellen Dengler
