= Brady Watt (producer) =

American producer and musician

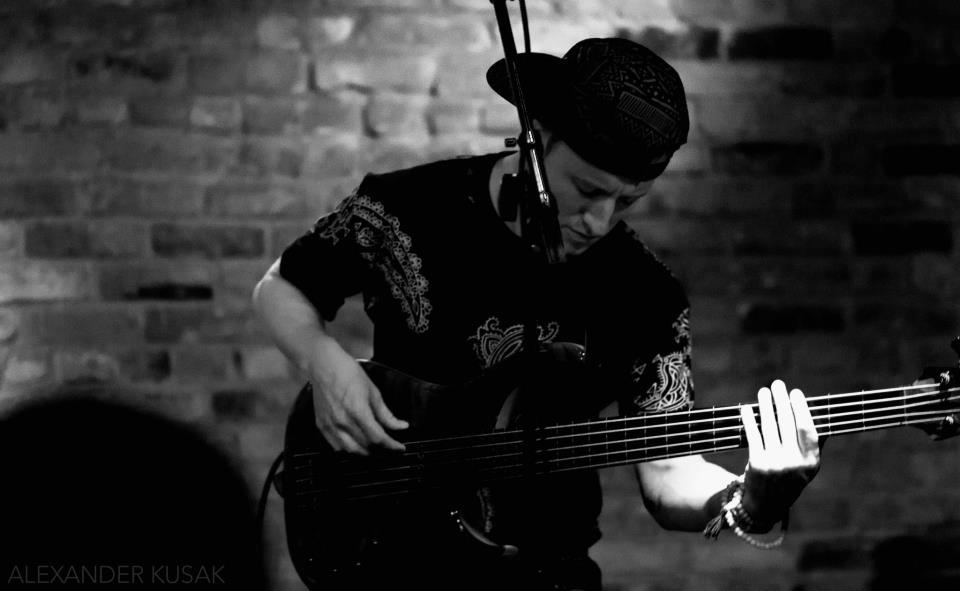

Background information
- Born: Nashua, New Hampshire, U.S.
- Occupations: Bass player, multi-instrumentalist, composer, record producer
- Instruments: Bass, guitar, pianos, synth, percussion
- Label: TTT

Brady Watt is an American record producer, bass player, and bandleader. In his career he has performed with a number of high-profile artists and ensembles and has taken part in thousands of recording sessions. He is currently based in Harlem, New York City.

== Early life and career ==
Brady Watt's music career started around age 14, playing bass in various groups in the New England punk scene. Before this he was a hip hop fan, growing up on Wu-Tang Clan, A Tribe Called Quest, Gang Starr, and others. His musicality evolved at a very fast rate under the tutelage of a few mentors and as he discovered and assimilated new styles such as various world music, funk, and fusion. He moved to Brooklyn where he began mastering his craft by playing with a who's who of legendary musicians and artists in the city and around the world. It didn't take long for him to rise in the ranks of New York musicians and become one of the most sought-after session bass players and performers in the city.

While playing bass, Brady inherited knowledge from all the producers he was working with. His inclination was to keep learning and begin producing records on his own. His skills as a multi-instrumentalist (bass, keys, guitar, and drums) and a finely tuned taste for drum production and music synthesis/soundscaping made this move only natural.

Watts has a series on YouTube called "Bass & Bars", where he plays bass alongside rappers. Through the series he has worked and jammed with such artists including Warren G, Marc Rebillet, Melanie Fiona, Talib Kweli, Murs (rapper), Xzibit, Pharoahe Monch. Krayzie Bone, Maino, Smooth B of Nice & Smooth, among others.

== Discography ==
=== Published and collaborated works as bass player ===
- Pilot Talk Curren$y (July 13, 2010)
- Live: From Brooklyn Bowl Bluroc Artists (July 13, 2010)
- George Kush The Button Smoke DZA (August 4, 2010)
- 24 Hour Karate School Ski Beatz (Sep 21, 2010)
- Save Bewler Rugz D. Bewler (Oct 19, 2010)
- Pilot Talk II Curren$y (November 22, 2010)
- Super Villain Reign Supreme Trademark da Skydiver (Nov 23, 2010)
- Gutter Rainbows Talib Kweli (January 25, 2011)
- 24 Hour Karate School 2 Ski Beatz (August 9, 2011)
- The Summer Years Tabi Bonney (Sep 27, 2011)
- Love and Rockets MURS (Oct 11, 2011)
- Habits of The Heart Talib Kweli (with Res as Idle Warship) (November 1, 2011)
- Embedded Locksmith (rapper) (Nov 15, 2011)
- Live: At The Bitter End (with Olamide Faison) (Dec 2011)
- Twilight Ski Beatz (Jan 2012)
- You, Me, and Everyone We Know Jean Grae (SINGLE) (Jan 2, 2012)
- Attack The Block Talib Kweli (Sep 3, 2012)
- Bars On Me Chris Webby x DJ Drama (Sep 30, 2012)
- Museum Rashad (Feb 19, 2013)
- Prisoner of Conscious Talib Kweli (May 7, 2013)
- Omni Love Decap (August 9, 2013)
- Coke, Jack, and Cadillacs Ro James(Sep 22, 2013)
- Gravitas Talib Kweli (December 15, 2013)
- The Green Box Locksmith (rapper) (2013)
- Jaded Jade De La Fleur (Jan 21, 2014)
- Thousand Cuts Locksmith (rapper) (April 15, 2014)
- What Goes Around Statik Selektah (August 2014)
- Lost For Words Sunny Pache (October 29, 2014)
- B4.DA.$$ Joey Badass (Jan 20, 2015)

=== Published works as producer ===
- Decap and Brady Watt (March 1, 2013)
- Cows Come Home Spose - Produced by Decap and Brady Watt (2013)
- Coke, Jack, and Cadillacs Ro James (Sep 22, 2013)
- Sunny Pache (Single) (2013)
- Jaded Jade De La Fleur (Jan 21, 2014)
- Qi Decap and Brady Watt (April 14, 2014)
- The Outsiders Smoke DZA and RFC (Nov 18, 2014)
- LIFETRONICS Brady Watt (Feb 12, 2015)
- Holy Mountain Spirituals Brady Watt (EP) (May 2015)
- The Seven Talib Kweli & Styles P (Apr 14, 2017)
- Waiting on You Jon B & Tank (Nov 9, 2023)
