= Love & Rockets Vol. 1: The Transformation =

Studio album by Murs and Ski Beatz
- Released: October 11, 2011
- Studio: Damon Dash's studio, Camp BluRoc, in upstate New York
- Genre: Alternative hip-hop
- Length: 48:50
- Label: BluRoc
- Producer: Ski Beatz

Murs and Ski Beatz chronology
Murs for President (2008)	Love & Rockets Vol. 1: The Transformation (2011)	Yumiko: Curse of the Merch Girl (2012)

Love & Rockets Vol. 1: The Transformation is a collaborative album by American rapper Murs and New York DJ Ski Beatz, released on October 11, 2011 by DD172's record label arm BluRoc Records. It was recorded at Camp BluRoc, a recording studio in upstate New York owned by Damon Dash. According to review aggregator website Metacritic, the album received generally favorable reviews from critics.

Professional ratings
Aggregate scores
Source	Rating
Metacritic	(72%)
Review scores
Source	Rating
AllMusic	4/5 stars
PopMatters	5/10 stars
Robert Christgau	(2-star Honorable Mention)
HipHopDX	(4/5)
XXL	(favorable)
Exclaim!	(favorable)

== Track listing ==
1. Epic Salutations
2. Remember 2 Forget
3. 67 Cutlass
4. Eazy-E
5. Hip Hop & Love (feat. Tabi Bonney)
6. International
7. S-K-I-B-E-A-T-Z (feat. Locksmith)
8. Westside Love
9. Life & Time (feat. Ab-Soul & O.C.)
10. Reach Hire
11. Dream On (feat. Dee-1)
12. 316 Ways
13. Animal Style

== Personnel ==
- Ab-Soul – Featured Artist
- Chelsea Baratz – saxophone
- David Barnett – design, illustrations
- Tabi Bonney – Featured Artist
- Kristopher Bowers – Keytar
- Matt Brandau – bass
- Will Caviness – Horn
- Matt Cody – engineer
- Damon Dash – executive producer
- Dee-1 – Featured Artist
- Embassy the Hitmaker – producer
- Raquel Horn – A&R, Administration
- David Linaburg – guitar
- Locksmith – Featured Artist
- McKenzie Eddy – A&R, Administration
- Murs – executive producer, Primary Artist
- O.C. – Featured Artist
- Harold O'Neal – keyboards
- Darryl Richardson – Photography
- Royal P – producer
- Ski Beatz – engineer, producer
- Greg Newman Spero – keyboards
- Brady Watt – bass

== Charts ==
Chart (2011)	Peak position
US Top Current Albums (Billboard)	200
US Independent Albums (Billboard)	41
US Top R&B/Hip-Hop Albums (Billboard)	29
