= De Anza High School =

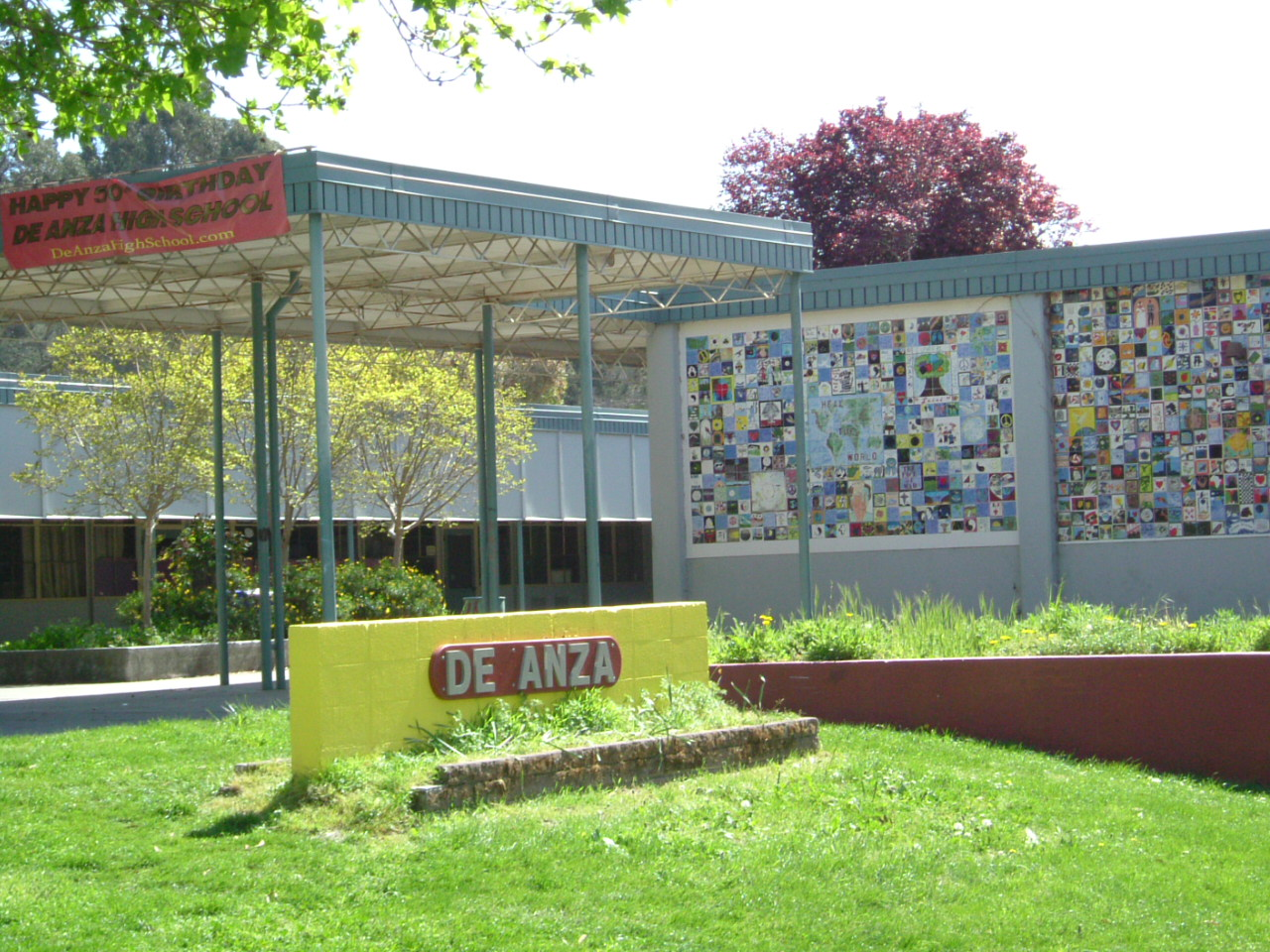

Location
- 5000 Valley View Road; Richmond, California 94803; United States; 37.967978°N 122.286636°W

Information
- Type: Public
- Established: 1955
- School district: West Contra Costa Unified School District
- Principal: Candace Cofield
- Teaching staff: 56.09 (FTE)
- Grades: 9–12
- Enrollment: 1,103 (2023–2024)
- Student to teacher ratio: 19.66
- Color: red gold
- Athletics: Football, tennis, basketball, volleyball, soccer, softball, baseball, swimming, golf, track & field, badminton, wrestling
- Athletics conference: CIF North Coast Section - TCAL
- Mascot: Don
- Academies: Health, information technology, law, JROTC
- Website: deanza.wccusd.net

De Anza High School is a secondary school in Richmond, California, United States, named after Spanish explorer Juan Bautista de Anza. It is part of the West Contra Costa Unified School District and serves northeast Richmond, the unincorporated communities of El Sobrante and Rollingwood, and a small portion of San Pablo.

== History ==
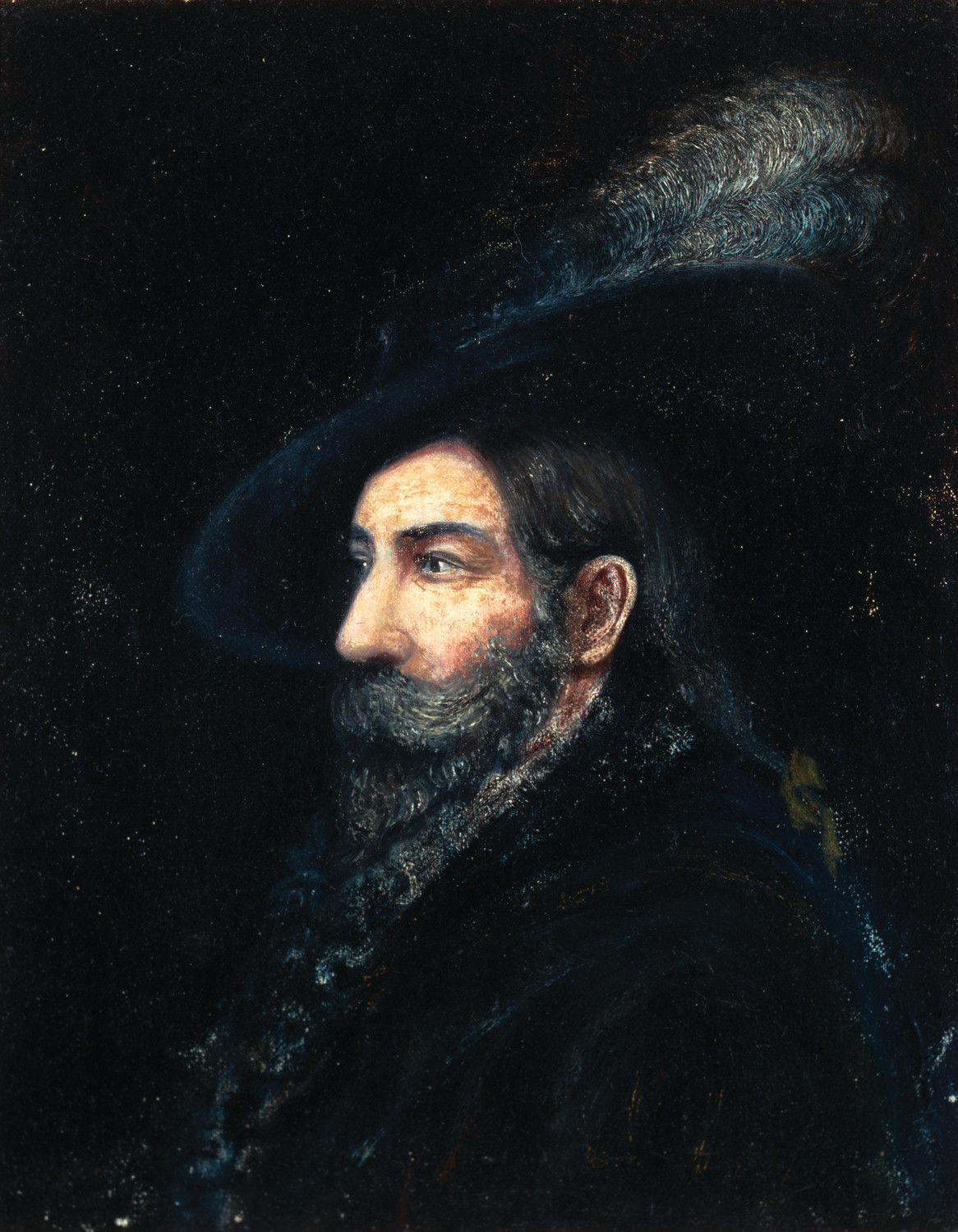
Juan Bautista de Anza, namesake of the school.

The school originally opened in 1955. In 2005 local voters passed Measure J, a bond measure which included $161 million to completely rebuild the De Anza campus. Reconstruction began in 2009 with a new all-weather track and artificial-turf football field, along with the demolition of the gym and other site preparation work. The new facility was opened for the start of the 2013 - 2014 school year.

The school offers four specialized course tracks intended to prepare students for a specific career, known as academies. The academies offered are health, information technology, law and JROTC. There are also many student-run clubs at De Anza, which range from clubs founded based around a shared interest like anime to clubs intended to support minority populations at the school.

== Test scores ==
California Standard Tests Scores, proficiency rate
English	Mathematics	Science
38%	13%	17%

== Notable alumni ==
- Brian Abshire (1982): 1988 Olympian in the 3000 meter steeplechase; former USA indoor 3000 meter record holder
- Joel Beck (1961): early "underground" comic artist
- Jeff Becerra (1982): Vocalist and former bassist of death metal band Possessed
- Greg Bracelin (1975): former NFL player
- Ken Burrow (1966): NFL player, Atlanta Falcons, 1971
- Les Claypool (1981): Primus bassist and lead singer
- Kirk Hammett (1980): Metallica lead guitarist
- Frank Lockett (1985): NFL player, Miami Dolphins
- Locksmith (Davood Ali Asgari) (2002): rapper and member of former duo The Frontline
- Silkk the Shocker (Vyshonn Miller) (1994): No Limit rapper and member of TRU
