= Harold O'Neal =

American film composer (born 1981)

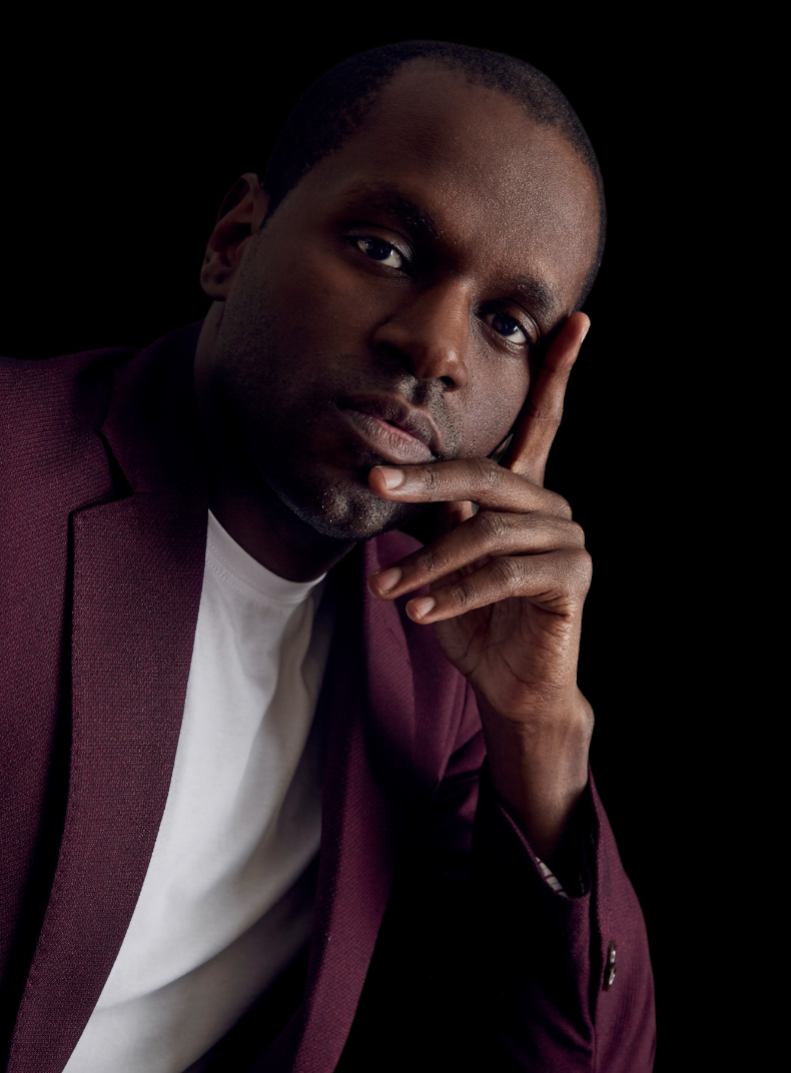
- O'Neal in 2021

Background information
- Born: Harold Mujahid O'Neal; 27 March 1981 (age 45); Arusha, Tanzania
- Genres: Film score, Jazz, Classical, Hip Hop, Pop, R and B, Rock
- Instruments: Piano, keyboard, synthesizer, drums, percussion
- Years active: 1998–present
- Label: Universal Music Group
- Website: haroldoneal.com

Harold Mujahid O'Neal FRSA (born 27 March 1981) is an American polymath, pianist, composer, producer, and creative strategist whose career spans music, film, storytelling, and innovation through collaborations and appearances with Dave Chappelle, George Clooney, Pixar, NASA, Josh Radnor, Jay-Z, ASAP Rocky, U2, Aloe Blacc, Neil deGrasse Tyson, Lupe Fiasco, William Shatner, and Bill Gates. Widely regarded as one of the great pianists of his generation, O'Neal's work has drawn comparisons in The New York Times to Duke Ellington's landmark 1953 album Piano Reflections and Maurice Ravel's Miroirs.

O'Neal's work has been featured and profiled in numerous publications and programs, including Forbes, NPR's All Things Considered, Fortune, Studio 360, and the 92Y, where he was featured as part of its 7 Days of Genius series.

In 2026, O'Neal performed with astrophysicist Neil deGrasse Tyson during The Universe Is Absurd!, a two-night live event at the Saban Theatre alongside actor William Shatner and trumpeter Keyon Harrold, and served as Music Director for the private finale party of A$AP Rocky's Don't Be Dumb U.S. tour alongside Dave Chappelle. He has also appeared in a co-starring role in the HBO series And Just Like That.

O'Neal has been awarded fellowship to the Royal Society of the Arts, an honor shared with eminent figures such as Charles Dickens, Benjamin Franklin, and Stephen Hawking.

== Early life ==
Harold O'Neal was born in Arusha, Tanzania, and raised in Kansas City, Missouri. His great-grandfather, Ollie Harold Pennington, was a jazz pianist and composer for silent film in Kansas City, where his grandmother walked to school with Charlie Parker. O'Neal began playing the piano by ear at age four on his father's miniature keyboard. He found his earliest inspirations in the music of Tom and Jerry, Looney Tunes, and Disney, specifically referencing The Cat Concerto.

Growing up, he spent a considerable amount of time with his grandmother exploring various creative outlets, before eventually becoming a pianist. Having spent much of his youth living in the projects (Public Housing) and surviving near-death experiences, he credits music with saving his life.

O'Neal was selected to attend Kumpf Elementary School, a school for gifted and talented children in Kansas City, where he developed the broad interdisciplinary interests that would later shape his career, before attending Paul Robeson Middle School in Kansas City where he received piano instruction from Mr. Fred Haws,. O'Neal attended the Paseo Academy of Fine and Performing Arts, with classmates Logan Richardson, Lil' Ronnie, and Brian Kennedy, where he studied jazz piano and composition under the mentorship of Ahmad Alaadeen. He studied classical piano and composition with Margie Cameron-Jarrett, whose musical lineage can be traced back to Franz Liszt.

== Early career ==
O'Neal began his career in music at a young age, touring with at the age of 19 after studying composition at Berklee College of Music. He then went on to attend the Manhattan School of Music, where he studied with Kenny Barron. It was there where he met the renowned American jazz pianist and composer, Andrew Hill and became his apprentice. Hill was himself an apprentice of the composer Paul Hindemith.

Following Hill's advice, O'Neal left the Manhattan School of Music to replace pianist Jason Moran in the influential band, the Greg Osby 4. This opportunity led to his major-label debut recording for Blue Note Records at the age of 21. In 2004, O'Neal premiered a jazz quartet featuring Greg Osby, Jeff "Tain" Watts, and Matt Brewer.

== Later career ==
In the following years, O'Neal released a number of critically acclaimed albums including Charlie's Suite (2006), which was a compilation of his family's legacy, Whirling Mantis (2010) with a jazz quartet, and a solo piano album Marvelous Fantasy (2011) on Smalls Records. He then partnered with Ski Beats and Damon Dash, after being signed to Universal Music Group as a songwriter and producer, to release the albums 24 Hour Karate School 2 (2011), Twilight (2012), and Cam'Ron And Vado's Blu Tops (2012).

In 2012, O'Neal formed a partnership with producers Lil Ronnie and Jerry Wonda, working with many Pop and R&B artists (Miguel, Akon, Melissa Ethridge, Raphael Saadiq, French Montana). In 2013, he released the album "Man on the Street" featuring a jazz quartet as well as solo piano for BluRoc, an at the time incarnation of Rocafella Records distributed by Def Jam Records.

In 2015, O'Neal worked as a composer for a featurette and documentaries of the 2015 Disney film Tomorrowland, produced by Academy Award winning-filmmaker Anthony Giacchino.

In May 2018, O'Neal released his solo piano album Piano Cinema, with "Sam and Sam" serving as the lead single. Following the album release, O'Neal completed a spring tour across the U.S. with The Blk Shp, with Pixar as a partner.

Recently, on the recommendation of Pixar co-founder Ed Catmull, O'Neal played a role as a creative expert in the development of Pixar's Soul, working closely with filmmakers Pete Docter, Dana Murray, and Kemp Powers.

== Music direction and production ==
Harold O'Neal works as a composer, pianist, performer, music director and producer in the entertainment industry. His experience includes managing and creating music for events such as Electric Burma with U2, The CNN Heroes All Star Tribute with Anderson Cooper and Kelly Ripa, and The Albie Awards.

The Albie Awards, named in honor of anti-apartheid activist Justice Albie Sachs, was an inaugural awards ceremony organized by The Clooney Foundation, hosted by John Oliver and featuring Aloe Blacc. The event serves to recognize and celebrate courageous defenders of justice, and has featured notable presenters such as Michelle Obama, Julia Roberts, Meryl Streep, Dua Lipa, Nadia Murad, and Oscar Isaac.

== Social Impact ==
As a keynote speaker and storyteller, O'Neal has been featured at Google, The World Economic Forum, TEDX, TIME, Aspen Ideas Fest, NASA Jet Propulsion Laboratory, and other leading platforms.

== Film and television ==
In 2009, O'Neal appeared as an actor in Jay Z's music video for the hit record "Young Forever", from his multi-platinum album The Blueprint 3. In 2010, he was cast in the HBO television series Boardwalk Empire, portraying James P. Johnson. He appeared in a co-starring role in the third and final season of the HBO series, And Just Like That.

== Credits ==
=== Film scoring ===
Year	Title	Director	Production Company
2015	Tomorrowland (Additional Music)	Brad Bird	Walt Disney Pictures
2015	Tanu Weds Manu Returns (Old School Girl)	Anand L. Rai	Colour Yellow Pictures
2015	Loisaidas (Episode 6)	Damon Dash Exec. Prod. Kanye West	Damon Dash Studios

=== Albums ===
Year	Artist	Title	Label
2018	Harold O'Neal	Piano Cinema	Piano Cinema Music
2013	Harold O'Neal	Man on the Street	Universal Music Group
2012	Cam'Ron And Vado	BluTops	Universal Music Group
2012	Ski Beatz	24 Hour Karate School Presents: Twilight	Universal Music Group
2011	Ski Beatz	24 Hour Karate School 2	Universal Music Group
2011	Harold O'Neal	Marvelous Fantasy	Smalls Records
2010	Harold O'Neal	Whirling Mantis	Smalls Records
2007	Harold O'Neal	Charlie's Suite	PME Records
