= Stalley =

American rapper (born 1982)

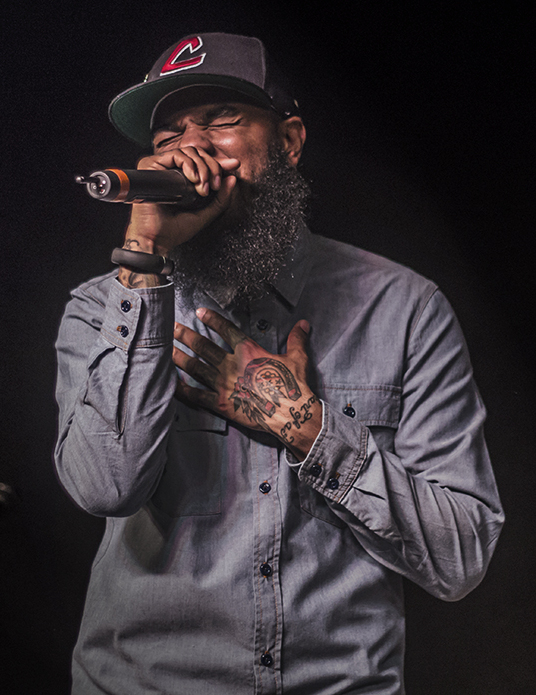
- Myricks performing in 2012

Background information
- Born: Kyle Alfonso Myricks; October 30, 1982 (age 43); Massillon, Ohio, US
- Genre: Hip hop
- Occupations: Rapper; songwriter
- Years active: 2008–present
- Labels: Nature Sounds; Blue Collar; Real Talk; Maybach Music; Atlantic; SMC; Mello Music Group

Kyle Alfonso Myricks (born October 30, 1982), better known by his stage name Stalley, is an American rapper from Massillon, Ohio.

== Music career ==
In 2008, Stalley made his mixtape debut, Goin Ape, with Terry Urban. In 2009, he followed with the release of the new mixtape, titled MadStalley: The Autobiography, and a newfound reputation as a force on stage. Stalley attended the 2010 Iron Mic Competition in Beijing as the featured MC.

=== 2011–2017: Maybach Music Group ===
After Stalley signed a deal to Rick Ross' Maybach Music Group (MMG) label. Stalley has worked with producers Ski Beatz on the tracks, including "Address", "S.T.A.L.L.E.Y.", "Do It Big", and "Harsh Ave". Artist, named Rashad Thomas, was featured on album Lincoln Way Nights and a recording artist, named J. Rawls would be featured on the track "Babblin".

Stalley was featured on Curren$y's Universal/Def Jam album Pilot Talk on the track "Address" (released in June 2010), as well as he featured on Ski Beatz's Universal/Def Jam projects– including 24 Hour Karate School and 24 Hour Karate School, Pt. 2. In February 2011, Stalley completed a sports-themed music project, commissioned by ESPN, for future use in television and online programming. Stalley's Lincoln Way Nights (released in February 2011) has received 130K+ downloads and reigned at number 2 for Bandcamp hip hop releases. Lincoln Way Nights (released in November 2011) debuted at number 18 on the iTunes hip hop charts and has sold 4K+ copies. Stalley also was featured on the Maybach Music Group albums, including Vol. 1 and Vol. 2, along with Rick Ross's mixtape Rich Forever. He also appeared on Ross' fifth studio album God Forgives, I Don't.

His most recent mixtape Savage Journey To The American Dream (released in March 2012), which reached 100K downloads in the first week, and was featured as the Stereogum Mixtape of the Week and the Spin Rap Release of the Week (7 out of 10). It was graded an XL by XXL, and HipHopDX awarded it 3.5 out of 5. The mixtape almost entirely produced by Huntsville, AL underground veterans Block Beattaz. Stalley's debut retail single "Swangin" featuring Scarface, from his Honest Cowboy, released on March 26, 2013, reuses a beat from G-Side's namesake track "Swangin" off their 2008 album "Starshipz & Rocketz", also produced by Block Beattaz. The music video was released on July 9, 2013, and featured a cameo from Paul Wall. On August 8, 2013, following of his mixtape's release, it was met with generally positive reviews from critics such as PopMatters. After it was revealed, it received a nomination at the 2013's BET Hip Hop Awards for the "Best Mixtape Category". After receiving a great response from his label, he released Honest Cowboy: EP to iTunes on September 17, 2013, which is on the same day as the release of the label's third compilation album Self Made Vol. 3.

On August 22, 2014, Stalley announced his debut album, Ohio, and four days later, he announced October 27 as the release date.

On August 21, 2015, almost one year since announcing his debut album, Stalley released a seven track mixtape, titled The Laughing Introvert. On January 25, 2016, Stalley released his 7th mixtape titled Saving Yusuf.

=== 2017–present: Independent ===
In 2017, Stalley released his second and third albums through Real Talk Entertainment, New Wave and Another Level. In an August 4 interview with Respect. magazine, he confirmed he was now independent.

In continuation of his independent releases, Stalley released the Tell The Truth: Shame the Devil in late 2017. The EP was the first in a trilogy, with Vols. 2 and 3 released in 2018.

On November 1, 2019, Stalley released an album titled Reflection Of Self: The Head Trip, a collaboration entirely produced by Jansport J. The album was self-released on his Blue Collar Gang imprint.

Stalley announced a full-length project, titled Blacklight, entirely produced by Apollo Brown on the independent Mello Music Group label. Set for release on November 19, 2021, the album has features from Joell Ortiz and Skyzoo, who both also separately collaborated with Apollo Brown on their own recent albums.

== Personal life ==
Stalley is a Muslim. When asked about his beard, he revealed he wanted something to grow with him as he grew as an artist, and "Second, I am a Sunni Muslim and it’s part of my religion and me reflecting on all the prophets and great men who had beards before me who were all wise and humbled in their ways of greatness."

== Discography ==
Studio Albums

- Ohio (2014)
- New Wave (2017)
- Another Level (2017)
- Reflection Of Self: The Head Trip (2019)
- Gone Baby, Gone (2021)
- Somebody Up There Loves Me (2022)
- Peerless (2024)
- Gamla Kyrkogatan (2025)

=== Singles ===
==== As lead artist ====
List of singles, with selected chart positions and certifications, showing year released and album name
Title	Year	Peak chart positions			Album
Title	Year	US	US R&B	US Rap	Album
"Lincoln Way Nights" (Shop-Remix) (featuring Rick Ross)	2011	—	—	—	Lincoln Way Nights
"Swangin" (featuring Scarface)	2013	—	—	—	Honest Cowboy
"Jackin' Chevys"	2014	—	—	—	Ohio
"Always Into Something" (featuring Ty Dolla Sign)	2014	—	—	—	Ohio
"One More Shot" (featuring August Alsina and Rick Ross)	2014	—	—	—	Ohio

==== As featured artist ====
List of singles as featured performer, with selected chart positions, showing year released and album name
Title	Year	Peak chart positions			Album
Title	Year	US	US R&B	US Rap	Album
"Slow Down" (Torch featuring Meek Mill, Wale, Gunplay, Stalley and Young Breed)	2012	—	—	—	U.F.O. Vol. 2
"—" denotes a recording that did not chart or was not released in that territory.

=== Guest appearances ===
List of non-single guest appearances, with other performing artists, showing year released and album name
Title	Year	Other artist(s)	Album
"Address"	2010	Curren$y	Pilot Talk
"Do It Big"	2010	Ski Beatz, The Cool Kids	24 Hour Karate School
"I Got Mines"	2010	Ski Beatz, Tabi Bonney, Nikki Wray, Ras Kass	24 Hour Karate School
"S.T.A.L.L.E.Y."	2010	Ski Beatz	24 Hour Karate School
"Cook Up"	2011	Wale, Black Cobain, Tone P	—N/a
"The World Is Ours"	2012	Rick Ross, Pharrell, Meek Mill	Rich Forever
"Party Heart"	2012	Rick Ross, 2 Chainz	Rich Forever
"Slow Down"	2012	Torch, Meek Mill, Wale, Gunplay, Young Breed	U.F.O. Vol. 2
"Gentleman's Quarterly"	2012	Ski Beatz	24 Hour Karate School Presents: Twilight
"Another Round" (Remix)	2012	Rick Ross, Wale	—N/a
"Ten Jesus Pieces"	2012	Rick Ross	God Forgives, I Don't
"Tye Dye"	2012	Chevy Woods	—N/a
"Love Sosa" (Remix)	2013	Rick Ross	—N/a
"Fuckin' Problems" (Remix)	2013	Rick Ross	—N/a
"Thot Street"	2014	Fat Trel	Gleesh
"Chain Smokin'"	2015	Gunplay, Curren$y	Living Legend
"5x A Day"	2016	Westside Gunn	Hitler Wears Hermes IV
"Payout"	2016	Skyzoo, Apollo Brown	The Easy Truth
"Hustle Route"	2017	Leeb Godchild	—N/a
"Peace of Mine"	2018	Gerald Walker, Rockie Fresh	—N/a
"Reflect Reprise"	2018	R+R=Now	Collagically Speaking
"Floatin'"	2018	Chico	Steak X Shrimp, Vol. 3
"Asteroids"	2019	Mickey Factz, Daylyt, Grafh, Skyzoo, Yatta Barz	The Achievement: The Deluxe Edition
"Let Me Know"	2020	LNDN DRGS	Burnout 4
