= Pilot Talk II =

Studio album by Curren$y
- Released: November 22, 2010
- Recorded: 2010
- Genre: Hip hop
- Length: 40:51
- Labels: DD172; BluRoc; UMG
- Producers: Damon Dash (exec.); Ski Beatz; The Senseis; Drupey; Monsta Beatz; Nesby Phips

Curren$y chronology
Pilot Talk (2010)	Pilot Talk II (2010)	Covert Coup (2011)

Singles from Pilot Talk II
- 1. "Michael Knight" Released: October 12, 2010

Professional ratings
Review scores
Source	Rating
Allmusic	3.5/5 stars
URB	4/5 stars
Pitchfork Media	(8.2/10)

Pilot Talk II is the fourth studio album by rapper Curren$y. The majority of the album was produced by Ski Beatz and The Senseis. Curren$y himself stated in an interview that the album would be released October 26, 2010. The album was moved back and released on November 22, 2010.

== Promotion ==
As with Pilot Talk, Pilot Talk II was given viral promotion with video blogging through DD172's online media network CreativeControl.tv as well as through their Vimeo page.

== Singles ==
The first single, "Michael Knight", was released for download on October 12, 2010. A video for the single premiered on CreativeControl.tv as well as their Vimeo page on November 6, 2010. A music video for the song "Hold On" was released on December 26, 2010 via Vimeo.

== Track listing ==
No.	Title	Music	Producer(s)	Length
1.	"Airborne Aquarium"	* Bass: Brady Watt: Drums: Daru Jones	Ski Beatz; The Senseis	2:51
2.	"Michael Knight"	* Bass: Brady Watt: Guitar: John Cave	Ski Beatz; The Senseis	2:54
3.	"Montreux"	* Bass: Brady Watt: Guitar: John Cave; Drums: Daru Jones; Trombone: Alex Asher; Saxophone: Nick Videen	Ski Beatz; The Senseis	2:03
4.	"Famous"	* Saxophone: Lance Ellis: Bass: Jean Lephare; Keyboard: Jean Lephare; Drum Programming: Deelow	Monsta Beatz	3:21
5.	"Flight Briefing" (featuring Young Roddy and Trademark da Skydiver)	* Bass: Brady Watt: Guitar: John Cave; Keyboard: Basil Wajdowicz	Ski Beatz; The Senseis	4:20
6.	"A Gee"	* Bass: Brady Watt: Guitar: John Cave; Drums: Daru Jones; Keyboard: Corey Bernhard; Violin: Yeji Cha	Ski Beatz; The Senseis	2:52
7.	"Real Estates" (featuring Dom Kennedy)	* Bass: Brady Watt	Ski Beatz; The Senseis	3:29
8.	"Silence" (featuring McKenzie Eddy)	* Bass: Brady Watt: Guitar: John Cave; Drums: Daru Jones	Ski Beatz; The Senseis	3:01
9.	"Hold On" (featuring Young Roddy and Trademark da Skydiver)	* Bass: Brady Watt: Guitar: John Cave	Nesby Phips	4:05
10.	"Fashionably Late" (featuring Dee Low)	* Bass: Jean LePhare: All Keyboards: Jean LePhare; Drum Programming: Dee Low	Monsta Beatz	3:10
11.	"Highed Up"	* Bass: Brady Watt: Guitar: John Cave; Trumpet: Omar Little; Sousaphone: Nadav Nirenberg	Ski Beatz; The Senseis	2:05
12.	"O.G...(The Jar)" (featuring Fiend)	*	Drupey	2:36
13.	"Michael Knight (Remix)" (featuring Raekwon)	* Bass: Brady Watt: Guitar: John Cave	Ski Beatz; The Senseis	3:44
