= Beyond Flavor =

Studio album by Original Flavor
- Released: February 22, 1994
- Recorded: 1993
- Studio: Power Play Studios (New York)
- Genre: Hip-hop
- Length: 46:05
- Label: Atlantic
- Producer: Ski

Original Flavor chronology
This Is How It Is (1992)	Beyond Flavor (1994)

Singles from Beyond Flavor
- 1. "All That" Released: 1994; 2. "Can I Get Open" Released: 1994

Professional ratings
Review scores
Source	Rating
AllMusic	3/5 stars
RapReviews	6/10
The Source	3/5 stars

Beyond Flavor is the second studio album by American hip-hop group Original Flavor. It was released on February 22, 1994, via Atlantic Records. Recording sessions took place at Power Play Studios in New York. Produced entirely by member Ski, it features contributions from Jay-Z, Damon Dash, DJ Clark Kent, Freshco, Michelle Mitchell and Sauce Money. The album peaked at number 83 on the Top R&B/Hip-Hop Albums chart in the United States.

The group disbanded shortly after this album was released, and Ski went on to work with Roc-A-Fella Records, the music label co-founded by Jay-Z, group manager Damon Dash, and Kareem Burke.

== Track listing ==
No.	Title	Writer(s)	Length
1.	"Intro"		0:55
2.	"Can I Get Open"	David Willis; Antonio Hooker; Shawn Carter	3:30
3.	"Beyond Flavor"	Willis; Hooker	3:11
4.	"Old School Skit"		0:17
5.	"Whatcha Want"	Willis; Hooker	4:37
6.	"Stick It Where the Sun Don't Shine"	Willis; Hooker	4:35
7.	"Blowin' Up da Spot"	Willis; Hooker; Don Alias	2:49
8.	"Hit"	Willis; Hooker	3:24
9.	"Nigga Code"		3:40
10.	"Many Styles"	Willis; Hooker; Carter; Shawn Conrad	3:40
11.	"All That"	Willis; Hooker	4:14
12.	"Shut Up and Manage"		1:02
13.	"Here We Go (Fuck It Up)"	Willis; Hooker	3:39
14.	"Keep On (Searching)"	Willis; Hooker	3:59
15.	"Shout Outs"		2:33
Total length:			46:05

Sample credits

- Track 2 contains sample from "Black Mystery Has Been Revealed" written by Rahsaan Roland Kirk.
- Track 4 contains elements from "Cymbaline" by Hubert Laws.
- Track 7 contains elements from "Sweetie Pie" by Stone Alliance.
- Track 14 contains elements from "Searching" written and performed by Roy Ayers.

== Personnel ==
- David "Ski" Willis – vocals, producer
- Antonio "T-Strong" Hooker – vocals
- DJ Chubby Chub – scratches (tracks: 3, 11)
- Shawn "Jay-Z" Carter – vocals (tracks: 2, 10)
- Todd "Sauce Money" Gaither – vocals (track 8)
- Damon Dash – vocals (tracks: 9, 12), executive producer, management
- Rodolfo "DJ Clark Kent" Franklin – vocals (track 9), mixing (track 2)
- Shawn "Freshco" Conrad – vocals (track 10)
- Michelle Mitchell – vocals (track 11)
- Phil "Skills" Castello – mixing & engineering (tracks: 1, 4–15)
- Russ – mixing & engineering (track 3)
- "Commissioner" Gordon Williams – mixing & engineering (track 3)
- Carlton Batts – mastering
- Richard Nash – executive producer
- Timmy Regisford – executive producer
- Elizabeth Barrett – art direction
- Thomas Bricker – art direction
- Michael Lavine – photography

== Charts ==
Chart (1994)	Peak position
US Top R&B/Hip-Hop Albums (Billboard)	85
