= Uknowhowwedu =

Single by Bahamadia

from the album Kollage
- B-side: "True Honey Buns"
- Released: 1995
- Recorded: 1994
- Genre: Hip hop
- Length: 3:35
- Label: Chrysalis
- Songwriter(s): Antonia Reed; David Willis
- Producer(s): Juan Cordova; David Willis

Bahamadia singles chronology
"Total Wreck" (1994)	"Uknowhowwedu" (1995)	"True Honey Buns" (1996)

"Uknowhowwedu" is a song performed by American hip hop musician Bahamadia, co-written with Ski Beatz, and issued as the second single from Bahamadia's debut studio album Kollage. In 1996, the song peaked at number 17 on the Billboard rap chart and number 15 on the dance chart.

"Uknowhowwedu" contains samples of "The Chase, Part II" by A Tribe Called Quest and "Gucci Time" by Schoolly D. Since the song's release, it has been sampled in "Crush on You" by Lil' Kim, "Pumpin'" by Novy vs. Eniac, "Lyrical Terrorists" by Nujabes and "Rock On" by Absolute Beginner.

== Music video ==
The official music video for the song was directed by Brian Luvar.

== Chart positions ==
Chart performance for "Uknowhowwedu"
Chart (1995–1996)	Peak position
US Hot Dance Music/Maxi-Singles Sales (Billboard)	15
US Hot Rap Singles (Billboard)	17
US Hot R&B/Hip-Hop Singles & Tracks (Billboard)	53
