= Dynasty Electrik =

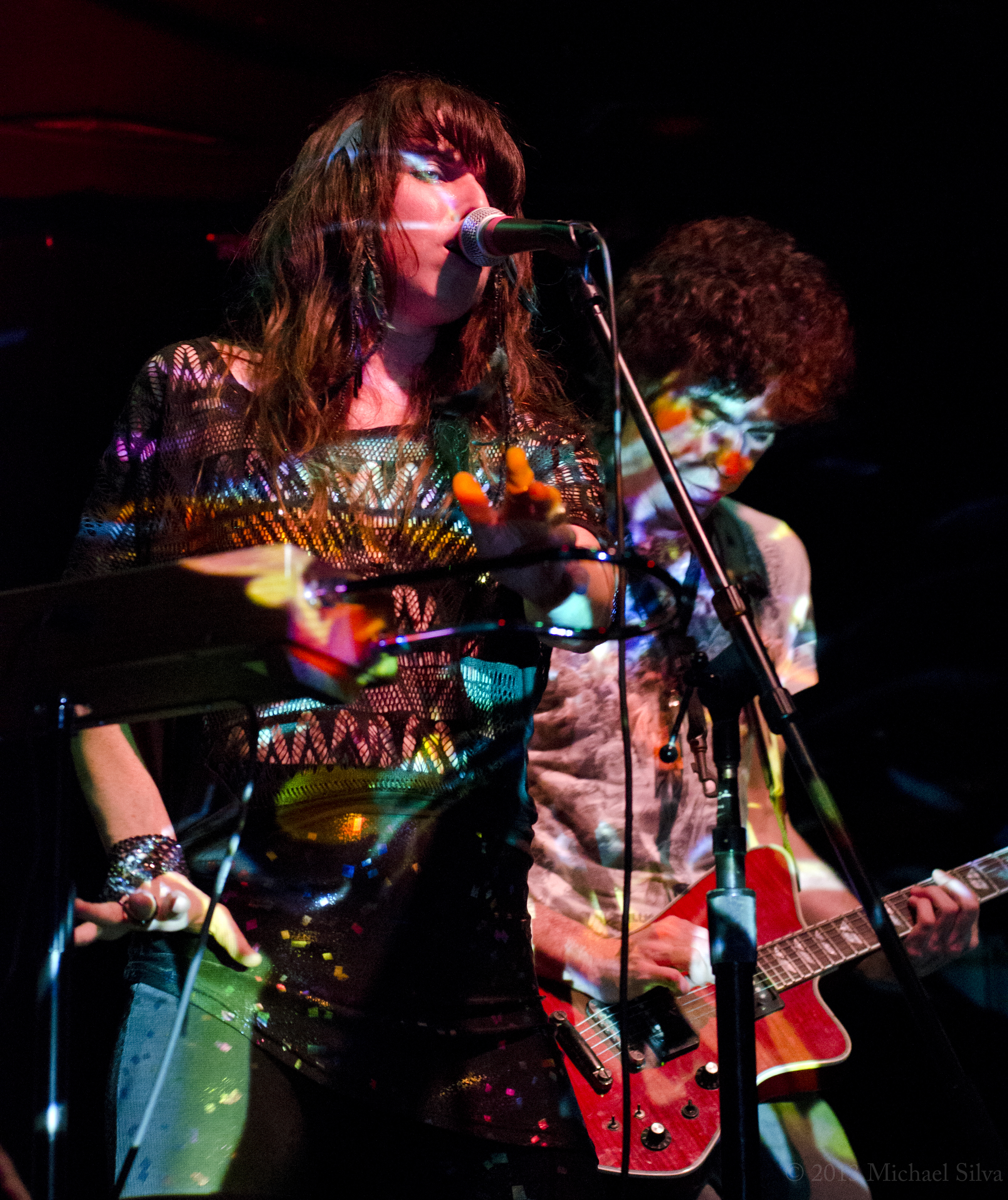
- Dynasty Electrik performing in April 2013. From left to right: Jenny Electrik and Seth Misterka.

Background information
- Origin: Brooklyn, New York, United States
- Genres: Electronic, indie, Ambient
- Years active: 2003–present
- Labels: Newsonic, French Kiss Music Group
- Members: Jenny Electrik; Seth Misterka
- Website: www.dynastyelectrik.com

Dynasty Electrik (a.k.a. Dynasty Electric) is an electronic rock and new age duo from Brooklyn, New York, and Los Angeles, California consisting of vocalist Jenny Electrik (Jennifer Deveau) and multi-instrumentalist Seth Misterka.

== History ==
The band was formed in 2003 by Seth Misterka, a multi-instrumentalist, producer, and composer with a background in a spectrum of musical genres. Misterka has worked with artists such as jazz musicians Anthony Braxton and William Parker, and indie bands Hot Chip, Shy Child, and The Fever. He provides guitar, electronics and saxophone for Dynasty Electric. Misterka met lead singer Jenny Electrik at a New York city bar in a chance encounter and asked her to join his band as a bass player. Originally the band performed experimental, instrumental improvisations. Jenny Electrik eventually assumed the role of lead singer, in addition to playing bass, synthesizer, and theremin.

The duo wrote and released their first single "Hypnotized" followed by the full-length album Black Box in 2004. They spent the following years touring the world and appearing in festivals like Summerfest, SXSW, CMJ Music Marathon, BAM's Sounds Like Brooklyn Festival, The Brooklyn Museum, Dewey Beach Music Festival, and the Burning Man Festival.

In 2009, they released the EP Burning, inspired by their appearance at Burning Man. This was followed by a U.S. tour in support of The Meat Puppets.

Also in 2009, Dynasty Electric was noticed by entrepreneur and hip-hop mogul Damon Dash who paired the band with producer Ski Beatz to record their third record Golden Arrows. The album was independently released in May 2011. British music news outlet NME named "Radiation", a track from the record as one of the "Top Best Free MP3 Downloads" during that week. At the same time, the online pop culture outlet Culture Brats hosted Dynasty Electric as their featured artist, later naming Golden Arrows in their list of the "Top 35 Albums of 2011".

In the summer of 2011, Dynasty Electric released a single "Electric Love" (with guest drummer Brian Chase from the Yeah Yeah Yeahs), and signed with Brooklyn-based label No Shame. Their self-titled album was produced by David Maurice (Kerli, Garbage) and features critically acclaimed turntablist DJ Logic. It was released in May 2012. The first single and video "Eye Wide Open" premiered on Nylon Blog, aired on MTV's 120 Minutes and has become a viral YouTube hit. It has also been the subject of over 450 remixes worldwide through Indaba Music. The second single, "Just Like That", was featured in a Victoria's Secret national TV commercial. In 2013, Dynasty Electric launched their own media label and events company - NewSonic. Their 5th album, Euphoria was released on November 12, 2013. In 2014, they released the single "Raw Honey", and in 2015 they released an EP called A Million Words of Love.

In 2016, the group changed the spelling of their name to Dynasty Electrik and re-located to Los Angeles, California. They became resident sound bath artists at Mystic Journey Crystal Gallery in Venice, California, and released the albums Crystal Sound Bath (2018) and Los Angeles Sound Bath (2019). Their transformation from Brooklyn electronic rock artists to Los Angeles sound healers was the subject of articles in Forbes and Magnetic Magazine.

== Discography ==
LPs

Title	Year
Black Box	2005
Golden Arrows	2011
Dynasty Electric	2012
Euphoria	2013
Crystal Sound Bath	2018
Los Angeles Sound Bath	2019

EPs

Title	Year
Toxic	2002
Things Have Fallen	2003
Burning	2009
Electric Love	2011
A Million Words of Love	2011

Singles

Title	Year
"Straight Line"	2006
"The Manmachine"	2006
"Eye Wide Open"	2012
"Euphoria"	2013
"Raw Honey"	2014
"Wild Animal"	2016
"Supernatural Animal Remix"	2016

Appears on

Album title	Song title	Year
Newsonic Vol. 1	"Golden Arrows"	2013
Newsonic Vol. 1	"Radiation"	2013
Newsonic Vol. 1	"Golden Arrows" (reggae Remix)	2013
Newsonic Vol. 1	"Lyrical Miracle" (Htimsetan Remix)	2013
Newsonic Vol. 1	"Golden Arrows" (Full Orchestra Mix)	2013
Sugar Sadness	"ESugar Sadness" (Feat.Dynasty Electric) -Original Mix	2012
Occupy This Album	"This is What America Looks Like"	2012

Music videos

Title	Year
"Closer To Contact"	2009
"Turn it On"	2010
"Golden Arrows"	2011
"Electric Love" (Cid d Kid Remix)	2012
"Eyes Wide Open"	2012
"Oasis"	2012
"Electric Love"	2012
2013
"Lyrical Miracle (Just Like That)" - HTIMSETAN mix	2013
"Om Shiva"	2015
