= Ohio (Stalley album) =

Studio album by Stalley
- Released: October 27, 2014
- Recorded: 2013–2014
- Genre: Hip hop
- Length: 47:47
- Label: Maybach; Atlantic
- Producer: Rashad Thomas; Jeffrey "Black Diamond" Kirkland; David D.A. Doman; Noel Cadastre

Stalley chronology
Honest Cowboy (2013)	Ohio (2014)	The Laughing Introvert (2015)

Singles from Ohio
- 1. "Always Into Something" Released: September 2, 2014; 2. "Jackin' Chevys" Released: September 2, 2014; 3. "One More Shot" Released: September 30, 2014

Ohio is the debut studio album by American rapper Stalley. The album was released on October 27, 2014, by Maybach Music Group and Atlantic Records. The album features guest appearances from Nipsey Hussle, Rick Ross, August Alsina, Ty Dolla Sign, Rashad and De La Soul. The album was supported by the singles "Always Into Something", "Jackin' Chevys" and "One More Shot".

== Background ==
In July 2012, Stalley announced he had begun recording his debut album, saying: "We're workin' on an album right now. I'm in the studio. I just got in there about a week ago, so it's a whole big process. Right now, I'm thinking maybe top of the year would be the album. I definitely just take [Rick Ross and Wale's] energy, and I definitely watch their energy and watch how they do things. I'm very observant of how they set up their albums and set up their singles and things like that, being that it's all new to me. That's great company to keep and great people to watch."

On August 22, 2014, he announced the album would be titled Ohio in a vlog, saying: "The sound of my current music is intelligent truck music. It’s a sound that’s built for the cars. But you can also enjoy it in your headphones, your computer or however you want to listen to it. Me, growing up, I rode around listening to music. It was kind of like the soundtrack my days or wherever I was going."

In an October 2014, interview with HipHopDX, he spoke about what he hopes people take away from the album, saying: "I think that people will take away that experience of, you know, Ohio isn’t a destination that most travel to, or even want to travel to. But we definitely have a lot culture, especially when it comes to music, and I just wanted to give that history, that sound, and I wanted them to know that we’re originators of a lot, a lot of sounds that have influenced Hip Hop, and I really wanted to incorporate that into my personal sound and give that to the world. And I definitely want people to take away knowing a little bit more about me as a man, as an artist, what I represent, what I stand for, and just what I bring to Hip Hop. What I bring to Hip Hop is that hard work ethic that was instilled in my being raised in a blue-collar town, and an original and great story. My life is a great story and I feel like people can take a lot from it and be inspired by it."

== Singles ==
On August 26, 2014, the music video was released for "Jackin' Chevys". On September 2, 2014, the album's first two singles "Always Into Something" featuring Ty Dolla Sign and "Jackin' Chevys" were released. On September 30, 2014, the album's third single "One More Shot" featuring Rick Ross and August Alsina was released. On October 19, 2014, the music video was released for "Always Into Something" featuring Ty Dolla Sign. Also a video was shot for the track "Boomin".

== Critical response ==
Professional ratings
Aggregate scores
Source	Rating
Metacritic	79/100
Review scores
Source	Rating
AllMusic	4/5 stars
Exclaim!	6/10
HipHopDX	3.5/5 stars
PopMatters	8/10
XXL	(XL)

Ohio received generally positive reviews from music critics. At Metacritic, which assigns a normalized rating out of 100 to reviews from mainstream critics, the album received an average score of 79, based on 5 reviews, which indicates "generally favorable reviews". AllMusic's David Jeffries said, "A fascinating first step, Stalley's Ohio really is the "intelligent trunk music" the man from Massillon, Ohio had promised in the pre-release press. Beats boom in a familiar style, rattling and pounding as if UGK were now running the Buckeye State, while storytelling lyrics come from a more elevated place, especially on the street-game documentary "Problems." Kyle Mullin of Exclaim! stated, "Such a slew of straightforward tracks make Ohio's few cerebral cuts, like the De La guest spot "Navajo Rugs," seem all the more out of place. Stalley showcases eclectic strengths on this release, but focus certainly isn't one of them." Roger Krastz of XXL said, "Stalley’s debut album is highly entertaining with a sound that is very refreshing in today’s rap scene. The MMG rapper’s experiences are captured remarkably throughout his storytelling, while still maintaining the Midwest theme of the album. Stalley leaves us with an impressive first project that only makes listeners desire for more "Intelligent Trunk Music." Andrew Gretchko of HipHopDX said, "Midwestern representative Stalley set out to make an album that reverberates with the values red state country has come to represent. And he has succeeded in selling us on the merits of the cold industriousness of Ohio, but his “intelligent truck music” doesn’t quite hit home. With a growing legion of fans and the backing to put together another potential standout project, expectations rose to a higher level for Stalley’s debut album Ohio than any of his previous projects."

== Commercial performance ==
The album debuted at number 35 on the Billboard 200 chart, with first-week sales of 10,246 copies in the United States.

== Track listing ==
No.	Title	Writer(s)	Producer(s)	Length
1.	"Welcome to O.H.I.O."	Kyle Myricks; Rashad Thomas	Rashad	2:16
2.	"Jackin' Chevys"	Myricks; Thomas; O'Shea Jackson; Eric Wright; Andre Young; Kirk Burrell	Rashad	3:26
3.	"Problems"	Myrick; Thomas	Rashad	3:24
4.	"Boomin’"	Myricks; Thomas; Derrick Hill; Morman Whiteside	Rashad	4:30
5.	"What It Be Like" (featuring Nipsey Hussle)	Myricks; Ermias Asghedom; Matt Beck; Alex Brofsky; David Lewis Doman	David D.A. Doman	4:05
6.	"One More Shot" (featuring Rick Ross and August Alsina)	Myricks; William Roberts II; August Alsina, Jr.; Noel Cadastre; D.C. Price	Noel Cadastre	4:31
7.	"Always Into Something" (featuring Ty Dolla Sign)	Myricks; Tyrone Griffin, Jr.; Thomas	Rashad	3:11
8.	"System On Loud"	Myricks; Jeffrey "Black Diamond" Kirkland; Clayton Knight; Harrison Mills	Black Diamond	3:15
9.	"3:30pm"	Myricks; Thomas	Rashad	4:06
10.	"Chevelle" (featuring Rashad)	Myricks; Thomas	Rashad	4:24
11.	"Free"	William Beck; Leroy Bonner; Ray Charles; Marshall Jones; Kirkland; Ralph Middlebrooks; Myricks; Marvin Pierce; Clarence "Satch" Satchell; James Williams	Black Diamond	3:16
12.	"Navajo Rugs" (featuring De La Soul)	Berry Gordy, Jr.; Alphonso Mizell; Myricks; Frederick Perren; Deke Richards; Thomas; Kelvin Mercer; Dave Jolicoeur	Rashad	7:25

== Charts ==
Chart (2014)	Peak position
US Billboard 200	35
US Top R&B/Hip-Hop Albums (Billboard)	5
