= This Is How It Is =

Studio album by Original Flavor
- Released: February 25, 1992
- Recorded: 1991–1992
- Studio: Firehouse Studios (Brooklyn, NY); Quad Studios (New York City)
- Genre: Hip hop
- Length: 45:28
- Label: Atlantic
- Producer: Ski

Original Flavor chronology
This Is How It Is (1992)	Beyond Flavor (1994)

Professional ratings
Review scores
Source	Rating
AllMusic	2.5/5 stars

This Is How It Is is the debut album from Original Flavor. The album, produced by Ski, was released by Atlantic Records on February 25, 1992.

== Track listing ==
#	Title	Composer(s)	Time
1	"This Is How It Is"	Havens, Reevers, Willis	3:40
2	"When I Make It"	Benson, Reevers, Willis	4:01
3	"Best Friend's Girl"	Harris, Reevers, Willis	3:29
4	"Way Wit Words"	Comanor, Reevers, Willis	3:12
5	"Kick The Butta"	Commodores, Reevers, Willis	5:05
6	"Waitin' 4 My Break"	Cropper, Reevers, Willis	3:27
7	"Handle The Technique"	Reevers, Washington, Willis	2:56
8	"Give 'Em Some Wrek"	Brown, Reevers, Willis	2:43
9	"Gumdrops"	Hancock, Reevers, Willis	3:53
10	"I Like It (Freestyle)"	Reevers, Willis	3:51
11	"Brain Storm"	Reevers, Washington, Willis	4:39
12	"Swingin'"	Reevers, Sample, Willis	4:32
13	"Here We Go"	Reevers, Willis	3:45
