= BB Queen =

Studio album by Bahamadia
- Released: July 25, 2000
- Genre: Hip hop; conscious rap
- Length: 25:14
- Label: Good Vibe

Bahamadia chronology
Kollage (1996)	BB Queen (2000)	Good Rap Music (2006)

BB Queen is the second studio album by Philadelphia-based rapper Bahamadia. BB Queen was released on July 25, 2000, through Good Vibe Recordings. BB Queen was Bahamadia's first release in four years, since her debut album, Kollage, which was released in 1996. The album peaked at number 25 on the Billboard Independent Albums Chart.

== Critical reception ==
Professional ratings
Review scores
Source	Rating
AllMusic	4/5 stars
The A.V. Club	(favorable)
Entertainment Weekly	B+
Exclaim!	(favorable)
RapReviews	8/10
USA Today	3/4 stars
The Village Voice	(choice cut)

Matt Conaway of AllMusic wrote that "the hypnotic lounge music of Jay Dee's soulful apprentices Dwele and EQ enables Bahamadia's subtle flow more of an opportunity to truly flourish [than on Kollage]".

== Track listing ==
1. "BB Queen's Intro" (featuring DJ Revolution) – 1:16
2. "Special Forces" (featuring Planet Asia, Rasco, Chops and DJ Revolution) – 3:25
3. "Commonwealth (Cheap Chicks)" – 3:37
4. "One-4-Teen (Funky for You)" (featuring Slum Village) – 3:27
5. "Philadelphia" (featuring Dwele) – 2:47
6. "Beautiful Things" (featuring Dwele) – 5:46
7. "Pep Talk" – 4:56

== Personnel ==
- Bahamadia – engineer, liner notes, mixing, primary artist, producer
- Chops – engineer, mixing, producer, vocals
- DJ Drez – engineer, producer
- DJ Revolution – engineer, guest artist, mixing, scratching
- Planet Asia – guest artist, vocals
- Rasco – guest artist, vocals
- Slum Village – guest artist, vocals
- Dwele – guest artist, vocals, producer

== Charts ==
Chart performance for BB Queen
Chart (2000)	Peak position
US Independent Albums (Billboard)	25
US Top R&B/Hip-Hop Albums (Billboard)	69
US Heatseekers Albums (Billboard)	35
