= Kollage (album) =

Studio album by Bahamadia
- Released: March 19, 1996
- Recorded: 1994–1995
- Studio: Firehouse Studio (New York, NY); D&D Studios (New York, NY); Studio G (Brooklyn, NY); Battery Studios (New York, NY)
- Genre: East Coast hip-hop; alternative hip-hop; jazz rap
- Length: 46:39
- Label: Chrysalis; EMI
- Producer: Da Beatminerz; DJ Premier; DJ Red Handed; GuRu; N.O. Joe; Ski Beatz; the Roots

Bahamadia chronology
Kollage (1996)	BB Queen (2000)

Singles from Kollage
- 1. "Total Wreck" Released: 1994; 2. "Uknowhowwedu" Released: 1995; 3. "I Confess" Released: 1996

Professional ratings
Review scores
Source	Rating
AllMusic	4/5 stars
Robert Christgau	(3-star Honorable Mention)
Muzik	2.5/5 stars
Spin	6/10
The Source	3.5/5 stars

Kollage is the debut studio album by the American hip-hop artist Bahamadia. It was released on March 19, 1996, via Chrysalis Records. The recording sessions took place at Firehouse Studio, D&D Studios, Studio G and Battery Studios, in New York. The album was produced by DJ Premier, Da Beatminerz, GuRu, N.O. Joe, DJ Red Handed, Ski Beatz, and the Roots. It features guest appearances from Lil' Cess, DJ Red Handed, Karen Bernod, K-Swift, Mecca Star, Nou, P.A.N., Ski Beatz and X-Cetra.

The album peaked at number 126 on the Billboard 200, number 13 on the Top R&B/Hip-Hop Albums and number 3 on the Heatseekers Albums charts in the United States. It was supported with three singles: "Total Wreck", "Uknowhowwedu" and "I Confess".

== Track listing ==
No.	Title	Writer(s)	Producer(s)	Length
1.	"Intro"	Chris Martin	DJ Premier	0:50
2.	"Wordplay"	Antonia Reed; Keith Elam	GuRu	3:17
3.	"Spontaneity" (featuring Lil' Cess and P.A.N.)	Reed; Walter Dewgarde; Ewart Dewgarde	Da Beatminerz	4:08
4.	"Rugged Ruff"	Reed; Martin	DJ Premier	3:08
5.	"Interlude"	Martin	DJ Premier	0:29
6.	"I Confess" (featuring X-Cetra)	Reed; Joseph Johnson	N.O. Joe	4:06
7.	"Uknowhowwedu" (featuring DJ Red Handed and Ski Beatz)	Reed; David Anthony Willis	Ski Beatz; DJ Red Handed	3:35
8.	"Interlude"	W. Dewgarde; E. Dewgarde	Da Beatminerz	1:09
9.	"Total Wreck"	Reed; Elam	GuRu	3:26
10.	"Innovation"	Reed; W. Dewgarde; E. Dewgarde	Da Beatminerz	3:23
11.	"Da Jawn" (featuring Nou)	Reed; Tariq Trotter; Malik Abdul-Basit Smart	The Roots; Bahamadia (co.); GuRu (co.)	5:19
12.	"Interlude"	W. Dewgarde; E. Dewgarde	Da Beatminerz	1:05
13.	"True Honey Buns (Dat Freak Shit)" (featuring Lil' Cess)	Reed; Martin	DJ Premier	3:41
14.	"3 the Hard Way" (featuring K-Swift and Mecca Star)	Reed; Martin	DJ Premier	4:12
15.	"Biggest Part of Me" (featuring Karen Bernod and Lil' Cess)	Reed; Johnson	N.O. Joe	4:51
Total length:				46:39

Bonus track
No.	Title	Writer(s)	Producer(s)	Length
16.	"Path to Rhythm"	Reed; J. Federman; L. Swedowsky; Raynard Howell; Ursula Rucker	JFK; Lee Miles; Richard Blask	3:21

Sample credits

- Track 3 contains samples from "Uzuri" written by Tyrone Brown and performed by Catalyst.
- Track 6 embodies portions of "Let's Get It On" written by Marvin Gaye.
- Track 15 embodies portions of "Lay Me Down Easy" written by the Isley Brothers and Chris Jasper.

== Personnel ==
- Antonia D. "Bahamadia" Reed – vocals, co-producer (track 11)
- Lil' Cess – additional vocals (tracks: 3, 13, 15)
- P.A.N. – additional vocals (track 3)
- X-Cetra – additional vocals (track 6)
- David "Ski Beatz" Willis – additional vocals & producer (track 7)
- Juan "DJ Red Handed" Cordova – additional vocals & producer (track 7)
- Nou – additional vocals (track 11)
- Karen M. "K-Swift" Williams – additional vocals (track 14)
- Kreda "Mecca Star" Akins – additional vocals (track 14)
- Karen Bernod – backing vocals (track 15)
- Joseph "N.O. Joe" Johnson – keyboards, producer, mixing (tracks: 6, 15)
- Preston "P-Funk" Middleton – bass (track 6)
- Corey "Funky Fingers" Stoot – guitar & bass (track 15)
- Jojo – keyboards (track 15)
- Christopher "DJ Premier" Martin – producer (tracks: 1, 4, 5, 13, 14)
- Keith "GuRu" Elam – producer (tracks: 2, 9), co-producer (track 11)
- Walter "Mr. Walt" Dewgarde – producer (tracks: 3, 8, 10, 12)
- Ewart "DJ Evil Dee" Dewgarde – producer (tracks: 3, 8, 10, 12)
- The Roots – producers (track 11)
- Carlos Bess – engineering (tracks: 2, 9)
- Kieran Walsh – engineering (tracks: 3, 10)
- Eddie Sancho – engineering (tracks: 4, 13, 14)
- James Hoover – engineering (track 6)
- Flip Osman – engineering assistant (track 6)
- Joe Quinde – engineering (track 7)
- Tim Latham – engineering (track 11)
- Skip Holman – engineering (track 15)
- Michael Gilbert – additional mixing (track 15)
- Herb Powers Jr. – mastering (tracks: 1–14)
- Chris Gehringer – mastering (track 15)
- Ceceley Chapman – executive producer, A&R, management
- Henry Marquez – art direction
- Ari Forman – design
- Lu Ann Graffeo – design
- Piotr Sikora – photography
- Lindsey Williams – A&R

== Charts ==
Chart (1996)	Peak position
US Billboard 200	126
US Top R&B/Hip-Hop Albums (Billboard)	13
US Heatseekers Albums (Billboard)	3
