= Greg Bracelin =

American football player (born 1957)

No. 52, 54
- Position: Linebacker

Personal information
- Born: April 16, 1957 (age 69); Lawrence, Kansas, U.S.
- Listed height: 6 ft 1 in (1.85 m)
- Listed weight: 214 lb (97 kg)

Career information
- High school: De Anza (Richmond, California)
- College: California (1975–1979)
- NFL draft: 1980: 9th round, 243rd overall pick

Career history
- Denver Broncos (1980); Oakland Raiders (1981); Baltimore/Indianapolis Colts (1982–1984)

Awards and highlights
- Second-team All-Pac-10 (1979)

Career NFL statistics
- Sacks: 9.5
- Interceptions: 3
- Fumble recoveries: 1
- Stats at Pro Football Reference

Gregory Lee Bracelin (born April 16, 1957) is an American former professional football player who was a linebacker in the National Football League (NFL). He attended De Anza High School and played college football for the California Golden Bears.
