= Swangin =

Single by Stalley featuring Scarface

from the album Honest Cowboy
- Released: March 26, 2013
- Recorded: 2012–2013
- Genre: Hip hop
- Length: 6:05
- Label: Maybach; Atlantic
- Songwriters: Kyle Myricks; Brad Terrence Jordan
- Producer: The Block Beattaz

Stalley singles chronology
"Lincoln Way Nights (Shop-Remix)" (2011)	"Swangin" (2013)	"'Jackin' Chevys'" (2014)

Scarface singles chronology
"My Block" (2002)	"Swangin" (2013)	"Steer" (2015)

Music video
- "Swangin" on YouTube

"Swangin" is a song by American hip hop recording artist Stalley, released on March 26, 2013, as the first single from his debut EP. The song, produced by Block Beattaz, features a guest appearance from hip hop legend Scarface.

== Background ==
"Swangin" is a tribute to Houston's classic car culture, Stalley explained. "I know they're real heavy into the Cadillacs and the American muscle cars and the old-schools like we [in Ohio] are. They kind of invented that swang, that swag, and that swangin', so I wanted to pay homage to those guys. There wasn't a better person to do it with than [Houston native] Scarface." The song contains samples of Mint Condition's "U Send Me Swingin'" & G-Side's "Swangin" featuring Darrien and The Speed of Sound Choir, the song is from the album Starshipz & Rocketz produced by The Block Beattaz. Stalley's version incorporates the same beat and hook as the G-Side track.

== Music video ==
The music video, directed by Mr. Boomtown, was released on July 9, 2013 and features cameo appearances by Rick Ross, Omarion, and Rockie Fresh, Paul Wall and Killa Kyleon. The clip includes scenes of Stalley and his friends cruising around his hometown of Massillon, Ohio in customized vehicles.

== Remix ==
On November 20, 2013, Stalley released the remix to "Swangin" featuring Houston rappers Lil' Keke, Trae tha Truth, Bun B, E.S.G., and Chamillionaire.

== Critical reception ==
Khari Nixon of The Source wrote of the song: "though its reminiscent of his former material, its slightly more captivating, and just when you think Stalley's laid back vocals will lull you to sleep, Scarface steps into the booth without a hiccup and lays down a near-perfect verse". David Drake of Complex remarked: "Calling a song with a Houston rapper 'Swangin' is perhaps the least imaginative possible concept for a record. But it's the little things: Block Beattaz' nuanced, sparkling production sounds clear and labored-over, their attention to detail unparalleled."

== Track listing ==
Digital single

No.	Title	Writer(s)	Producer(s)	Length
1.	"Swangin" (featuring Scarface)	Kyle Myricks; Brad Terrence Jordan	Block Beattaz	6:05

== Release history ==
Regions	Dates	Format	Label(s)
United States	March 26, 2013	digital download	Maybach Music, Atlantic Records
