= Will Caviness =

American jazz trumpeter

- Birth name: William Caviness
- Born: June 22, 1982 (age 42); Memphis, Tennessee
- Genres: Jazz
- Occupation(s): Musician, composer
- Instrument: Trumpet
- Years active: 1990s–present
- Labels: Cellar Live
- Website: www.willcaviness.com

William Caviness (born June 22, 1982) is a jazz trumpeter born in Memphis, Tennessee who currently resides in Philadelphia, Pennsylvania.

== Education ==
Caviness received his masters from the New England Conservatory of Music in 2008, moving to New York City thereafter.

== Discography ==
Caviness gained increased attention after the release of his first album, A Walk, recorded in 2014. A Walk reached the JazzWeek Top 10 for three straight weeks in 2016 and was reviewed in Downbeat Magazine.

=== Albums ===
- A Walk (Cellar Live, 2014)

=== As sideman ===
- Love + Rockets, Vol. 1: The Transformation (Bluroc, 2011)
- Muse (Creative Nation Music, 2009)
- The Old Ceremony (Alyosha Records, 2005)
