= Collagically Speaking =

Studio album by R+R=Now
- Released: June 15, 2018
- Studios: Henson Recording Studios (Los Angeles, California)
- Genre: Jazz fusion
- Length: 73:18
- Label: Blue Note
- Producers: Christian Scott; Derrick Hodge; Justin Tyson; Robert Glasper; Taylor McFerrin; Terrace Martin

R+R=Now chronology
Collagically Speaking (2018)	Live (2021)

Collagically Speaking is the debut studio album by jazz supergroup R+R=NOW. It was released on June 15, 2018, through Blue Note Records. Recording sessions took place at Henson Recording Studios in Los Angeles. Production was handled by Christian Scott aTunde Adjuah, Derrick Hodge, Justin Tyson, Robert Glasper, Taylor McFerrin and Terrace Martin, with Nicole Hegeman and Vincent Bennett serving as executive producers. It features contributions from Amanda Seales, Amber Navran, Goapele Mohlabane, India Shawn, Jahi Sundance, Mirna Jose, Omari Hardwick, Stalley, Terry Crews and Yasiin Bey.

== Critical reception ==
Professional ratings
Aggregate scores
Source	Rating
Metacritic	77/100
Review scores
Source	Rating
AllMusic	4/5 stars
Pitchfork	7/10
Rolling Stone	3/5 stars
Tom Hull	B

Collagically Speaking was met with generally favorable reviews from music critics. At Metacritic, which assigns a normalized rating out of 100 to reviews from mainstream publications, the album received an average score of 77 based on five reviews.

AllMusic's Matt Collar wrote: "none of these more pointedly thought-provoking [spoken word] additions detract from the overall flow of the album, and instead add to the overarching vibe of open-minded creativity, love, and empowerment". Marcus J. Moore of Pitchfork wrote: "while the album's open-endedness largely works to its benefit, Collagically Speaking occasionally meanders". In a mixed review, Hank Shteamer of Rolling Stone wrote: "singing, rapping and spoken-word float through these tracks, as do soulful improvs from Adjuah, Glasper and others, but what lingers is the overall aura: a no-seams-showing blend of jazz, R&B and hip-hop, with a spontaneous "3 a.m. in the studio" feel".

== Track listing ==
Collagically Speaking track listing
No.	Title	Writer(s)	Length
1.	"Change of Tone" (featuring Goapele)	Derrick Hodge; Justin Tyson; Robert Glasper; Taylor McFerrin; Terrace Martin; Christian Scott; Rose McKinney	7:32
2.	"Awake to You"	Hodge; Tyson; Glasper; McFerrin; Martin; Scott; McKinney	8:14
3.	"By Design" (featuring Jahi Sundance, India Shawn and Mirna Jose)	Hodge; Tyson; Glasper; McFerrin; Martin; Scott; McKinney; Jahi Lake	5:27
4.	"Resting Warrior"	Hodge; Tyson; Glasper; Martin; Scott; McKinney	9:51
5.	"Needed You Still" (featuring Omari Hardwick)	Hodge; Tyson; Glasper; McFerrin; Martin; Scott; McKinney; Omari Hardwick; Michael E. Neil	6:09
6.	"Colors in the Dark"	Hodge; Tyson; Glasper; Martin; McKinney; Arin Ray	4:48
7.	"The Night in Question" (featuring Terry Crews)	Hodge; Tyson; Glasper; McFerrin; Scott; Terry Crews	7:41
8.	"Reflect Reprise" (featuring Stalley)	Hodge; Tyson; Glasper; McFerrin; Martin; McKinney; Kyle Myricks	6:42
9.	"Her=Now" (featuring Amanda Seales)	Hodge; McFerrin; Amanda Seales	6:44
10.	"Respond"	Hodge; Tyson; McFerrin; Scott	5:21
11.	"Been on My Mind" (featuring Amber Navran and Yasiin Bey)	Hodge; Glasper; McFerrin; Scott; Amber Navran; Dante Smith; Lake	4:49
Total length:			73:18

== Personnel ==
- Derrick Hodge – bass, songwriter, producer
- Justin Tyson – drums and songwriter (tracks 1–8, 10), producer
- Robert Glasper – keyboards (tracks 1–8), piano (track 11), songwriter (tracks 1–8, 11), vocals (track 3), producer
- Taylor McFerrin – synthesizer (tracks 1–5, 7–11), songwriter (tracks 1–3, 5, 7–11), producer
- Terrace Martin – synthesizer and songwriter (tracks 1–6, 8), vocoder (tracks 1, 2, 5, 6, 8), saxophone (track 4), additional tracking, producer
- Christian Scott – trumpet and songwriter (tracks 1–5, 7, 10, 11), producer
- Rose McKinney – songwriter (tracks 1–6, 8)
- Goapele Mohlabane – vocals (track 1)
- India Shawn – vocals (track 3)
- Jahi Sundance – vocals (track 3), turntables & songwriter (tracks 3, 11)
- Mirna Jose – vocals (track 3)
- Omari Hardwick – vocals and songwriter (track 5)
- Michael "Phoelix" Neil – songwriter (track 5)
- Arin Ray – songwriter (track 6)
- Terry Crews – vocals and songwriter (track 7)
- Kyle "Stalley" Myricks – vocals and songwriter (track 8)
- Amanda Seales – vocals and songwriter (track 9)
- Amber Navran – vocals and songwriter (track 11)
- Dante "Mos Def/Yasiin Bey" Smith – vocals and songwriter (track 11)
- Keith "Qmillion" Lewis – recording, mixing
- Bryan DiMaio – engineering
- Robert "G Koop" Mandell – engineering
- Collin Kadlec – recording assistant
- Derrick Stockwell – recording assistant
- Chris Athens – mastering
- Nicole Hegeman – executive producer
- Vincent Bennett – executive producer
- Stephanie Darden – design
- Delphine Diaw Diallo – photography
- Chris Baldwin – photography
- Elizabeth Craig – photography
- Mathieu Bitton – photography
- Simon Benjamin – photography
- Justin "J3" Jackson – photography
- Freda Knowles – artist coordinator

== Charts ==
Chart performance for Collagically Speaking
Chart (2018)	Peak position
Dutch Albums (Album Top 100)	121
Swiss Albums (Schweizer Hitparade)	99
US Top Contemporary Jazz Albums (Billboard)	1
US Top Jazz Albums (Billboard)	1
US Top Album Sales (Billboard)	79
