= Original Flavor =

American hip hop group

Original Flavor was an American hip hop group active in the early to mid 1990s. The group, which originally consisted of Ski and Suave Lover, released two albums—This Is How It Is (1992) and Beyond Flavor (1994). On Beyond Flavor, Suave Lover was replaced by T-Strong (also known as Tone Hooker) and DJ Chubby Chub.

The group had a hit with their song "Can I Get Open," which prominently features Jay-Z. The track reached number 46 on the Billboard Maxi Singles chart. The group, managed by Damon Dash and his cousin Darien Dash, disbanded after it released Beyond Flavor and Ski went on to work with Roc-A-Fella Records, producing four tracks on Jay-Z's debut album Reasonable Doubt.

== Discography ==
- This Is How It Is (Atlantic Records, 1992)
- Beyond Flavor (Atlantic, 1994) U.S. R#B #85
