= The Frontline =

American hip hop group

- Also known as: Frontline
- Origin: Richmond, California, U.S.
- Genres: West Coast hip hop
- Years active: 2002–2007
- Labels: Infrared Music Group; Penalty Recordings; Landmark Entertainment
- Members: Left; Locksmith

The Frontline were an American rap duo from Richmond, California, which consisted of Left and Locksmith, also known as Lock. The group was associated with West Coast hip hop music.

== History ==
The two rappers were both born in Richmond and met while at Adam's Middle School, and formed the Frontline in 1997. Group member Locksmith first got national exposure appearing on MTV's Freestyle Battle in 2003. He reached the final round, but lost to a rapper named Reign Man. They initially recorded mixtapes and released their debut album, Who R You, in 2004, selling it themselves from the van in which they travelled to performances. After gaining popularity through airplay on local radio stations, the album was reissued with additional tracks in 2005 by Ryko as Now U Know.

Despite gaining popularity around the time of the Bay Area hyphy movement, the Frontline are not associated as hyphy artists. Their lyrics are more socially conscious than most Bay Area rappers. One of the issues that has been brought up in multiple songs is being positive role models for youths. While they are not opposed to gangster rap and rapping about previous transgressions, Lock and Left don't consistently make records about violence and do not romanticize it. Their hometown, Richmond, CA has one of the top homicide rates not only in CA, but in the United States. Neither rapper smokes or drinks alcohol, nor glorifies it in their songs. While promoting their second album, Lock & Left, on Bay Area radio station 106.1 KMEL, they discussed the downside to drugs and alcohol abuse. Much of their work has been produced by E-A-SKI. Lock and Left are both UC Berkeley Graduates (LEFT recently earned a PhD in African Diaspora Studies). Their dedication to youth and education is also reflected in their after-school mentoring and tutoring programs they have set up in the city of Richmond California. There are also two as-yet unreleased tracks named "I'm Still Livin'" & "Loco", which were released in underground and Bay Area Complication Disc. Locksmith has recently re-entered the battle arena and has emerged victorious in all of his recent battles (all of said battles are on youtube.com).

Locksmith said of the duo's approach: "We're trying to let them know that there's an alternative to the alcohol and drugs and violence that's going on. We don't down anybody for what they do, but at the same time we will show them that there's another route."

In 2009, Locksmith was working on his own solo album, Frank the Rabbit, produced by E-A-Ski.

== Discography ==
=== Albums ===
- Who R You (Oct 12, 2004) - Billboard Independent Albums #48
- Now U Know (May 10, 2005) - Billboard Independent Albums #46
- Lock & Left (Sep 25, 2007) - The single, "It's Goin' Down," is a hidden track on this album.

=== Mixtapes ===
- The Bootleg Album (2001)
- Bootleg II (2002)
- Bootleg 2.1 (2002)

=== Singles ===
- "What Is It" (2004)
- "Uh Huhh" (2004)
- "Bang It" (2005)
- "Take That" (2006)
- "When You Want It" (2006)
- "It's Goin' Down" (2007)
- "R.I.P." (2007)

The group has had three videos on MTV:

- "Bang It"
- "When U Want It" / "The Truth" (was MTV Jam of the week on MTV Jams and MTV U)
- "R.I.P."
