= Bahamadia =

American rapper (born 1966)

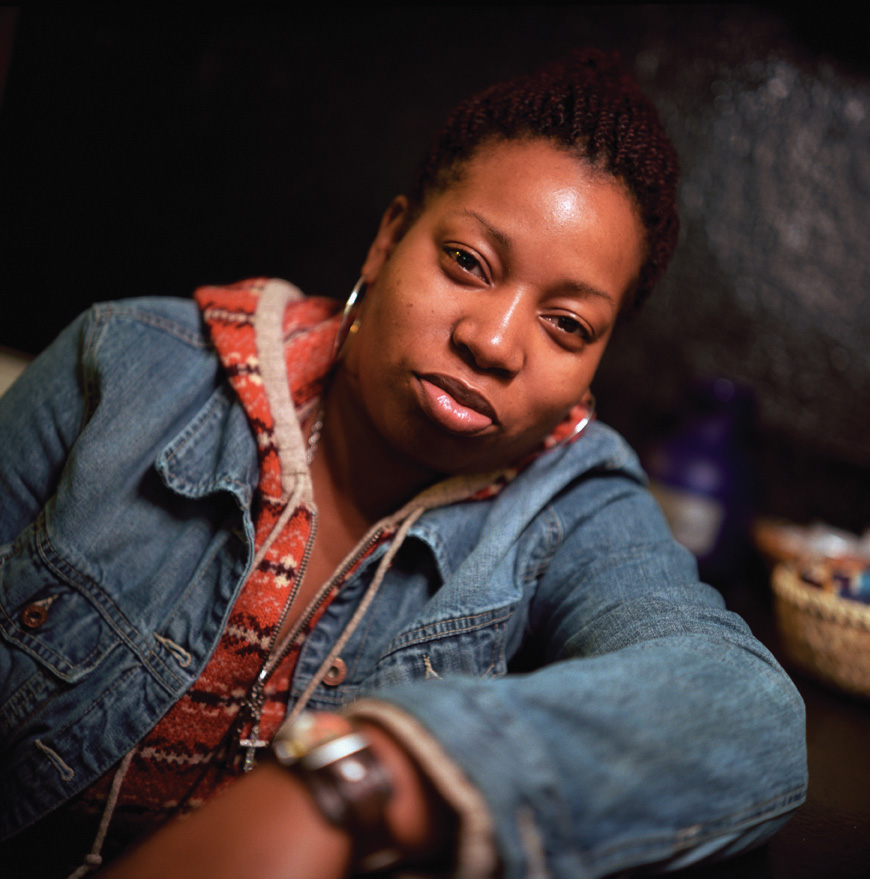
- Bahamadia in 2001

Background information
- Born: Antonia D. Reed; April 22, 1966 (age 60)
- Origin: Philadelphia, Pennsylvania, U.S.
- Genres: Hip hop; alternative hip hop; jazz rap; conscious rap
- Years active: 1990–present
- Labels: Chrysalis; EMI; Good Vibe; E1 Music; E1 Entertainment

Antonia D. Reed (born April 22, 1966), known professionally as Bahamadia, is an American hip hop artist and singer. Bahamadia released her debut album, Kollage, in 1996, followed by the independently released EP BB Queen in 2000. She then released a full-length album, Good Rap Music, in 2005. Bahamadia has also released the singles "Dialed Up Vol. 1" (in 2013), "Here" (in 2015), and "Dialed Up Vol. 2" (in 2018).

Bahamadia has been a featured artist on tracks by musicians including the Roots, Jedi Mind Tricks, Erykah Badu, Morcheeba, Guru, Towa Tei, and Roni Size & Reprezent among others.

In November 2016, Bahamadia appeared as a guest client on season 15 of Project Runway, in which her son, Mah-Jing Wong, was a contestant. His father is part Chinese, part African-American; he was named after his great-grandfather.

== Career ==
Bahamadia attended several high schools in Philadelphia in the 1980s, including University City and Parkway. While still in high school, she began taking hip hop seriously and was influenced by acts such as The Cold Crush Brothers, Schoolly D and Lady B. Around that time, she began performing as a DJ. She gained attention from Guru of Gang Starr in 1993 for her song on the EP Funk Vibes.

== Discography ==
=== Studio albums ===
List of studio albums, with selected chart positions and certifications
Title	Album details	Peak chart positions		
Title	Album details	US	US R&B	US Heat.
Kollage	Released: March 19, 1996 (US); Label: Chrysalis, EMI; Formats: CD, vinyl, digital download	126	13	3
BB Queen	Released: July 25, 2000 (US); Label: Good Vibe; Formats: CD, vinyl, digital download	—	69	35
Good Rap Music	Released: August 15, 2005 (US); Label: B-Girl Freedom; Formats: CD, digital download	—	—	—

=== Singles ===
List of singles, with selected peak chart positions
Title	Year	Chart positions				Album
Title	Year	US Bub.	US Dance Sales	US R&B/HH	US Rap	Album
"Total Wreck"	1994	—	50	—	—	Kollage
"Uknowhowwedu"	1995	5	15	53	17	Kollage
"I Confess"	1996	9	27	45	11	Kollage
"3 tha Hard Way"	1996	—	—	—	—	Kollage
"Biggest Part of Me"	1996	—	—	—	—	Kollage
"Paper Thin"	1996	—	—	—	—	Non-album single
"Special Forces" (featuring Planet Asia, Rasco, Chops and DJ Revolution)	2000	—	—	—	38	BB Queen
"Commonwealth (Cheap Chicks)"	2000	—	—	—	—	BB Queen
"Dialed Up Vol. 1"	2013	—	—	—	—	Non-album singles
"Here"	2015	—	—	—	—	Non-album singles
"Dialed Up Vol. 2"	2018	—	—	—	—	Non-album singles

=== Guest appearances ===
List of non-single guest appearances, with other performing artists, showing year released and album name
Title	Year	Other artist(s)	Album
"Imagination (Imagine Dat-Dis Mix)"	1991	HanSoul	12"
"Proceed Pt. 3"	1994	The Roots	12"
"Back to Love (Much Love Mix)"	1994	The Brand New Heavies, Guru	12"
"Da Ladies in the House"	1995	Big Kap, Da Ladies	12"
"Respect the Architect"	1995	Guru, Ramsey Lewis	Guru's Jazzmatazz, Vol. 2: The New Reality
"Au Natural"	1996	Sweetback	Sweetback
"Push Up Ya Lighter"	1996	The Roots	Illadelph Halflife
"Change Gon Come"	1997	J-Flexx, Con Funk Shun	Gang Related – The Soundtrack
"Keep on Pushin'"	1997	MC Lyte, Yo-Yo, Nonchalant	Dangerous Ground (soundtrack)
"Say Word"	1997	Boogiemonsters	God Sound
"New Forms"	1997	Roni Size & Reprazent	New Forms
"Shiesty"	1997	Ramsquad	Thee Album Regardless
"Happy"	1997	Towa Tei, Yavahn	Sound Museum
"Be OK"	1998	Rah Digga	Lyricist Lounge, Volume One
"Six Pack"	1998	Rah Digga, Nikki D, Heather B, Paula Perry, Precious P	—N/a
"Dos Collabo'	1998	Network Reps, L. Fudge, Mike Zoot, Wizdom	—N/a
"Chaos"	1999	Talib Kweli	Soundbombing II
"When I Shine"	1999	The Herbaliser	Very Mercenary
"Sweet Deja Vu"	1999	Brixx	Everything Happens for a Reason
"Following Goals"	1999	Mathematik	Ecology
"Ecoute Ce Message"	1999	Beedjy	Pile Ou Femme
"Phone Tag (Part 1)"	2000	Spontaneous	Spur of the Moment Music
"Exertions (Remix)"	2000	Jedi Mind Tricks, Virtuoso, Esoteric	Violent by Design
"Good Girl Down"	2000	Morcheeba	Fragments of Freedom
"Countdown"	2000	Spacek	Eve
"Expo Expo"	2001	M-Flo, Towa Tei, Chops	Expo Expo
"Too Much Weight"	2001	Princess Superstar	Princess Superstar Is
"Love of My Life Worldwide"	2003	Erykah Badu, Queen Latifah, Angie Stone	Worldwide Underground
"Transcend"	2003	King Britt	Adventures in Lo-Fi
"B-Girl Session"	2003	Chops	Virtuosity
"High"	2003	Dwele	—N/a
"Gypsy Slang"	2005	Hezekiah	Hurry Now
"Oh!"	2006	Ty, Zion I	Closer
"Feel It"	2007	The Politik	The Politik
"Breathe"	2009	Mr. Lif	I Heard It Today
"Soul Shine"	2009	Soulution	Shine Through
"Do what I Believe"	2009	Statik Selektah	Pre-Game EP
"Special"	2011	Median	The Sender
"Authentic"	2013	Kid Tsu	The Chase
"Hollow"	2015	MELO Collective	Hollow
"Helvetica"	2018	Beem	I Am Safe Secure Encouraged
"Something Like a War"	2019	Kindness	Something Like a War
