= Honest Cowboy =

EP by Stalley
- Released: September 17, 2013
- Recorded: 2012–13
- Genre: Hip hop
- Length: 27:56
- Labels: Maybach; Atlantic
- Producers: DJ Quik; Cardo; The Block Beattaz; Rashad; Terrace Martin

Singles from Honest Cowboy
- 1. "Swangin" Released: March 26, 2013

Honest Cowboy is the first extended play (EP) by American hip hop recording artist Stalley. It was released on September 17, 2013 with seven tracks, under Maybach Music Group and Atlantic Records.

== Background ==
Stalley released his first single "Swangin" featuring hip hop legend Scarface from his Honest Cowboy, was released on March 26, 2013. The music video was released on July 9, 2013 and featured a cameo from Paul Wall. Following the mixtape's August 8, 2013 release it was met with generally positive reviews from critics such as PopMatters. Shortly after it was revealed it received a nomination at the 2013 BET Hip Hop Awards in the "Best Mixtape Category". After receiving a great response from his label he released Honest Cowboy: EP to iTunes on September 17, 2013, the same day as the release of Self Made Vol. 3.

== Track listing ==
No.	Title	Producer(s)	Length
1.	"Spaceships & Woodgrain"	DJ Quik; Cardo (co.)	3:50
2.	"Swangin" (featuring Scarface & Joi Tiffany)	The Block Beattaz	6:06
3.	"Samson"	Rashad	3:23
4.	"The Highest" (featuring Crystal Torres)	The Block Beattaz	3:43
5.	"NineteenEighty7" (featuring Schoolboy Q)	Terrace Martin	3:15
6.	"Sticks and Stones" (featuring Rashad)	Rashad	3:57
7.	"Blue Collar Gang" (featuring Rashad)	Rashad	3:42
Total length:			27:56

- (co.) denotes co-producer

Notes

- "Swangin" contains a samples of "U Send Me Swingin'" by Mint Condition and G-Side's "Swangin", featuring Darrien and The Speed of Sound Choir.

== Chart positions ==
Chart (2013)	Peak position
US Billboard Heatseekers Albums	10
US Top R&B/Hip-Hop Albums (Billboard)	41

== Release history ==
Country	Date	Format	Label
United States	September 17, 2013	Digital download	Maybach Music Group, Atlantic
