= 24 Hour Karate School =

Studio album by Ski Beatz
- Released: September 21, 2010
- Recorded: 2009–2010
- Studio: DD172 Studios (New York, NY)
- Genre: Hip-hop
- Length: 39:40
- Label: DD172
- Producer: Ski Beatz

Ski Beatz chronology
24 Hour Karate School (2010)	24 Hour Karate School 2 (2011)

Singles from 24 Hour Karate School
- 1. "Nothing But Us" Released: August 31, 2010

Professional ratings
Review scores
Source	Rating
HipHopDX	3.5/5
Pitchfork	6/10
Spectrum Culture	2.7/5
Urb	3/5 stars

24 Hour Karate School is the debut solo studio album by American hip-hop producer Ski Beatz. Due to sample clearance issues, the album was set for a March 30, 2010 release, and then was pushed back until September 7, 2010. However, DD172 released the project on September 21, 2010, with distribution via Universal Music Distribution.

Recording sessions took place at DD172 Studios in New York City with Ski, who also served as executive producer together with Dame Dash. The album features guest appearances from Curren$y, Stalley, Tabi Bonney, Camp Lo, Jay Electronica, Jean Grae, Jim Jones, Joell Ortiz, Nikki Wray, Ras Kass, Rugz D Bewler, Smoke DZA, The Cool Kids and Wiz Khalifa. Mos Def was also scheduled to appear on the album, but was removed due to clearance issues.

== Promotion ==
Several videos were shot for the album promotion and can be found at Creative Control and at the home page of Dame Dash's DD172. The leftover song from Curren$y's Pilot Talk, "Nothin' But Us", became the album's lead single with an accompanying music video were done.

== Track listing ==
No.	Title	Writer(s)	Length
1.	"Nothing But Us" (featuring Curren$y and Smoke DZA)	David Willis; Shante Franklin; Sean Pompey	3:28
2.	"Go" (featuring Jim Jones and Curren$y)	Willis; Joseph Jones; Franklin	2:51
3.	"Prowler 2" (featuring Jean Grae, Jay Electronica and Joell Ortiz)	Willis; Tsidi Ibrahim; Timothy Elpadaro Thedford; Joell Ortiz	2:23
4.	"Do It Big!!" (featuring The Cool Kids and Stalley)	Willis; Antoine Reed; Evan Ingersoll; Kyle Myricks	3:33
5.	"S.T.A.L.L.E.Y." (featuring Stalley)	Willis; Myricks	2:24
6.	"Not Like Me" (featuring Tabi Bonney)	Willis; Tabiabuè Bonney	2:59
7.	"Scaling the Building" (featuring Wiz Khalifa and Curren$y)	Willis; Cameron Thomaz; Franklin	3:45
8.	"Super Bad" (featuring Rugz D Bueler)	Willis; D. Mathis	3:36
9.	"I Got Mines" (featuring Tabi Bonney, Nikki Wray, Ras Kass and Stalley)	Willis; Bonney; Nicole Wray; John Austin IV; Myricks	3:54
10.	"Back Uptown" (featuring Camp Lo)	Willis; Salahadeen Wilds; Saladine Wallace	3:09
11.	"Cream of the Planet" (Instrumental)	Willis	4:26
12.	"Taxi" (Instrumental)	Willis	3:12
Total length:			39:40

Notes

- Tracks 3, 11 and 12 supposed to feature vocals by Mos Def.
