= Pilot Talk =

Studio album by Curren$y
- Released: July 13, 2010
- Recorded: 2009–2010
- Genre: Hip-hop
- Length: 42:49
- Label: DD172 (BluRoc)
- Producers: Damon Dash (exec.); Ski Beatz; Nesby Phips; Monsta Beatz; Mos Def; Michael Sterling Eaton

Curren$y chronology
| Jet Files (2009) | Pilot Talk (2010) | Pilot Talk II (2010) |

Singles from Pilot Talk
- 1. "King Kong" Released: April 27, 2010; 2. "Roasted" Released: June 21, 2010

Professional ratings
Review scores
| Source | Rating |
|---|---|
| Allmusic | 4/5 stars |
| Pitchfork Media | (8.4/10) |
| URB | 4.5/5 stars |
| Spin | 7/10 stars |
| AllHipHop.com | 8/10 stars |
| HipHopDX | 3/5 stars |
| PopMatters | 9/10 stars |

Pilot Talk is the third studio album by rapper Curren$y. It was released under Damon Dash's DD172 record label division, BluRoc Records. The album was originally scheduled to be released on March 23, 2010. However, it was later postponed and then given a June 15, 2010 release. The album was then pushed back and released on July 13. The entire album is solely produced by Ski Beatz except "Prioritize", which is produced by Nesby Phips, and "Roasted", which is produced by Monsta Beatz. Ski Beatz also remixed the song "Breakfast" for the album which was originally produced by Mos Def. Several music videos were shot for the album promotion and can be found on CreativeControl.tv.

The album debuted at number 39 on the Billboard 200. It sold just over 10,764 copies its first week. The album is now at 33,000 in total sales.

== Promotion ==
Videos for "Life Under the Scope", "Breakfast", "Address" and "Prioritize" were shot for the album promotion and can be found on CreativeControl.tv. The lead single, "King Kong" was produced by Ski Beatz and released for digital download on April 27, 2010. The music video premiered on DD172's CreativeControl.tv as well as their Vimeo page on May 15, 2010. The video begins with Curren$y driving in his Chevrolet El Camino, playing "Respiration" from the Mos Def & Talib Kweli's Black Star album. Other footage is taken from Curren$y in New Orleans. The video was directed by Jonah Schwartz of Creative Control. The second single, "Roasted", was released for digital download on June 21, 2010, and features Trademark and Young Roddy of Curren$y's Jets International. A music video for the single was released on July 8, 2010. The video was shot in New York at numerous locations including, DD172. A video for the song, Audio Dope II, was released virally on October 12, 2010. The album artwork was created by David Barnett.

== Track listing ==
| No. | Title | Music | Producer(s) | Length |
|---|---|---|---|---|
| 1. | "Example" | * Bass: Brady Watt: Guitar: John Cave; Keyboard: Basil Wajdowicz | Ski Beatz | 2:00 |
| 2. | "Audio Dope II" | * Bass: Brady Watt | Ski Beatz | 4:10 |
| 3. | "King Kong" | | Ski Beatz | 3:00 |
| 4. | "Seat Change" (featuring Snoop Dogg) | * Bass: Brady Watt: Guitar: Sean O'Connell; Backing vocals: McKenzie Eddy | Ski Beatz | 3:51 |
| 5. | "Breakfast" | * Bass: Brady Watt: Guitar: John Cave; Trumpet: Josiah Woodson; Background Vocals: Mos Def | Mos Def; Ski Beatz | 2:49 |
| 6. | "Roasted" (featuring Trademark da Skydiver and Young Roddy) | | Monsta Beatz | 4:25 |
| 7. | "Skybourne" (featuring Big K.R.I.T. and Smoke DZA) | * Bass: Brady Watt: Guitar: John Cave; Backing vocals: Olamide Faison | Ski Beatz | 4:16 |
| 8. | "The Hangover" (featuring Sir Michael Rocks) | * Bass: Brady Watt: Keys: Matt Beilis | Ski Beatz | 3:23 |
| 9. | "The Day" (featuring Jay Electronica and Mos Def) | * Bass: Brady Watt | Ski Beatz | 3:24 |
| 10. | "Prioritize" (featuring Nesby Phips) | | Nesby Phips | 3:13 |
| 11. | "Chilled Coughphee" (featuring Devin the Dude) | * Bass: Brady Watt: Keys: Basil Wajdowicz; Trombone: Alex Asher; Trumpet: Josiah Woodson | Ski Beatz | 2:08 |
| 12. | "Address" (featuring Stalley) | * Bass: Brady Watt | Ski Beatz | 3:06 |
| 13. | "Life Under the Scope" | * Bass: Brady Watt: Keys: Mike Levy | Ski Beatz; Michael Sterling Eaton | 3:04 |
