= DD172 =

Media collective

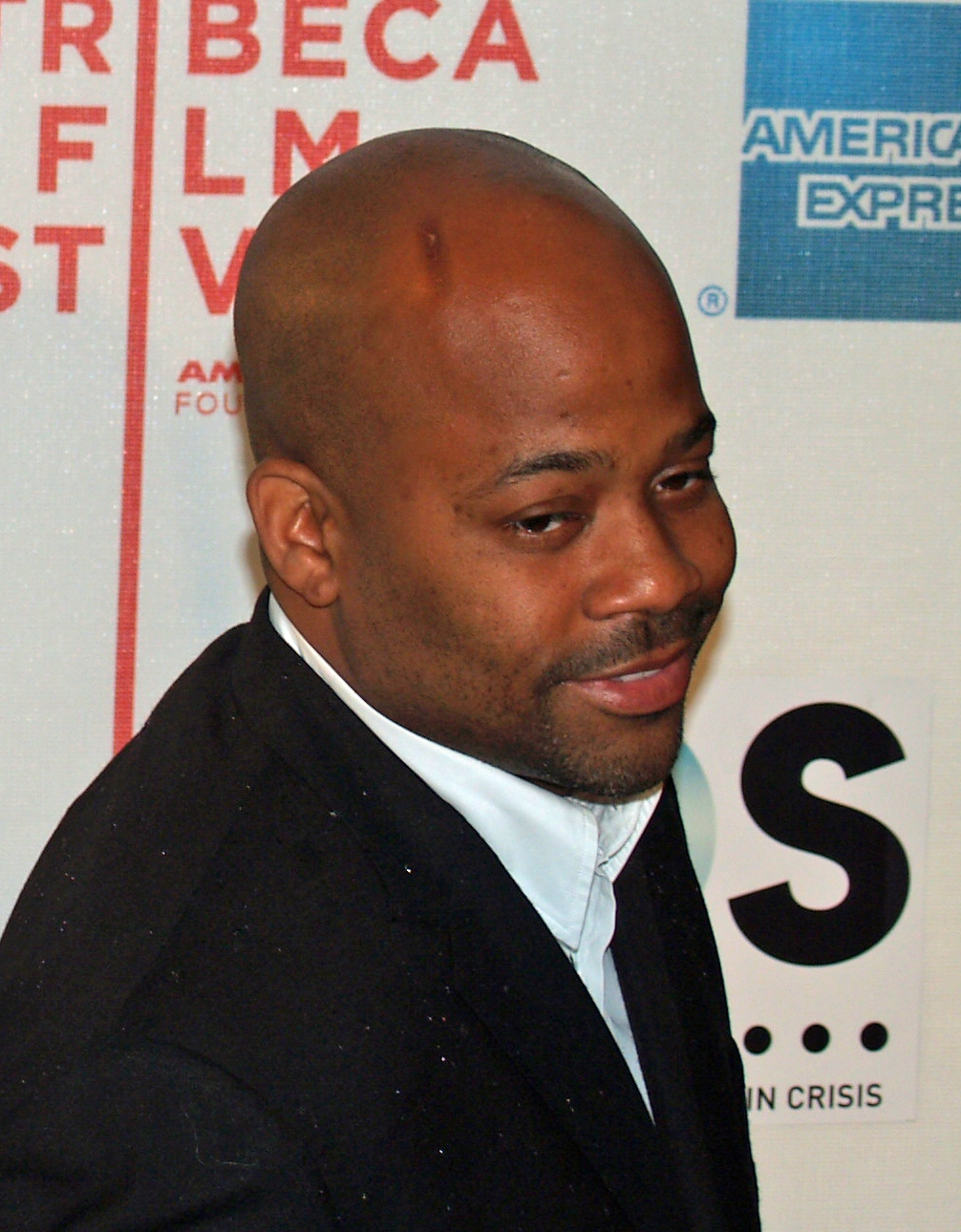
Damon Dash in 2007

DD172 is a media collective founded by American entrepreneur Damon Dash. DD172 encompasses America Nu, a magazine; and VNGRD79, a web design firm. It also includes an art gallery. DD172 is named for Dash's initials and its original street address (172 Duane Street in Tribeca, Lower Manhattan, New York). That building, a rented four-story warehouse, housed the organization until mid-June 2011, at which time DD172 moved out.

== History ==
DD172 began with Dash and two assistants— McKenzie Eddy and Raquel Horn —working on several music projects. Horn then became director of America Nu, while Eddy was charged with running the music division. Eddy, a singer, has also produced music through DD172.

The art gallery, called, "The Dash Gallery," opened on February 19, 2010, and includes paintings and sculptural works by artists such as Bobby Castaneda, Jeremy Wagner, Heather Gargon and Hector Ruiz. In March 2011, DD172 creative directors David Barnett and David Chang opened a clothing store called Local 172 Trading Post in the lobby of Dash's building.

DD172 has produced projects such as Blakroc, a partnership between The Black Keys and several hip-hop artists, including Mos Def, RZA, Jim Jones, and Q-Tip. The rapper Curren$y has also collaborated with various other musicians at DD172, including Thomas Pridgen, Sean O'Connell, and Liam Dirlam of Voodoo Farm (for the album Muscle Car Chronicles); and Mos Def and Jay Electronica, to form the group "Center Edge Territory." Producer Ski Beatz has worked with DD172 as well, naming his first album, 24 Hour Karate School, after a nickname for the organization. Ski Beatz has released other material on DD172's BluRoc Records label, including Love & Rockets, Volume 1: The Transformation (with Murs) in 2011. BluRoc has also worked with Def Jam Recordings to release content.

In June 2011, DD172 departed from the building in Tribeca, which was subsequently occupied by 172 Duane Street Realty. On September 7, 2011, city officials seized the property at 172 Duane Street with papers claiming that alcohol had been sold there without a license since November 2010. However, on September 15, the charges were settled, as Dash left the property several months earlier. His lawyers also denied the allegations of illegal liquor retailing. DD172 had previously been criticized by neighboring tenants as being a public nuisance.
