= Tabi Bonney =

American rapper

- Also known as: Tabi Bonney
- Born: Tabiabuè Bonney
- Origin: Washington, D.C., U.S.
- Genres: Hip hop
- Labels: DD172, BluRoc, EMI

Tabiabuè Bonney, better known as Tabi Bonney, is a Togo-born, Washington, D.C.–based rapper. He is the son of Itadi Bonney, an afro-funk musician popular during the 1970s in Togo and West Africa. Bonney achieved recognition in the Washington metro area with his radio singles "The Pocket" and "Doin It," which featured Raheem DeVaughn. Bonney started a clothing line called Bonney Runway; he has also directed and produced music videos for several artists including friend and fellow D.C.-associated rapper Wale.

== Biography ==
Bonney was born in Lomé, Togo, to musician Itadi Bonney and Jo, a teacher from Washington, D.C. who had been stationed in Lomé through the Peace Corps. Political turmoil in Togo forced the Bonneys to flee the country, and they eventually settled in D.C. Bonney's parents did not wish for him to become a musician. They insisted that he attend college, and he enrolled at Florida A&M University to study pre-med. He earned a Master's degree in biology with plans to become a doctor, but pursued other paths after he realized his heart wasn't in it. He was a science teacher at Roosevelt High School in Petworth, Washington, D.C., for two years after college.

== Music career ==
While in college, Bonney and friend Haziq Ali formed a group called Organized Rhyme. The group opened for artists including LL Cool J, Cam'ron, and OutKast. In 2006, Bonney had a regional breakout hit with "The Pocket," his first single from A Fly Guy's Theme.

In 2011, Bonney released The Summer Years, his fourth studio album, with songs sampling his father's music and featuring Terri Walker and Murs.

== Discography ==
=== Studio albums ===
- A Fly Guy's Theme (2006)
- Dope (2009)
- Fresh (2010)
- The Summer Years (2011)
- Le Bon Voyage (EP) (2018)

=== Mixtapes ===
- A Place Called Stardom (2010)
- Postcards from Abroad (2011)
- Lovejoy Park (2012)
- The Endless Summer (2012)
