= Ski Beatz =

American record producer from North Carolina

- Also known as: DJ Ski; MC Willski
- Born: David Anthony Willis; Greensboro, North Carolina, U.S.
- Genre: Hip hop
- Occupations: Record producer; rapper; songwriter
- Instruments: Percussion; synthesizer; keyboards; bass; turntables
- Years active: 1986–present
- Formerly of: Original Flavor

David Anthony Willis, known professionally as Ski Beatz, is an American record producer from Greensboro, North Carolina, mainly working in hip hop.

== Biography ==
Discovered by DJ Clark Kent, Ski was originally known as "MC Will-Ski" in the late 1980s. He began his recording career in one of North Carolina's first hip hop groups The Bizzie Boyz, alongside Mixmasta "D" (Dana Mitchell, also from NC), Fanatic, and dancers Move & Groove. In the early 1990s, Ski moved to New York City and was a member of the group Original Flavor, the first group managed by future recording industry executive Damon Dash. In the mid-90s, Ski was working on duo Camp Lo's debut album Uptown Saturday Night when Dash called him in to work on the debut album of his own artist, Jay-Z. Jay-Z's album, Reasonable Doubt, was released in 1996, marking Ski's first major production placement. Ski produced four tracks off the album, including the singles "Dead Presidents" and "Feelin' It".

After the critical success of Reasonable Doubt, Ski formed Roc-A-Blok Productions in affiliation with Jay and Dame's label, Roc-A-Fella Records, working with Camp Lo and Sporty Thievz. The producer crafted most of Camp Lo's debut, which dropped in 1997, and produced the Fat Joe single "John Blaze"; Ski continued to work with Jay-Z, on his second album In My Lifetime, Vol. 1 as well as non-solo albums and compilation projects, until 1998, when Jay released his third project Vol. 2... Hard Knock Life without beats from any of his former producers except for DJ Premier.

Though Roc-A-Blok Productions had since folded, Ski remained somewhat active in music. Relocating to his home state of North Carolina for a break from New York City]'s fast-paced lifestyle, he continued producing for artists such as Nature, members of the New Jersey crew The Outsidaz, Lil' Kim, Foxy Brown, Ras Kass and Proof. The producer has also continued to produce for Camp Lo, providing most of the production for their second album Let's Do it Again, as well as their third album, Black Hollywood.

In 2010, Ski linked back up with Dame Dash, joining the entrepreneur's DD172 collective, subsequently nicknamed the 24-Hour Karate School. Since the foundation of the studio enclave, Ski has worked with Mos Def, Jay Electronica, Jean Grae and others. On April 30, 2010, he announced that he would produce upcoming albums for Jean Grae, Joell Ortiz, and Ras Kass, as well as all but three songs on Curren$y's third album Pilot Talk. All of these artists were also later featured on the producer's solo debut, titled 24 Hour Karate School in honor of the collective.

On July 14, 2012, Ski announced he had secured his own label deal, named "The Fresh Air Fund Music Group".

== Discography ==
Studio albums

- 24 Hour Karate School (2010)
- 24 Hour Karate School 2 (2011)
- 24 Hour Karate School Presents: Twilight (2012)

Collaboration albums

- Love & Rockets Vol. 1: The Transformation (with Murs) (2011)
- Embedded (with Locksmith) (2011)
