= Harry Fraud production discography =

The following list is a discography of productions by Harry Fraud, an American record producer and recording artist from New York City, New York. It includes a list of songs produced, co-produced and remixed by year, artist, album and title.

== 2009 ==
=== French Montana - The Laundry Man ===
- 12. "Why So Serious"

=== French Montana - Mac Wit Da Cheese ===
- 04. "New York Minute" (featuring Jadakiss)

== 2010 ==
=== French Montana - Mac & Cheese 2 ===
- 04. "Day Dreaming (Go Hard)"
- 06. "Money Money Money" (featuring Cheeze)
- 08. "So High" (featuring Currensy)
- 11. "New York Minute (Remix)" (featuring Chinx Drugz, Nicki Minaj, Ma$e and Jadakiss)

=== French Montana - Coke Boys ===
- 04. "Dope Man"
- 05. "Lie To Me" (featuring Chinx Drugz and Flip)
- 11. "Crack da Top" (featuring Cheeze)
- 13. "Belong to Me" (featuring Cheeze)
- 14. "We Run NY" (featuring Fat Joe)
- 15. "Goin' In For The Kill" (featuring Chinx Drugz and Cheeze)
- 16. "Hammer Long" (featuring Chinx Drugz, Cheeze and Brock)

== 2011 ==
=== French Montana - Mister 16: Casino Life ===
- 01. "Intro"
- 04. "Ready"
- 11. "Coke Boyz (Middle Fingers Up)" (featuring Chinx Drugz, Flip and Charlie YG)
- 13. "I Think I Luv Her"
- 16. "Soul Food"
- 18. "Shot Caller"
- 20. "Movie"

=== French Montana - Coke Boys 2 ===
- 01. "Ya Mean" (featuring Uncle Murda)
- 03. "Its Just Me" (featuring Cheeze, Chinx Drugz and Flip)
- 07. "Stylin On You" (featuring Chinx Drugz and Flip)
- 08. "Red Light" (featuring Chinx Drugz and Cheeze)
- 09. "Cocaine Mafia" (featuring Trae tha Truth)
- 11. "Roll With Me" (featuring Chinx Drugz)
- 13. "The Rush" (featuring S.A.S.)
- 18. "Tell Me When" (featuring Cheeze and Charlie Rock)

=== Juicy J - Blue Dream & Lean ===
- 22. "Stoner's Night 2" (featuring Wiz Khalifa)

=== French Montana, Juicy J, and Project Pat - Cocaine Mafia ===
- 04. "Do It"
- 16. "Full Of Everything" (featuring Chinx Drugz)

== 2012 ==
=== Wiz Khalifa - Taylor Allderdice ===
- 17. "Blindfolds" (featuring Juicy J)

=== Fat Trel - Nightmare on E St. ===
- 05. "Deep in the Game" (featuring Rick Ross)

=== French Montana - Coke Boys 3 ===
- 17. "Cool Whip" (performed by Charlie Rock and Cheeze)
- 18. "Tap That" (performed by French Montana and Chinx Drugz featuring Stack Bundles)

=== Chevy Woods - Gang Land ===
- 20. "Delonte West"

=== Maybach Music Group - Self Made Vol. 2 ===
- 08. "The Zenith"

=== Meyhem Lauren - Respect the Fly Shit ===
- 01. "Fingerless Driving Gloves" (produced with Tommy Mas)
- 02. "Drug Lords" (featuring AG da Coroner and Action Bronson)
- 05. "Special Effects" (featuring Heems and Action Bronson)
- 06. "BBQ Brisket" (featuring Action Bronson and AG da Coroner)
- 07. "Grown Man Palettes" (featuring Sean Price)
- 09. "Juevos Rancheros" (feat. AG da Coroner, Heems and Riff Raff)
- 10. "Radioactive Tuna" (featuring Smoke DZA, J-Love and Thirstin Howl III)

=== Smoke DZA - K.O.N.Y. ===
- 04. "Butta Rice"

=== Currensy - Priest Andretti ===
- 09. "Payroll" (featuring Young Roddy)

=== Shabaam Sahdeeq - Degrees of Separation ===
- 09. "Futuristic" (featuring Eddie B)

=== Main Attrakionz – Bossalinis & Fooliyones ===
- 09. "Do It for the Bay" (featuring DaVinci)
- 11. "24th Hour"

=== Mr. Muthafuckin' eXquire - Power & Passion ===
- 02. "Cheap Whores & Champagne"

=== French Montana - Mac & Cheese 3 ===
- 01. "Only If for a Night (Intro)"
- 09. "State of Mind"
- 13. "Triple Double" (featuring Mac Miller and Currensy)
- 20. "Mean" (featuring Action Bronson)

== 2013 ==
=== Casey Veggies - Life Changes ===
- 11. "I Love Me Some You"

=== Pusha T - Wrath of Caine ===
- 05. "Road Runner" (featuring Troy Ave)

=== Chinx Drugz - Cocaine Riot 3 ===
- 13. "How Can I Lose"

=== Talib Kweli - Prisoner of Conscious ===
- 13. "Upper Echelon"

=== Currensy and Young Roddy - Bales ===
- 01. "Bales"
- 05. "The War on Drugs"
- 06. "100 Spokes"
- 08. "AD4"

=== The Weeknd - Kiss Land ===
- 01. "Professional" _{(produced with DannyBoyStyles, The Weeknd, and DaHeala)}

=== Flatbush Zombies - BetterOffDEAD ===
- 11. "LiveFromHell"

=== LoLa Monroe - Lipstick & Pistols ===
- 06. "Money on Dey Head" (featuring Juicy J)

=== Troy Ave - New York City: The Album ===
- 10. "Piggy Bank"

=== Chris Webby - Homegrown ===
- 05. "Left Lane"

== 2014 ==
=== French Montana - Coke Boys 4 ===
- 05. "88 Coupes" (featuring Jadakiss)
- 08. "God Body" (featuring Chinx Drugz)

=== Awkword - World View ===
- 03. "Bars & Hooks" (featuring Sean Price, The Kid Daytona and The Incomparable Shakespeare)
- 05. "The People's Champions" (featuring Shabaam Sahdeeq, Punchline and Beretta 9 of Killarmy)

=== Smoke DZA - Dream. Zone. Achieve ===
- 10. "I Don’t Know" (featuring Kobe)
- 12. "Legends In The Making (Ashtray Pt. 2)" (featuring Wiz Khalifa and Currensy)

=== N.O.R.E. - Noreaster ===
- 07. "Cowboys and Indians"

=== Shabaam Sahdeeq - Keepers Of The Lost Art ===
- 08. "Tranquilo"

=== Styles P - Phantom and the Ghost ===
- 10. "For the Best"

=== Riff Raff - Neon Icon ===
- 06. "Lava Glaciers" (featuring Childish Gambino)

=== B-Real and Berner - Prohibition ===
- 07. "Smokers"

=== French Montana - Mac & Cheese: The Appetizer ===
- 01. "Haaan (Max B Speaks)"
- 02. "Poison" (produced with Adrian Lau & The MeKanics)
- 03. "How You Want It"
- 04. "Dontchu"
- 05. "Sweetest Thing"
- 06. "Let You Know"
- 07. "Playing In The Wind II"

=== Rich the Kid - Rich Than Famous ===
- 01. "Rich Than Famous" (Intro)"

== 2015 ==
=== Currensy - Pilot Talk III ===
- 04. "Froze" (featuring Riff Raff)

=== Nacho Picasso - Blunt Raps 2 ===
- 10. "In The Trump"
- 13. "Virtue of Ignorance (Outro)"

=== Rich the Kid - Flexxin on Purpose ===
- 01. "Master P (Intro)"
- 02. "Expensive"

=== Kool A.D. - O.K. ===
- 29. "Shotcaller Freestyle"
- 40. "Jackson Pollock" (feat. Maffew Ragazino)

=== Wiki - Lil Me ===
- 12. "Sunday School Dropout" (featuring Hak)

== 2016 ==
=== French Montana - Wave Gods ===
- 01. "Wave Gods (Intro)" (featuring Chris Brown) _{(produced with The Mekanics and AK47)}

=== Rich the Kid - Trap Talk ===
- 12. "Outro"

=== Meyhem Lauren - Piatto D'oro ===
- 05. "Bonus Round" (featuring Action Bronson, Roc Marciano, and Big Body Bes)

=== Casey Veggies - Customized Greatly Vol. 4: The Return of The Boy ===
- 11. "Perfect Timing"

=== Taylor Gang - TGOD, Volume 1 ===
- 17. "The Man"

=== French Montana - MC4 ===
- 02. "Play Yaself"
- 10. "Brick Road"
- 14. "Chinx & Max / Paid For" (featuring Max B and Chinx) _{(Part 2 produced with The Alchemist and Masar)}

=== Currensy - 12/30 ===
- 11. "Above the Law" (featuring Smoke DZA)

== 2017 ==
=== Playboi Carti - Playboi Carti ===
- 01. "Location"

=== French Montana - Jungle Rules ===
- 04. "A Lie" (featuring The Weeknd and Max B) _{(produced with DaHeala, DannyBoyStyles, and Masar)}
- 07. "Bring Dem Things" (featuring Pharrell) _{(produced with Pharrell)}

=== ASAP Twelvyy - 12 ===
- 08. "Yea Yea Yea (Maps)"

=== Sean Price - Imperius Rex ===
- 09. "The 3 Lyrical Ps" (featuring Prodigy and Styles P)

=== Dave East - Paranoia: A True Story ===
- 08. "Maneuver" (featuring French Montana)

=== Action Bronson - Blue Chips 7000 ===
- 03. "The Chairman's Intent"
- 05. "Bonzai"
- 09. "Let Me Breathe"
- 10. "9-24-7000" (featuring Rick Ross)

=== Smokepurpp - Deadstar ===
- 13. "Count Up" (featuring DRAM)

=== Nacho Picasso - AntiHero Vol. 2 ===
- 02. "Queen of the Damned"
- 03. "Temperature" (featuring ManManSavage) _{(produced with SAT)}
- 04. "Anything" _{(produced with Adrian Lau)}
- 05. "Night" (featuring Mistah F.A.B. and Kobe)
- 07. "Panama Red" (featuring Smoke DZA)
- 09. "Somehow" (featuring Raz Simone)

=== Hopsin - No Shame ===
- 08. "Black Sheep" (featuring Eric Tucker)

== 2018 ==
=== Nacho Picasso - Role Model ===
- 01. "Role Model"
- 03. "Ha Ha"
- 05. "Want It All" (featuring Riff Raff"
- 07. "The Saddest"

=== Rich the Kid - The World Is Yours ===
- 07. "Made It" (featuring Jay Critch and Rick Ross)

=== Westside Gunn - Supreme Blientele ===
- 12. "Spanish Jesus" (featuring Crimeapple)
- 17. "AA Outro" (featuring AA Rashid)

=== Shy Glizzy - Fully Loaded ===
- 01. "Gimme a Hit"

=== Action Bronson - White Bronco ===
- 01. "Dr. Kimble"
- 10. "Ring Ring" (featuring Big Body Bes)
- 11. "Swerve on Em" (featuring ASAP Rocky)

=== Jay Critch - Hood Favorite ===
- 06. "Try It" (featuring French Montana and Fabolous)

=== Warhol.SS - Chest Pains ===
- 03. "Harry Cash"

== 2019 ==
=== Wiz Khalifa and Currensy - 2009 ===
- 14. "Forever Ball"

=== Wiz Khalifa - Fly Times Vol. 1: The Good Fly Young ===
- 08. "Yea Yup" (featuring Young Deji)

=== Rico Nasty - Anger Management ===
- 06. "Relative" _{(produced with Kenny Beats)}

=== French Montana - Montana ===
- 01. "Montana" (produced with Prince 85 and French Montana)
- 02. "Suicide Doors" (featuring Gunna)
- 06. "Salam Alaykum" (produced with Mixx and French Montana)
- 08. "Say Goodbye" (featuring Belly) (produced with Scorp Dezel, Mally Mall, and French Montana)
- 09. "Coke Wave Boys" (featuring Chinx and Max B) (produced with Tony Seltzer)
- 18. "Saucy"

== 2020 ==
=== Jay Worthy - Two4one ===
- 07. "Uncle Brad" (featuring Elcamino)
- 08. "Backpage Freestyle" (featuring Grafh and Daytona)

=== Wiz Khalifa - Big Pimpin' ===
- 09. "Top Down"
- 10. "Good Time" (featuring Young Deji)
- 12. "No Time"
- 17. "Player Shit" (featuring Young Deji)

=== Action Bronson - Only for Dolphins ===
- 02. "C12H16N2"
- 11. "Marcus Aurelius"
- 12. "Hard Target" _{(produced with Yung Mehico)}

=== Jack Harlow - Thats What They All Say ===
- 07. "Keep It Light"

== 2021 ==
=== Jim Jones & Harry Fraud - The Fraud Department ===
- All tracks

=== Currensy - Collection Agency ===
- 3. "Arrival"
- 5. "Jermaine Dupri"

=== Benny the Butcher & Harry Fraud - The Plugs I Met 2 ===
- All tracks
  - 6. "No Instructions" _{(produced with Daringer)}
  - 7. "Longevity" (featuring French Montana and Jim Jones) _{(produced with Tommy Tee)}
  - 8. "Survivor's Remorse" (featuring Rick Hyde) _{(produced with Tony Seltzer)}

=== Wifisfuneral - Smoking Mirrors ===
- 6. "ScratchUrBack"

=== Dave East & Harry Fraud - HOFFA ===
- All tracks

=== Rick Hyde - Plates II ===
- 14. "Enrique" (featuring Meyhem Lauren)

=== Big Body Bes ===
- "Tears of a Tiger"

=== Curren$y & Harry Fraud - Regatta ===
- All tracks

=== French Montana - They Got Amnesia ===
- 12. "Tonight Only

=== Lil Peep & Harry Fraud - High Fashion ===
- All tracks

=== Russ - Chomp 2 ===
- 8. "Top of the World" (featuring Jay Electronica)

=== MadeinTYO & UnoTheActivist - Yokohama ===
- 11. "Jealousy"

== 2022 ==
=== Elcamino - Elcamino 3 ===
- 2. "Money in the Mattress" (featuring 38 Spesh)
- 4. "New Hope" (featuring Jay Worthy)

=== French Montana & Harry Fraud - Montega ===
- All tracks

=== Jay Worthy & Harry Fraud - You Take the Credit, We'll Take the Check ===
- All tracks

=== Flee Lord - Ladies & Gentlemen ===
- 9. "Pardon Me"

=== Cormega - The Realness II ===
- 13. "Man vs. Myth" (narrated by Russell Simmons)

=== Divine - Gunehgar ===
- 6. "Plush"

=== 38 Spesh & Harry Fraud - Beyond Belief ===
- All tracks

== 2023 ==
=== 38 Spesh - Gunsmoke ===
- 7. "Outside" (featuring Flee Lord)

=== 03 Greedo - Halfway There ===
- 28. "Demons Pt 2"

=== Curren$y & Harry Fraud - Vices ===
- All tracks

=== Valee & Harry Fraud - Virtuoso ===
- All tracks

=== Jay Worthy, Kamaiyah & Harry Fraud - THE AM3RICAN DREAM ===
- All tracks

=== Pink Siifu & Turich Benjy - It's Too Quiet..'!! ===
- 5. "Jeff Hamilton..'!!" (featuring Lance Skiiiwalker)

=== RXKNephew & Harry Fraud - Life After Neph ===
- All tracks

== 2024 ==
=== Divine and Karan Aujla - Street Dreams ===
- 2. "Top Class/Overseas"

== 2025 ==
=== Curren$y & Harry Fraud - Never Catch Us ===
- All Tracks

=== Smoke DZA - The Barcelona Tape ===
- 2. "Saquon Barkley"

=== Lord Sko - Piff ===
- 4. "Bong Rips" (feat. MAVI)

=== Westside Gunn - HEELS HAVE EYES ===
- 3. "GORO"

=== Benny the Butcher - Excelsior ===
- 3. "Sign Language"

=== Valee & Harry Fraud - EGONOMICS ===
- All Tracks

=== Brusier Wolf - Potluck ===
- 3. "Air Fryer"
- 9. "Baby By You"

=== Smoke DZA - On My Way To Berlin ===
- 12. "Generational Love" (feat. Killer Mike)

=== Curren$y - 7/30 ===
- 4. "355 Spider"
- 7. "Electric Eyes"

=== Babyface Ray - Codeine Cowboy ===
- 18. "You Just For Me"

=== Zoe Osama - Mr. Nobody ===
- 7. "Oh Yeah!" (feat. Lefty Gunplay)

=== Westside Gunn - HEELS HAVE EYES 2 ===
- 6. "BRIKOLAI VOLKOFF" (feat. Stove God Cooks)

=== Curren$y - 8/30 ===
- 7. "Copperfield Coupe"
- 12. "Bricks n a Boat" (feat. Freeway)

=== Curren$y - 10/15 ===
- 9. "96 Nikes"

=== Dave East - Karma 4 ===
- 17. "Shooter Blocc"

=== Bruiser Wolf & Harry Fraud - Made By Dope ===
- All Tracks

=== Sha Hef & Harry Fraud - GOTTI PACK ===
- All Tracks

== 2026 ==
=== French Montana & Max B - Coke Wave 3.5: Narcos ===
- 3. "Bullet Proof Maybach"
- 10. "Effortless"
