= Smoke DZA discography =

Hip hop discography

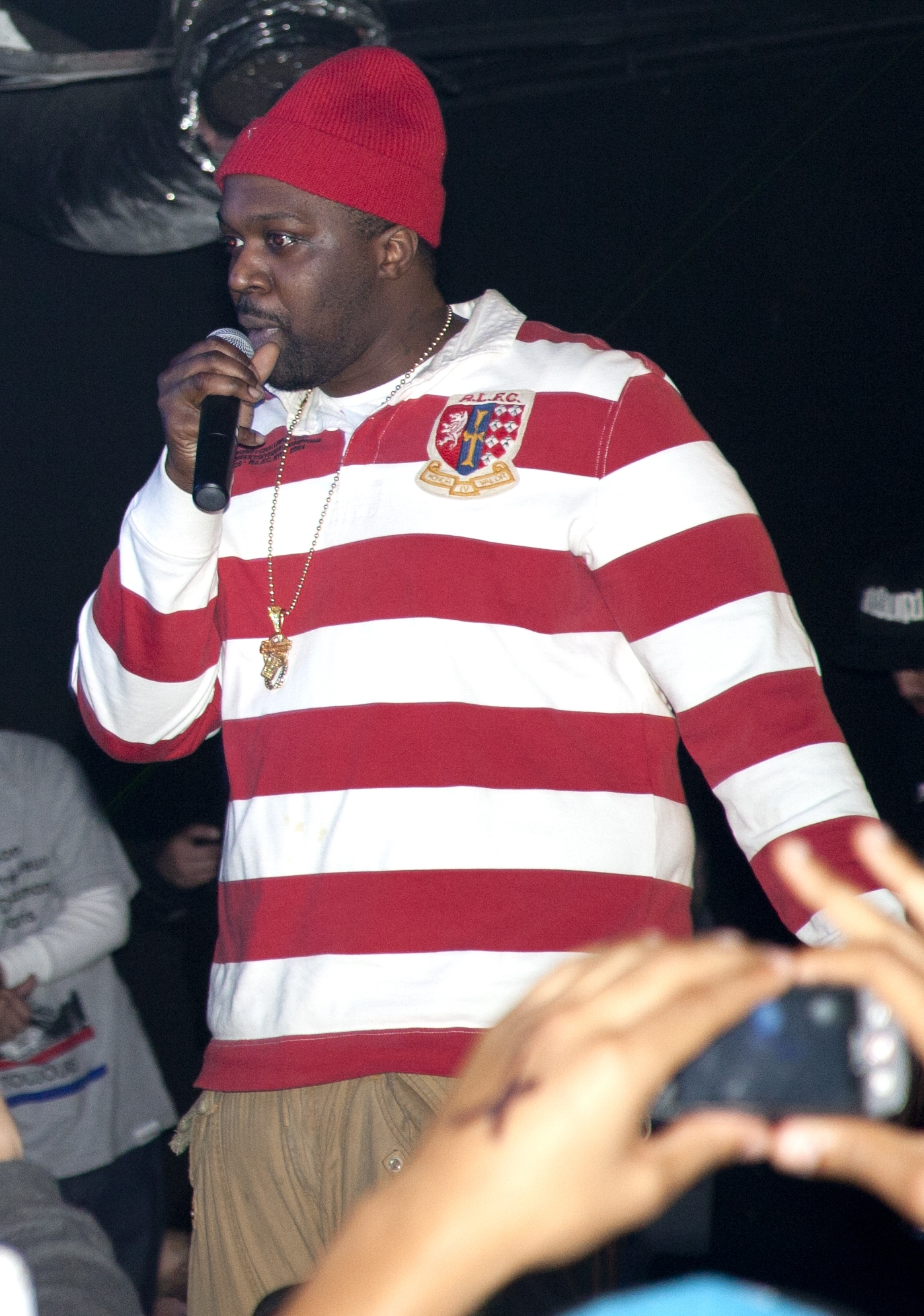
- Studio albums: 8
- Singles: 13
- Mixtapes: 25
- Promotional singles: 1
- Videography: 14

The discography of Smoke DZA, an American hip hop artist, consists of eight studio albums, twenty-five mixtapes, and thirteen singles, (including seven as a featured artist).

== Albums ==
=== Studio albums ===
List of albums, with selected chart positions
| Title | Album details | Peak chart positions | | |
| Title | Album details | US R&B | US Rap | US Heat |
|---|---|---|---|---|
| Rolling Stoned | Released: August 30, 2011; Label: iH2D, iHipHop Distribution; Format: CD, digital download | 65 | — | 29 |
| Rugby Thompson | Released: June 19, 2012; Label: High Times Records, Cinematic; Format: CD, digital download | 45 | — | 13 |
| Dream. Zone. Achieve | Released: April 1, 2014; Label: RFC Music Group, Babygrande Records, Inc.; Format: CD, digital download | 30 | 18 | 5 |
| He Has Risen | Released: March 4, 2016; Label: SRFSCHL; Format: CD, digital download | — | — | 18 |
| Don't Smoke Rock (with Pete Rock) | Released: December 2, 2016; Label: Babygrande Records, Inc.; Format: CD, digital download | 26 | 12 | — |
| Not for Sale | Released: April 20, 2018; Label: Babygrande Records, Inc.; Format: CD, digital download | — | — | — |
| A Closed Mouth Don't Get Fed | Released: February 28, 2020; Label: RFC Music Group, Cinematic; Format: CD, digital download | — | — | — |
| Homegrown | Released: October 2, 2020; Label: RFC Music Group, Cinematic; Format: CD, digital download, streaming | — | — | — |
| Full Court Press (with Girl Talk, Wiz Khalifa, and Big K.R.I.T.) | Released: April 8, 2022; Label: Asylum, Taylor Gang; Format: digital download, streaming | — | — | — |
"—" denotes a title that did not chart, or was not released in that territory.

=== Mixtapes/EPs ===
List of mixtapes, with year released
| Title | Album details |
|---|---|
| Substance Abuse | Released: December 1, 2009; Label: Self-released; Format: Digital download |
| Substance Abuse 1.5: The Headstash | Released: April 20, 2010; Label: Self-released; Format: Digital download |
| George Kush da Button | Released: August 4, 2010; Label: Self-released; Format: Digital download |
| T.H.C. (The Hustler's Catalog) | Released: April 11, 2011; Label: Self-released; Format: Digital download |
| Sweet Baby Kushed God EP | Released: December 24, 2011; Label: Self-released; Format: Digital download |
| Cuz I Felt Like It | Released: April 4, 2012; Label: Self-released; Format: Digital download |
| Substance Abuse (re-release) | Released: June 5, 2012; Label: Self-released; Format: Digital download |
| K.O.N.Y. | Released: October 2, 2012; Label: Self-released; Format: Digital download |
| Ringside (with 183rd) | Released: April 8, 2013; Label: Self-released; Format: Digital download |
| The Stage (with Curren$y & Harry Fraud) | Released: October 30, 2013; Label: Self-released; Format: Digital download |
| Ringside 2 (with 183rd) | Released: April 6, 2014; Label: Self-released; Format: Digital download |
| Ringside 3 (with 183rd) | Released: March 29, 2015; Label: Self-released; Format: Digital download |
| Ringside 4 (with 183rd) | Released: April 3, 2016; Label: Self-released; Format: Digital download |
| George Kush da Button (Don't Pass Trump the Blunt) | Released: May 31, 2016; Label: Self-released; Format: Digital download |
| Ringside 5 (with 183rd) | Released: April 2, 2017; Label: Self-released; Format: Digital download |
| Ringside 6 (with 183rd) | Released: April 8, 2018; Label: Self-released; Format: Digital download |
| Uptown (with 183rd) | Released: January 18, 2019; Label: Self-released; Format: Digital download |
| Prime Location Vol. 1 | Released: February 27, 2019; Label: Self-released; Format: Digital download |
| Two Packs (with Pounds) | Released: March 19, 2019; Label: Self-released; Format: Digital download |
| Ringside 7 (with 183rd) | Released: April 9, 2019; Label: Self-released; Format: Digital download |
| Bacon Egg and Trees | Released: April 19, 2019; Label: Self-released; Format: Digital download |
| Prime Location Vol. 2 | Released: May 4, 2019; Label: Self-released; Format: Digital download |
| Zour (with Green R. Fieldz) | Released: August 9, 2019; Label: RFC, The Smoker's Club, Cinematic; Format: Digital download |
| Statue of Limitations (with Benny the Butcher) | Released: October 18, 2019; Label: RFC, Black Soprano Family, Griselda, Cinematic; Format: Digital download |
| Prestige Worldwide (with Curren$y) | Released: November 29, 2019; Label: RFC, Jet Life, Cinematic; Format: Digital download |
| Ringside 8 (with 183rd) | Released: April 6, 2020; Label: Self-released; Format: Digital download |
| Worldwide Smoke Session (with The Smokers Club) | Released: April 20, 2020; Label: Smokers Club, RFC, Cinematic; Format: Digital download |
| R.F.C (Money Is the Motive), Pt. 1 (with Nym Lo, Jayy Grams, 183rd, & OT the Real) | Released: January 8, 2021; Label: RFC; Format: Digital download |
| The Hustler's Catalog 2 | Released: June 4, 2021; Label: RFC, Cinematic; Format: Digital download |
| Thanks Again (with 183rd and Nym Lo) | Released: August 20, 2021; Label: RFC; Format: Digital download |
| Mood Swings (with Real Bad Man) | Released: February 4, 2022; Label: Real Bad Man, RFC; Format: Digital download |
| Driplomatic Immunity (with 183rd and Nym Lo) | Released: March 4, 2022; Label: RFC; Format: Digital download |
| Respecanize Vol. 1 | Released: August 26, 2022; Label: RFC; Format: Digital download |
| Respecanize Vol. 2 | Released: September 9, 2022; Label: RFC; Format: Digital download |
| 10,000 HRS | Released: October 14, 2022; Label: RFC; Format: Digital download |
| Money for Dummies (with The Smokers Club) | Released: December 30, 2022; Label: RFC; Format: Digital download |
| Worldwide Smoke Session, Vol. 2 (with The Smokers Club) | Released: May 19, 2023; Label: RFC; Format: Digital download |
| Flying Objects (with Flying Lotus) | Released: September 1, 2023; Label: Smoker's Club; Format: Digital download |
| You're All Welcome (with DJ RellyRell) | Released: May 24, 2024; Label: RFC; Format: Digital download |
| You're All Welcome (Deluxe) (with DJ RellyRell) | Released: June 28, 2024; Label: RFC; Format: Digital download |
| THC3 (Kushedgod Bitch) | Released: August 30, 2024; Label: Smoker's Club; Format: Digital download |
| The Barcelona Tape | Released: March 18, 2025; Label: RFC Music Group; Format: Digital download |
| On My Way to Berlin | Released: July 3, 2025; Label: RFC Music Group; Format: Digital download |
| Uptown Saturday Night (with the Musalini and John Dutch) | Released: March 13, 2026; Label: DMG; Format: Digital download |
| Road Trip to Amsterdam | Released: June 1, 2026; Label: RFC Music Group; Format: Digital download |
| Trees Open Doors EP (with Memphis Bleek) | Released: May 14, 2026; Label: RFC Music Group; Format: Digital download |
| We Outside EP (with Mike & Keys) | Released: November 2, 2026; Label: RFC Music Group; Format: Digital download |

== Singles ==
=== As lead artist ===
List of singles, showing year released and album name
| Title | Year | Album |
|---|---|---|
| "On the Corner" (featuring Bun B and Big K.R.I.T.) | 2011 | Rolling Stoned |
| "4 Loko" (featuring ASAP Rocky) | 2011 | Rolling Stoned |
| "Pow Wow" (featuring Dom Kennedy) | 2011 | Rolling Stoned |
| "New Jack" | 2012 | Rugby Thompson |
| "Butta Rice" (with Harry Fraud) | 2013 | —N/a |
| "Legends In the Making (Ashtray, Pt. 2)" (featuring Wiz Khalifa and Currensy) | 2013 | Dream.ZONE.Achieve |

=== As featured artist ===
List of singles, showing year released and album name
| Title | Year | Album |
|---|---|---|
| "No Wheaties" (Big K.R.I.T. featuring Currensy and Smoke DZA) | 2010 | K.R.I.T. Wuz Here |
| "Nothing But Us" (Ski Beatz featuring Smoke DZA and Currensy) | 2010 | 24 Hour Karate School |
| "Weed" (Blaze Burna featuring Devin the Dude and Smoke DZA) | 2012 | Non-album single |
| "Twisting Facts" (Rob I.E. featuring Chevy Woods and Smoke DZA) | 2012 | Non-album single |
| "When I Want'" (Mookie Jones featuring Smoke DZA) | 2012 | Non-album single |
| "Like a Rasta (Snyp Luciano featuring Smoke DZA) | 2013 | Non-album single |
| "Pop It Off (Remix)" (Spragga Benz featuring Smoke DZA and Sierra Leone) | 2014 | Non-album single |
| "Highest Bidder" (Switch featuring Smoke DZA) | 2020 | Non-album single |

=== Promotional single ===
| Title | Year | Album |
|---|---|---|
| "4 Loko (Remix)" (featuring ASAP Rocky, ASAP Twelvy, Danny Brown, Killa Kyleon and Freeway) | 2012 | Sweet Baby Kushed God |

== Guest appearances ==
List of non-single guest appearances, with other performing artists, showing year released and album name
| Title | Year | Other artist(s) | Album |
|---|---|---|---|
| "Dream" | 2009 | Shiest Bubz | —N/a |
| "No Wheaties" | 2010 | Big K.R.I.T., Currensy | K.R.I.T. Wuz Here |
| "Skybourne" | 2010 | Currensy, Big K.R.I.T. | Pilot Talk |
| "Purple Sowa" | 2010 | Shiest Bubz | —N/a |
| "Nothing But Us" | 2010 | Ski Beatz, Currensy | 24 Hour Karate School |
| "Type of Cat" | 2011 | Fiend, Big Sant | Life Behind Limo Glass |
| "We What's Happening" | 2011 | Fiend, Big K.R.I.T. | Tennis Shoes And Tuxedos |
| "Cherry Pie" | 2011 | Rich Hil | 500 Grams |
| "All In My Mind" | 2011 | Jae Millz, Gudda Gudda | Property of Potentness EP |
| "Winning" | 2011 | Mookie Jones | P.Laya A.Ss N.Igga |
| "Rowland" | 2012 | Wiz Khalifa | Taylor Allderdice |
| "Life Instructions" | 2012 | Currensy | Covert Coup |
| "J.L.R" | 2012 | Currensy, Young Roddy | The Stoned Immaculate |
| "Mirrors" | 2012 | Currensy | Cigarette Boats |
| "K.U.S.H." | 2012 | T. Mills | Thrillionaire |
| "Power Ballad" | 2012 | Domo Genesis | No Idols |
| "Perrier & Rosé" | 2012 | Nakim | YNWA+S |
| "Freaks" (Remix) | 2012 | Mookie Jones | —N/a |
| "Smoke Good, Live Good" | 2012 | THEBLKHANDS, Fenix | —N/a |
| "Grind And Put In" | 2012 | H-Man | —N/a |
| "Blue Room" | 2012 | Al-Doe, Chase N. Cashe | —N/a |
| "Goodness Gracious" | 2012 | Willie the Kid | —N/a |
| "dontmissthisjethoe" | 2012 | Corner Boy P, Young Roddy | Money Neva Sleep 2 |
| "Hypnotized" | 2013 | Dubb | —N/a |
| "You Ain't On It" | 2013 | Chase N. Cashe | —N/a |
| "Underground Airplay" | 2013 | Joey Badass, Big K.R.I.T. | Underground Airplay |
| "From Da Soul" | 2013 | Wink Loc, Peter Tambaskis, Preme da Prez | Locomotive 3 |
| "The Price is Right" | 2013 | Fiend | Lil Ghetto Boy |
| "3 The Hardway" | 2013 | Young Roddy, Styles P | Good Sense 2 |
| "Weight" | 2013 | Mazzi, N.O.R.E. | —N/a |
| "Only One" | 2013 | Big K.R.I.T., Wiz Khalifa | K.R.I.T. (King Remembered In Time) |
| "Niggas 4 Life" | 2013 | Funkmaster Flex | Who You Mad At? Me or Yourself? |
| "When I Was Young" | 2013 | Jon Connor, Chris Webby | Unconscious State |
| "So Beautiful" | 2013 | Jae Millz | Property Of Potentness 2 |
| "Money Team" | 2013 | Larry Fisherman, Ab-Soul, Dash | S.H.O.W.TIME |
| "Death Before Dishonor" | 2013 | SBOE, Big K.R.I.T. | All We Got Is Us |
| "Old Chanel" | 2013 | Wiz Khalifa | —N/a |
| "Pardon Me" | 2013 | Vado, Currensy | Slime Flu 4 |
| "HighLife" | 2013 | MellowHigh, Currensy | MellowHigh |
| "Minds of the Future" | 2015 | Brady Watt | Lifetronics |
| "Scorpion Death Drop" | 2016 | The Sparks Foundation, Project Pat, A$AP Twelvyy, Trae The Truth | Parts Unknown |
| "Mr. Fuji" | 2016 | Westside Gunn, Conway | Hitler Wears Hermes IV |
| "Basquiat" | 2019 | Bun B, Statik Selektah, Fat Joe | TrillStatik |
| "Frank Murphy" | 2020 | Westside Gunn, Stove God Cooks, Estee Nack, El Camino, Flee Lord | Who Made The Sunshine |

== Videography ==
| Title | Year | Director(s) |
|---|---|---|
| "Smoke-n-Dope" (featuring Curt@!ns) | 2010 | Treezy (Visually Inklined) |
| "Divine Music" | 2010 | Sam Rogers, Kory Smith, Treezy (Visually Inklined) |
| "Continental Kush Breakfast" | 2010 | Treezy (Visually Inklined) |
| "Marley and Me" | 2010 | Coodie & Chike (Creative Control) |
| "The World" | 2011 | John Colombo |
| "Always Been" (featuring Mac Miller) | 2011 | Tony Billz, Steve-Ography |
| "Gotta Get Paid" (featuring Big K.R.I.T.) | 2011 | Joseph Zentil |
| "4 Loko" (featuring ASAP Rocky) | 2011 | Kory Smith, Cristopher Schafer (Visually Inklined) |
| "Loaded" | 2011 | Samuel Rogers |
| "Christmas in the Trap" | 2011 | Slick Jackson |
| "Money Down" (featuring P-IC) | 2012 | Slick Jackson |
| "New Jack" | 2012 | Nicolas Heller |
| "Hearses" (featuring Ab-Soul) | 2014 | Goldrush |
| "Stoners" (Nina Sky featuring Smoke DZA) | 2014 | Blizzedout, Feebzz |
