= French Montana discography =

Hip hop recording artist discography

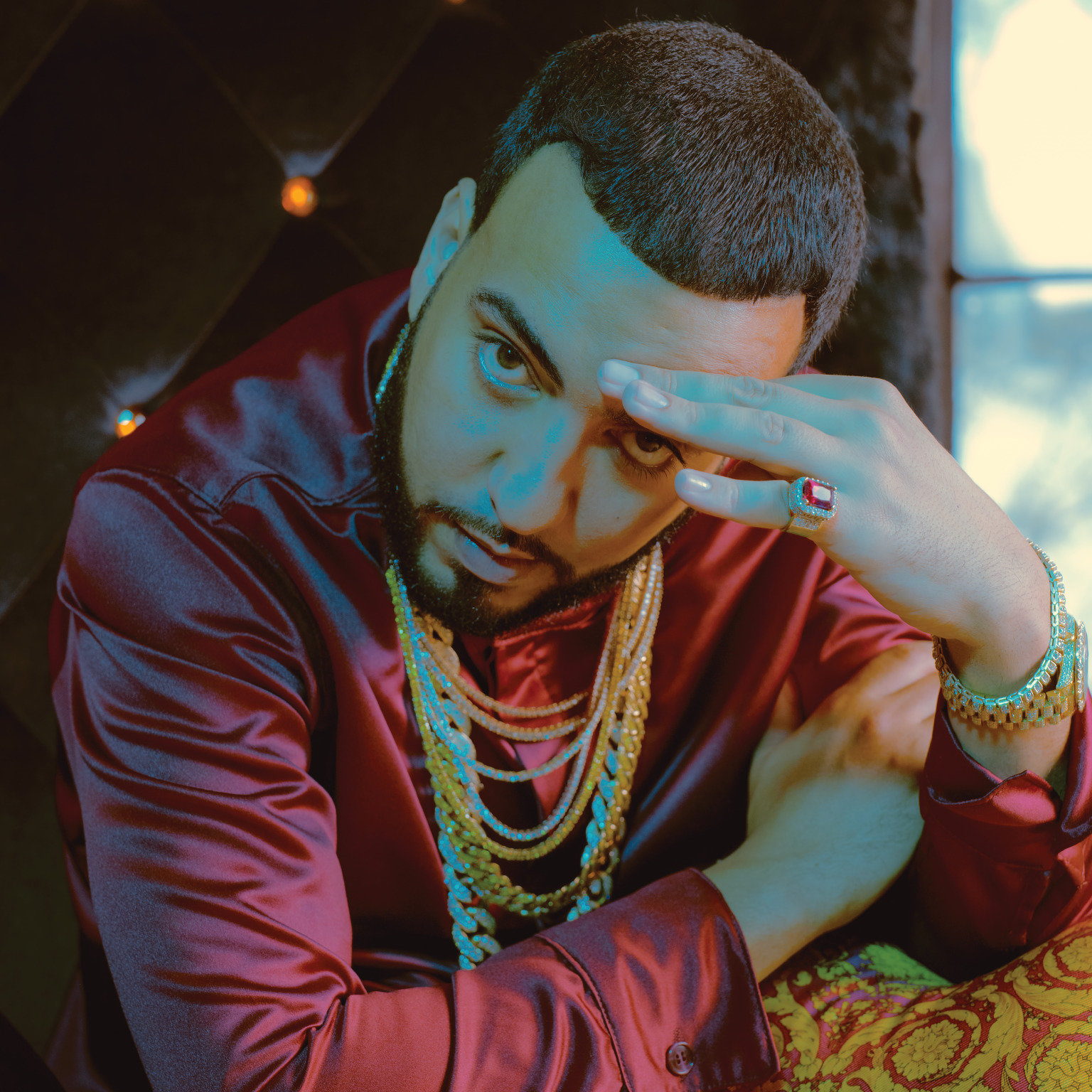
- French Montana in 2017
- Studio albums: 4
- Singles: 51
- Music videos: 32
- Featured artist singles: 57
- Mixtapes: 26
- Guest appearances: 187

The discography of Moroccan-American rapper French Montana consists of four studio albums, one collaborative album, twenty-six mixtapes, 51 singles as a lead artist, 57 singles as a featured artist, 32 music videos and 18 promotional singles.

French Montana first gained notoriety in his native the Bronx as the creator of the DVD series Cocaine City, a locally-oriented series loosely based on Smash DVD, for which it is an aesthetic tribute. Debuting in 2002, the series focused on hip hop-based interviews with artists including 50 Cent, Jeezy, and the Diplomats, and often served to instigate local feuds and rivalries. The series ran until 2010, and he used the recognition to severally promote his career as a recording artist, which was its ultimate intention. His debut mixtape, The French Revolution was released in 2007. He became acquainted with Senegalese-American singer Akon in 2008 prior to joining his record label, Konvict Muzik the following year as a "shopping artist." His tenure on the label proved to be short-lived, as Akon failed to come to mutual terms with the rapper and its parent label, Interscope Records.

Meanwhile, French Montana persisted in his recording career and amassed a number of mixtapes. His tenth, Coke Boys (2010) spawned the local hit single "Choppa Choppa Down" (featuring Waka Flocka Flame). His eleventh mixtape, Mister 16: Casino Life (2011) contained his future hit song "Shot Caller" (featuring Charlie Rock). Prior to its commercial release, he became acquainted with prominent Miami rapper Rick Ross—as Montana's music began gaining traction in that area—as well as Puff Daddy—whose song "It's All About the Benjamins" is referenced on "Shot Caller," while also being a frequenter of the Miami area. Both Ross and Puff Daddy appeared on the official remix of the song, and by December of that year, Montana signed to Combs' Bad Boy Records in a joint venture with Ross' Maybach Music Group; both labels were under Universal Music Group, and the contract was under the aegis of the former label's distributor, Interscope Records. The following month, "Shot Caller" was issued as his debut commercial single, and it soon marked his first entry on the Hot R&B/Hip-Hop Songs and Hot Rap Songs charts.

While his debut studio album was scheduled for release in May 2012, it suffered numerous delays. Its first single, "Pop That" (featuring Drake, Rick Ross and Lil Wayne) was released the following month and became his first entry on the Billboard Hot 100—at number 36. The song also received double platinum certification by the Recording Industry Association of America, and was followed by "Freaks" (featuring Nicki Minaj), released in February 2013 and the similarly successful "Ain't Worried About Nothin'" in April; all three served as promotion for Excuse My French (2013), which peaked at number four on the Billboard 200 and saw generally negative critical reception. He released a number of commercially-oriented singles in the following three years—including the gold-certified "Bad Bitch" (featuring Jeremih), and the platinum-certified "Lockjaw" (featuring Kodak Black) and "No Shopping" (featuring Drake)—to mild success, each receiving placement on retail mixtapes. His 2017 single, "Unforgettable" (featuring Swae Lee) saw his furthest commercial success and peaked at number three on the Billboard Hot 100.

== Albums ==
=== Studio albums ===
List of studio albums, with selected chart positions and certifications
Title	Album details	Peak chart positions							Certifications
Title	Album details	US	US R&B/HH	US Rap	AUS	CAN	SWE	UK	Certifications
Excuse My French	Released: May 21, 2013; Label: Coke Boys, Maybach, Bad Boy, Interscope; Format: CD, digital download	4	1	1	—	11	—	78	RIAA: Platinum
Jungle Rules	Released: July 14, 2017; Label: Coke Boys, Bad Boy, Epic; Format: CD, digital download	3	3	3	67	2	14	33	RIAA: Platinum; MC: Platinum; IFPI DEN: Gold; IFPI SWI: Gold
Montana	Released: December 6, 2019; Label: Coke Boys, Bad Boy, Epic; Format: Digital download, streaming	25	14	10	—	23	—	—	RIAA: Gold; MC: Gold
They Got Amnesia	Released: November 19, 2021; Label: Coke Boys, Bad Boy, Epic; Format: Digital download, streaming	59	23	17	—	51	—	—	

=== Collaborative albums ===
List of collaboration albums, with selected chart positions
Title	Album details	Peak chart positions	
Title	Album details	US	US R&B/HH
Montega (with Harry Fraud)	Released: June 24, 2022; Label: Coke Boys; Format: Digital download, streaming	46	22
Wave Gods 2: Cosmos Brothers (with Max B)	Released: May 22, 2026; Label: Coke Boys; Format: Digital download, streaming	-	-

== Mixtapes ==
List of mixtapes, with selected chart positions
Title	Mixtape details	Peak chart positions	
Title	Mixtape details	US	US R&B/HH
French Revolution Vol. 1	Released: September 4, 2007; Label: Self-released; Format: Digital download	—	—
Live from Africa	Released: May 3, 2008; Label: Cocaine City Records; Format: Digital download	—	—
Coke Wave (with Max B)	Released: February 6, 2009 (US); Label: Cocaine City Records, DJ Whoo Kid; Format: Digital download, CD/DVD	—	—
The Laundry Man	Released: February 24, 2009; Label: Cocaine City Records, Big Mike, Evil Empire; Format: Digital download	—	—
Mac Wit Da Cheese	Released: April 19, 2009; Label: Cocaine City Records, Big Mike; Format: Digital download	—	—
The Laundry Man 2	Released: June 29, 2009 (US); Label: Cocaine City Records, Evil Empire; Format: Digital download	—	—
Cocaine Konvicts (with DJ Drama)	Released: September 25, 2009; Label: Coke Boys, Konvict Muzik; Format: Digital download	—	—
Coke Wave 2 (with Max B)	Released: November 6, 2009; Label: Cocaine City Records, GainGreene; Format: Digital download, CD/DVD	—	—
Mac & Cheese 2	Released: May 6, 2010 (US); Label: Coke Boys, Big Mike, DJ Self, Evil Empire; Format: Digital download	—	—
Coke Boys	Released: September 15, 2010 (US); Label: Coke Boys, DJ Drama, DJ Lust, DJ Diggz; Format: Digital download	—	—
Mister 16: Casino Life	Released: February 15, 2011; Label: Coke Boys, DJ Holiday; Format: Digital download	—	—
Coke Boys 2 (with Coke Boys)	Released: August 19, 2011 (US); Label: Coke Boys, Evil Empire; Format: Digital download	—	—
Lock Out (with Waka Flocka Flame)	Released: December 14, 2011 (US); Label: Coke Boys, DJ Drama, DJ Green Lantern; Format: Digital download	—	—
Cocaine Mafia (with Juicy J and Project Pat)	Released: December 20, 2011 (US); Label: Coke Boys, Evil Empire; Format: Digital download	—	—
Coke Boys 3 (with Coke Boys)	Released: April 13, 2012; Label: Coke Boys, Evil Empire; Format: Digital download	—	—
Mac & Cheese 3	Released: November 19, 2012; Label: Coke Boys, Big Mike, Evil Empire; Format: Digital download	—	—
Coke Boys 4 (with Coke Boys)	Released: January 2, 2014; Label: Coke Boys, Evil Empire; Format: Digital download	—	—
The Appetizer (with Harry Fraud)	Released: December 19, 2014; Label: Coke Boys, Bad Boy, MMG, Interscope; Format: Digital download	—	—
Casino Life 2: Brown Bag Legend	Released: May 8, 2015; Label: Coke Boys, Bad Boy, MMG, Interscope; Format: Digital download	—	—
Coke Zoo (with Fetty Wap)	Released: October 26, 2015; Label: Coke Boys, RGF, Maybach Music Group; Format: Digital download	—	—
Wave Gods	Released: February 19, 2016; Label: Coke Boys, MMG; Format: Digital download	—	—
MC4	Released: November 5, 2016; Label: Coke Boys, Bad Boy, Epic, Maybach Music; Format: Bootleg, CD, digital download	—	—
Coke Wave 4 (with Max B)	Released: July 10, 2019; Label: Coke Boys, Bad Boy; Format: Digital download, streaming	—	—
CB5	Released: November 20, 2020; Label: Montana Entertainment, Coke Boys, Bad Boy, Empire; Format: Digital download, streaming	51	26
Coke Boys 6 (with DJ Drama)	Released: January 6, 2023; Label: Coke Boys; Format: Digital download, streaming	11	6
Mac & Cheese 5	Released: February 23, 2024; Label: Coke Boys; Format: Digital download, streaming	14	5
Coke Wave 3.5: Narcos (with Max B)	Released: January 9, 2026; Label: Coke Boys; Format: Digital download	—	—

== Singles ==
=== As lead artist ===
List of singles as lead artist, with selected chart positions and certifications, showing year released and album name
Title	Year	Peak chart positions										Certifications	Album
Title	Year	US	US R&B/HH	US Main. R&B/HH	AUS	CAN	DEN	NZ	SWE	SWI	UK	Certifications	Album
"Shot Caller"	2011	— (Note: "Shot Caller" did not enter the Billboard Hot 100, but peaked at number 24 on the Bubbling Under Hot 100 Singles chart.)	39	22	—	—	—	—	—	—	—		Mister 16: Casino Life
"Pop That" (featuring Rick Ross, Drake, and Lil Wayne)	2012	36	2	2	—	—	—	—	—	—	—	RIAA: 2× Platinum; MC: Platinum	Excuse My French
"Freaks" (featuring Nicki Minaj)	2013	77	25	20	—	—	—	—	—	—	—	RIAA: Gold	Excuse My French
"Ain't Worried About Nothin'"	2013	63	18	9	—	—	—	—	—	—	—	RIAA: Platinum	Excuse My French
"Don't Panic"	2014	—	37	24	—	—	—	—	—	—	—		Non-album singles
"Bad Bitch" (featuring Jeremih)	2014	95	29	32	—	—	—	—	—	—	—	RIAA: Gold	Non-album singles
"Off the Rip" (featuring Chinx and N.O.R.E.)	2015	—	—	—	—	—	—	—	—	—	—		Casino Life 2: Brown Bag Legend
"Lose It" (featuring Rick Ross and Lil Wayne)	2015	—	—	—	—	—	—	—	—	—	—		Non-album single
"Moses" (featuring Chris Brown and Migos)	2015	—	51	18	—	—	—	—	—	—	—		Casino Life 2: Brown Bag Legend
"Figure It Out" (featuring Kanye West and Nas)	2016	—	54	—	—	—	—	—	—	—	—		Wave Gods and MC4
"Lockjaw" (featuring Kodak Black)	2016	73	24	34	—	—	—	—	—	—	—	RIAA: 2× Platinum; MC: Platinum	Wave Gods, MC4 and Montana
"No Shopping" (featuring Drake)	2016	36	12	35	—	25	—	—	—	—	—	RIAA: Platinum; MC: Platinum	MC4 and Montana
"Cookin" (with Fat Joe and Remy Ma featuring RySoValid)	2016	—	—	—	—	—	—	—	—	—	—		Plata o Plomo
"Said N Done" (featuring ASAP Rocky)	2016	—	—	—	—	—	—	—	—	—	—		MC4
"XPlicit" (featuring Miguel)	2016	—	—	—	—	—	—	—	—	—	—		MC4
"Have Mercy" (featuring Beanie Sigel, Jadakiss, and Styles P)	2016	—	—	—	—	—	—	—	—	—	—		MC4
"2 Times"	2016	—	—	—	—	—	—	—	—	—	—		MC4
"Brick Road"	2016	—	—	—	—	—	—	—	—	—	—		MC4
"Chinx & Max / Paid For" (featuring Max B and Chinx)	2016	—	—	—	—	—	—	—	—	—	—		MC4
"No Pressure" (featuring Future)	2017	—	—	—	—	—	—	—	—	—	—		Jungle Rules
"Unforgettable" (featuring Swae Lee)	2017	3	2	2	7	3	6	6	5	9	2	RIAA: 11× Platinum; ARIA: 13× Platinum; BPI: 7× Platinum; IFPI DEN: 2× Platinum; IFPI SWE: 4× Platinum; IFPI SWI: 4× Platinum; MC: Diamond; RMNZ: 7× Platinum; SNEP: Diamond	Jungle Rules
"A Lie" (featuring the Weeknd and Max B)	2017	75	31	—	71	30	—	— (Note: "A Lie" did not enter the NZ Top 40 Singles Chart, but peaked at number four on the NZ Heatseeker Singles Chart.)	—	80	51	MC: Platinum	Jungle Rules
"Hurtin' Me" (with Stefflon Don)	2017	— (Note: "Hurtin' Me" did not chart on the Billboard Hot 100 chart, though did peak at number 19 on the Bubbling Under Hot 100 Singles chart.)	—	19	—	—	—	—	—	—	7	BPI: 2× Platinum; MC: Gold; SNEP: Gold; RMNZ: Platinum	Hurtin' Me - The EP
"Phases" (with Alma)	2017	—	—	—	—	—	—	—	82	97	88		Non-album singles
"Boom Boom" (with RedOne, Daddy Yankee, and Dinah Jane)	2017	—	—	—	—	—	—	—	—	90	—		Non-album singles
"Famous" (solo or featuring Adam Levine)	2017	—	—	32	—	—	—	—	—	—	—	MC: Gold	Jungle Rules
"Olha a Explosão (Remix)" (with Kevinho, 2 Chainz, and Nacho)	2018	—	—	—	—	—	—	—	—	—	—	RIAA: Platinum (Latin)	Non-album single
"Welcome to the Party" (with Diplo and Lil Pump featuring Zhavia Ward)	2018	84	—	—	87	99	—	—	—	—	—	RIAA: Platinum; BPI: Silver; RMNZ: Gold	Deadpool 2
"First Time" (with Liam Payne)	2018	—	—	—	—	—	—	—	—	—	—		First Time
"No Stylist" (featuring Drake)	2018	47	22	20	69	16	—	— (Note: "No Stylist" did not enter the NZ Top 40 Singles Chart, but peaked at number eight on the NZ Hot Singles Chart.)	54	36	19	RIAA: 2x Platinum; BPI: Platinum; MC: 3× Platinum; RMNZ: Gold	No Stylist and Montana
"Pose to Do" (featuring Lil Pump and Quavo)	2019	—	—	—	—	—	—	—	—	—	—		Non-album single
"Slide" (featuring Blueface and Lil Tjay)	2019	90	33	27	—	54	—	— (Note: "Slide" did not enter the NZ Top 40 Singles Chart, but peaked at number 13 on the NZ Hot Singles Chart.)	—	—	81	RIAA: Gold; MC: Gold	Montana
"Wiggle It" (featuring City Girls)	2019	—	—	28	—	—	—	— (Note: "Wiggle It" did not enter the NZ Top 40 Singles Chart, but peaked at number 39 on the NZ Hot Singles Chart.)	—	—	—	RIAA: Gold	Control the Streets, Volume 2 and Montana
"Suicide Doors" (featuring Gunna)	2019	—	—	—	—	—	—	—	—	—	—		Montana
"Writing on the Wall" (featuring Post Malone, Cardi B, and Rvssian)	2019	56	33	40	43	18	—	— (Note: "Writing on the Wall" did not enter the NZ Top 40 Singles Chart, but peaked at number four on the NZ Hot Singles Chart.)	40	54	44	RIAA: Gold; MC: Gold	Montana
"Twisted" (featuring Juicy J, Logic, and ASAP Rocky)	2019	—	—	—	—	—	—	— (Note: "Twisted" did not enter the NZ Top 40 Singles Chart, but peaked at number 24 on the NZ Hot Singles Chart.)	—	—	—		Montana
"Out of Your Mind" (with Swae Lee featuring Chris Brown)	2020	—	—	—	—	—	—	— (Note: "Out of Your Mind" did not enter the NZ Top 40 Singles Chart, but peaked at number 20 on the NZ Hot Singles Chart.)	—	—	—		Montana
"That's a Fact"	2020	—	—	—	—	—	—	—	—	—	—		Non-album single
"Cold" (featuring Tory Lanez)	2020	—	—	40	—	—	—	—	—	—	—	RMNZ: Gold	They Got Amnesia
"Double G" (featuring Pop Smoke)	2020	—	—	—	—	—	—	—	—	—	—		CB5
"Wave Blues" (featuring Benny the Butcher)	2020	—	—	—	—	—	—	—	—	—	—		CB5
"Hot Boy Bling" (featuring Jack Harlow and Lil Durk)	2021	—	—	40	—	—	—	—	—	—	—		CB5
"FWMGAB"	2021	—	—	19	—	—	—	—	—	—	—		They Got Amnesia
"I Don't Really Care"	2021	—	—	—	—	—	—	—	—	—	—		They Got Amnesia
"Panicking" (with Fivio Foreign)	2021	—	—	—	—	—	—	—	—	—	—		They Got Amnesia
"Handstand" (with Doja Cat featuring Saweetie)	2021	—	—	29	—	—	—	— (Note: "Handstand" did not enter the NZ Top 40 Singles Chart, but peaked at number 40 on the NZ Hot Singles Chart.)	—	—	—		They Got Amnesia
"Mopstick" (with Kodak Black)	2022	—	—	—	—	—	—	—	—	—	—	RIAA: Gold	They Got Amnesia
"Fenty" (with Nav)	2022	—	—	—	—	—	—	—	—	—	—		Coke Boys 6
"Chit Chat" (with Smooky MarGielaa and ASAP Rocky featuring DJ Drama)	2023	—	—	—	—	—	—	— (Note: "Chit Chat" did not enter the NZ Top 40 Singles Chart, but peaked at number 40 on the NZ Hot Singles Chart.)	—	—	—		Coke Boys 6: Money Heist Edition
"Ratataaa" (with 2Rare)	2023	—	—	—	—	—	—	—	—	—	—		Non-album singles
"Wish U Well" (with Swae Lee featuring Lojay and Jess Glynne)	2023	—	—	—	—	—	—	—	—	—	—		Non-album singles
"Another One of Me" (with Diddy and the Weeknd featuring 21 Savage)	2023	87	34	34	—	83	—	— (Note: "Another One of Me" did not enter the NZ Top 40 Singles Chart, but peaked at number 11 on the NZ Hot Singles Chart.)	—	—	98		The Love Album: Off the Grid
"Okay" (with Lil Baby and ATL Jacob)	2023	—	—	—	—	—	—	— (Note: "Okay" did not enter the NZ Top 40 Singles Chart, but peaked at number 22 on the NZ Hot Singles Chart.)	—	—	—		Mac & Cheese 5
"To the Moon" (with Fivio Foreign and Fabolous)	2024	—	—	—	—	—	—	—	—	—	—		Non-album single
"Outta Here" (with Trippie Redd)	2025	—	—	—	—	—	—	—	—	—	—		Coke Smack Vol 1
"Big Bag" (with Lil Durk)	2025	—	—	—	—	—	—	—	—	—	—		Coke Smack Vol 1
"Pack U Up" (with Cash Cobain)	2025	—	—	—	—	—	—	—	—	—	—		Coke Smack Vol 1
"Ever Since U Left Me (I Went Deaf)" (with Max B)	2026	82	19	—	—	96	—	—	—	—	—		Coke Wave 3.5: Narcos
"Minks in Miami" (with Rick Ross and Max B)	2026	— (Note: "Minks in Miami" did not enter the Billboard Hot 100, but peaked at number 17 on the Bubbling Under Hot 100 Singles chart.)	41	—	—	—	—	—	—	—	—		Set in Stone
"Tun Up" (with Stefflon Don)	2026	—	—	—	—	—	—	—	—	—	—		Non-album single
"—" denotes a recording that did not chart or was not released in that territory.

=== As featured artist ===
List of singles as featured artist, with selected chart positions, showing year released and album name
Title	Year	Peak chart positions						Certifications	Album
Title	Year	US	US R&B/HH	US Rap	CAN	SWE	SWI	Certifications	Album
"Husband or Wife" (Nawlage featuring French Montana)	2012	—	—	—	—	—	—		Non-album singles
"Untouchable" (DJ Absolut featuring Ace Hood, Pusha T, and French Montana)	2012	—	—	—	—	—			Non-album singles
"Stay Schemin'" (Rick Ross featuring Drake and French Montana)	2012	58	40	20	—	—	—	RIAA: Platinum; BPI: Gold	Rich Forever
"Hurt Somebody" (Akon featuring French Montana)	2012	—	— (Note: "Hurt Somebody" did not enter the Billboard R&B/Hip-Hop Songs chart, but peaked at number 6 on the Bubbling Under R&B/Hip-Hop Songs chart.)	—	94	—	—		The Koncrete Mixtape
"Yellow Tape" (Fat Joe featuring Lil Wayne, ASAP Rocky, and French Montana)	2012	—	57	—	—	—	—		Non-album single
"Tadow" (N.O.R.E. featuring French Montana, 2 Chainz, and Pusha T)	2013	—	—	—	—	—	—		Student of the Game
"Work (Remix)" (ASAP Ferg featuring French Montana, Trinidad James, Schoolboy Q, and ASAP Rocky)	2013	—	—	—	—	—	—	RIAA: 3x Platinum	Trap Lord
"About That Life" (DJ Kay Slay featuring Fabolous, T-Pain, Rick Ross, Nelly, and French Montana)	2013	—	54	—	—	—	—		Non-album single
"NBA" (Joe Budden featuring French Montana and Wiz Khalifa)	2013	—	56	—	—	—	—		No Love Lost
"Shisha" (Massari featuring French Montana)	2013	—	—	—	37	—	—	MC: Gold	Hero
"I Swear" (Ice Prince featuring French Montana and Shaydee)	2013	—	—	—	—	—	—		Fire of Zamani
"Self Made" (Daddy Yankee featuring French Montana)	2013	—	—	—	—	—	—		Non-album single
"Feelin' Myself" (Will.i.am featuring Miley Cyrus, French Montana, Wiz Khalifa, and DJ Mustard)	2013	96	29	18	—	—	—	BPI: Platinum; IFPI DEN: Gold; RMNZ: Platinum	#willpower
"I Luh Ya Papi" (Jennifer Lopez featuring French Montana)	2014	77	—	—	78	—	—		A.K.A.
"Big Homie" (Puff Daddy featuring Rick Ross and French Montana)	2014	—	—	—	—	—	—		MMM
"They Don't Love You No More" (DJ Khaled featuring Jay Z, Rick Ross, Meek Mill, and French Montana)	2014	— (Note: "They Don't Love You No More" did not enter the Billboard Hot 100, but peaked at number 5 on the Bubbling Under Hot 100 Singles chart.)	30	17	—	—	—		I Changed a Lot
"Early in the Morning" (Ashanti featuring French Montana)	2014	—	—	—	—	—	—		BraveHeart
"Ball Drop" (Fabolous featuring French Montana)	2014	—	—	—	—	—	—		The Young OG Project
"A.W.A" (Lacrim featuring French Montana)	2014	—	—	—	—	—	—	SNEP: Diamond	Corleone
"Can't Trust Thots" (Wash featuring French Montana)	2014	—	—	—	—	—	—	RMNZ: Gold	Non-album singles
"I'm Up" (Omarion featuring Kid Ink and French Montana)	2015	— (Note: "I'm Up" did not enter the Billboard Hot 100, but peaked at number 9 on the Bubbling Under Hot 100 Singles chart.)	41	—	—	—	—	RMNZ: Gold	Non-album singles
"Why You Mad? (Infinity Remix)" (Mariah Carey featuring French Montana, Justin Bieber, and T.I.)	2015	—	—	—	—	—	—		Non-album singles
"All the Way Up" (Fat Joe and Remy Ma featuring French Montana and Infared)	2016	27	9	5	46	—	—	RIAA: 3× Platinum; BPI: Gold; SNEP: Platinum; RMNZ: Platinum	Plata o Plomo
"You" (Keyshia Cole featuring Remy Ma and French Montana)	2017	—	— (Note: "You" did not enter the Billboard Hot R&B/Hip-Hop Songs, but peaked at number eight on the Bubbling Under R&B/Hip-Hop Singles chart.)	—	—	—	—		11:11 Reset
"Leg Over (Remix)" (Major Lazer and Mr Eazi featuring French Montana and Ty Dolla Sign)	2017	—	—	—	—	—	—		Non-album singles
"No I Love Yous" (Era Istrefi featuring French Montana)	2017	—	—	—	—	—	—		Non-album singles
"Dirty Sexy Money" (David Guetta and Afrojack featuring Charli XCX and French Montana)	2017	—	—	—	90	82	—	SNEP: Gold; RMNZ: Platinum	Non-album singles
"Tip Toe" (Jason Derulo featuring French Montana)	2017	—	—	—	50	66	—	BPI: Platinum; MC: 2x Platinum; RMNZ: Platinum	Nu King
"Row the Body" (Taio Cruz featuring French Montana)	2017	—	—	—	—	—	—		Non-album singles
"GPS" (Maluma featuring French Montana)	2017	—	—	—	—	—	—	RIAA: 4x Platinum	Non-album singles
"No More" (PrettyMuch featuring French Montana)	2017	—	—	—	—	—	—		Non-album singles
"Corazón" (Maître Gims featuring Lil Wayne and French Montana)	2018	—	—	—	—	—	—	SNEP: Gold	Ceinture noire
"Me So Bad" (Tinashe featuring French Montana and Ty Dolla Sign)	2018	—	22	— (Note: "Me So Bad" did not enter the Billboard Hot R&B/Hip-Hop Songs chart, but peaked at number 19 on the Ditigal R&b/Hip-Hop Song Sales chart.)	—	—	—		Joyride
"Zooted" (Becky G featuring French Montana and Farruko)	2018	—	—	—	—	— (Note: "Zooted" did not enter the Swedish Singellista Chart, but peaked at number 2 on the Swedish Heatseeker Chart.)	—		Non-album singles
"Magnum Cum Laude" (Mike Rebel featuring French Montana)	2018	—	—	—	—	—	—		Non-album singles
"Want It to Be" (Harry Fraud featuring French Montana and Chinx)	2018	—	—	—	—	—	—		Non-album singles
"Creep on Me" (Gashi featuring French Montana and DJ Snake)	2018	—	—	—	—	—	4	MC: Gold; IFPI SWI: Gold	Gashi
"Just Got Paid" (Sigala, Ella Eyre, and Meghan Trainor featuring French Montana)	2018	—	—	—	—	—	—	BPI: Platinum; MC: Platinum; RMNZ: Platinum	Brighter Days
"Ya Nour El Ein" (Massari featuring Maya Diab and French Montana)	2018	—	—	—	—	—	—		Non-album singles
"Maghreb Gang" (Farid Bang featuring French Montana and Khaled)	2019	—	—	—	—	—	5		Non-album singles
"Medicine" (Jennifer Lopez featuring French Montana)	2019	—	—	—	91	—	—		Non-album singles
"Who Do U Love?" (Monsta X featuring French Montana)	2019	—	—	—	—	—	—		All About Luv
"Diamonds" (Agnez Mo featuring French Montana)	2019	—	—	—	—	—	—		Non-album single
"Pack Loud" (Hitmaka featuring Wiz Khalifa, French Montana, and Travis Scott)	2019	—	—	—	—	—	—		Big Tuh
"Freka" (Mr Swipey with French Montana)	2020	—	—	—	—	—	—		Non-album single
"Whoopty NYC" (CJ featuring French Montana and Rowdy Rebel)	2021	—	—	—	—	—	—		Non-album single
"Dios Mio (Remix)" (Bizzy Crook featuring French Montana)	2021	—	—	—	—	—	—		Non-album single
"You Are My High" (Dzharo and Khanza with Nicky Jam and French Montana)	2021	—	—	—	—	—	—		Non-album single
"Dope" (Stove God Cooks with French Montana)	2021	—	—	—	—	—	—		Non-album single
"Maquine De Dinero" (El Alfa with French Montana and Braulio Fogon)	2022	—	—	—	—	—	—		Non-album single
"Ice Cream Dream" (DreamDoll featuring French Montana)	2022	—	—	—	—	—	—		Life in Plastic 3
"The Carnival" (Aazar with French Montana and Mariah Angeliq)	2022	—	—	—	—	—	—		Non-album singles
"Whap Whap" (Skillibeng featuring Fivio Foreign and French Montana)	2022	—	—	—	—	—	—		Non-album singles
"Same Girl (Halftime Remix)" (Jennifer Lopez featuring French Montana)	2022	—	—	—	—	—	—		Jennifer Lopez: Halftime
"Je M'appelle (Remix)" (Benzz featuring French Montana and Tion Wayne)	2022	—	—	—	—	—	—		Non-album singles
"Got a Feeling" (DThang featuring French Montana and TDOT)	2022	—	—	—	—	—	—		Non-album singles
"Like Dat (Remix)" (Stunna Girl featuring French Montana)	2023	—	—	—	—	—	—		Non-album singles
"Pit Stop" (Lola Brooke featuring French Montana)	2023	—	—	—	—	—	—		Dennis Daughter
"Cha Cha" (DThang featuring French Montana and Sha GZ)	2024	—	—	—	—	—	—		Non-album singles
"—" denotes a recording that did not chart or was not released in that territory.

=== Promotional singles ===
List of promotional singles, with selected chart positions, showing year released and album name
Title	Year	Peak chart positions	Album
Title	Year	US R&B/HH	Album
"Flexin' Hard (Remix)" (Chinx Drugz featuring French Montana and Jadakiss)	2011	—	Non-album singles
"Set in Stone (Remix)" (Yobi featuring Styles P, Jadakiss, and French Montana)	2011	—	Non-album singles
"Let It Go (Dope Boy) (Remix)" (Red Café featuring Diddy, French Montana, and 2 Chainz)	2012	—	Hell's Kitchen
"Snitches Ain't... (Remix)" (YG featuring Tyga, Snoop Dogg, 2 Chainz, and French Montana)	2012	—	Non-album singles
"No Country for Old Men" (Fat Joe featuring 2 Chainz and French Montana)	2012	—	Non-album singles
"Everything's a Go"	2012	96	Mister 16: Casino Life
"Wild Boy (Remix)" (MGK featuring 2 Chainz, French Montana, Meek Mill, Mystikal, Steve-O, and Yo Gotti)	2012	—	Non-album singles
"Function (Remix)" (E-40 featuring Problem, Young Jeezy, Chris Brown, French Montana, and Red Café)	2012	—	Non-album singles
"Snapbacks & Tattoos (Remix)" (Driicky Graham featuring Roscoe Dash, French Montana, and Cash Out)	2012	23	Non-album singles
"Bandz a Make Her Dance (Remix)" (Juicy J featuring French Montana, Lola Monroe, Wiz Khalifa, and B.o.B)	2012	—	Non-album singles
"Marble Floors" (featuring Rick Ross, Lil Wayne, and 2 Chainz)	2012	51	Excuse My French
"Hey My Guy" (featuring Max B)	2013	—	Excuse My French
"R&B Chicks" (featuring Fabolous and Wale)	2014	—	Non-album single
"Ay Vamos (Remix)" (J Balvin featuring Nicky Jam and French Montana)	2015	—	Furious 7: Original Motion Picture Soundtrack
"Sanctuary Pt. 2"	2016	—	Wave Gods
"Juice"	2018	—	No Stylist
"Nervous"	2018	—	No Stylist
"Slide (Remix)" (featuring Wiz Khalifa, Blueface, and Lil Tjay)	2019	—	Non-album singles
"That's a Fact (Remix)" (featuring Fivio Foreign and Mr. Swipey)	2020	—	Non-album singles
"One More Chance"	2024	—	Non-album singles
"—" denotes a recording that did not chart or was not released in that territory.

== Other charted and certified songs ==
List of songs, with selected chart positions, showing year released, certifications and album name
Title	Year	Peak chart positions			Certifications	Album
Title	Year	US	US R&B	US Rap	Certifications	Album
"Walk on Green" (Kirko Bangz featuring French Montana)	2012	—	125	—		Procrastination Kills 4
"Mula" (Big Sean featuring French Montana)	2012	—	122	—		Detroit
"Ocho Cinco" (featuring Diddy, Red Cafe, MGK, and Los)	2013	—	52	—		Excuse My French
"Bossin' Up" (Kid Ink featuring ASAP Ferg and French Montana)	2013	—	—	—	RMNZ: Gold	Almost Home
"FU" (Miley Cyrus featuring French Montana)	2013	— (Note: "FU" did not enter the Billboard Hot 100, but peaked at number 1 on the Bubbling Under Hot 100 Singles chart.)	—	—	RIAA: Gold	Bangerz
"Nobody" (Rick Ross featuring French Montana)	2014	— (Note: "Nobody" did not enter the Billboard Hot 100, but peaked at number 18 on the Bubbling Under Hot 100 Singles chart.)	38	23		Mastermind
"Gangsta Way" (featuring Chris Brown)	2015	—	—	—	RMNZ: Gold	Coke Zoo
"Outro" (Meek Mill featuring Lil Snupe and French Montana)	2016	— (Note: "Outro" did not enter the Billboard Hot 100, but peaked at number four on the Bubbling Under Hot 100 Singles chart.)	49	—		DC4
"—" denotes a recording that did not chart or was not released in that territory.

== Guest Appearances ==
List of non-single guest appearances, with other performing artists, showing year released and album name
Title	Year	Other artist(s)	Album
"TTG (Trained to Go)"	2010	Waka Flocka Flame, YG Hootie, Joe Moses, Suge Gotti, Baby Bomb	Flockaveli
"That Work"	2010	DJ Suss One, Uncle Murda, Cassidy, Joell Ortiz, Vado	The Feature Presentation Album
"Big Bank"	2011	Meek Mill, Pill, Torch, Rick Ross	Self Made Vol. 1
"Had It All"	2011	Chinx Drugz	Cocaine Riot
"Posted Up"	2011	Chinx Drugz	Cocaine Riot
"Coke Boy Knot"	2011	Chinx Drugz	Cocaine Riot
"I Shot Ya"	2011	Cheeze	Cocaine Under Boss
"Money Money"	2011	Cheeze	Cocaine Under Boss
"Body Work"	2011	Pusha T, Juicy J, Meek Mill	Fear of God II: Let Us Pray
"My Mind Gone"	2011	Wooh Da Kid	Strap-a-Holics
"Everything That Glitters"	2011	DJ Drama, Pusha T	Third Power
"Welcome to the Darkside"	2011	Fat Joe	The Darkside Vol. 2
"Off the Boat"	2012	Rick Ross	Rich Forever
"Bad Bitch"	2012	Red Café, Waka Flocka Flame	Hell's Kitchen
"No One Greater"	2012	Ashanti, Meek Mill	BraveHeart
"Wake Up"	2012	Trae Tha Truth	King of the Streets Freestyles
"Lay Low"	2012	Prodigy	H.N.I.C. 3: The Mixtape
"I'm from the Trap"	2012	Prodigy	H.N.I.C. 3: The Mixtape
"Thank You" (Remix)	2012	Estelle, Busta Rhymes	—N/a
"Different Lane"	2012	Mike Classic	Where Amazing Happens
"Mean Muggin'"	2012	Game, 2 Chainz	California Republic
"Got Damn" (Remix)	2012	DJ Kay Slay, Torch, Busta Rhymes, Gunplay, 2 Chainz	—N/a
"Wow" (Remix)	2012	Bo Deal, Waka Flocka Flame, Twista, Trae Tha Truth	—N/a
"Let the Streets Tell It"	2012	Kenny Kingpin, Maino	Rubberband Ready Radio
"Dirty Money"	2012	L.E.P. Bogus Boys, Chinx Drugz	—N/a
"Top Chef"	2012	Akon, Gucci Mane	The Koncrete Mixtape
"Self Made"	2012	Akon, Juicy J, Project Pat	The Koncrete Mixtape
"Slight Work" (Remix)	2012	Wale, Diddy, Mase	—N/a
"Paper Tags"	2012	Jadakiss, Styles P, Wale	Consignment
"Back to the Money"	2012	Jadakiss, Slim Dunkin, Waka Flocka Flame	Consignment
"Racked Up Shawty"	2012	Meek Mill, Fabolous	Dreamchasers 2
"Counting Hundreds"	2012	CashFlow	The Enterprise
"All Birds"	2012	Rick Ross	Self Made Vol. 2
"I Be Puttin' On"	2012	Wale, Wiz Khalifa, Roscoe Dash	Self Made Vol. 2
"No Giving Up"	2012	Chinx Drugz	Cocaine Riot 2
"I'm a Coke Boy"	2012	Chinx Drugz	Cocaine Riot 2
"Pressure on My Head"	2012	Chinx Drugz	Cocaine Riot 2
"Buy This Game"	2012	Chinx Drugz, Wale	Cocaine Riot 2
"MoWet"	2012	Roscoe Dash	2.0
"I Did It for My Dawgz"	2012	DJ Khaled, Rick Ross, Meek Mill, Jadakiss	Kiss the Ring
"Zu Gangster"	2012	Fler, Silla	Hinter blauen Augen
"Gripping Over Here"	2012	Styles P, Pusha T	The Diamond Life Project
"Mula"	2012	Big Sean	Detroit
"I'm on Already"	2012	Nino Man	I'm on Already
"Lick Season"	2012	Haitian Fresh, Rick Ross, Maino	Money, Power, Respect
"Adorn" (DJ Tedsmooth Remix)	2012	Miguel, Diddy	—N/a
"Suicidal Thoughts" (Remix)	2012	DJ Khaled, Mavado, Ace Hood	—N/a
"Nothin' Like the Rest"	2012	Wiz Khalifa	Cabin Fever 2
"Love Me Hate Me"	2012	Ice Burgandy, Waka Flocka Flame	Rhythm & Burgandy
"Work"	2012	Yo Gotti	Cocaine Muzik 7: The World Is Yours
"Fuck Em"	2012	Lil Durk	Life Ain't No Joke
"Shout Out"	2012	Birdman, Gudda Gudda	—N/a
"Motherload"	2012	Cokeboy Flip	F.L.I.P. (Fuck Love I'm Paid)
"Cold Blooded"	2012	Cokeboy Flip	F.L.I.P. (Fuck Love I'm Paid)
"Mean"	2012	Harry Fraud, Action Bronson	High Tide
"Let Me Love You" (Remix)	2012	Ne-Yo	—N/a
"Hold Me Back" (Remix)	2012	Rick Ross, Gunplay, Yo Gotti, Lil Wayne	—N/a
"Bandz A Make Her Dance" (Remix)	2012	Juicy J, Lola Monroe, Wiz Khalifa, B.o.B	—N/a
"All I Know"	2012	2 Pistols, Joell Ortiz	—N/a
"Tryna Come Up" (Remix)	2012	Nino Brown, Ace Hood, Yo Gotti	New Jack City
"You Don't Want It"	2012	DJ Kay Slay, K.A.R., Fat Joe, Max B	Grown Man Hip-Hop
"Alright"	2012	Brianna Perry	Symphony No. 9
"Intro"	2012	Trina	Back 2 Business
"Bitch Bad"	2012	Trina, DJ Khaled	Back 2 Business
"Gucci Everything"	2012	Red Café, Chief Keef, Game, Fabolous	American Psycho
"Time Zone"	2012	Paypa	Henny on The Rocks 3: Kim Jong Ill
"Diamonds"	2012	Chief Keef	Finally Rich
"Whatever I Want"	2012	Cash Out	Keisha
"Back 2 Ballin'"	2012	Wale	Folarin
"Body Operator" (Remix)	2013	DJ Spinking, Jeremih	—N/a
"Fuck 'Em All"	2013	Ace Hood	Starvation 2
"This N That"	2013	Ace Hood	Starvation 2
"All I Know"	2013	2 Pistols, Talib Kweli	—N/a
"Fuck Ya Nite Up"	2013	Klass Murda	King Kong
"High All The Time"	2013	DJ Kay Slay, Chinx Drugz	Grown Man Hip Hop Part 2 (Sleepin' With The Enemy)
"Money Work"	2013	Uncle Murda	The First 48
"Balling Out"	2013	Uncle Murda	The First 48
"Fuck Ya Friend"	2013	Uncle Murda, Wale	The First 48
"Ray Charles"	2013	La Fouine	Drôle de parcours
"NBA"	2013	Joe Budden, Wiz Khalifa	No Love Lost
"Doesn't Matter"	2013	Pusha T	Wrath of Caine
"These Bitches"	2013	Currensy	New Jet City
"Anything But Broke"	2013	Waka Flocka Flame, Frenchie	DuFlocka Rant 2
"Down and Out"	2013	Mexico Rann	The Zoovie
"Don't Make Me Do It"	2013	Funkmaster Flex, Vado, DJ Khaled, Ace Hood, Meek Mill	Who You Mad At? Me Or Yourself?
"Shit We On"	2013	Funkmaster Flex, Chinx Drugz, Cheeze	Who You Mad At? Me Or Yourself?
"It's The Syndrome" (Remix)	2013	Funkmaster Flex, Young Pretty, Chinx Drugz	Who You Mad At? Me Or Yourself?
"Werk"	2013	Cap1, 2 Chainz	T.R.U. 2 It
"Done With Her"	2013	Gucci Mane	Trap Back 2
"Right There"	2013	Chinx Drugz, Juicy J	Cocaine Riot 3
"One Night"	2013	Chinx Drugz, DJ Khaled, Roscoe Dash	Cocaine Riot 3
"I'm a Coke Boy" (Remix)	2013	Chinx Drugz, Rick Ross, Diddy	Cocaine Riot 3
"M.I.A." (Remix)	2013	Omarion, Rick Ross, Rockie Fresh	—N/a
"Faces of Death"	2013	N.O.R.E., Swizz Beatz, Raekwon, Busta Rhymes	Student of the Game
"Can You Hear Me Now"	2013	Brandy	—N/a
"Addiction"	2013	Cassie	RockaByeBaby
"My Heart"	2013	Wiley, Emeli Sandé	The Ascent
"9 Times Out Of 10"	2013	Ludacris, Que	#IDGAF
"Bugatti" (Remix)	2013	Ace Hood, T.I., Meek Mill, Wiz Khalifa, 2 Chainz, Future, DJ Khaled, Birdman	Trials & Tribulations
"Blocka"	2013	Meek Mill, Young Dro, T.I.	G.D.O.D. (Get Dough Or Die)
"Karate Chop" (Remix)	2013	Future, Rick Ross, Birdman	—N/a
"Work" (Remix)	2013	ASAP Ferg, ASAP Rocky, Trinidad James, Schoolboy Q	Trap Lord
"Can U Dig It"	2013	Lloyd Banks	—N/a
"Kobe Or Ginobili" (Remix)	2013	Mack Maine, Rick Ross, Busta Rhymes, Ace Hood	—N/a
"Money Dance" (Remix)	2013	King Louie, Yo Gotti	—N/a
"Slow Down"	2013	Dorrough	Shut The City Down
"Get Paid"	2013	Blink Money, Papoose, Chinx Drugz	—N/a
"50 (Interlude)"	2013	Machine Gun Kelly	Black Flag
"Panties To The Side"	2013	Tyga, Bow Wow, Gudda Gudda	Rich Gang
"Versace"	2013	Kirko Bangz, YG, G-Haze	Progression III
"FOH"	2013	DJ Prostyle, Fabolous	—N/a
"Been On"	2013	Chanel West Coast	Now You Know
"Kopy"	2013	Vado, Pusha T, Chinx Drugz	Slime Flu 4
"Twerk It" (Remix)	2013	Busta Rhymes, Vybz Kartel, Ne-Yo, T.I., Jeremih	—N/a
"Rich Friday"	2013	DJ Clue, Future, Nicki Minaj, Juelz Santana	—N/a
"FDB" (Remix)	2013	Young Dro, DJ Drama, T.I., Trinidad James	—N/a
"L's Anthem" (Remix)	2013	Lil Durk	—N/a
"Kilo"	2013	Meek Mill, Louie V Gutta, Yo Gotti	Self Made Vol. 3
"Bout That Life"	2013	Meek Mill, K Kutta, Torch, Iceberg	Self Made Vol. 3
"FU"	2013	Miley Cyrus	Bangerz
"I B On Dat"	2013	Meek Mill, Nicki Minaj, Fabolous	Dreamchasers 3
"My Life"	2013	Meek Mill	Dreamchasers 3
"Right Now"	2013	Meek Mill, Mase, Cory Gunz	Dreamchasers 3
"10 Bricks"	2013	Currensy, Smoke DZA, Big K.R.I.T.	The Stage
"Dis Ain't What U Want" (Remix)	2013	Lil Durk, Rick Ross, Meek Mill	—N/a
"Feelings"	2013	Chinx Drugz	I'll Take It from Here
"Champagne"	2013	E-40, Rick Ross	The Block Brochure: Welcome to the Soil 6
"Wake Up In It"	2013	Mally Mall, Tyga, Sean Kingston, Pusha T	Well Done 4
"Henny" (Remix)	2013	Mack Wilds, Mobb Deep	—N/a
"Look Me In My Eyes"	2013	Vado, Rick Ross	Sinatra
"Paranoid" (Remix)	2014	Ty Dolla $ign, Trey Songz, DJ Mustard	Beach House EP
"Watch Me Do It"	2014	Maino, T.I.	K.O.B.
"Nobody"	2014	Rick Ross, Diddy	Mastermind
"What a Shame"	2014	Rick Ross	Mastermind
"I'm Rich"	2014	Red Café, Ace Hood, Jeremih	American Psycho II
"A-Rod"	2014	2 Chainz	—N/a
"Turn Down for What" (Remix)	2014	DJ Snake, Lil Jon, Juicy J, 2 Chainz	—N/a
"Keep Calm" (Remix)	2014	DJ Kay Slay, Rico Love, Chinx Drugz, Gooney, Sheek Louch, Styles P	The Last Hip Hop Disciple
"Yayo" (Remix)	2014	Snootie Wild, Fabolous, Jadakiss, YG	Chapter One
"Same Girl"	2014	Jennifer Lopez	A.K.A.
"Fly High"	2014	Lil Durk	Signed To The Streets 2
"Suicide"	2014	Lil' Kim	Hard Core 2k14
"Chimes" (RMX)	2014	Hudson Mohawke, Pusha T, Future, Travi$ Scott	—N/a
"She Knows" (Remix)	2015	Ne-Yo, Fabolous, Juicy J	—N/a
"Ain't Bout To Do"	2015	Diggy Simmons	Out Of This World
"Wall to Wall"	2015	Raekwon, Busta Rhymes	Fly International Luxurious Art
"Till I Die Part II"	2015	Machine Gun Kelly, Bone Thugs N Harmony, Yo Gotti, Ray Cash	General Admission
"Poppin'" (remix)	2015	Meek Mill, Chris Brown	—N/a
"Die Young"	2015	Chinx, Meet Sims, Zack	Welcome To JFK
"Why You Mad (Infinity Remix)"	2015	Mariah Carey, Justin Bieber, T.I.	—N/a
"Money I Made"	2015	K Camp, Genius	Only Way Is Up
"Go Hard or Go Home Part 2"	2015	Wiz Khalifa, Trey Songz, Ty Dolla Sign	—N/a
"Diamonds & Gold" (Remix)	2015	Kid Ink, Chris Brown, Verse Simmonds	—N/a
"I Lied"	2015	DJ Khaled, Meek Mill, Jadakiss, Beanie Sigel	I Changed a Lot
"Every Time We Come Around"	2015	DJ Khaled, Ace Hood, Jadakiss, Vado	I Changed a Lot
"All or Nothing"	2015	Puff Daddy, Wiz Khalifa	MMM
"Money Ain't A Problem"	2015	Puff Daddy	MMM
"Blow a Check"	2015	Puff Daddy, Zoey Dollaz	MMM
"Hell of A Night"	2015	Chris Brown, Fetty Wap	Before the Party
"Swallow Me Down"	2015	Chris Brown	Before the Party
"Blase (Remix)"	2015	Ty Dolla Sign, T.I., ASAP Ferg	—N/a
"White Iverson (Remix)"	2015	Post Malone, Rae Sremmurd	—N/a
"Déjame Explorar"	2015	Yandel	Dangerous
"2011 BET Cypha"	2016	Termanology, Wais P, Rico Staxx, Cross, Mike Epps	Cameo King III
"Don't Mind"	2016	A$AP Ferg, Fabolous	Always Strive and Prosper
"Pick These Hoes Apart"	2016	DJ Khaled, Jeezy, Kodak Black	Major Key
"Shabba"	2016	Wizkid, Chris Brown, Trey Songz	—N/a
"Going Crazy"	2016	Jeezy	Trap or Die 3
"Clockin"	2016	Berner	Packs
"Outro"	2016	Meek Mill, Lil Snupe	DC4
"Legendary"	2016	Chinx, Mavado	Legends Never Die
"Player 2 Hate"	2016	Mr. Capone-E, Mally Mall	No Regrets
"We Never Looking Back"	2016	Toby Love	Bachata Nation
"Oh Yeah"	2017	Yo Gotti	I Still Am
"He Like That" (Remix)	2017	Fifth Harmony	Fifth Harmony
"Did You See" (Remix)	2017	J Hus	—N/a
"Modena Moves"	2018	Curren$y, Harry Fraud	The Marina EP
"New Thang"	2018	Remy Ma	The Uncle Drew Motion Picture Soundtrack
"God Wanted Us To Be Lit"	2018	Red Cafe, Wiz Khalifa	Less Talk More Hustle
"Don't Sleep"	2018	Chromeo, Stefflon Don	Head Over Heels
"FYT"	2018	Jeremih, Ty Dolla $ign	MihTy
"Welcome to the Party"	2018	Diplo, Lil Pump, Zhavia Ward	Deadpool 2
"Dust"	2018	Belly	Immigrant
"Try It"	2018	Jay Critch, Fabolous	Hood Favorite
"Brotha Man"	2018	ASAP Rocky	Testing
"Hold Up"	2019	Giggs	Big Bad...
"Maghreb Gang"	2019	Farid Bang, Khaled	—N/a
"Owed to Me"	2020	Trav, Jim Jones	Nothing Happens Overnight
"Bam Bam"	2020	Major Lazer, Beam	Music Is the Weapon
"Been To War"	2021	Swizz Beatz, DMX	Godfather of Harlem
"Cat Piss"	2024	NoCap	Before I Disappear Again

== Music videos ==
=== As lead artist ===
List of music videos, with directors, showing year released
Title	Year	Director(s)
"Choppa Choppa Down" (featuring Waka Flocka Flame)	2011	Morocco Vaughn
"Choppa Choppa Down" (Remix) (featuring Rick Ross and Wiz Khalifa)	2011	Morocco Vaughn
"Shot Caller" (featuring Charlie Rock)	2011	Duane Marcus
"Shot Caller" (Remix) (featuring Rick Ross and Diddy)	2012	Colin Tilley
"Everything's a Go"	2012	Spiff TV
"Pop That" (featuring Drake, Rick Ross and Lil Wayne)	2012	Parris
"Husband or Wife" (featuring Nawlage)	2012	Eif Rivera
"Straight Off the Boat" (featuring Rick Ross)	2012	Eif Rivera
"Devil Want My Soul"	2012	Eif Rivera
"Tic Toc" (featuring Trina)	2013	Jon J
"Sanctuary"	2013	Eif Rivera
"Ocho Cinco" (featuring Diddy, MGK, Red Café and Los)	2013	Eif Rivera
"Diamonds" (featuring J. Cole and Rick Ross)	2013	Edgar Esteves
"Freaks" (featuring Nicki Minaj)	2013	Eif Rivera
"Thrilla In Manilla" (featuring Tyga)	2013	none
"Ain't Worried About Nothin"	2013	Eif Rivera
"I Told Em"	2013	Dre Films
"If I Die"	2013	Sergio Parra
"Trap House" (featuring Birdman and Rick Ross)	2013	Eif Rivera
"Gifted" (featuring the Weeknd)	2013	Eif Rivera
"Once in a While" (featuring Max B)	2013	Eif Rivera
"Paranoid" (featuring Johnny May Cash)	2013	Eif Rivera
"Bad Bitch" (featuring Jeremih)	2015	Eif Rivera
"Unforgettable" (featuring Swae Lee)	2017	French Montana & Spiff TV
"Writing on the Wall" (featuring Post Malone, Cardi B & Rvssian)	2019	French Montana & Myles Wittingham
"Hot Boy Bling" (featuring Jack Harlow & Lil Durk)	2021	Elf Rivera
"Handstand" (featuring Doja Cat & Saweetie)	2021	Edgar Esteves & Jon Primo
"Ratataaa" (featuring 2Rare)	2023	Kid Art
"Wish U Well" (with Swae Lee featuring Lojay & Jess Glynne)	2023	French Montana

=== As featured artist ===
List of music videos, with directors, showing year released
Title	Year	Director(s)
"That Work" (DJ Suss-One featuring Uncle Murda, Cassidy, Joell Ortiz, French Montana and Vado)	2010	Sharief Ziyadat
"Sun Tzu" (N.O.R.E. featuring French Montana and Al Joseph)	2011	Will-C, Tana
"Black Roses" (Red Café featuring French Montana)	2011	Mazi O
"Welcome To The Darkside" (Fat Joe featuring French Montana)	2011	Eif Rivera
"Big Bank" (Rick Ross with Pill, Meek Mill and Torch featuring French Montana)	2011	Spiff TV
"Champion" (DJ Suss-One featuring Floyd Mayweather, Jadakiss, Lloyd Banks, French Montana and Junior Reid)	2011	Dan The Man
"Stay Schemin'" (Rick Ross featuring French Montana and Drake)	2012	Spiff TV
"Let It Go (Dope Boy)" (Remix) (Red Café featuring Diddy, French Montana and 2 Chainz)	2012	Aristotle
"Flexin' Hard" (Chinx Drugz featuring French Montana and Jadakiss)	2012	Shatek
"Hurt Somebody" (Akon featuring French Montana)	2012	Gil Green
"Wild Boy" (Remix) (MGK featuring 2 Chainz, French Montana, Meek Mill, Mystikal, Steve-O and Yo Gotti)	2012	Fredo Tovar
"Untouchable" (DJ Absolut featuring Ace Hood, Pusha T and French Montana)	2012	Shatek
"Actin' Up" (Wale and Meek Mill featuring French Montana)	2012	Mr. Boomtown
"Function" (Remix) (E-40 featuring Problem, Young Jeezy, Chris Brown, French Montana and Red Café)	2012	Fredo Tovar
"Walk on Green" (Kirko Bangz featuring French Montana)	2012	Mr. Boomtown
"Wow" (Remix) (Bo Deal featuring Waka Flocka Flame, French Montana, Twista and Trae tha Truth)	2012	Alvin Elmore
"Yellow Tape" (Fat Joe featuring DJ Khaled, Lil Wayne, ASAP Rocky and French Montana)	2012	Eif Rivera
"All Birds" (Rick Ross featuring French Montana)	2012	Spiff TV
"Shout Out" (Birdman featuring Gudda Gudda and French Montana)	2012	Colin Tilley
"I Did It For My Dawgz" (DJ Khaled featuring Rick Ross, Meek Mill, French Montana, Jadakiss and Ace Hood)	2012	Spiff TV
"Mula" (Big Sean featuring French Montana)	2012	Mike Carson, Mike Waxx
"Who Booty" (Remix) (Jonn Hart featuring French Montana)	2012	Alex Nazari
"Money Work" (Uncle Murda featuring French Montana)	2012	G Visuals
"I'm a Coke Boy" (Chinx Drugz featuring French Montana)	2012	Eif Rivera
"Tadow" (P.A.P.I. featuring French Montana, 2 Chainz and Pusha T)	2013	Will Millions
"Gucci Everything" (Red Café featuring Chief Keef, French Montana and Fabolous)	2013	Joe Puma
"Let Me Love You" (Remix) (Ne-Yo featuring French Montana)	2013	Juwan Lee
"About That Life" (DJ Kay Slay featuring Fabolous, Rick Ross, Nelly, French Montana and T-Pain)	2013	Decatur Dan
"Motherload" (Flip featuring French Montana)	2013	J. Cruz
"Doesn't Matter" (Pusha T featuring French Montana)	2013	Samuel Rogers
"These Bitches" (Currensy featuring French Montana)	2013	CJ Wallis
"Work" (Yo Gotti featuring French Montana)	2013	Breezy TV
"NBA" (Joe Budden featuring French Montana and Wiz Khalifa)	2013	Eif Rivera
"Shisha" (Massari featuring French Montana)	2013	RT!
"I'm a Coke Boy" (Remix) (Chinx Drugz featuring French Montana, Rick Ross and Diddy)	2013	Spiff TV
"Versace" (Kirko Bangz featuring French Montana, YG and G-Haze)	2013	Mr. Boomtown
"L's Anthem" (Remix) (Lil Durk featuring French Montana)	2013	AZaeProduction
"I B On Dat" (Meek Mill featuring Nicki Minaj, Fabolous and French Montana)	2013	Will Ngo
"I Swear" (Ice Prince featuring French Montana and Shaydee)	2013	J R Saint
"Feelin' Myself" (will.i.am featuring Miley Cyrus, French Montana and Wiz Khalifa)	2013	Pasha Shapiro, Michael Jurkova
"Roll On" (Migos featuring French Montana)	2013	Gabriel Hart
"Wake Up In It" (Mally Mall featuring Tyga, French Montana, Sean Kingston and Pusha T)	2014	Mike Ho
"Feelings" (Chinx Drugz featuring French Montana)	2014	Matt Brevner, Aaron Mallin
"Look Me In My Eyes" (Vado featuring Rick Ross and French Montana)	2014	Jay Rodriguez, Rock Davis
"Nobody" (Rick Ross featuring French Montana)	2014	Dre Films
"I Luh Ya Papi" (Jennifer Lopez featuring French Montana)	2014	Jessy Terrero
"Early In The Morning" (Ashanti featuring French Montana)	2015	Eif Rivera
"Who Do U Love?" (Monsta X featuring French Montana)	2019	VISHOP (Vikings League)

== Production discography ==
List of producer and songwriting credits
Track(s)	Year	Credit	Artist(s)	Album
—N/a	2012	Executive producer	Trina	Back 2 Business
"All Day"	2014	Producer	Kanye West	—N/a
17. "Swing"	2018	Additional producer	Quavo	Quavo Huncho
01. "Montana" (produced with Prince 85 and Harry Fraud); 04. "What It Look Like" (produced with Cool & Dre and SAP); 06. "Salam Alykum" (produced with Harry Fraud and Mixx); 07. "That Way" (produced with Coulture); 08. "Say Goodbye" (produced with Harry Fraud, Scorp Dezel, and Mally Mall); S2; 07. "Wiggle It" (produced with Ben Billions); S2; 08. "Slide"	2019	Co-producer	French Montana	Montana
"Power"	2020	Songwriter	Kevin Gates	Non-album single
—N/a	2021	Executive producer	CJ	Loyalty Over Royalty
05. "I’m Lit"	2021	Producer	CJ	Loyalty Over Royalty
07. "Real One"	2021	Producer	CJ	Loyalty Over Royalty
