= Cigarette Boats =

EP by Curren$y & Harry Fraud
- Released: July 10, 2012
- Recorded: 2012
- Genre: Hip-hop
- Length: 14:25
- Label: Jet Life Recordings
- Producer: Harry Fraud

Curren$y chronology
The Stoned Immaculate (2012)	Cigarette Boats (2012)	Priest Andretti (2012)

Cigarette Boats is an EP by American rapper Curren$y and producer Harry Fraud. It was released for online download on July 10, 2012. XXL named it the "2012 EP of the Year".

== Track listing ==
- All songs produced by Harry Fraud

No.	Title	Length
1.	"Leaving the Dock"	3:03
2.	"WOH" (featuring Styles P)	3:01
3.	"Biscayne Bay"	2:08
4.	"Mirrors" (featuring Smoke DZA)	3:04
5.	"Sixty-Seven Turbo Jet"	3:19
