= Cocaine Mafia =

Mixtape by French Montana, Juicy J and Project Pat
- Released: December 19, 2011
- Recorded: 2010
- Genre: Hip hop
- Label: Coke Boys, Hypnotize Minds, Evil Empire

French Montana chronology
Lock Out (2011)	Cocaine Mafia (2011)	Coke Boys 3 (2011)

Juicy J chronology
Blue Dream & Lean (2011)	Cocaine Mafia (2011)	Blue Dream & Lean: Reloaded (2011)

Project Pat chronology
Loud Pack (2011)	Cocaine Mafia (2011)	Belly On Full (2012)

Cocaine Mafia is a collaborative mixtape by rappers French Montana, Juicy J and Project Pat. The mixtape was announced in mid 2010, and released on December 19, 2011. It features guest appearances from DJ Paul, Chinx Drugz, Gucci Mane and Akon.

== Background ==
On July 14, 2010, New York rapper French Montana informed XXL magazine that he had recently finished recording with Memphis-based veteran rappers Three 6 Mafia, and they would be releasing a collaborative record soon. According to French, rapper Juicy J was the one who reached out to him. "I felt honored. So after that me and Juicy J kicked it and we just ended up doing a whole album." On January 31, 2011, French revealed to MTV News that his recent hit single "Choppa Choppa Down" which featured Waka Flocka Flame, from the past year's Coke Boys mixtape, was originally intended to be a collaboration between him and Juicy J and Project Pat. Cocaine Mafia was released on December 19, and would be Juicy J's fourth mixtape that year and French Montana's third.

== Critical reception ==
Cocaine Mafia received mixed reviews from music critics. Sowmya Krishnamurthy of HipHopDX criticized the record for being underwhelming stating "this is a joint that needed a bit more rumination before release." However, Tom Breihan of Stereogum praised the mixtape, complimenting French's delivery stating his "sleepy-eyed monotone delivery sounds pretty amazing on chaotic Southern fight-music [...] like the calm in the middle of the storm", and noted a relaxed and darker Juicy J compared to his more party oriented releases of earlier that year.

== Track listing ==
No.	Title	Lyrics	Producer(s)	Length
1.	"Intro"	Juicy J		2:29
2.	"Catch Ya Later"	French Montana, Juicy J	Lex Luger	2:58
3.	"You Need Haters"	French, Juicy J, Project Pat		3:21
4.	"Do It"	French, Juicy J, Project Pat	Harry Fraud	3:38
5.	"All She Want Is Money"	French, Juicy J, Project Pat	Juicy J	3:31
6.	"Helicopter"	French, Juicy J, Project Pat		3:49
7.	"Alright"	French, Juicy J, Project Pat	Sanat	3:06
8.	"Is You Kiddin Me?" (featuring DJ Paul)	French, Juicy J, Project Pat	Lex Luger	4:21
9.	"Self Made" (featuring Akon)	French, Juicy J, Project Pat		4:33
10.	"Weed and Hennesy"	French, Juicy J, Project Pat		3:42
11.	"I'm Guttah Bra"	French, Juicy J, Project Pat	Juicy J	4:12
12.	"If It Comes Down To It"	French, Juicy J, Project Pat		3:48
13.	"Money, Weed, Blow"	French, Juicy J, Project Pat	Juicy J	4:50
14.	"Choppa Choppa Down"	French, Juicy J, Project Pat	Billionaire Boyscout	5:18
15.	"Drop That"	French, Juicy J		2:33
16.	"Full Of Everything" (featuring Chinx Drugz)	French, Juicy J	Harry Fraud	4:19
17.	"Morning Paper"	French, Juicy J, Project Pat	Juicy J	3:48
18.	"Straight Cash" (featuring Gucci Mane)	French, Juicy J	J.Cardim	4:25
