= Mac & Cheese 3 =

Album by French Montana

Mixtape by French Montana
- Released: November 19, 2012
- Recorded: 2012
- Genre: Hip hop
- Length: 70:03
- Label: Coke Boys; Bad Boy; MMG; Evil Empire; Big Mike
- Producer: Harry Fraud; Young Chop; Rico Love; Boi-1da; The Maven Boys; Deputy; The Renegades; Shawdi P; Black Metaphor; Swizz Beatz; Dollarz; DJ Mustard

French Montana chronology
Coke Boys 3 (2012)	Mac & Cheese 3 (2012)	Excuse My French (2013)

Mac & Cheese 3 is the sixteenth mixtape by American rapper French Montana, and the third installation in his "Mac & Cheese" series of mixtapes. It was released on November 19, 2012. The mixtape features guest appearances from Diddy, Red Cafe, MGK, Los, Future, Chinx Drugz, Ma$e, Rico Love, Fat Joe, Wale, Mac Miller, Curren$y, J. Cole, Rick Ross, Trina, Prodigy, Fabolous, Tyga and Ace Hood.

== Background ==
In 2012, French Montana signed a deal with Diddy's Bad Boy Entertainment, and another deal with Rick Ross's Maybach Music Group. Montana announced his project, under the title Mac & Cheese 3, will be his first release on the label. The mixtape has a selection of songs, which were meant for his debut album, titled Excuse My French. However, he decided to release this project, consisting twenty tracks for free download. After a small delay, French Montana has released the third installment of the Mac & Cheese' mixtape series on November 18, 2012. He also released the mixtape in a clean version, in order to get radio airplay.

Montana listed the guest appearances of Bad Boy affiliates Diddy, Red Cafe, MGK, Los, and MMG affiliates Rick Ross, Wale, alongside the likes of Chinx Drugz, Ma$e, Rico Love, Fat Joe, Future, Mac Miller, Curren$y, J. Cole, Trina, Prodigy, Fabolous, Tyga and Ace Hood. Production was handled by Young Chop, Harry Fraud, Boi-1da, DJ Mustard and Black Metaphor, among others. The mixtape was downloaded over 437,000 times in under 2 weeks on the DatPiff server.

== Track listing ==
No.	Title	Producer(s)	Length
1.	"Only If for a Night (Intro)"	Harry Fraud	4:04
2.	"Ocho Cinco" (featuring Diddy, Red Cafe, Machine Gun Kelly and King Los)	Young Chop; Rob Holladay (co.)	4:06
3.	"Baby Momma (Skit)"		0:32
4.	"Yayo" (featuring Future and Chinx)	Young Chop	3:12
5.	"Water"	Bandplay	4:06
6.	"Grown Ups" (featuring Mase and Rico Love)	Rico Love; Rych Bankz	4:17
7.	"Hatin' on a Youngin'"	Young Chop	3:06
8.	"Devil Want My Soul"	Young Chop	4:55
9.	"State of Mind"	Harry Fraud	3:09
10.	"Don't Go Over There" (featuring Fat Joe and Wale)	Boi-1da; The Maven Boys	3:45
11.	"Last of the Real" (featuring Mavado and Ace Hood)	Jim Jonsin; Vinylz (co.)	3:52
12.	"Weed (Skit)"		0:51
13.	"Triple Double" (featuring Mac Miller and Currensy)	Harry Fraud	3:47
14.	"Diamonds" (featuring J. Cole and Rick Ross)	Deputy; Swizz Beatz	4:10
15.	"Tic Toc" (featuring Trina)	The Renegades	4:25
16.	"Hip Hop" (featuring Fat Joe)	Shawdi P	3:04
17.	"Sanctuary (inspired from Kingdom Hearts)" (featuring U. Hikaru)	Black Metaphor	5:17
18.	"No Sunshine" (featuring Prodigy and Chinx)	Dollarz	3:59
19.	"Dance Move" (featuring Fabolous and Wale)	The Renegades	2:51
20.	"Mean" (featuring Action Bronson)	Harry Fraud	3:57
21.	"Thrilla in Manilla" (featuring Tyga)	DJ Mustard	2:38
Total length:			70:03

== Release history ==
Regions	Dates	Label(s)
Worldwide	November 19, 2012	Coke Boys, Bad Boy, MMG
