= Coke Boys (mixtape) =

Mixtape by French Montana
- Released: September 15, 2010
- Recorded: 2010
- Genre: Hip hop
- Label: Coke Boys, DJ Drama, DJ Lust, DJ Diggz
- Producer: Big Fruit; Billionaire Boyscout; Harry Fraud; Juicy J; Lex Luger; Sid Roams

French Montana chronology
Mac & Cheese 2 (2010)	Coke Boys (2010)	Mister 16: Casino Life (2011)

Coke Boys is the tenth mixtape by American rapper French Montana, and the first installation in his "Coke Boys" series of mixtapes. It was released on September 15, 2010. The mixtape features collaborations with rappers Three 6 Mafia, Waka Flocka Flame, Akon, Gucci Mane, Fat Joe, Wiz Khalifa and French's fellow Coke Boys Chinx, Coke Boy Cheezy Dior, Droop Flip and Brock among others.

== Background ==
Following the release of the Coke Boys mixtape, French Montana embarked on his first national tour throughout the eastern United States. The "Coke Boys Tour" kicked off on October 15 in New Jersey and culminated with its final show on November 5 in Chicago. A separate compilation mixtape aptly titled Coke Boys Tour, often referred to as Coke Boys 1.5, was released on October 20 to coincide with the event. Throughout the tour, French was accompanied by his fellow Coke Boys, and various artists the likes of Wiz Khalifa, Waka Flocka Flame, Gunplay, Klean Up Krew, Eminem, Gucci Mane, Akon, Three 6 mafia, and Fat Joe. Rappers Wiz Khalifa and Waka Flocka had previously collaborated with French on his ninth mixtape Mac & Cheese 2 earlier that year.

The track "Choppa Choppa Down", produced by Chicago-based Billionaire Boyscout and featuring Waka Flocka Flame, would go on to be French's breakout single becoming a regional hit among clubs and radio throughout the South. With the popularity of the record and French's growing buzz in the South, he was approached by Florida-based rapper Rick Ross who jumped on a remix to the popular single and which also featured Wiz Khalifa.

== Critical reception ==
Coke Boys received positive reviews from music critics. David Drake of Complex magazine complimented the project stating "The first Coke Boys release was a major milestone for French, and arguably the best record of the rapper's mixtape run." Drake praised the rapper's recent Southern direction, and his collaboration with Waka Flocka on "Choppa Down" attributing its success largely to French's hook. Drake also complimented his work with Harry Fraud noting "The second half of the tape is possibly its strongest."

== Track listing ==
No.	Title	Producer(s)	Length
1.	"Intro"		1:57
2.	"Storm Is Coming" (featuring CeeLo Green)		3:45
3.	"Choppa Choppa Down" (featuring Waka Flocka Flame)	Billionaire Boyscout	4:11
4.	"Dope Man"	Harry Fraud	1:39
5.	"Magic"	Carl Rosen	3:06
6.	"Lie To Me" (featuring Chinx & Flip)	Harry Fraud	3:47
7.	"Skit"		1:50
8.	"Pimpin Ain't Easy"		3:02
9.	"Have It All" (featuring Masspike Miles)	Sid Roams	3:19
10.	"Is U Kiddin Me?" (featuring Three 6 Mafia & Project Pat)	Lex Luger	4:15
11.	"Top Chef" (featuring Akon & Gucci Mane)	Big Fruit	5:41
12.	"Crack da Top" (featuring Cheeze)	Harry Fraud	3:36
13.	"How It Feel" (featuring Sam Hook & Chinx)		3:35
14.	"Belong to Me" (featuring Cheeze)	Harry Fraud	3:04
15.	"We Run NY" (featuring Fat Joe)	Harry Fraud	3:54
16.	"Goin' In For The Kill" (featuring Chinx Drugz & Cheeze)	Harry Fraud	3:50
17.	"Hammer Long" (featuring Chinx Drugz, Cheeze & Brock)	Harry Fraud	4:32
18.	"Not Ready" (featuring Wiz Khalifa)		3:19
19.	"Money, Weed, Blow" (featuring Juicy J & Project Pat)	Juicy J	4:40
