= The Appetizer =

Mixtape by French Montana
- Released: December 19, 2014
- Recorded: 2014
- Genre: Hip-hop
- Labels: Coke Boys; Bad Boy; MMG
- Producers: Harry Fraud; The MeKanics; Adrain Lau

French Montana chronology
Coke Boys 4 (2014)	The Appetizer (2014)	Casino Life 2 (2015)

Mac & Cheese: The Appetizer (or simply The Appetizer) is an EP mixtape by American rapper French Montana and produced by Harry Fraud. French Montana's eighteenth mixtape, it was released on December 19, 2014, and is a prequel to Mac & Cheese 4.

== Background ==
Following the release of his debut album Excuse My French earlier in the year, on November 9, French Montana revealed an early cover art teasing the release of Mac & Cheese 4 but had not specified whether it would be an album or a mixtape. In an interview with Rolling Stone magazine on January 8, 2014, French confirmed that the record would be his sophomore album to be released later in the year. However, with the album facing delays, on December 8, French Montana announced the release of an EP collaboration with long-time producer Harry Fraud, entitled Mac & Cheese: The Appetizer, to be released on December 16. After another round of delays, the mixtape was finally released on December 19 and featured seven tracks.

== Critical reception ==
The Appetizer received mixed reviews from music critics. Nick Demarco of The E-Fix complimented the production stating, "the mixtape sounds great on a technical level", but criticized the tape for being underwhelming: "there really isn’t much to it besides the nice sounds and the parts where French reflects on his childhood and his time with Max B." Max Weinstein of Watchloud.com praised the chemistry between French and producer Harry Fraud, noting, "his beats complement French’s meandering vocal style, like a bed of drugs for an addict."

== Track listing ==
No.	Title	Producer(s)	Length
1.	"Haaan (Max B Speaks)"	Harry Fraud	2:14
2.	"Poison"	Harry Fraud, Adrian Lau & The MeKanics	4:26
3.	"How You Want It"	Harry Fraud	4:39
4.	"Dontchu"	Harry Fraud	3:27
5.	"Sweetest Thing"	Harry Fraud	4:15
6.	"Let You Know"	Harry Fraud	3:02
7.	"Playing In The Wind II"	Harry Fraud	3:13
