= Dream. Zone. Achieve =

Studio album by Smoke DZA
- Released: April 1, 2014
- Recorded: 2013–14
- Genre: Hip hop
- Label: R.F.C. Music Group
- Producers: 183rd; 6th Sense; Buda Da Future; Cardo; DJ Dahi; Grandz Muzik; Harry Fraud; Jahlil Beats; Kirk Knight; King Thelonious; Lee Bannon; Pete Rock; Sean C & LV; Ski Beatz; V-Don

Smoke DZA chronology
Rugby Thompson (2012)	Dream. Zone. Achieve (2014)	He Has Risen (2016)

Singles from Dream. Zone. Achieve
- 1. "Legends In the Making (Ashtray, Pt. 2)" Released: November 5, 2013

Dream. Zone. Achieve (stylized as Dream.ZONE.Achieve) is the third studio album by American rapper Smoke DZA. It was released on April 1, 2014, by DZA's R.F.C. Music Group record label. The album features guest appearances from Cam'ron, NymLo, Joey Badass, Ab-Soul, Kobe, CJ Fly, Wiz Khalifa, Currensy, Ty Dolla Sign, Bluntsmoker, J. Ivy and BJ the Chicago Kid.

== Background ==
In April 2014, in an interview with Complex, Smoke DZA spoke about the lack of marijuana references on the album, saying: "The decision from that came from not really trying to spring away from it, ‘cause I’m not trying to lose my supporters and I’m really indebted into the culture because regardless if I was rapping or not I’d be smoking weed. I felt like I had to let people get into my life and see my journey from where I started to where I’m at right now. And I felt like in past projects it was a gap within that, like I’d give a little bit. But this project was like full-circle with everything, it’s more like a life composition."

During the same interview, he also spoke about the album's three-part format, saying: "I mean the name of the project is Dream.ZONE.Achieve. So I’m trying to give that feeling every time. The first act is Dream, that’s the process, the thought, everything going into doing what you want to do. So I'm basing that feeling on shit like 'Ghost Of Dipset,' 'City Of Dreams.' Then it goes into ZONE, the hustle, the motivation and that shit like 'Hearses.' That shit like 'Zone,' the joint I put out with CJ Fly. And then Achieve, you know, that’s the basking in the glory and everything else, reaping the benefits of what you do. That goes 'Tropicana Roses,' 'Errthang Valid,' 'Achieve,' the joint that Pete Rock did, so I tried to split up moods."

He also spoke about how the album cover was inspired by Nas in the film Belly, saying: "Well, I’ve always like that picture. I felt like that picture describes my title: dreaming, zoning, and achieving, like, I’m doing all three in that picture. That image with Nas sitting there, back in the day just was so much for me. I just felt like flipping that into a cover would be the right thing to. Plus it was painted. Shout out to BK."

== Singles ==
On November 5, 2013, the album's first single "Legends In the Making (Ashtray, Pt. 2)" featuring Currensy and Wiz Khalifa was released. On January 27, 2014, the music video for "Legends In the Making (Ashtray, Pt. 2)" featuring Currensy and Wiz Khalifa, was released. On March 5, 2014, the music video was released for "City of Dreams". On July 9, 2014, the music video was released for "Hearses" featuring Ab-Soul.

== Critical reception ==
Professional ratings
Aggregate scores
Source	Rating
Metacritic	63/100
Review scores
Source	Rating
Pitchfork Media	6.2/10
PopMatters	5/10
XXL	(XL)

Dream.ZONE.Achieve was met with generally positive reviews. At Metacritic, which assigns a normalized rating out of 100 to reviews from critics, the album received an average score of 63, based on 4 reviews, indicating "generally favorable reviews". Nate Patrin of Pitchfork Media gave the album a 6.2 out of 10, saying "Without a sustained attention-getting creativity, the themes of Dream.ZONE.Achieve largely blur together in a haze of aimless defiance and frustration. You've heard tracks like "City of Dreams" (NYC-repping anti-swag call to realness), "9eleven" (neighborhood as war zone), and "Jigga Flow" (pick any Reasonable Doubt deep cut) before—and DZA hasn't come around to finding a way to make these popular, often relatable, and frankly well-worn themes uniquely his own. Considering how often the spotlight swings to personality-rich guests like Ab-Soul ("Hearses"), Wiz Khalifa & Curren$y ("Legends in the Making"), and BJ the Chicago Kid ("Robin Givens"), the contrast gets pretty stark." Adam Finley of PopMatters gave the album a five out of ten, saying "It’s paint-by-numbers Harlem rap from the Jim Jones era, and frankly, in 2014 there’s just too much going on in hip hop for this to carry much sway, leaving Dream.Zone.Achieve a too-long-by-half 80-minute course in hard-nosed Harlem rap with plenty of good beats but without a distinct voice to guide it."

Nick de Molina of XXL gave the album an XL rating, saying "Criticisms of the portioning aside, D.Z.A should provide Harlem rap loyalists with a highly listenable distraction to hold them over until that new Dipset album drops. Smoke’s style is nostalgic without sounding corny, confident and hungry without losing its sense of humor. This album reads more like an [sic] rare, extensive box set than the three-act concept album (named for the “DZA” in “Smoke DZA”) is presumably trying to be. He could have benefited from having the album broken up into seven-track EPs and released over the course of two-three months, but we’re forced to aimlessly sift our own way through D.Z.A. Lucky for us, there’s enough gold in there to go around."

== Track listing ==
Act I: Dream
No.	Title	Producer(s)	Length
1.	"Dream"	V-Don	1:40
2.	"Count Me In"	Lee Bannon	3:25
3.	"Ghost of Dipset" (featuring Cam'ron)	King Thelonious	4:11
4.	"City of Dreams"	Buda Da Future; Grandz Muzik	3:29
5.	"Jigga Flow" (featuring NymLo)	Ski Beatz	5:07
6.	"Fhvt BVsturd" (featuring Joey Badass)	Kirk Knight	3:59
7.	"9eleven"	183rd	3:08

Act II: Zone
No.	Title	Producer(s)	Length
8.	"Pull Your Skirt Down (Interlude)"		0:43
9.	"Hearses" (featuring Ab-Soul)	DJ Dahi	4:53
10.	"I Don't Know" (featuring Kobe)	Harry Fraud	3:50
11.	"Zone" (featuring CJ Fly)	6th Sense	3:11
12.	"Legends In The Making (Ashtray Pt. 2)" (featuring Wiz Khalifa and Currensy)	Harry Fraud	4:20
13.	"Pass Off" (featuring Ty Dolla Sign and Bluntsmoker)	Cardo	3:24
14.	"Robin Givens" (featuring BJ the Chicago Kid)	V-Don	3:44

Act III: Achieve
No.	Title	Producer(s)	Length
15.	"It Ain’t About The Money (Interlude)"		0:42
16.	"Errthang Valid"	Jahlil Beats	2:25
17.	"Tropicana Roses"	DJ Dahi	3:07
18.	"Maybe"	Sean C & LV	4:05
19.	"Puzzle of Life"	V-Don	3:50
20.	"Black Independence" (featuring J. Ivy)	183rd	7:10
21.	"Achieve"	Pete Rock	8:58

== Chart positions ==
Chart (2014)	Peak position
US Independent Albums (Billboard)	50
US Top R&B/Hip-Hop Albums (Billboard)	30
US Top Rap Albums (Billboard)	18
