= Rugby Thompson =

Studio album by Smoke DZA
- Released: June 19, 2012
- Recorded: 2011–12
- Genre: Hip hop
- Length: 38:59
- Label: High Times; Cinematic
- Producer: Harry Fraud

Smoke DZA chronology
Rolling Stoned (2011)	Rugby Thompson (2012)	Dream. Zone. Achieve (2014)

Rugby Thompson is the second studio album by American rapper Smoke DZA. The album was released on June 19, 2012, by High Times Records and Cinematic Music Group. The album is entirely produced by Harry Fraud. The album features guest appearances from Currensy, Domo Genesis, Schoolboy Q, Sean Price, A$AP Twelvyy, Action Bronson, Thirstin Howl III, NymLo and Meyhem Lauren.

== Background ==
In July 2012, in an interview with HipHopDX, Smoke DZA spoke about the album, saying: "I think [Rugby Thompson is] a masterpiece. I think it’s the best project I’ve ever put out—lyrically, production-wise, creativity…really it’s just a great piece of work being a Hip Hop lover. Fuck it. You don’t have to smoke weed to enjoy this shit. For me, that’s been the stigma for a lot. People just immediately throw me in the Afroman realm like I’m just this weed guy. In reality, I’m from 119th street and I can really rap. I really do this shit." Producer Harry Fraud also spoke about how long it took to complete the album, saying: "We really only started working on it at New Year’s. And it came out in June. So there hasn’t really been that much time because we worked on it so quick. That’s important, because I kind of feel like we captured that moment for ourselves. And there’s nothing to really look back on and say, “Oh we could’ve done this different,” because it was really all organic and right in the moment. The beats and rhymes were written right there, so it was whatever was coming to us at the time."

== Critical reception ==
Professional ratings
Aggregate scores
Source	Rating
Metacritic	79/100
Review scores
Source	Rating
DJBooth	3.5/5 stars
HipHopDX	3.5/5 stars
RapReviews	6.5/10
XXL	(XL)

Rugby Thompson was met with generally positive reviews from music critics. At Metacritic, which assigns a normalized rating out of 100 to reviews from critics, the album received an average score of 79, which indicates "generally favorable reviews", based on 6 reviews. The Company Man of HipHopDX gave the album three and a half stars out of five, saying "Rugby Thompson is a great listen, largely. "Rivermonts" and "Game 7" feel like filler next to the rest, and "Lo Horsemen" is a bit cumbersome for such a clean collaboration. Those aside, Smoke DZA and Harry Fraud deliver a solid collection of songs that grow more interesting on repeated listen, basking in an evolved sound equally representing vintage and avant-garde New York Hip Hop. Welcome to the new era." Neil Martinez-Belkin of XXL gave the album an XL, saying "DZA and Fraud recorded almost the entirety of Rugby Thompson together at Fraud’s Brooklyn studio. The rapper/producer tandem has become somewhat of a lost art in an era where entire albums are created via email exchange between rappers and an internet full of hungry beatmakers. But the chemistry between these two is palpable. It reminds of when DZA’s Jet Life compadre, Curren$y, fully came out of his shell with his Pilot Talk series alongside Ski Beatz. The same might be said about DZA and Rugby Thompson, an album that not only strips him of an unfair “weed rapper” label, but is also probably the best rap album to come out of New York this year." Steve Juon of RapReviews gave the album a 6.5 out of 10, saying "The only impressions I get of Smoke DZA on Rugby Thompson are that he wants to smoke weed, fuck around, and make tracks with his friends - which when it comes to free mixtapes was perfectly fine. Now that he's charging for it though he should come with a little bit more, especially if he's promising a thematic cinematic album that ultimately doesn't turn out to be either."

Peter Marrack of Exclaim! gave the album a positive review, saying "And so, if you want to learn more about a Harlem kid who grew up selling weed and who now dons $1,500 boots he purchased from the Ralph Lauren Mansion in Atlanta, then Rugby Thompson comes highly recommended. It is a skilfully wrought glimpse into that dream." Max August of DJBooth gave the album three and a half stars out of five, saying "Nothing on the album is groundbreaking and it won’t go on to sell millions of copies, but that doesn’t mean that it isn’t a worthy piece of musical art. Smoke DZA deserves his place amongst real down-to-earth rappers, he has paid his dues and his hard work and reputation justifies a purchase. So lend an ear and slip into the smoky world of Rugby Thompson."

== Track listing ==
- All songs produced by Harry Fraud.

No.	Title	Length
1.	"Rugby Thompson"	2:58
2.	"New Jack"	2:58
3.	"Baleedat" (featuring Currensy)	2:59
4.	"Playground Legend"	2:59
5.	"Ashtray" (featuring Domo Genesis and Schoolboy Q)	4:29
6.	"Fuck Ya Mother" (featuring Sean Price)	2:26
7.	"Game 7" (featuring A$AP Twelvyy)	3:03
8.	"Kenny Powers"	2:57
9.	"Turnbuckle Music" (featuring Action Bronson)	4:03
10.	"Rivermonts"	2:59
11.	"Lo Horsemen" (featuring Thirstin Howl III, NymLo, and Meyhem Lauren)	4:15
12.	"Prelude to Judgement Day"	2:52
Total length:		38:59

== Charts ==
Chart (2012)	Peak position
US Top R&B/Hip-Hop Albums (Billboard)	45
US Heatseekers Albums (Billboard)	13
