= Rolling Stoned =

Studio album by Smoke DZA
- Released: August 30, 2011
- Recorded: 2010–11
- Genre: Hip hop
- Length: 40:35
- Label: iH2D; iHipHop
- Producer: 183rd; Beats by Ned; Big K.R.I.T.; Cardo; Omen; V-Don

Smoke DZA chronology
| Rolling Stoned (2011) | Rugby Thompson (2012) |

Rolling Stoned is the debut studio album by American rapper Smoke DZA. The album was released on August 30, 2011, by iH2D and iHipHop Distribution. The album features guest appearances from Bun B, Big K.R.I.T., Kendrick Lamar, ASAP Rocky, Fiend, Den10, Dom Kennedy, Trademark da Skydiver, Schoolboy Q, Big Sant and Currensy.

== Background ==
In August 2011, in an interview with Raw Roots, Smoke DZA spoke about what to expect from the album, saying: "You can expect the same thing. You can expect stellar production. A lot of anthems. In this particular album, I got a lot of features. Usually, I tend to dibble and dabble with features with the people I like. It’s people I listen to that I have genuine interest in. I don’t just do songs with just anyone unless it’s business but for my own purposes I always wanna do music with people that I can really have respect for. I got a lot of good features on this project, good production, good topics and a lotta anthems. I got a lot of stories to tell too so, it’ll be real cool."

== Critical reception ==
Professional ratings
Review scores
| Source | Rating |
|---|---|
| HipHopDX | 3/5 stars |
| XXL | (L) |

Rolling Stoned was met with generally positive reviews from music critics. The Company Man of HipHopDX gave the album three out of five stars, saying "Smoke DZA has always played a suitable Robin and, on Rolling Stoned, he’s still a ways away from driving the Bat Mobile. Maybe that’s why there’s twelve guest appearances on a thirteen track album. Maybe he feels he resonates more in limited doses. With only four solo joints, it’s difficult to get a feel for the artist. Instead, he flaunts the caricature while the person behind "The Kushed God" is still hidden in a cloud of smoke." Neil Martinez-Belkin of XXL gave the album an L, saying "At times, the Cinematic spitter’s delivery reminds of the flamboyant slick type of flow that has defined Harlem rappers, and over the laidback buoyant production, it’s a unique sound. But with the subject matter so limited, George Kush sometimes sells himself short. But Rolling Stoned results in a fun listen, however predictable it may be. While there’s room for growth, Smoke DZA has put together another solid project that’s sure to keep his growing group of Dziples asking for more. Rrrright."

== Track listing ==
| No. | Title | Producer(s) | Length |
|---|---|---|---|
| 1. | "The Wonderful World of the Kushedgod" | 183rd | 1:50 |
| 2. | "He Has Risen" | Beats by Ned | 2:13 |
| 3. | "Loudest Batch" (featuring Den10) | 183rd | 2:23 |
| 4. | "On the Corner" (featuring Bun B and Big K.R.I.T.) | Big K.R.I.T. | 3:09 |
| 5. | "Ball Game" (featuring Kendrick Lamar) | 183rd | 2:24 |
| 6. | "We Out" | Cardo | 3:10 |
| 7. | "4 Loko" (featuring ASAP Rocky) | 183rd | 3:19 |
| 8. | "Notorious" (featuring Fiend and Big Sant) | 183rd | 4:45 |
| 9. | "Pow Wow" (featuring Dom Kennedy) | 183rd | 2:28 |
| 10. | "Quiet" | Omen | 3:05 |
| 11. | "Overhigh" (featuring Trademark da Skydiver and Schoolboy Q) | V-Don | 4:17 |
| 12. | "Personal Party" (featuring Currensy) | V-Don | 4:09 |
| Total length: | | | 40:35 |

MP3 bonus track
| No. | Title | Length |
|---|---|---|
| 13. | "Live Life" (featuring Marz Lovejoy) | 3:22 |

== Charts ==
| Chart (2011) | Peak position |
|---|---|
| US Top R&B/Hip-Hop Albums (Billboard) | 65 |
| US Heatseekers Albums (Billboard) | 29 |
