= Coke Boys 3 =

Mixtape by Coke Boys
- Released: April 13, 2012
- Recorded: 2011
- Genre: Hip hop
- Labels: Coke Boys Records, Evil Empire
- Producers: Harry Fraud; Lex Luger; The Heatmakerz; Honorable C.N.O.T.E.; Vinyl Shotz; Pryme & Keyz; INKomplete Beatz; byG Byrd

Coke Boys chronology
Coke Boys 2 (2011)	Coke Boys 3 (2012)	Coke Boys 4 (2014)

Coke Boys 3: Niggas Wit Coke (or simply Coke Boys 3) is a mixtape by American hip hop group Coke Boys, released on April 13, 2012. The mixtape features appearances from members signed to the Coke Boys Records label including Chinx Drugz, Charlie Rock, Cheeze, and Flip, alongside guest appearances from Rick Ross, Akon, Mac Miller, Wale, Red Café, Stack Bundles, and other rappers.

== Track listing ==
No.	Title	Producer(s)	Length
1.	"Intro"	The Heatmakerz	2:56
2.	"Burnin'" (French Montana and Chinx Drugz featuring Akon and Kevin Gates)	Akon	3:38
3.	"9000 Watts" (French Montana, Cheeze, Charlie Rock, and Chinx Drugz)	Lex Luger (record producer)	5:32
4.	"Celebration" (French Montana and Chinx Drugz)		2:01
5.	"Headquarter" (French Montana and Chinx Drugz featuring Red Café)	Cardiak	5:02
6.	"Drank & Smoke" (French Montana featuring Mac Miller)	Mike Will Made It	3:29
7.	"Everywhere We Go" (French Montana featuring Wale)	Pryme & Keyz	3:16
8.	"Make Money" (French Montana and Chinx Drugz)	SupaNatra	4:23
9.	"Pussy Quint" (Skit)		4:57
10.	"Husband or Wife" (French Montana & Nawlage)	Vinyl Shotz of NdroiDBeats	3:46
11.	"Ballin'" (French Montana featuring Charlie Hustle and Rick Ross)	Icon	2:45
12.	"Dope Got Me Rich" (Chinx Drugz and French Montana)	Speaker Knockerz	3:16
13.	"100" (French Montana, Cheeze, and Chinx Drugz)	Byg Byrd	4:09
14.	"Haven't Spoke" (French Montana and Chinx Drugz)	INKompleteBeatz	2:22
15.	"Dirty Money" (French Montana featuring L.E.P. Bogus Boyz)	Honorable C.N.O.T.E.	4:48
16.	"Ghostbuster" (Flip)	Aone	3:32
17.	"Cool Whip" (Charlie Rock and Cheeze)	Harry Fraud	2:21
18.	"Tap That" (French Montana and Chinx Drugz featuring Stack Bundles)	Harry Fraud	3:29
