= Smoke DZA =

American rapper (born 1984)

- Smoke DZA performing at Smoker's Club Tour in 2010

Background information
- Born: Sean Joseph Pompey; February 8, 1984 (age 42); Manhattan, New York City, U.S.
- Genre: East Coast hip-hop
- Occupations: Rapper; songwriter
- Works: Smoke DZA discography
- Years active: 2002–present
- Labels: Babygrande; Cinematic; High Times; Jet Life; R.F.C. Music Group; iHipHop Distribution; Fontana
- Website: www.smokedza.net

Sean Joseph Pompey (born February 8, 1984), better known by his stage name Smoke DZA, is an American rapper and songwriter.

== Biography ==
=== 1984–2007: Early life and career beginnings ===
Smoke DZA was born February 8, 1984, at Harlem Hospital in New York City and has lived in New York all his life. The son of two Guyanese immigrants, Smoke was exposed to music at home by his father and fell in love with hip hop at a young age. He grew up listening to and emulating fellow New Yorkers Jay-Z and Notorious BIG. After dropping out of high school to pursue his music career, DZA began battle rapping and has battled fellow Harlem-based rapper J.R. Writer. Smoke DZA decided on his moniker after being influenced by Chris Tucker's character Smokey from the movie Friday and the acronym DZA stands for "Dream Zone Achieve". He was discovered by Jonny Shipes of Cinematic Music Group in 2002 and went on to ghostwrite for numerous rappers, including Hi-Tek. In 2002, he partnered to become one half of the group Smoke & Numbers, until going solo in 2008.

=== 2008–2016: Rugby Thompson, Dream.Zone.Achieve and Don't Smoke Rock ===
Since splitting from Smoke & Numbers to pursue a solo career, DZA has released a string of mixtapes including Substance Abuse, Substance Abuse 1.5, George Kush The Button, Rolling Stoned, Sweet Baby Kushed God, Cuz I Felt Like It and K.O.N.Y. He has worked with Big K.R.I.T., Wiz Khalifa, and ASAP Rocky among others and is a founding member of the Smokers Club. His album, Rolling Stoned was awarded the High Times Doobie Award for Hip Hop album of the year for 2011. His album Rugby Thompson was released in June 2012 by High Times and Cinematic Music Group. The album was produced entirely by Harry Fraud. The album features numerous artists including Action Bronson, Currensy, Domo Genesis, Schoolboy Q and ASAP Twelvyy.

On April 1, 2014, Smoke DZA released Dream.Zone.Achieve, his third studio album. The album consisted of 21 songs broken down into three sections, Dream, Zone and Achieve, each with 7 tracks. Features included fellow Harlem native Cam'ron, Joey Bada$$, Ab-Soul, Wiz Khalifa and Curren$y.

On April 6, 2014, in the midst of WrestleMania XXX, Smoke DZA released a mixtape titled Ringside 2, the second installment in his wrestling-inspired Ringside EP series. Production was handled his by fellow R.F.C. member 183rd, with features from Peter Rosenberg, then WWE Intercontinental Champion Big E Langston, Aston Matthews and Flatbush Zombies.

On December 2, 2016, he and Pete Rock released Don't Smoke Rock, featuring 13 songs with guest appearances from Rick Ross, Dave East, Cam'ron, Big K.R.I.T. and Mac Miller.

=== 2017-present: Homegrown and Full Court Press ===
Smoke DZA released his eight album, Homegrown, on October 2, 2020. It marks his fourth project of the year, following the acclaimed A Closed Mouth Don't Get Fed, Ringside 8 and The Smokers Club Presents: Smoke DZA's Worldwide Smoke Session, the latter of which was released on April 20. Homegrown is an ode to his native New York City.

He released his 22nd EP, a political EP encouraging people to vote in the 2026 elections titled We Outside, on November 2, 2026.

== Musical style and influences ==
Smoke cites fellow New York natives Jay-Z and Notorious B.I.G. as his main influences. As an adolescent he would use their songs and write his own lyrics, helping him learn rhyming patterns."I used to re-write Biggie. It started with 'Mo Money, Mo Problems.' I would switch up the words, make it my own." He has also cited fellow Harlem rappers like Mase, Big L and Dipset as influences and inspiration. Though he is often mistakenly classified as a weed rapper, Smoke considers himself a lifestyle rapper and prefers not to be confined to one genre of rap. DZA's albums and mixtapes often feature many collaborative tracks. DZA says he enjoys collaborating with fellow artists like Dom Kennedy and Kendrick Lamar as he feels it helps him "step his ball game up" in terms of his craft.

== Personal life ==
DZA is a fan of professional wrestling. In 2016, he endorsed Bernie Sanders' presidential bid.

== Discography ==
- Rolling Stoned (2011)
- Rugby Thompson (2012)
- Dream. Zone. Achieve (2014)
- He Has Risen (2016)
- Don't Smoke Rock (with Pete Rock) (2016)
- Not for Sale (2018)
- A Closed Mouth Don't Get Fed (2020)
- Homegrown (2020)
- Full Court Press (with Girl Talk, Wiz Khalifa, and Big K.R.I.T.) (2022)
