= Harry Fraud =

American music producer (born 1987)

- Born: Rory William Quigley; January 26, 1987 (age 39); New York City, U.S.
- Genre: Hip-hop
- Occupations: Record producer; songwriter
- Years active: 2006–present
- Labels: Surf School; Coke Boys; Priority; Scion AV
- Website: harryfraud.com

Rory William Quigley (born January 26, 1987), known professionally as Harry Fraud, is an American record producer. Primarily a hip hop producer, Fraud began interning at a recording studio after graduating high school. He was discovered by French Montana in early 2009, during a recording session in New York's Chinatown, and Fraud has since worked on each of his releases and became a fixture in the New York underground hip hop scene.

He was credited on Montana's 2012 single, "Shot Caller", which became one of the most added tracks on urban contemporary radio during 2011–2012. Fraud has since produced projects such as Flight 2011 (2011) with Chinx Drugz, Rugby Thompson (2012) with Smoke DZA, Cigarette Boats (2012) with Curren$y—which was awarded XXL's "2012 EP of the Year"—Saaab Stories (2013) with Action Bronson, which served as the latter's major-label debut, and The Appetizer (2014) with French Montana. On March 8, 2013, he released his debut mixtape Adrift. That same year, Fraud teamed up with carmaker Scion to produce the compilation EP Scion A/V Presents: High Tide released on May 7, and on May 10 released his instrumental EP Royal Palm. In April 2014, he released his instrumental EP Blue/Green. Fraud has done production for various high-profile artists such as Rick Ross, Prodigy, Pusha T, Playboi Carti and Talib Kweli, among others. He has also worked on production for the International Emmy Awards.

== Career ==
=== Early life and career ===
Harry Fraud comes from a musical family background, where his parents performed in a band together. His father is a guitar player, while his mother is a singer. His father was in the concert business, which gave Fraud access to instruments and recording equipment at an early age. He received his first turntables on Christmas, and the next year had gotten what he describes as a "piece of shit sampler". It's after acquiring his first MPC that he began seriously working on beat production.

Upon graduating from high school, Fraud began interning at a recording studio, which became his first exposure to Pro Tools. He was also influenced by Fafu of BlesteNation, who was a producer at the same building. After getting into college, he acquired Pro Tools for himself, quickly immersing himself in front of the computer and becoming his main distraction, "I didn't do any [school] work. I wouldn't even go to class. It was terrible," claimed Fraud in an interview with Nah Right. During his time in college, he met his friend Red Walrus – now the musical director of the band which Fraud works with – where the two bonded over digging through crates and buying vinyl records from places such as Goodwill and the Salvation Army. His musical composition has been used by the International Emmy Awards, which Fraud credits his father for getting through to its producers. Fraud's composition work would go on to be praised by Simon Cowell, who, at the 2010 Emmy Awards ceremony took notice of Fraud's walk up music, even requesting it be replayed briefly during his speech.

=== French Montana and the Coke Boys ===
Harry Fraud rose to prominence through his collaboration with French Montana on the song "New York Minute", featuring Jadakiss, off of French's fifth mixtape Mac Wit Da Cheese released on April 19, 2009. In a 2013 interview with Rolling Stone magazine, Harry Fraud revealed first meeting close friend and artist French Montana during a recording session at a studio in Chinatown. Fraud recalls recording a song for someone which French happened to have a guest feature on. In an unusual turn of events, the building was raided by police after a tip-off that there were counterfeit Gucci and Louis Vuitton purses being manufactured at the same building. Having lost his studio spot, Fraud went on to form his own studio in Brooklyn, where the two "met and formed a bond".

Following the release of "New York Minute", the two artists would go on to record "We Playin In The Wind" off of French Montana's sixth mixtape The Laundry Man 2, released on June 29, 2009. An extended version of the song would be included on French's seventh mixtape Cocaine Konvicts released on September 25. Since then, Harry Fraud's production has been a staple among French's music, becoming Fraud's gateway to working with other high-profile artists since then. With the success of "New York Minute", rapper Ma$e had approached French Montana to hop on the remix, released on French's eighth mixtape Coke Wave 2 in November that year. Fraud would go on to produce several tracks off of French's ninth mixtape Mac & Cheese 2 released on May 6, 2010, and French's tenth mixtape Coke Boys released on September 15, collaborating with Coke Boys rappers Chinx Drugz, Cheeze, Flip and Brock.

He gained mainstream attention when his track with French Montana "Shot Caller" became one of the most added tracks on urban contemporary radio in 2011–2012. The song which was re-released as a single on January 10, 2012, was originally off of French's eleventh mixtape Mister 16: Casino Life released on February 15, 2011. Harry Fraud executive produced the overall mixtape, and his subsequent twelfth mixtape Coke Boys 2 released on August 19 of that same year. Through French, Fraud was introduced to his fellow Coke Boy rapper Chinx Drugz. The two would go on to work on their collaborative mixtape Flight 2011 which was released on March 11, 2011, and several tracks off of his subsequent Cocaine Riot mixtape released on April 19 that year. Fraud's production would also be included in French's collaborative mixtape with Juicy J and Project Pat Cocaine Mafia released on December 20, 2011. By 2012, with the popularity of "Shot Caller", a remix was released featuring rappers Rick Ross and Diddy.

=== 2012–present: Cigarette Boats, Adrift and Saaab Stories ===
On July 10, 2012, Fraud and rapper Currensy released a collaborative EP mixtape titled Cigarette Boats, which XXL would go on to award its "2012 EP of the Year." On March 8, 2013, Fraud released his debut mixtape titled Adrift, that has 115,000 downloads as of April 21, 2013, on DatPiff. The mixtape features guest appearances from Action Bronson, Bun B, Slim Thug, Rick Ross, French Montana, Prodigy, Wiz Khalifa, Juicy J, Kool G Rap, Trae tha Truth, Mac Miller, Chinx Drugz, Currensy, Chevy Woods, Danny Brown and Pusha T among many others. The mixtape is entirely self-produced and does not include any vocals of his.

On April 8, 2013, Fraud and rapper Eddie B released a collaborative EP mixtape titled Horsepower through Man Bites Dog Records. Fraud also released an EP through Scion AV on May 7, 2013, titled Scion A/V Presents: High Tide. The free EP features guest appearances by Earl Sweatshirt, Tech N9ne, French Montana, Action Bronson, Riff Raff, Mistah F.A.B., Troy Ave, Smoke DZA and Chinx Drugz. On the same day he released an EP on iTunes of instrumentals all produced by himself titled Royal Ralm. On June 11, 2013, Fraud released his collaboration project with Action Bronson titled, Saaab Stories. The project featured collaborations with Raekwon, Wiz Khalifa and Prodigy. It debuted at #63 on the Billboard 200.

On July 22, 2013, it was announced that Fraud's Surf School record label signed to the new Priority Records which operates under Capitol Music Group. He has promised a project with French Montana to be released after Montana's album Excuse My French (2013). He also revealed plans to release a collaboration mixtape with Riff Raff and his debut album in late 2013. Fraud and Eddie B also announced they would release a full-length album titled Paper, Piff & Polo during 2013. On October 6, 2013, Smoke DZA announced he would release a collaboration EP with Currensy, entirely produced by Harry Fraud. He has said he wants to work with New York rappers Jay-Z and Cam'ron in the future. Fraud has called The Alchemist as his favorite producer.

== Production style ==
Harry Fraud's production has been described as "New York tinged, sample heavy, foggy music." His production leans heavily on samples, and he's become known for turning obscure tracks into hard-knocking beats. In an interview with HipHopDX Fraud described his style saying, "What's most important to me with production is that I'm just always trying to do something unique. If I approach a production—whether it be sample-based or starting with something that originates in my head—I always try to do it in a way that is not typical at all. So if it's something that I feel where I might be going down a path that sounds too much like what's going on now, I'll make sure to try and take a left turn and do something that's my own. I try not to have a style, so to speak." Fraud went on to describe the use of drums on his beats stating, "I'm more about trying to have a strong drum presence—whether the drum is a big, huge snare or a little, tiny rimshot—I wanna make sure that the presence of the drums is felt no matter what." Fraud's signature tag at the beginning of his productions consists of singer Fanesha Fabre saying "La musica de Harry Fraud".

== Surf School Recordings ==
In 2012, Harry Fraud founded his own record label "Surf School Recordings", the name a tribute to Max B and Fraud's own passion for surfing. His father, who was a frequent traveler, was a surfer who would often take Fraud on trips with him where he discovered his passion for surfing. In 2013, Fraud signed a deal making it an imprint under Priority Records. In a 2014 interview with Life+Times he noted,

The SRFSCHL label comes from the concept of what Max B brought to the light with "the wave" and his philosophy and what me and French have been carrying on. It also kind of came out of me being into surfing. I feel like people get a lot of influence off of the stuff we do. We're teaching people how to ride the wave anyway, just off of them listening to our music. I'm a deeply philosophical person, so SRFSCHL has since taken on many different meanings.

== Discography ==
=== Albums ===
Studio albums

- Rugby Thompson (with Smoke DZA) (2012)
- Paper, Piff, & Polo (with Eddie B) (2013)
- He Has Risen (with Smoke DZA) (2016)
- The OutRunners (with Curren$y) (2020)
- The Director's Cut (with Curren$y) (2020)
- Keep Going (with Larry June) (2020)
- The Fraud Department (with Jim Jones) (2021)
- Borrowed Time (with Dark Lo) (2021)
- Hoffa (with Dave East) (2021)
- Montega (with French Montana) (2022)
- You Take the Credit, We'll Take the Check (with Jay Worthy) (2022)
- Beyond Belief (with 38 Spesh) (2022)
- Virtuoso (with Valee) (2023)
- THE AM3RICAN DREAM (with Jay Worthy & Kamaiyah) (2023)
- Life After Neph (with RXK Nephew) (2023)
- The Bricktionary (with Boldy James) (2024)
- Never Catch Us (with Curren$y) (2025)
- ERGONOMICS (with Valee) (2025)
- Made by Dope (with Bruiser Wolf) (2025)
- Price of Pain (with Dave East) (2026)

EPs

- Cigarette Boats (with Curren$y) (2012)
- Royal Palm (2013) (instrumental album)
- Saaab Stories (with Action Bronson) (2013)
- Glass (with Meyhem Lauren) (2018)
- The Marina (with Curren$y) (2018)
- Glass 2.0 (with Meyhem Lauren) (2020)
- Eat When You're Hungry, Sleep When You're Tired (with Jay Worthy) (2020)
- Bonus Footage (with Curren$y) (2020)
- The Plugs I Met 2 (with Benny the Butcher) (2021)
- Regatta (with Curren$y) (2021)
- High Fashion (with Lil Peep) (2021)
- Vices (with Curren$y) (2023)
- Lavish Misery (with Ransom) (2024)
- P Got Game (with Premo Rice) (2024)
- Gotti Pack (with $ha Hef) (2025)
- Roofless Records for Drop Tops: Disc 2 (with Curren$y & Wiz Khalifa) (2026)
- Off to the Races (with Curren$y) (2026)

=== Mixtapes ===
LPs

- B4 (with Various of BlesteNation) (2009)
- Flight 2011 (with Chinx Drugz) (2011)
- One Way Out (with Star Bred) (2011)
- Rob Zombie (with Isaiah Toothtaker & Rapewolf) (2012)
- Adrift (with various artists) (2013)
- Horsepower (with Eddie B) (2013)
- The Johnny Utah Story (with Eddie B) (2013)
- M.I.N.K.S. (with Daytona) (2015)
- Rogues Playlist Vol.1 (compilation) (2015)
- Rogues Playlist Vol.2 (compilation) (2016)
- The Coast (with various artists) (2017)

EPs

- The Lucky 7 (with Eddie B) (2011)
- Scion A/V Presents: High Tide (with various artists) (2013)
- The Stage (with Curren$y & Smoke DZA) (2013)
- Projection (with Adrian Lau) (2014)
- Mac & Cheese: The Appetizer (with French Montana) (2014)
- Blue / Green (instrumental album) (2015)
- Visionary (with Haze) (2015)
