= Black Hollywood (album) =

Studio album by Camp Lo
- Released: July 24, 2007
- Recorded: 2006–2007
- Genre: Hip hop
- Label: Good Hands
- Producer: Ski Beatz

Camp Lo chronology
Let's Do It Again (2002)	Black Hollywood (2007)	Another Heist (2009)

Black Hollywood is the third album by hip hop duo Camp Lo, released on July 24, 2007, on Good Hands Records. It was the duo's first album in five years. The album was produced by long-time collaborator Ski, who had produced the majority of the group's first two albums, Uptown Saturday Night and Let's Do It Again. The album features guest appearances from Ski and Jungle Brown, who appeared on the duo's debut. The album's first single was "Black Hollywood".

The album's original title was A Piece of the Action, a reference to the Sidney Poitier–Bill Cosby film A Piece of the Action. The group's previous albums were also named after films starring Poitier and Cosby. "Ganja Lounge" contains a sample from the voiceover at the beginning of the 1995 film Friday.

== Critical reception ==
Professional ratings
Review scores
Source	Rating
AllMusic	3.5/5 stars
HipHopDX	3/5
No Ripcord	7.5/10
Pitchfork	7.4/10
RapReviews	8.0/10

The Washington Post wrote that the album "reinvigorates the rappers' long-standing penchant for alliteration and blaxploitation."

== Track listing ==
#	Title	Producer(s)	Performer (s)
1	"Posse from the Bronx"	Ski Beatz	Geechi Suede, Sonny Cheeba
2	"82 Afros"	Ski Beatz	Geechi Suede, Sonny Cheeba, Ski
3	"Soul Fever"	Ski Beatz	Geechi Suede, Sonny Cheeba
4	"Pushahoe"	Ski Beatz	Geechi Suede, Sonny Cheeba
5	"Suga Willie's Revenge"	Ski Beatz	Geechi Suede, Sonny Cheeba, Jungle Brown
6	"Jack n' Jill"	Ski Beatz	Geechi Suede, Sonny Cheeba
7	"Material"	Ski Beatz	Geechi Suede, Sonny Cheeba
8	"Money Clap"	Ski Beatz	Geechi Suede, Sonny Cheeba
9	"Ganja Lounge"	Ski Beatz	Geechi Suede, Sonny Cheeba
10	"Black Hollywood"	Ski Beatz	Geechi Suede, Sonny Cheeba
11	"Zoom"	Ski Beatz	Geechi Suede, Sonny Cheeba
12	"Sweet Claudine"	Ski Beatz	Geechi Suede, Sonny Cheeba

== Album singles ==
Single information
"Black Hollywood"
- Released: July 24, 2007
- B-Side: "Soul Fever"
