= A Piece of the Action =

A Piece of the Action or Piece of the Action may refer to:

- "Piece of the Action", a 1981 song by Bucks Fizz
- "Piece of the Action" (Meat Loaf song) (1984)
- A Piece of the Action (film), a 1977 American comedy crime film
  - A Piece of the Action (soundtrack)
- "A Piece of the Action" (Star Trek: The Original Series), a 1968 episode of Star Trek: The Original Series
- "A Piece of the Action" (Batman), a 1967 episode of Batman
- "A Piece of the Action", an episode of Robot Chicken
- "A Piece of the Action", an episode of Cyberchase
- "A Piece of the Action", a 1962 episode of The Alfred Hitchcock Hour
- A Piece of the Action, a 2017 three-part series of compilation albums by hip-hop duo Camp Lo
  - Black Hollywood, a 2007 album by Camp Lo, originally titled A Piece of the Action
