= Luchini AKA This Is It =

Single by Camp Lo

from the album Uptown Saturday Night
- Released: January 21, 1997
- Recorded: 1996
- Genre: Hip hop
- Length: 3:59
- Label: Arista
- Songwriters: Leon Sylvers III, Saladine Wallace, Salahadeen Wilds
- Producer: Ski

Camp Lo singles chronology
"Coolie High" (1996)	"Luchini AKA This Is It" (1997)	"Black Nostaljack" (1997)

"Luchini AKA This Is It" is the first single released from Camp Lo's debut album, Uptown Saturday Night. The song was produced by up-and-coming producer Ski and used a sample of Dynasty's 1980 song "Adventures in the Land of Music" and the drums from "All Night Long" by the Mary Jane Girls.

The song became Camp Lo's biggest hit, peaking at number 50 on the Billboard Hot 100 while also becoming a bigger hit on the Rap Singles chart where it reached number five.

== Track listing ==
=== A-side ===
1. "Luchini AKA This Is It" (Radio Edit)
2. "Luchini AKA This Is It" (Instrumental)

=== B-side ===
1. "Swing" (Radio Edit)
2. "Swing" (Instrumental)
3. "Luchini AKA This Is It" (Acappella)

== Charts ==
=== Weekly charts ===
Chart (1997)	Peak position
Billboard Hot 100	50
Billboard Hot R&B/Hip-Hop Singles & Tracks	21
Billboard Hot Rap Singles	5
Billboard Hot Dance Music/Maxi-Singles Sales	8

=== Year-end charts ===
Chart (1997)	Position
Billboard Hot R&B/Hip-Hop Singles & Tracks	85
Billboard Hot Rap Singles	19
