= Representation of African Americans in media =

The representation of African Americans in media, including speech, writing, and visual forms has been a big concern in mainstream American culture and is a component of media bias in the United States. Historically, media portrayals have often propagated controversial and misconstrued images of African Americans, leading to widespread stereotypes and misconceptions.

Research on the portrayal of African Americans in prime-time television from 1955 to 1986 found that only 6 percent of the characters were African American, while 89 percent of the TV population was white. This under-representation has shifted over time. A 2018 report from the UCLA Department of Social Sciences indicated that, despite making up less than 13 percent of the U.S. population, African Americans were over-represented among actors in broadcast scripted shows during the 2015–16 season, claiming 17 percent of the roles.

Local news media, as a primary information source for many, plays a vital role in shaping public knowledge of minority communities and influencing policy debates regarding civil rights. The U.S. Commission on Civil Rights emphasizes that local news coverage significantly impacts public understanding of minority communities and broader societal perspectives.

The debate over ownership diversity affecting content diversity contributes to the notion that for African Americans to be well represented in media, there needs to be African-American ownership within the industry. A lack of investment in Black-owned media perpetuates disparities, ultimately silencing a marginalized community and its stories. Supporting Black-owned media is crucial for ensuring diverse perspectives and accurate representation.

== Examples of misrepresentation ==
=== Little Black Sambo ===
The Story of Little Black Sambo is an 1899 children's book by Helen Bannerman about a South Indian boy who outwits a group of tigers. Although the original illustrations depicted the protagonist as Indian, later U.S. editions often featured illustrations resembling racist caricatures of Black children. Over time, the character "Sambo" became associated with stereotypes portraying Black people as simple, smiling, and docile. The name and imagery were used to infantilize Black people and reinforce racial hierarchies in American culture.

=== The "coon" caricature ===
The "coon" caricature is one of the most dehumanizing and enduring stereotypes of African Americans. Emerging in the 19th century, it portrayed Black people as lazy, cowardly, foolish, and buffoonish. Unlike the “Sambo,” who was childlike and passive, the coon was usually an adult acting immaturely. This stereotype reinforced ideas of Black incompetence and was widely used in minstrel shows and early American film.

=== Uncle Tom stereotype ===
The term "Uncle Tom" originates from the 1852 novel Uncle Tom's Cabin by Harriet Beecher Stowe. While the literary character was originally portrayed as moral and dignified, adaptations and popular culture distorted the image into a submissive and docile figure. The modern stereotype of an "Uncle Tom" refers to a Black person who is overly eager to please white authority, often criticized as betraying their racial identity. This portrayal was used to promote a palatable form of Blackness for white audiences.

=== Amos 'n' Andy ===
Amos 'n' Andy was a popular radio show that began in the 1920s and transitioned to television in the 1950s. Originally, the characters were voiced by white actors using exaggerated African-American dialects and mannerisms. When the show moved to television, Black actors were cast, but the program continued to reinforce stereotypes of African Americans as unintelligent and comical. Civil rights organizations, including the NAACP, criticized the show for its demeaning depictions and lobbied for its cancellation.

=== Al Jolson and blackface ===
Al Jolson, a vaudeville entertainer in the early 20th century, was known for his blackface performances, particularly in the 1927 film The Jazz Singer. Jolson claimed to popularize Black music with white audiences, but his performances often relied on caricatures that perpetuated racist imagery. Critics, including Black performer Bert Williams, condemned blackface as vulgar and harmful. Jolson’s popularity helped normalize blackface in American entertainment, reinforcing stereotypes of Black people as clownish and subhuman.

=== Media portrayals and Black male outcomes ===
A 2011 study by The Opportunity Agenda found that negative portrayals of Black men in television, newspapers, and video games contributed to societal bias. These depictions often linked Black men with crime, violence, and moral failure, which in turn influenced public perception, reinforced harmful stereotypes, and even correlated with health disparities like lower life expectancy. The study highlighted the need for accurate, diverse media portrayals to counterbalance these exaggerated associations.

== Representation of African-American women ==
Urban sociology researcher Sue Jewell identifies three dominant archetypes historically used to portray African-American women in media: the Mammy, the Sapphire, and the Jezebel.

=== Mammy ===
The Mammy figure is portrayed as an asexual, maternal, and devoted caretaker, often serving white families. This stereotype emerged during slavery and was used to justify the control and exploitation of Black women, portraying them as loyal, nurturing, and content in subservient roles. It was a common figure in mid-20th-century literature and film and continues to influence media portrayals today.

=== Sapphire ===
The Sapphire stereotype—popularized through shows like Amos 'n' Andy—depicts Black women as loud, angry, emasculating, and hostile. This archetype has become one of the most enduring portrayals in modern media, reinforcing the idea that Black women are inherently combative or unapproachable.

=== Jezebel ===
The Jezebel archetype depicts Black women as hyper-sexual and seductive. Historically, it was used to rationalize the sexual exploitation of Black women during slavery. Today, the stereotype persists in popular music videos and film, where Black women are often portrayed as provocative and promiscuous.

These archetypes have influenced modern media stereotypes, including the "welfare queen", "gold digger", and "video vixen"—each reinforcing negative assumptions about Black women’s character, morality, or economic status.

== Hip-hop music ==
The misrepresentation of African-American women extends prominently into the hip-hop music industry, where their bodies are often hypersexualized in music videos and lyrics. A 2022 study published in the Psi Chi Journal of Psychological Research found that exposure to objectifying portrayals of Black women in hip-hop music mediates the relationship between listening to the genre and the sexualization of Black women in everyday life.

In 2004, students at Spelman College protested rapper Nelly’s planned bone marrow drive in response to his music video “Tip Drill,” which they criticized for its degrading portrayal of women. The protest led to the event’s cancellation and sparked broader conversations about misogyny in rap.

Themes of derogatory naming, sexual objectification, and violence against women are frequently found in hip-hop lyrics, reinforcing harmful tropes and marginalizing Black women within the industry. Despite this, many Black women artists have challenged these narratives and redefined representations of Black womanhood on their own terms.

Artists such as Queen Latifah, Lauryn Hill, Salt-N-Pepa, Lil’ Kim, Missy Elliott, Nicki Minaj, and Megan Thee Stallion have used their platforms to both embrace and resist stereotypes, offering more complex portrayals of Black identity, feminism, and empowerment.

== Film ==
Quantitative research has documented a substantial long-term increase in Black representation in American films since 1980. This progress has varied with economic conditions: a 2026 study of 2,023 top domestic-grossing U.S. films found that Black actors' share of screentime was lower when credit conditions tightened and higher when GDP grew. Greater Black screentime was also associated with marginally higher domestic gross but lower international revenue share and worldwide gross.

== Television ==
=== Reality television ===
Reality television programs such as Bad Girls Club, The Real Housewives of Atlanta, and Love & Hip Hop have faced criticism for perpetuating negative stereotypes of African-American women. These portrayals often reflect previously mentioned archetypes such as the "Sapphire stereotype", "Mammy stereotype", and "Jezebel stereotype". Scholar Donnetrice Allison, Professor of Communication Studies and Africana Studies at Stockton University, argues that these programs offer a modern platform for historical stereotypes to persist in contemporary culture.

Allison’s book, Black Women's Portrayals on Reality Television: The New Sapphire, critically examines how such portrayals influence public perception, suggesting that audiences exposed to these depictions may internalize distorted and harmful views of Black women.

=== Stereotypes in television ===
Research indicates that African Americans are frequently depicted in television roles that reinforce negative stereotypes. In her study, The Perceived Realism of African American Portrayals on Television, Professor Narissra M. Punyanunt-Carter of Texas Tech University found that African American characters are often shown in service or blue-collar occupations—such as house cleaners or postal workers—in contrast to their white counterparts, who are portrayed as business executives or owners.

A 1977 report by the U.S. Commission on Civil Rights found that television portrayals of African Americans typically included negative personality traits such as inferiority, unintelligence, dishonesty, immorality, and buffoonery.

Yuki Fujioka’s study, Television Portrayals and African-American Stereotypes, highlights how television imagery affects viewers' perceptions in the absence of firsthand experience. The study revealed that American students were more influenced by negative portrayals of African Americans than Japanese students, suggesting that effective responses to such portrayals are closely tied to the development of racial stereotypes.

=== Legal framework: Metro Broadcasting v. FCC ===
The 1990 Supreme Court case Metro Broadcasting, Inc. v. FCC addressed the constitutionality of the Federal Communications Commission’s minority preference policies. The Court upheld two key policies: a preference for minority applicants in broadcast license decisions when all other factors are equal, and a “distress sale” policy allowing stations at risk of losing their licenses to be sold to minority buyers prior to formal FCC rulings.

The Court ruled that these policies were constitutional as they advanced Congress’s legitimate interest in promoting programming diversity. The justices concluded that such diversity benefits the entire public, not just minority groups, and is thus consistent with First Amendment principles.

== Beauty industry ==
=== Evolving representation and inclusivity ===
In recent years, the beauty industry has experienced a significant shift toward inclusivity, with more Black-owned beauty brands emerging to meet the specific needs of African-American consumers. Brands such as Ami Colé, founded by Diarrha N'Diaye-Mbaye, are dedicated to creating clean beauty products specifically formulated for melanin-rich skin tones.

Similarly, Shontay Lundy founded Black Girl Sunscreen to address the lack of sun protection products suitable for darker skin tones. The brand, with its mission to empower and educate consumers of color, has grown in valuation and is now available at major retailers.

Despite these strides, challenges remain. A 2023 report by McKinsey & Company noted that Black women often struggle to find meaningful beauty experiences with large, non-Black-owned brands. The report emphasized a continuing need for product development that better meets the unique needs of Black consumers.

=== Economic impact and consumer behavior ===
Black consumers are a powerful force in the beauty economy. In 2023, they spent an estimated $9.4 billion on beauty products—an increase of $1.3 billion from the previous year. However, Black-owned beauty brands represented only 2.5% of total industry revenue, highlighting a disparity between consumer investment and brand ownership.

To help bridge this gap, initiatives like the 15 Percent Pledge, founded by Aurora James, have emerged. The pledge calls on major retailers to allocate at least 15% of their shelf space to Black-owned businesses. Retailers such as Sephora have publicly committed to the pledge, helping increase visibility and access for Black entrepreneurs.

=== Health concerns and advocacy ===
Health disparities in the beauty industry have raised concern among consumer advocates. Research shows that beauty and personal care products marketed to Black women often contain disproportionately high levels of toxic ingredients, contributing to elevated risks for breast and uterine cancers.

To raise awareness, the Campaign for Safe Cosmetics launched the Black Beauty Project, which encourages the use of non-toxic products and supports Black-owned brands committed to safer alternatives.

=== Educational initiatives and innovation ===
In January 2023, Spelman College launched an online certificate program in cosmetic science. The initiative is designed to empower students, particularly women of color, with the skills needed to create and test beauty products that serve underrepresented communities. The program emphasizes both scientific rigor and cultural relevance, contributing to a more inclusive and equitable future for the beauty industry.

== Representation of Black/African-American LGBT characters ==
The 1990s saw an increase in the representation of LGBT characters in film and television. While the visibility of LGBT characters of color has grown since then, the majority are still portrayed as gay white males.

The media advocacy organization GLAAD publishes two annual reports tracking LGBTQ+ representation: the Studio Responsibility Index (SRI) and Where We Are On TV (WWAT). The first SRI in 2013 found that of the 101 films released by major studios in 2012, only 14 included LGBTQ+ characters. Of the 31 total LGBTQ+ characters, only four were Black/African-American—just 12.9%—compared to 26 white characters (83.9%). By 2016, the number increased slightly to 23 LGBTQ+ characters in 125 films, with 13% being Black.

The WWAT reports show a similar trend. In 2013, 13% of LGBTQ+ characters on broadcast and cable were Black, while 71% were white. In 2017, there were 329 LGBTQ+ characters on TV, of which 40 (12%) were Black, compared to 65% white.

Organizations like the Pacific Center for Human Growth and Color of Change have criticized these portrayals, stating that Black LGBTQ+ characters are often written as one-dimensional stereotypes rather than fully realized individuals. Critics also argue that Black characters are often inserted into “hegemonic white worlds” that erase their cultural background and struggles.

=== Stereotypes and masculinity in media ===
According to Dustin Collins, Black gay men are typically portrayed as either flamboyant "swishy queens" or overly aggressive figures. The character Keith Charles in Six Feet Under was analyzed by Jay Poole as embodying hypermasculinity, aggression, and power—stereotypes often associated with Black men—especially in contrast to his white partner David, who is depicted as more feminine and domestic.

Similarly, Lafayette Reynolds in True Blood was seen as a “swishy queen” stereotype: flamboyant, muscular, and aggressive. In contrast, Jennifer De Clue praises the film Moonlight for breaking away from this mold. Its protagonist, Chiron Harris, is sensitive and vulnerable, challenging the traditional narrative of Black masculinity.

A 2019 study by Jared Hudson analyzed portrayals of Black gay men in 14 films and identified three dominant themes:

- Masculinity Wins: Effeminate characters often "redeem" themselves through hypermasculinity (e.g., Lola in Kinky Boots).
- Masculinity as an Artifice: Characters adopt hypermasculinity to avoid stigma (e.g., Hooper in Chasing Amy).
- Humanizing Portrayals: Independent productions like Noah's Arc and Dear White People depict Black gay men with emotional complexity.

Hudson argues that mainstream cinema often reduces Black gay men to flat stereotypes, while independent media explores their identities with greater nuance.

=== Digital activism and trans representation ===
Black trans and queer women have increasingly turned to digital platforms to share their stories and challenge mainstream stereotypes. Scholar Moya Bailey (2014) documents how platforms like Twitter and Tumblr are used by Black trans women to create support networks, share health resources, and assert autonomy outside the biomedical model.

Janet Mock’s hashtag #GirlsLikeUs, launched in 2012, created a space for trans women of color to counter harmful narratives and connect over shared experiences. After the murder of Melony Smith, a Black trans woman, activists used social media to correct her misgendering and amplify her story.

Publications like Freeing Ourselves: A Guide to Health and Self Love by the Brown Boi Project further this movement, offering zines by and for masculine-of-center people of color. These resources focus on holistic health and community empowerment.

Bailey stresses that while media representation matters, systemic change is essential to address the real-world violence and healthcare disparities Black trans women face.

=== Black lesbians and transgender tropes in media ===
Black lesbian characters are often sexualized or masculinized. In Set It Off, Ursula appears only as an erotic figure, while her partner Cleo is portrayed as aggressive and butch. The Wire presents Shakima Greggs as a masculine figure within the police department, and Felicia “Snoop” Pearson blurs gender lines to the point of androgyny.

Transgender women in media are often shown as “passing” to the extent that they are perceived as artificial or deceptive. The Netflix series Orange Is the New Black features Sophia Burset, a Black trans woman whose femininity is frequently questioned. Critics argue that her depiction reinforces stereotypes of trans women as hyperfeminine and defined by their appearance or beauty work.

Across TV and film, Black LGBTQ+ characters are also disproportionately linked to narratives involving drugs, violence, and poverty. These patterns reinforce broader cultural stereotypes that portray Black people—and especially queer Black individuals—as unstable or criminal.

== Sports ==
In sports that are featured in media such as on ESPN and some other sports channels, representation of African-American men and women is important. In the past, segregation played a part in representation of the community. “In baseball, there were established ‘Negro’ leagues for non-white players (while these leagues were predominantly African-American, there were also several Latin-Americans playing in the leagues, as well) through the early 1950s” (Keifer, Mitchell). In her article, Andrea Eagleman talks about the history of the representation. “Research shows that racial and ethnic minority athletes and international athletes have long been portrayed in stereotypical roles in the mass media since the 1880s, when Black players were stereotyped…”(Eagleman, Andrea).

== Reasons for misrepresentation ==
=== Working in the media ===
Historically, the participation in media production by minorities in the US has been low. Despite recent gains especially in television, significant racial disparities remain. In 1971, three years after the Federal Communications Commission adopted rules to foster more diverse programming, only nine percent of full-time employees in radio and television were visible minorities. In 1978, American Society of News Editors set a goal to have their sector mirror the diversity of the American population in general.

As the years progressed, the percentage of minorities in the workplace began to grow; in 1997, visible minorities made up 20 percent of the broadcasting work force. Yet the trend towards inclusiveness, while generally growing, has been uneven. For example, a 2007 report showed that blacks, Latinos, Asians, and Native Americans made up only 13.65 percent of American newsrooms. The numbers dwindle still further at the upper levels of media management: during the 2013–2014 season only 5.5 percent of executive-level television producers were people of color.

=== Ownership ===
Ownership in the media helps control what media is being broadcast, which also helps define who and how people are being portrayed. There is a significant under representation of African Americans when it comes to the ownership of media. A report by the Free Press entitled "Off The Dial" reports of all commercial broadcast radio stations, African Americans own only 3.4 percent. In populations with large African-American markets, the number of black-owned stations are not correlated with the large market. Difficulty with capital access along with other barriers to entry may be the cause. African-American owners may be purchasing broadcast stations in the only place they can – small mid-western markets, due to racism in small southern communities where the black population exists in the majority. Therefore, a valuable media perspective is lost in these communities.

=== Stereotypes ===
Communication and media research suggest that the mass media is an important source of information about African Americans and their image. This public image influences public perception, and is capable of reinforcing opinions about African Americans.

Typically, these opinions are unfavorable and highlight negative stereotypes associated with African Americans. Oftentimes the portrayals' very medium, such as television, is the origin of such stereotypes. Television has been cited for broadcasting material that displays an over-representation of African Americans as lawbreakers. A study of TV crime newscasts indicated that newscast content displayed far more counts of African Americans' crimes than that of any other racial classification.

The representation of African Americans in media has remained the same for a while, almost since the representation of African Americans in television ads exceeded in 1991. It has been shown that even positive stereotypes of African Americans in media can have an effect of prejudice on consumers. The roles of African Americans in media has evolved over time. On typical cable channels the amount of ads shown with African Americans has become neutral, but on channels such as BET, where the viewership is mostly that of African Americans, all of the ads consist of healthy, stable, independent and enthusiastic African Americans who are goal oriented. African Americans now have bigger roles in media such as that of reporters, business owners and artists. African-American women have made an uprising in mainstream media as confident and strong individuals. Several organizations have been based on the empowerment of African-American women in media. The representation of African-American women in media has also made an increase since beauty expectations have changed. Cultural appropriation has somewhat changed the beauty standards of media. Fashion styles have taken on the cultural dynamics of many countries.

== Minority Ownership Task Force ==
The lack of representation has spawned a number of U.S. Federal Communications Commission (FCC) initiatives to increase diversity. In 1969 the Supreme Court ruled that the implicated FCC regulations that were designed to increase viewpoint diversity were not in conflict with the First Amendment, and the people "as a whole" retain their interest in free speech and the right to have "diverse programming" via the constitution. In the 1960s the release of a report by the National Advisory Commission on Civil Disorders (the Kerner Commission) reported that the "media" did not effectively communicate to the majority of their decidedly white audience the sense of "degradation, misery, and hopelessness of living in the ghetto."

The commission also continued to report that unless the media became more sensitive to the portrayal of African Americans specifically, the degrading stereotypical content would continue to be displayed. In response to this commission, the FCC initiated a race-neutral regulatory policy to increase the likelihood that African Americans would be employed with a broadcaster. This included changing hiring practices of broadcasters to eliminate racial discrimination from the employment process. However, despite these rules, the FCC found that levels of representation did not change significantly.

To continue its effort to provide access to the "minority voice", the FCC established the Minority Ownership Task Force (MOTF). This group would focus on researching ways to include minorities in the broadcasting industry. The FCC notes that having a sufficient representation of the minority would be serving the needs of not only the interests of the minority community, but would "enrich and educate" the majority.

== See also ==
- African-American representation in Hollywood
- Early film racism in the United States
- Misogyny in hip hop culture
- Portrayal of black people in comics
- Racial bias in criminal news in the United States
- Video vixen
- Media portrayal of LGBT people
- Stereotypes of African Americans
- Metro Broadcasting, Inc. v. FCC
