= Let's Do It Again (Camp Lo album) =

Studio album by Camp Lo
- Released: May 21, 2002
- Recorded: 2001–2002
- Studio: Now City Recordings (North Carolina)
- Genre: Hip-hop
- Length: 48:17
- Label: Dymond Crook
- Producers: Jocko; Ski Beatz

Camp Lo chronology
Uptown Saturday Night (1997)	Let's Do It Again (2002)	Black Hollywood (2007)

Singles from Let's Do It Again
- 1. "Glow / Gorilla Pimp" Released: 2002; 2. "How U Walkin’ / Crookz" Released: 2002

Professional ratings
Review scores
Source	Rating
AllMusic	2.5/5 stars
RapReviews	5/10

Let's Do It Again is the second studio album by American hip-hop duo Camp Lo. It was released on May 21, 2002 via Dymond Crook Records. Produced by Ski and Jocko, it features a sole guest appearance from Handsome and contributions from Chris Stowe, Robin Guines, Jocko and Mecca. In the United States, the album debuted at number 64 on the Top R&B/Hip-Hop Albums and number 28 on the Independent Albums charts.

The album's title is a reference to the 1975 film Let's Do It Again.

== Track listing ==
No.	Title	Writer(s)	Producer(s)	Length
1.	"Gotcha"	Saladine T. Wallace; Salahadeen Wilds; David Willis	Ski	3:20
2.	"Let's Do It Again"	Wallace; Wilds; Willis; Zulema Cusseaux	Ski	3:42
3.	"Glow"	Wallace; Wilds; Willis	Ski	4:06
4.	"8 Moons Ago"	Wallace; Wilds; Willis	Ski	3:22
5.	"How U Walkin'"	Wallace; Wilds; Willis	Ski	3:21
6.	"Black Connect II"	Wallace; Wilds; Willis	Ski	5:58
7.	"Soul Train"	Wallace; Wilds; Willis; Norman Whitfield; Barrett Strong	Ski	3:32
8.	"Gorilla Pimp"	Wallace; Wilds; Willis	Ski	3:30
9.	"China Soul"	Wallace; Wilds	Jocko	3:40
10.	"Macadame"	Wallace; Wilds; Willis; Joe Quinde	Ski	3:20
11.	"Turbo Ozone" (featuring Handsome)	Wallace; Wilds; Willis	Ski	3:49
12.	"Carnival 4 Sha"	Wallace; Wilds; Willis	Ski	4:01
13.	"Sky Box"	Wallace; Wilds	Jocko	2:36
Total length:				48:17

== Personnel ==
- Salahadeen "Sonny Cheeba" Wilds – vocals
- Saladine "Geechi Suede" Wallace – vocals
- Robin Guines – vocals (tracks: 2, 9)
- Chris Stowe – vocals (tracks: 4, 7, 10, 11)
- Anthony "Jocko" Roberts – vocals (track 4), producer (tracks: 9, 13)
- Handsome – rap vocals (track 11)
- Angela "Mecca" Scott – vocals (track 13)
- David "Ski" Willis – producer (tracks: 1–8, 10–12)
- Joe Quinde – mixing
- James Cruz – mastering
- Shawn Wilson – executive producer
- Jimmy Lawson II – executive producer

== Charts ==
Chart (2002)	Peak position
US Top R&B/Hip-Hop Albums (Billboard)	64
US Independent Albums (Billboard)	28
