= Uptown Saturday Night (album) =

Studio album by Camp Lo
- Released: January 28, 1997
- Recorded: 1995–1996
- Studios: D&D Studios and New World (New York City, New York)
- Genres: East Coast hip hop; jazz rap; alternative hip hop
- Length: 54:19
- Labels: Profile; Arista
- Producers: Ill Will Fulton (exec.); Ski; Trugoy the Dove; Jocko

Camp Lo chronology
Uptown Saturday Night (1997)	Let's Do It Again (2002)

Singles from Uptown Saturday Night
- 1. "Coolie High" Released: August 22, 1995; 2. "Luchini AKA This Is It" Released: October 29, 1996; 3. "Black Nostaljack AKA Come On" Released: 1997

Uptown Saturday Night is the debut studio album from American hip hop group Camp Lo, released January 28, 1997, on Profile Records and distributed through Arista Records. The album was largely produced by Ski and spawned the hit single "Luchini AKA This Is It".

The album peaked at twenty-seven on the U.S. Billboard 200 and reached the fifth spot on the R&B Albums chart.

== Release and reception ==
Professional ratings
Review scores
Source	Rating
AllMusic	4/5 stars
Entertainment Weekly	A−
Muzik	8/10
RapReviews	10/10
The Source	3/5 stars
USA Today	3/4 stars

Uptown Saturday Night is often hailed as a classic by fans and critics. Leo Stanley of AllMusic called the album "a refreshing fusion of hip-hop, soul, and jazz that manages to avoid most jazz-rap clichés while retaining street credibility", and "a worthwhile debut".

== Cover art ==
The album cover is a homage to the painting The Sugar Shack by Ernie Barnes that was featured on the 1970s sitcom Good Times and the album cover of Marvin Gaye's I Want You.

== Track listing ==
- All tracks produced by Ski, except track 4 produced by Trugoy the Dove, track 14 co-produced by Ill Will Fulton, and track 15 co-produced by Jocko.

No.	Title	Music	Length
1.	"Krystal Karrington"	Wallace, Wilds, Willis	3:24
2.	"Luchini AKA This Is It"	Sylvers, Randolph, Smith, Spencer, Wallace, Wilds, Willis	3:59
3.	"Park Joint"	Cobham, Deodato, Wallace, Wilds, Willis	3:27
4.	"B-Side to Hollywood" (featuring Trugoy the Dove)	Jolicoeur, Wallace, Wilds	3:46
5.	"Killin' Em Softly"	Wallace, Wilds, Willis	3:43
6.	"Sparkle"	Wallace, Wilds, Willis	3:39
7.	"Black Connection"	Hugo & Luigi Chorus, Wallace, Weiss, Wilds, Willis	4:06
8.	"Swing" (featuring Butterfly)	Butler, Wallace, Willis	2:50
9.	"Rockin' It AKA Spanish Harlem"	Wallace, Wilds, Willis	3:37
10.	"Say Word" (featuring Jungle Brown)	Wallace, Wilds, Willis	3:13
11.	"Negro League" (featuring Karachi R.A.W. and Bones)	Jackson, Thomas, Wallace, Wilds, Willis	3:23
12.	"Nicky Barnes AKA It's Alright" (featuring Jungle Brown)	Wallace, Wallace, Wilds, Willis	3:13
13.	"Black Nostaljack AKA Come On"	Fulton, Sigler, Wallace, Wilds, Willis	4:12
14.	"Coolie High"	Roberts, Wallace, Wilds, Willis	4:00
15.	"Sparkle (Mr. Midnight Mix)"	Wallace, Wilds, Willis	3:47

== Charts ==
=== Weekly charts ===
Chart (1997)	Peak position
US Billboard 200	27
US Top R&B/Hip-Hop Albums (Billboard)	5

=== Year-end charts ===
Chart (1997)	Position
US Top R&B/Hip-Hop Albums (Billboard)	92

=== Singles ===
Year	Single	Peak chart positions			
Year	Single	U.S. Billboard Hot 100	U.S. Hot Dance Music/Maxi-Singles Sales	U.S. Hot R&B/Hip-Hop Singles & Tracks	U.S. Hot Rap Singles
1996	"Coolie High"	—	—	62	—
1996	"Luchini AKA This Is It"	50	8	21	5
1996	"Black Nostaljack AKA Come On"	—	24	—	—

== Personnel ==
- art direction – Carla Leighton
- artwork – Dr. Revolt
- assistant engineering – Dejuana Perignon, Dexter Thibou, Max Vargas
- bass – Joe Quinde
- design – Carla Leighton
- engineering – Guido, Joe Quinde
- executive production – Ill Will Fulton
- illustrations – Dr. Revolt
- mastering – Alan Douches
- mixing – Guido, Kenny Ortíz, Joe Quinde
- multi-instruments – Joe Mendelson
- performer(s) – The Bones
- photography – Christian Lantry
- piano – Pete Levin
- production – Joe "Ski" Chink, Ill Will Fulton, Jocko, Trugoy the Dove
- vibraphone – Bill Ware
- vocals – Tracey Amos
- vocals (background) – Bill Ware

Source: Allmusic
