= African-American representation in Hollywood =

Diversity issue in American films

The presence of African Americans in major motion picture roles has stirred controversy and been limited dating back decades due to lingering racism following slavery and segregation. "Through most of the 20th century, images of African-Americans in advertising were mainly limited to servants like the pancake-mammy Aunt Jemima and Rastus, the chef on the Cream of Wheat box." While African-American representation in the film industry has improved over the years, it has not been a linear process; "Race in American cinema has rarely been a matter of simple step-by-step progress. It has more often proceeded in fits and starts, with backlashes coming on the heels of breakthroughs, and periods of intense argument followed by uncomfortable silence."

== History ==
=== Old Hollywood ===
Due to the racial discrimination in the 19th and early 20th centuries, Hollywood tended to avoid using African-American actors and actresses. In pursuit of avoiding the use of African-American actors and actresses, blackface became a popular form of entertainment in the 19th century. Blackface let Hollywood use different characters without actually having to employ anyone with a darker skin tone. Al Jolson, an actor and singer, made blackface popular with characters such as Amos 'n' Andy and Jakie Rabinowitz. After 1930, the craze of blackface died out because of its connotations with bigotry and racism. Though roles tended to remain stereotypical, the 1930s would mark a dramatic shift in the representation of African American actors playing African American characters.

In 1951, when Amos 'n' Andy was brought to television, Clarence Muse "championed the popular comedy." He "self-published a pamphlet entitled 'The Dilemma of the Negro Actor.' In it, he made the incisive observation that African-American performers were caught in a trap. 'There are two audiences in America to confront,' he wrote, 'the white audience with a definite desire for buffoonery and song, and the Negro audience with a desire to see the real elements of Negro life portrayed.'" "Despite its demeaning caricatures, he argued, the program at least moved African-American performers to center stage.'"

Although African Americans were rarely employed in the film industry as actors and actresses, there were some films from Old Hollywood with a more progressive cast. The first film to have African-American representation was a recently discovered film from 1898 named Something Good – Negro Kiss, which is a short film depicting an African-American couple kissing and holding hands.

==== African-American roles in Old Hollywood ====
The roles that the African-American community were generally offered, usually fell into one or more of three themes; a tale of rags to riches, thug life, or segregation. These roles often followed old stereotypes. There was the Tom who was someone who served white people; the Coon who acted goofy (like a clown or naive); the "Tragic Mulatto" who was someone who tried to "pass for being white"; the Mammy who was seen as asexual, helped to raise the young, and helped families; and the Buck who was often a male who was hyper-sexualized and seen as a threat. Though the roles were demeaning for the communities with darker skin tones, some actors and actresses were so desperate to represent their communities or to change the ways of Hollywood they knew that any part is a part.

Performers such as Sidney Poitier and Hattie McDaniel would do whatever they would have to in order to pave the way for other African-American actors and actresses.The first black Oscar winner, Hattie McDaniel, received the Academy Award in 1940 for her portrayal of the loyal maid in Gone with the Wind. When criticized for often playing a mammy on film, McDaniel once stated, “I can be a maid for $7 a week. Or I can play a maid for $700 a week.” Despite the Academy Award, McDaniel faced struggle of both racism and sexism over the next decade, even within the National Association for the Advancement of Colored People (NAACP). Its leader, Walter Francis White, looked down on her and other actors (such as Stepin Fetchit) that he perceived to "playing the clown before the camera". By 1942, White and the NAACP had tried to force Hollywood into giving more opportunities for African Americans in film roles; McDaniel, on the other hand, believed that it should be her fellow black actors of the Screen Actors Guild, not the NAACP, responsible for the push.

=== New Hollywood ===
African-American actresses and actors are now more common on the big screen, but they are still scarce in bigger blockbuster movies. Reasons for this may be that "with the stakes high, many studio executives worry that films that focus on African-American themes risk being too narrow in their appeal to justify the investment. Hollywood has nonetheless shown an interest in recent years to bank more heavily on African-American actors and themes." “The consolidation of a black presence in the movies and television did not signal the arrival of a postracial Hollywood any more than the election of Barack Obama in 2008 spelled the end of America's 400-year-old racial drama.” A 2026 study of 2,023 top domestic-grossing U.S. films released from 1980 to 2022 found that Black actors' share of screentime was lower under tighter credit conditions and higher with GDP growth, while greater Black screentime was associated with weaker international and worldwide box-office performance but not weaker domestic performance.

While some people may still see the line between Hollywood's "new" and "old" attitude toward race, others truly believe that Hollywood has changed for the better. Directors such as Spike Lee and Tyler Perry, who cast all or mostly African-American actors in their films, have become household names, thus helping pave the way further for the rest of the African-American community. Though both directors have significantly different ways of portraying the African-American community, the popularity of both directors seems to signify to some that the racial tension in Hollywood has ended. Adding to the movement, Disney introduced the first African-American princess, Tiana, in 2009. People feel that "the color barrier is breaking down in Hollywood".

In 1988, during Eddie Murphy's presentation of the Best Picture category, Murphy gave an impromptu speech on how he felt that the Academy Awards were racist, stating that only three black people had won the award. Nineteen years later, he was nominated for Best Supporting Actor, but lost to Alan Arkin; one theory for his loss was his role in the reviled blockbuster Norbit. Others speculate that it is due to Murphy's comments from 1988.

The most famous film with an African-American lead in 2011 was The Help. In the Academy Awards ceremony the following year, the film was nominated in four categories: Best Supporting Actress (Octavia Spencer, along with Jessica Chastain), Best Actress (Viola Davis), and Best Picture. The movie walked away with one win for Best Supporting Actress, Octavia Spencer, leaving Viola Davis to lose to Meryl Streep, a 20-time nominee and three-time winner. Octavia Spencer was the only African American to win an award that night. "The troubling thing is that the only two black actors in this year's Oscar competition are cast as domestics, and would probably not have found meaty, starring roles in other films had they passed on The Help."

The 2014 Academy Awards were arguably a turning point for African-American films, with the film 12 Years a Slave taking home the Oscar for Best Picture. In 2013, five African-American films were released (12 Years a Slave, Fruitvale Station, Lee Daniels' The Butler, Best Man Holiday and Mandela: Long Walk to Freedom). The release of such films had a broader impact on the film industry with movie attendance by African Americans growing by thirteen percent compared to 2012.

In a 2016 article titled "How racially skewed are the Oscars?", The Economist had a look at the issue as of the 21st century and found that as far as actors are concerned, "...the number of black actors winning Oscars in this century has been pretty much in line with the size of America's overall black population. But this does not mean Hollywood has no problems of prejudice. As the data show, it clearly does." The article points to low African American membership numbers in the Academy of Motion Picture Arts and Sciences and under-representation at lower levels: "the whitewashing occurs not behind the closed doors of the Academy, but in drama schools (shown in the SAG membership) and casting offices". The article also highlights on a related problem: that while black actors may have gained more acknowledgment in the Oscars as of the 2000s, other minorities are still under-represented.

==== African-American roles in New Hollywood ====
Even in today's movies, the few roles that African-American performers are offered often fall under similar typecast roles to the roles offered in previous decades. Studio executives explain the lack of presence of African Americans in supporting or starring roles by stating that “only 4 out of 10 movies turn a profit, according to the Association of Motion Picture and Television Producers. But because pictures with nearly all-black casts come along more infrequently, they tend to stand out more when they fail".

== Racism in Hollywood ==
The perspectives, or perhaps lack thereof, throughout Hollywood of black representation can be linked back to colonialism and post-colonial perspectives within cinema. Colonialism and slave culture imposed an awareness of privilege and ascendency to “lesser breeds without the law”, to the point that a stigmatism of us-versus-them was prevalent in society. Ella Shohat and Robert Stam, in Unthinking Eurocentrism, explore ideas of racism and state that racism doesn't trek effortlessly and indifferently throughout time. They state that history references racism as “positional, relational and means that diverse groups have occupied the functional slot of the oppressed.” This continues to be the reality in Hollywood as “racism is above all a social relation – systematized hierarchization implacably pursued... anchored in material structures and embedded in historical configurations of power.” Shohat and Stam link the probable correlation between racism and its consequence of colonialism.

Another issue that Shohat and Stam address in their book is that “The sensitivity around stereotypes and distortions largely arises then, from the powerlessness of historically marginalised groups to control their own representation.” The absence of controlling the depiction of cultures, particularly people of colour, therefore, warrants need for more ethnic voices within Hollywood to speak on behalf of their culture. “Furthermore, in that the Hollywood system favours big-budget blockbusters, it is not only classist but also Eurocentric, in effect if not in explicit intention; to be a player in this game one needs to have economic power.”

Elements of film such as narrative structure, camera angles, and dialogue can portray racism as a core theme, especially within the proclamation of power and authority enlisted by white people. Its place within Hollywood cinema orchestrates its lack of awareness, especially when the Hollywood film industry is continuously dominated by figures of immense control that are usually white as suggested above. In Richard Dyer's White: Essays on Race and Culture, he states that “research repeatedly shows that in western representation white overwhelmingly and disproportionately predominant, have the central and elaborated roles, and above all are placed as the norm, the ordinary, the standard.” This representation has become a norm in regards to Hollywood films, which in turn has created problematic issues creating narrative ideas of representation of race in ideologies, stereotypes, racism, oppression, and representation. Dyer also states that “race is not only attributable to people who are not white, nor is the imagery of non-white people the only racial imagery.”

== Effect on viewers ==
The representation of African American actors and actresses affects the audience of these films. “National self-consciousness, generally seen as a precondition for nationhood – that is, the shared belief of desperate individuals that they share common origins, status, location, and aspirations – became broadly linked to cinematic fictions.”

"Many researchers argue that media portrayals of minorities tend to reflect whites' attitudes toward minorities and, therefore, reveal more about whites themselves than about the varied and lived experiences of minorities". Producing films in this way is what leads to a singular perspective and opinion to dominate mainstream media.

== African American Academy Award winners ==
Since the first awards ceremony in 1929 and after more than 3,000 awards given, 43 African Americans have won Oscars:

- 20th century Academy Award winners
  - Hattie McDaniel (1939)
  - Sidney Poitier (1963)
  - Isaac Hayes (1971)
  - Louis Gossett Jr. (1982)
  - Irene Cara (1983)
  - Prince (1984)
  - Stevie Wonder (1984)
  - Lionel Richie (1985)
  - Herbie Hancock (1986)
  - Willie D. Burton (1988 and 2006)
  - Denzel Washington (1989 and 2001)
  - Russell Williams (1989 and 1990)
  - Whoopi Goldberg (1990)
  - Cuba Gooding Jr. (1996)
- 21st century Academy Award winners
  - Halle Berry (2001)
  - Jamie Foxx (2004)
  - Morgan Freeman (2004)
  - Frayser Boy/Juicy J/DJ Paul (2005)
  - Forest Whitaker (2006)
  - Jennifer Hudson (2006)
  - Geoffrey Fletcher (2009)
  - Mo'Nique (2009)
  - Roger Ross Williams (2009)
  - Octavia Spencer (2011)
  - T. J. Martin (2012)
  - Octavia Spencer (2012)
  - John Ridley (2013)
  - Lupita Nyong'o (2013)
  - Steve McQueen (2013)
  - Common/John Legend (2014)
  - Barry Jenkins/Tarell Alvin McCraney (2016)
  - Ezra Edelman (2016)
  - Mahershala Ali (2016 and 2019)
  - Viola Davis (2016)
  - Jordan Peele (2017)
  - Kobe Bryant (2017)
  - Kevin Willmott/Spike Lee (2018)
  - Hannah Beachler (2018)
  - Peter Ramsey (2018)
  - Regina King (2018)
  - Ruth E. Carter (2018 and 2022)
  - Matthew A. Cherry/Karen Rupert Toliver (2019)
  - Will Smith (2022)
  - Angela Bassett (Honor award, 2024)
  - Michael B. Jordan (2026)

== See also ==
- African American cinema
- Academy Aperture 2025
- Magical Negro
- Portrayal of black people in comics
- Race film
- Representation of African Americans in media
