= Camp Lo =

American hip hop group

- Origin: The Bronx, New York City, U.S.
- Genre: Hip hop
- Years active: 1995–present
- Labels: Soul Fever; Profile; Arista; BMG; SRC; Universal
- Members: Geechi Suede; Sonny Cheeba
- Website: officialcamplo.com

Camp Lo is an American hip hop duo from The Bronx, New York, formed in 1995 and consisting of rappers Sonny Cheeba (Salahadeen Wilds) and Geechi Suede (Saladine Wallace). The duo is perhaps best known for their 1997 hit "Luchini AKA This Is It".

== Career ==
Initially signed with Profile Records, Camp Lo made their first appearance in 1996 on The Great White Hype soundtrack, with their single "Coolie High". The smooth party song was a minor hit, peaking at No. 25 on the Billboard Hot Rap Singles chart. Their first major exposure came with the release of their second single, the upbeat, horn-driven "Luchini", otherwise known as "This Is It". The song became a crossover hit in 1997, breaking into the Top 50 on the Billboard Hot 100, and reaching the top 5 on the Hot Rap Singles chart. The track peaked at No. 74 in the UK Singles Chart in August 1997. The duo released their debut album Uptown Saturday Night in January 1997. The effort was widely acclaimed, praised for its accessible content and smooth, funk- and jazz-inspired production.

The majority of the album was produced by Ski, famous for his work with Jay-Z. Guest appearances were provided by De La Soul's Trugoy and Digable Planets' Butterfly. The album's 1970s-styled content was influential on a number of artists within the next few years after its release, like Will Smith, who enlisted Camp Lo for an appearance on his top-selling Big Willie Style album. Also in 1997, they appeared on Oran "Juice" Jones' single "Poppin' That Fly". They collaborated with De La Soul in 2000, on the song "So Good" from the Hip Hop 101 Compilation. They finally returned with another album in 2002, titled Let's Do It Again. This effort was not nearly as well-received as their debut, and was met with mediocre reviews and sales. Shortly after the album's release, Aesop Rock enlisted the duo to appear on his album Bazooka Tooth, exposing them to fans of the underground Definitive Jux label. In 2007, the duo returned with Black Hollywood after a five-year hiatus from their previous release.

In April 2008, Camp Lo signed with SRC/Universal Records and changed its name to the Lo, on the recommendation from DJ Mr. Cee. The duo released a new single titled "Lumdi", produced by Korleon. They also confirmed a 2011 release for a new collaboration album with Pete Rock, as they form their new group '80 Blocks From Tiffanys'.

In 2012, Geechi Suede collaborated with TheeKIDICARUS on a song "Ask About Me" where TheeKIDICARUS would produce the track.

In 2013, Geechi Suede was featured on the song "21st Century" from #TheRevival, a compilation album by Philly-based rappers/producers Franz Kafka and The TradeMark Experience.

In May 2015, Camp Lo released a song titled "Black Jesus" via 2DOPEBOYZ in anticipation for their 5th album titled Ragtime Hightimes. On May 18, 2015, Camp Lo released their album Ragtime Hightimes.

In 2016, Sonny Cheeba featured on The Avalanches' song "Because I'm Me" on the album Wildflower.

On September 22, 2017, Camp Lo released the first of three A Piece of the Action albums series, leading up to their sixth album titled The Get Down Brothers.

== Discography ==
=== Albums ===
Uptown Saturday Night
- Released: January 28, 1997
- Billboard 200 chart position: No. 27
- R&B/Hip-Hop chart position: No. 5
- Singles: "Coolie High"/"Killin' Em Softly", "Luchini AKA This is It"/"Swing",
  "Black Nostaljack AKA Come On"

Let's Do It Again
- Released: May 21, 2002
- Billboard 200 chart position: -
- R&B/Hip-Hop chart position: No. 64
- Singles: "Glow"/"Gorilla Pimp", "How U Walkin'"

Black Hollywood
- Released: July 24, 2007
- Billboard 200 chart position:
- R&B/Hip-Hop chart position:
- Singles: "Black Hollywood"/"Soul Fever"

Stone and Rob: Caught On Tape
- Released: March 24, 2009
- Billboard 200 chart position: -
- R&B/Hip-Hop chart position:
- Label: Soul Fever/SRC/Universal
- Producers: Apple Juice Kid, Jocko, Smoking Apples, AJ Strong, Rob Chaseman
- Singles: "On Smash" (feat. Styles P and Pete Rock)

Another Heist
- Released: October 20, 2009
- Billboard 200 chart position: -
- R&B/Hip-Hop chart position:
- Singles: "Another Heist", "Son Of A..."

80 Blocks from Tiffany's (with Pete Rock)
- Released: Summer 2011
- Billboard 200 chart position: -
- R&B/Hip-Hop chart position:
- Singles: "Mic Check"

Ragtime Hightimes
- Released: May 19, 2015
- Billboard 200 chart position: -
- R&B/Hip-Hop chart position:
- Singles: "Cold Retarded"

On the Way Uptown (The Uptown Saturday Night Demo)
- Released: December 23, 2016
- Billboard 200 chart position: -
- R&B/Hip-Hop chart position:
- Singles:

80 Blocks From Tiffany's 2 (with Pete Rock)
- Released: July 30, 2013 (original release), May 22, 2020 (reissue)
- Billboard 200 chart position: -
- R&B/Hip-Hop chart position:
- Singles:

Pinky Ring Espresso (with DJ DOOWOP)
- Released: October 7, 2021
- Billboard 200 chart position: -
- R&B/Hip-Hop chart position: -
- Singles:

=== Guest appearances ===
- 1996: "Coolie High" - The Great White Hype (soundtrack)
- 1997: Everything You Want (Roc-A-Blok Remix) - {Ray J} 12"
- 1997: "Poppin' That Fly... (DJ Clark Kent Remix)" - {Oran "Juice" Jones, Stu Large} Nothin' 2 Lose (Soundtrack)
- 1997: "Disco T-E-C" - {DJ Honda} HII
- 1997: "Yes Yes Y'all" - {Will Smith} Big Willie Style
- 1998: "Freestyle" - {Kid Capri} Soundtrack to the Streets
- 1999: "Flossy Gramma" - {Brixx} Everything Happens for a Reason
- 2000: "So Good" - {De La Soul} Architects of Culture
- 2003: "Limelighters" - {Aesop Rock} Bazooka Tooth
- 2007: "The Milky Lowa" - {9th Wonder} The Dream Merchant Vol. 2
- 2007: "Gutterfly" - {Lifesavaz} Gutterfly
- 2008: "Snob Hop" - {Kidz in the Hall} The In Crowd
- 2010: "Imported Nights" - {Cradle Orchestra} Transcended Elements}
- 2010: "Back Uptown" - {Ski Beatz} 24 Hour Karate School
- 2012: "Plush Up (Akinobu Remix)" - {Akinobu} Perfect World
- 2014: "Love" - {Ed O.G.} After All These Years
- 2016: "Because I'm Me" - {The Avalanches} Wildflower
- 2017: "True Lies" - {M-Dot, Tribeca} Ego and the Enemy
- 2017: "Warrior /Sankofa" - {Ill Camille} Heirloom
- 2018: "The Poetic Purge" - {The Architect Presents} Masterpiece Theater
- 2024: "Cheeba" - {Da Beatminerz, Stahhr} Stifled Creativity
- 2025: "Weed, sex and Cars" - {Diamond D} The Diam Piece 3

=== Chart singles ===
Year	Single	Peak chart positions			
Year	Single	U.S. Billboard Hot 100	U.S. Hot Dance Music/Maxi-Singles Sales	U.S. Hot R&B/Hip-Hop Singles & Tracks	U.S. Hot Rap Singles
1995	"Coolie High"	—	—	62	25
1997	"Luchini AKA This Is It"	50	8	21	5
1997	"Black Nostaljack AKA Come On"	—	24	—	—
