= African Americans in film =

African-Americans in film refers to the history, contributions, and representation of African-Americans in the film industry. This article covers the evolution of African-American roles in film, including notable filmmakers, actors, and films, as well as the challenges and achievements of African-Americans in the industry.

== History ==
=== Early cinema ===
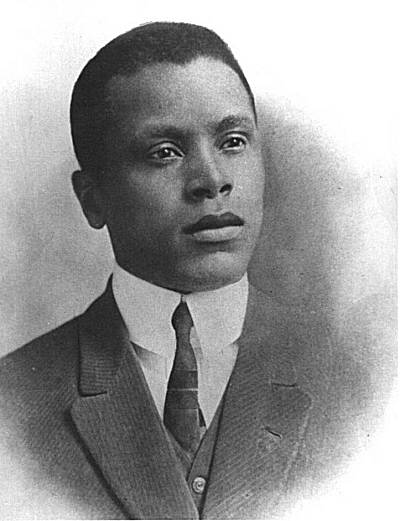
Oscar Micheaux

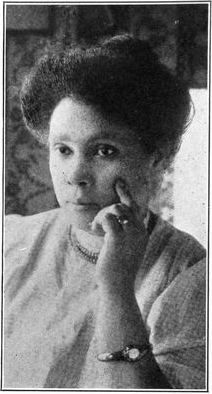
Maria P. Williams

In the early days of cinema, African-American roles were scarce and often filled with stereotypes. Pioneers like Oscar Micheaux, one of the first significant African-American filmmakers, countered these narratives with films like The Homesteader (1919) and Body and Soul (1925), which were part of the "race film" genre and tackled issues such as racial violence, economic oppression, and discrimination Other pioneers included Maria P. Williams, the first black female film producer, known for her 1923 film Flames of Wrath, and Noble Johnson, who founded the Lincoln Motion Picture Company in 1916 to produce positive films starring black actors. Spencer Williams, another prolific filmmaker, directed films like The Blood of Jesus (1941), which portrayed Southern Baptist religion through a black lens. These filmmakers' contributions were pivotal in challenging and changing the stereotypical and discriminatory portrayal of African-Americans in early cinema.

African American characters were often portrayed as incompetent, child-like, hypersexual, and criminal.

=== The Civil Rights Era ===
The Civil Rights Movement profoundly impacted African-American representation in film, marking a shift from stereotypes to more varied and complex characters. During this era, "race films" began to combat the negative racist stereotypes prevalent since the early 1900s. A significant breakthrough came with Nothing But a Man (1963), a drama featuring an all-Black cast aimed at a mixed audience, released as the Civil Rights Movement was gaining momentum.

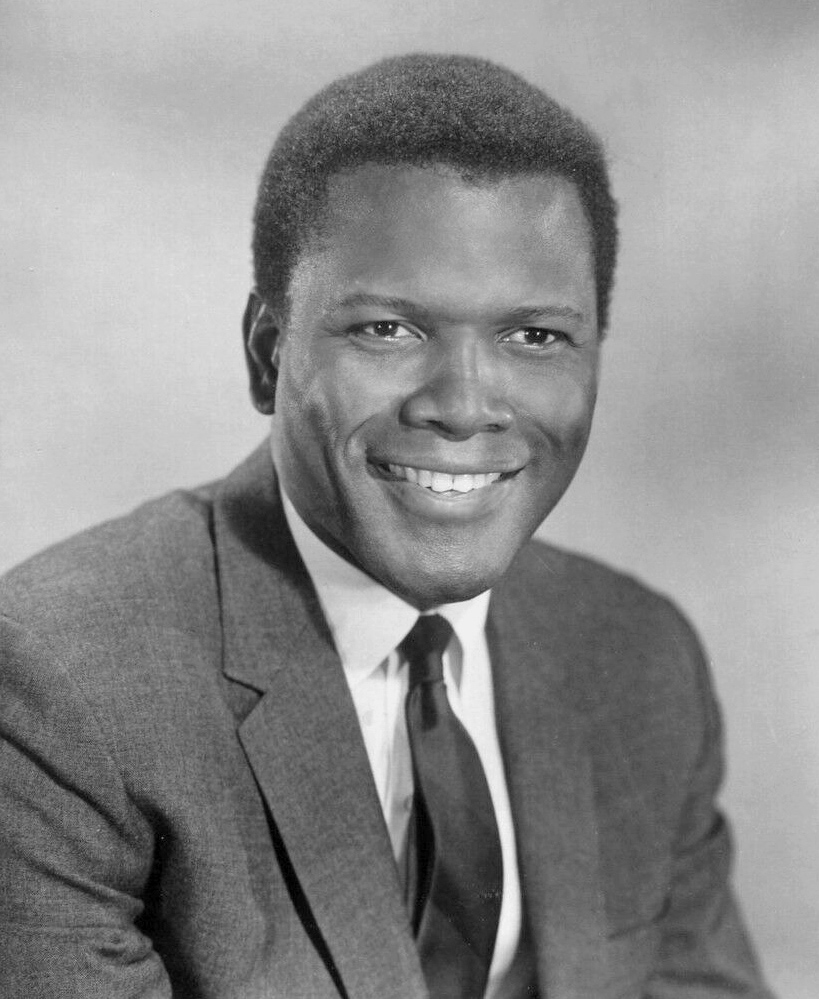
Oscar winner Sidney Poitier broke barriers with the first interracial kiss in an American film in 1967.

Sidney Poitier, a prominent figure of this era, broke barriers with his Oscar-winning performance in Lilies of the Field (1963), becoming the first Black man to win an Oscar. He also starred in Guess Who's Coming to Dinner (1967), which portrayed an interracial marriage positively and was released six months after interracial marriage was legalized throughout the United States.

Another milestone was The Learning Tree (1969), directed by Gordon Parks, which marked the first Hollywood studio film directed by an African-American. Adapted from Parks' semi-autobiographical novel, the film depicted a Black teenager's coming-of-age in Kansas during the 1920s. The Learning Tree addressed racial and societal challenges with an authenticity rarely seen in mainstream cinema at the time, paving the way for African-American directors to take on leadership roles in Hollywood.

In 1971, Sweet Sweetback's Baadasssss Song, written, directed, and produced by Melvin Van Peebles, further revolutionized African-American cinema. The film was a defining moment for the blaxploitation genre, featuring a defiant narrative centered on a Black protagonist resisting systemic oppression. Funded independently and supported by the Black Panther Party, the film's success demonstrated the potential for Black filmmakers to achieve commercial and critical acclaim outside the Hollywood system. Its cultural impact extended beyond its storyline, inspiring a new generation of African-American filmmakers to explore bold and unapologetic themes.

This era marked the beginning of a transformative period in Hollywood, with Black creatives working tirelessly to combat harmful stereotypes and create a more inclusive and varied representation of the Black experience in film. Together, these films symbolized the growing empowerment of African-American filmmakers and audiences during a time of social upheaval, showcasing authentic narratives that challenged the status quo and demanded change in Hollywood's treatment of race.

=== Contemporary era ===
Significant achievements and diverse storytelling have marked the contemporary era in African-American cinema. Films such as Moonlight (2016) and Black Panther (2018) have received critical recognition, with Black Panther also achieving substantial box-office success. Moonlight, an exploration of a young African-American man's journey, was the first LGBTQ+ film with an all-Black cast to win the Academy Award for Best Picture. This landmark victory highlighted the evolving recognition of diverse narratives within the African-American community.

Black Panther was a massive box office success.

Black Panther, the first Black Marvel superhero film, achieved box office success and significantly impacted cultural representation. The film's portrayal of African heritage and its strong, nuanced characters marked a departure from stereotypical roles and opened new avenues for representation in mainstream media. These films, along with other notable works in this era, have challenged traditional norms, paving the way for a more inclusive and representative cinematic landscape.

== Representation ==
The portrayal of African Americans in film has evolved into more nuanced representations, reflecting the varied experiences within the African-American community. Films have historically used Black narratives to challenge stereotypes and tell diverse stories, from the early "race movies" combatting Jim Crow stereotypes to the blaxploitation films of the post-civil rights era. Despite Hollywood's historical tendency to caricature the Black experience, recent years have seen a shift toward a more authentic and varied portrayal of African-American lives.

This change is partly attributed to the increasing presence of Black actors and themes in mainstream cinema, although their representation in blockbuster movies remains limited. Studio executives have traditionally perceived films focusing on African-American themes as having a narrow appeal, impacting the investment in such movies. A 2026 study of 2,023 top domestic-grossing U.S. films released between 1980 and 2022 found that Black actors' share of screentime was lower when credit conditions tightened and higher when GDP grew; greater Black screentime was also associated with higher domestic gross but lower international revenue share and worldwide gross. However, the growing popularity of directors like Spike Lee and Tyler Perry, who predominantly cast African-American actors, signifies a positive shift in Hollywood's approach to race. The introduction of the first African American Disney princess, Tiana, in 2009 also marks a significant step towards breaking the color barrier in Hollywood.

While progress has been made, the journey towards post-racial Hollywood is ongoing, with the industry continuing to grapple with its long-standing racial issues. The increasing acknowledgment and success of films with African-American leads and themes reflect a growing recognition of the importance of diverse representation in cinema.

== Notable figures ==
=== Actors ===
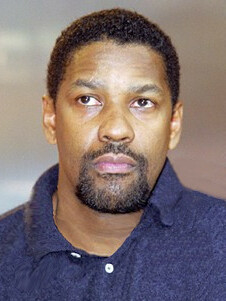
Denzel Washington

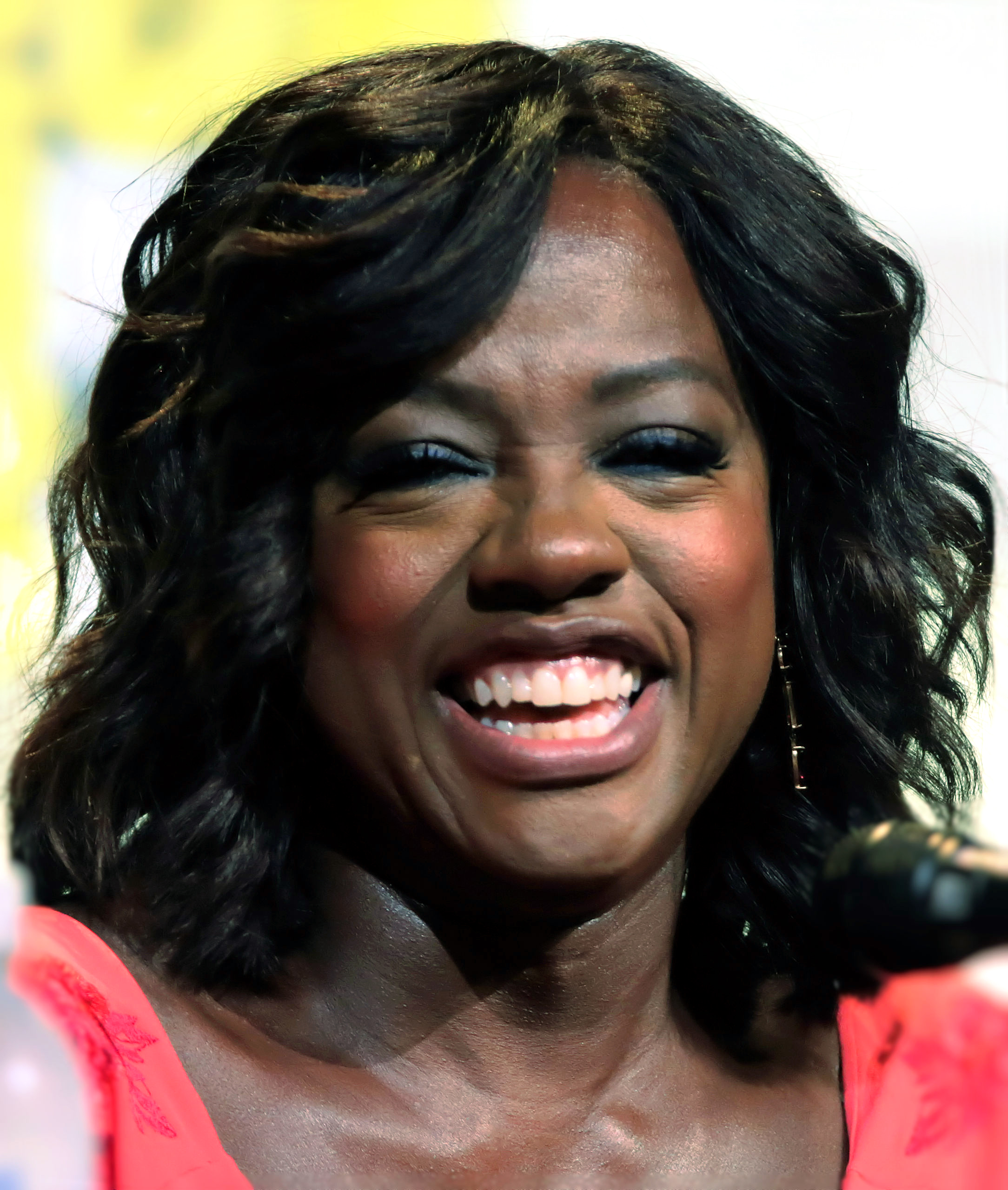
Viola Davis

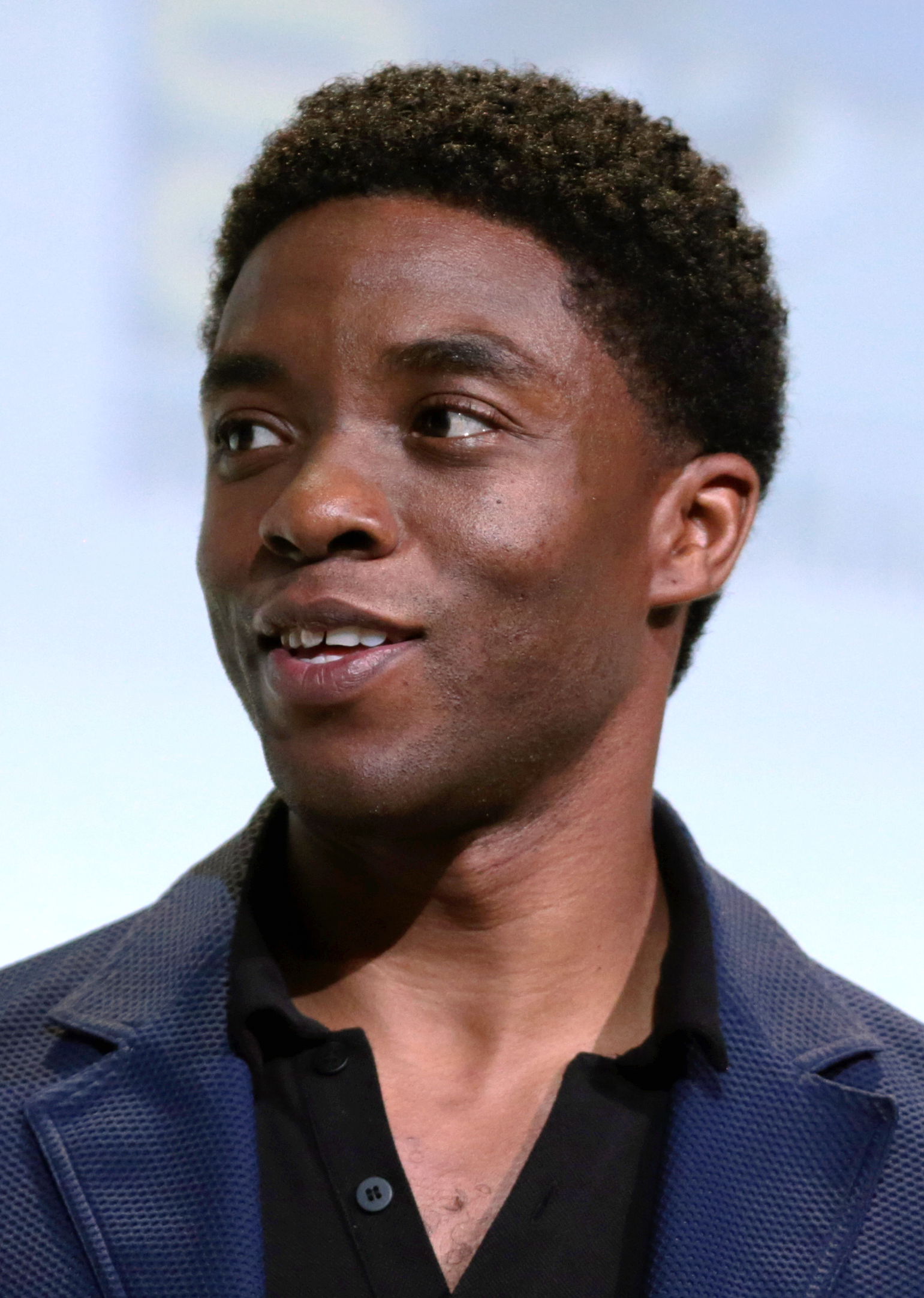
Chadwick Boseman

Denzel Washington: Known for Training Day (2001) and Malcolm X (1992). Washington is celebrated for his powerful performances that often delve into complex characters and narratives, establishing him as one of the most respected actors in Hollywood.

Viola Davis: Acclaimed for her performance in Fences (2016), Davis is the first African-American to achieve the "Triple Crown of Acting," winning an Academy Award, an Emmy Award, and a Tony Award.

Chadwick Boseman: Celebrated for his role in Black Panther (2018), Boseman portrayed iconic figures in African-American history, such as Jackie Robinson in 42 (2013) and James Brown in Get on Up (2014). His portrayal of King T’Challa in Black Panther became a cultural phenomenon, representing strength and pride in African heritage.

Halle Berry: The first Black woman to win the Academy Award for Best Actress, for her performance in Monster's Ball (2001), Berry has played significant roles in films like Die Another Day (2002) and X-Men (2000).

Sidney Poitier: A trailblazer for African-American actors, Poitier was the first Black man to win an Academy Award for Best Actor for his role in Lilies of the Field (1963). He was instrumental in breaking racial barriers in Hollywood and starred in groundbreaking films such as In the Heat of the Night (1967) and Guess Who's Coming to Dinner (1967).

=== Directors ===
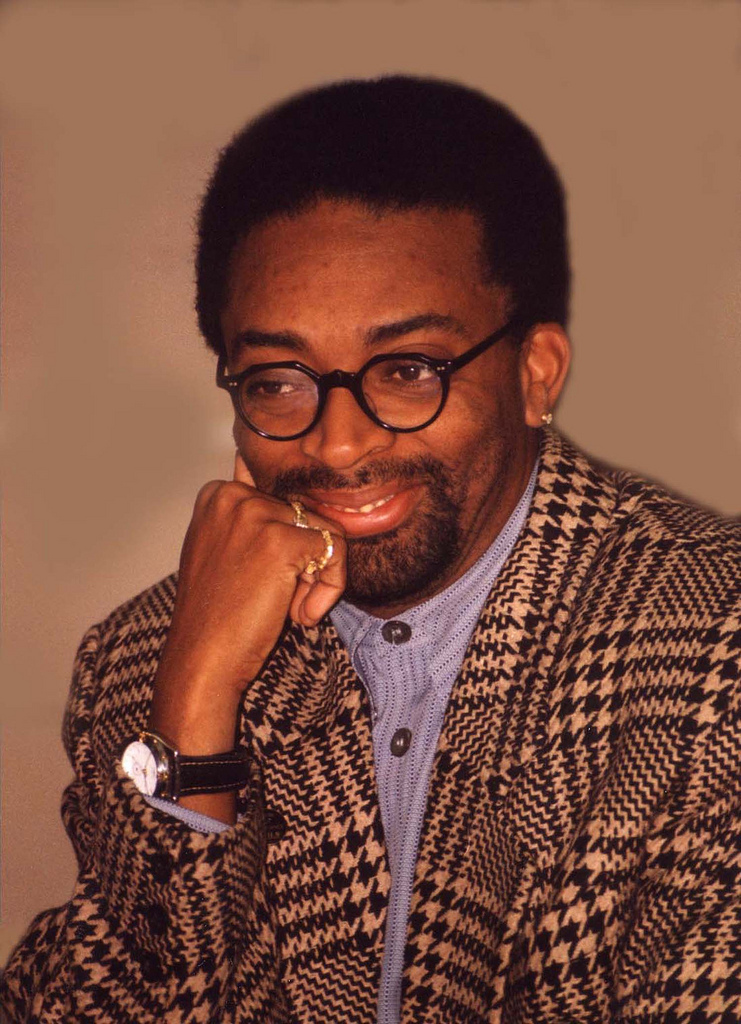
Spike Lee

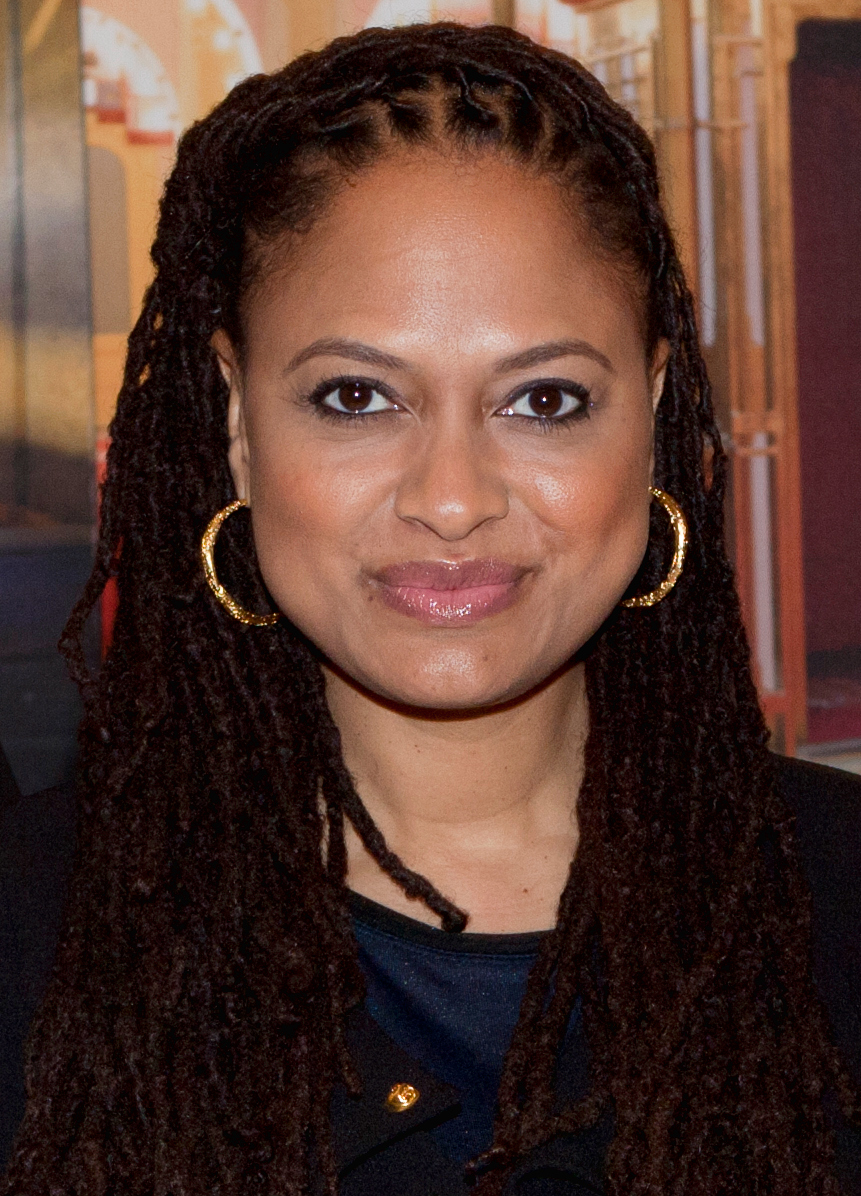
Ava DuVernay

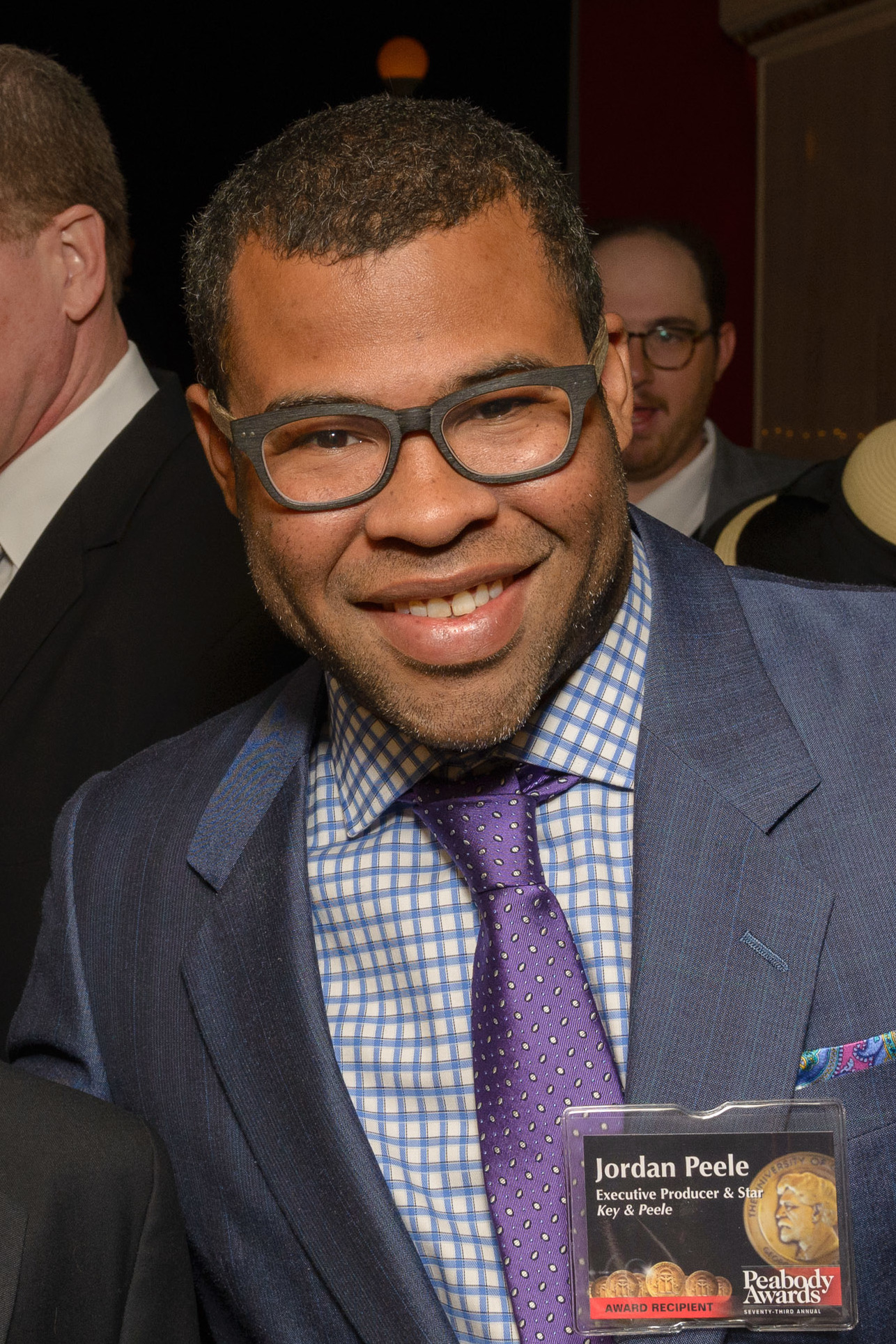
Jordan Peele

Spike Lee: Known for Do the Right Thing (1989), Lee has addressed complex issues of race, identity, and social justice in films such as Malcolm X (1992) and BlacKkKlansman (2018). His innovative storytelling has earned him critical acclaim and a prominent place in cinema history.

Ava DuVernay: Director of Selma (2014), DuVernay is the first African-American woman to direct a film nominated for the Academy Award for Best Picture. She has also produced impactful projects such as 13th (2016), a documentary exploring mass incarceration and systemic racism.

Jordan Peele: Renowned for Get Out (2017), Peele revolutionized the horror genre by integrating themes of race and social commentary. His other works, including Us (2019) and Nope (2022), have further cemented his reputation as a visionary filmmaker.

Barry Jenkins: Known for Moonlight (2016), which won the Academy Award for Best Picture, Jenkins explores themes of identity, family, and community in his work. His other acclaimed film, If Beale Street Could Talk (2018), further showcased his talent for poetic and emotionally resonant storytelling.

=== Producers ===
Oprah Winfrey: Produced several significant films, including The Color Purple (1985) and Selma (2014). Winfrey has used her platform to amplify African-American narratives and is recognized as a trailblazer in Hollywood.

Tyler Perry: Known for creating a self-sustaining production model, Perry's works, such as the Madea series, highlight African-American experiences with humor and heart. He is the first African-American to own a major film studio.

== Influence and impact ==
African-American cinema has profoundly shaped American cultural narratives, with films like Spike Lee's Do the Right Thing sparking national conversations on race relations and Hidden Figures highlighting the stories of African-American women. The industry has seen a shift towards diverse storytelling, exemplified by the success of Black Panther. Films like Moonlight have not only illuminated the African-American LGBTQ+ experience but also signaled a shift in industry recognition with its Academy Award achievements. These developments have inspired a new generation of filmmakers and resonated globally, demonstrating the universal appeal and significance of African-American narratives.

== Challenges ==
Despite progress, African-American filmmakers face significant challenges, including systemic barriers in funding, distribution, and recognition within a predominantly white industry. Ongoing issues of stereotyping and typecasting restrict the range of roles available to African-American actors, often confining them to limited portrayals. Critical reception may also present challenges for films with greater Black representation. A 2025 study found that critic ratings tended to become less favorable as the proportion of Black cast members increased, although this relationship was substantially weaker among Black critics. The study also found that critic ratings became less aligned with audience ratings and box-office outcomes for films with greater Black cast representation. Additionally, the underrepresentation of African Americans in key roles behind the camera, such as directors and producers, limits the diversity of stories and perspectives in Hollywood. Economic challenges, like lower budgets and marketing resources for films with predominantly African-American themes, further impact their commercial success. Nevertheless, the industry has witnessed initiatives aimed at increasing diversity and inclusivity, advocating for policy changes and improved representation in all filmmaking areas.

== See also ==
- History of film
- Cinema of the United States
