= Doug E. Fresh discography =

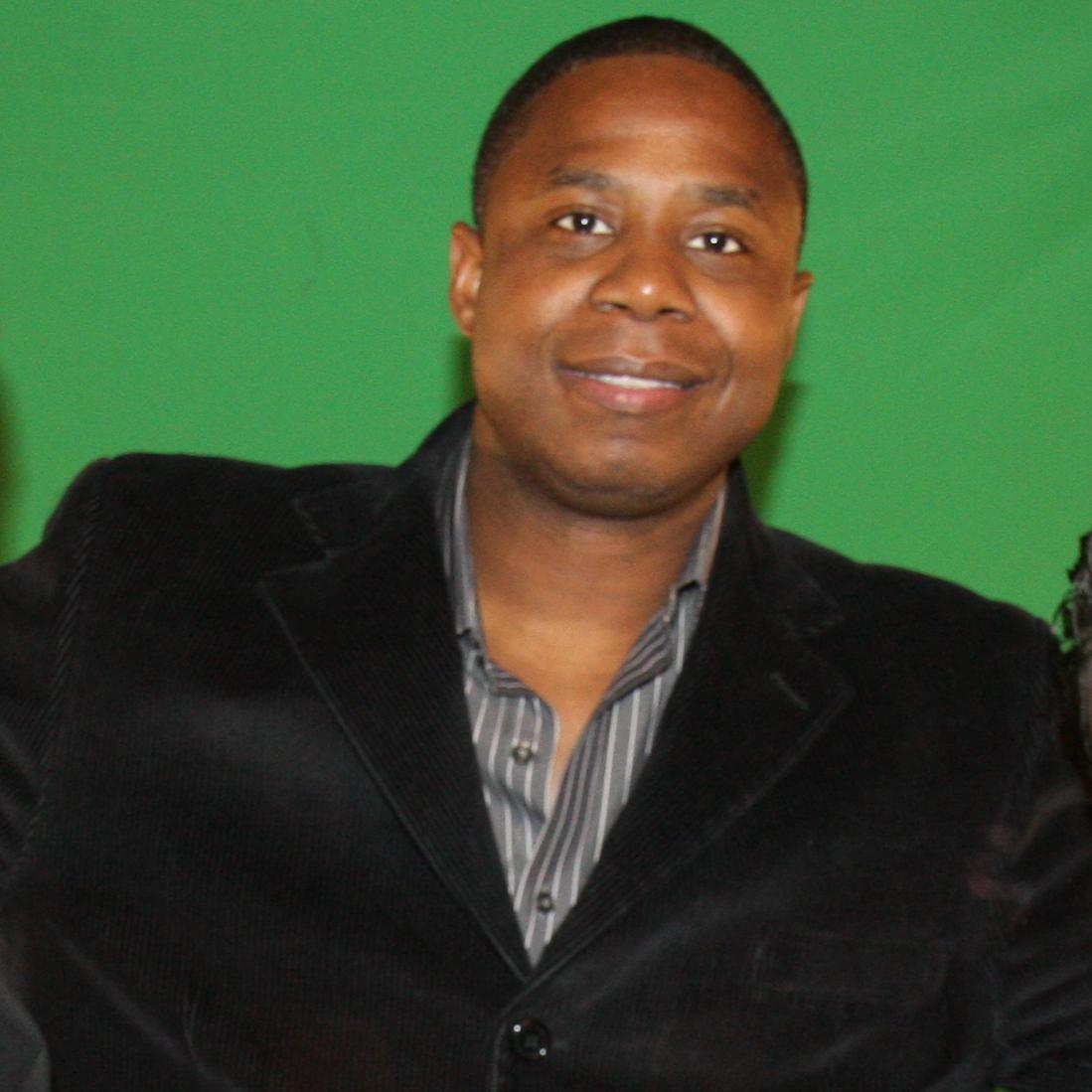
- Doug E. Fresh at the 5th Annual Hip-Hop Summit Action Network's Action Awards.
- Studio albums: 5
- EPs: 2
- Compilation albums: 1
- Singles: 39
- Music videos: 42
- Promotional singles: 11
- Live albums: 2

The following is the discography of Doug E. Fresh, an American rapper.

== Albums ==
=== Studio albums ===
List of albums, with selected chart positions
Title	Album details	Peak chart positions
Title	Album details	US R&B /HH
Play	Released: September 26, 1995; Label: Gee Street; Formats: CD, LP, cassette, digital download, streaming	81

=== Collaborative albums ===
List of collaborative albums, with selected chart positions
Title	Album details	Peak chart positions	
Title	Album details	US	US R&B /HH
Oh, My God! (with The Get Fresh Crew)	Released: July 7, 1986; Label: Reality/Fantasy; Formats: LP, cassette, digital download, streaming	—	21
The World's Greatest Entertainer (with The Get Fresh Crew)	Released: May 31, 1988; Label: Reality/Fantasy; Formats: CD, LP, cassette, digital download, streaming	88	7
Doin' What I Gotta Do (with The New Get Fresh Crew)	Released: April 27, 1992; Label: Bust It/Capitol; Formats: CD, cassette, digital download	—	47
"—" denotes a recording that did not chart or was not released in that territory.

=== Live albums ===
List of live albums
Title	Album details
Live At Club U, V2 (with The Get Fresh Crew and Pure Essence)	Released: 2003; Label: Rare One; Formats: LP
This One's for Chuck Brown: Doug E. Fresh Salutes the Godfather of Go-Go	Released: September 24, 2021; Label: Get Fresh Crew; Formats: digital download, streaming

=== Compilation albums ===
List of compilation albums
Title	Album details
The Greatest Hits	Released: April 27, 2011; Label: JTC Atlantic Partners; Formats: CD, streaming

== Singles ==
=== As lead artist ===
List of singles, with selected chart positions and certifications, showing year released and album name
Title	Year	Peak chart positions				Certifications	Album
Title	Year	US R&B	US Rap	NLD	UK	Certifications	Album
"Just Having Fun" (with DJ Chill Will & DJ Barry Bee) (Note: "Published as "Dougy Fresh".)	1984	—	*	—	—		Street Sounds Electro 6
"The Original Human Beat Box" (Note: "Published as "Dougé Fresh".)	1984	—	*	—	—		Street Sounds Electro 6
"The Show" (with The Get Fresh Crew)	1985	4	*	13	7	RIAA: Gold; BPI: Silver	Oh, My God!
"Just Having Fun" (re-release)	1985	—	*	—	98		Street Sounds Electro 6
"All the Way to Heaven" (with The Get Fresh Crew)	1986	19	*	—	79		Oh, My God!
"Lovin' Ev'ry Minute of It" (with The Get Fresh Crew)	1986	38	*	—	—		Oh, My God!
"Play This Only at Night" (with The Get Fresh Crew)	1987	56	*	—	—		Oh, My God!
"Keep Risin' to the Top" (with The Get Fresh Crew)	1988	4	*	—	—		The World's Greatest Entertainer
"Cut That Zero" (with The Get Fresh Crew)	1988	66	*	—	—		The World's Greatest Entertainer
"D.E.F. = Doug E. Fresh" (with The Get Fresh Crew)	1989	—	15	—	—		The World's Greatest Entertainer
"Spirit" (with The Get Fresh Crew)	1989	—	—	—	—		Ghostbusters II Soundtrack
"Summertime" (with The Get Fresh Crew)	1989	55	27	—	—		Non-album single
"Bustin' Out (On Funk)" (with The New Get Fresh Crew)	1992	28	15	—	—		Doin' What I Gotta Do
"If I Was Your Man" (with The New Get Fresh Crew)	1992	79	—	—	—		Doin' What I Gotta Do
"I-Ight (Alright)"	1993	73	27	—	—		Play
"It's On!" (featuring Vicious)	1995	—	—	—	—		Play
"Hands in the Air" (featuring Beenie Man)	1995	—	47	—	—		Play
"Think Again"	2002	—	—	—	—		Non-album singles
"Left-Right" (featuring Square Off)	2007	—	—	—	—		Non-album singles
"Lets Get It"	2011	—	—	—	—		The Struggle
"Everybody" (with Jordin Sparks, Ryan Beatty, Artie Green, Dr. Oz & Hip Hop Doc)	2013	—	—	—	—		Songs for a Healthier America
"Celebrate" (featuring Avery Lynch)	2018	—	—	—	—		Non-album singles
"Buss It Down" (with George Adams & Lil' Vicious)	2019	—	—	—	—		Non-album singles
"20 Seconds or More" (with Artie Green & Gerry Gunn)	2020	—	—	—	—		This One's For Chuck Brown: Doug E. Fresh Salutes the Godfather of Go-Go
"10X" (with Stacy Francis & WD-HAN)	2023	—	—	—	—		Non-album single
"La Di Da Di" (with M. C. Ricky D)	2025	—	—	—	—		Originally a non-album release (Note: "La Di Da Di" was later added to Oh, My God! reissues.)
"—" denotes a recording that did not chart or was not released in that territory. "*" indicates a chart that did not exist at the time.

doug-e-fresh

=== As featured artist ===
List of singles as featured artist, with selected chart positions and certifications, showing year released and album name
Title	Year	Peak chart positions										Certifications	Album
Title	Year	US	US Dance	US R&B	US Rap	AUS	NLD	NZ	SWE	UK	UK R&B	Certifications	Album
"Pass the Boo-Dah" (as part of Boo-Dah Bliss Crew)	1983	—	—	—	*	—	—	—	—	—	—		Non-album singles
"Get Fresh - Get Fresh (Break Dance)" (as part of P.C. Crew)	1983	—	—	—	*	—	—	—	—	—	—		Non-album singles
"Dougee Fresh vs. The Beat Box" (as part of P.C. Crew)	1985	—	—	—	*	—	—	—	—	—	—		Non-album singles
"Self Destruction" (as part of Stop the Violence Movement)	1989	—	— (Note: "Self Destruction" did not enter the Dance Club Songs, but peaked at number 7 on the Dance/Electronic Singles Sales.)	30	1	—	—	33	—	75	—	RIAA: Gold	Non-album singles
"Mr. D.J." (Joyce Fenderella Irby featuring Doug E. Fresh)	1989	—	23	2	—	—	40	—	—	95	—		Maximum Thrust
"Life of a Shortie" (Li'l Vicious featuring Doug E. Fresh and Shyheim)	1994	—	—	—	—	—	—	—	—	—	—		Destination Brooklyn
"Sittin' in My Car" (Slick Rick featuring Doug E. Fresh)	1995	— (Note: "Sittin' in My Car" did not enter the Billboard Hot 100, but peaked at number 1 on the Bubbling Under Hot 100.)	— (Note: "Sittin' in My Car" did not enter the Dance Club Songs, but peaked at number 18 on the Dance/Electronic Singles Sales.)	56	11	—	—	—	—	—	—		Behind Bars
"1, 2 Pass It" (as part of D&D All-Stars)	1995	— (Note: "1, 2 Pass It" did not enter the Billboard Hot 100, but peaked at number 8 on the Bubbling Under Hot 100.)	— (Note: "1, 2 Pass It" did not enter the Dance Club Songs, but peaked at number 7 on the Dance/Electronic Singles Sales.)	66	11	—	—	—	—	—	—		The D&D Project
"Let Me Clear My Throat" (DJ Kool featuring Doug E. Fresh & Biz Markie)	1996	30	— (Note: "Let Me Clear My Throat" did not enter the Dance Club Songs, but peaked at number 2 on the Dance/Electronic Singles Sales.)	21	4	50	7	19	46	8	2	RIAA: Platinum	Let Me Clear My Throat
"Nutty Buddy" (Little Wicked featuring Doug E. Fresh)	1996	—	—	—	—	—	—	—	—	—	—		Strictly the Best Vol. 17
"We Turn It" (Slick Rick featuring Doug E. Fresh)	1999	—	—	—	—	—	—	—	—	—	—		The Art of Storytelling
"Mille Promesse (1000 Promises)" (Claudio Risi & The Operas featuring Doug E. Fresh)	2000	—	—	—	—	—	—	—	—	—	—		Non-album single
"Lovey Dovey" (DMC featuring Doug E. Fresh)	2006	—	—	—	—	—	—	—	—	—	—		Checks Thugs and Rock n Roll
"Living on a Dream" (Mereba featuring Doug E. Fresh)	2017	—	—	—	—	—	—	—	—	—	—		Kotton House, Vol. 1
"—" denotes a recording that did not chart or was not released in that territory. "*" indicates a chart that did not exist at the time.

=== Promotional singles ===
List of singles, showing year released and album name
Title	Year	Peak chart positions			Album
Title	Year	US Bub.	US R&B	US Rap	Album
"She Was the Type of Girl" (with The Get Fresh Crew)	1986	—	—	—	Oh, My God!
"Nuthin'" (with The Get Fresh Crew)	1986	—	—	—	Oh, My God!
"Ev'ry Body Got 2 Get Some" (with The Get Fresh Crew)	1988	—	—	—	The World's Greatest Entertainer
"On the Strength'" (with The Get Fresh Crew)	1988	—	—	—	The World's Greatest Entertainer
"I'm Gettin’ Ready" (with The Get Fresh Crew)	1988	—	—	—	The World's Greatest Entertainer
"The Plane (So High)" (with The Get Fresh Crew)	1988	—	—	—	The World's Greatest Entertainer
"Bounce"	1993	—	—	—	Non-album single
"Where’s da Party At?"	1995	8	81	21	Play
"Freak It Out!" (featuring Uncle Luke)	1996	—	—	—	Play
"Superstition" (featuring Miss Jones) (Note: "Superstition" was released as a split promo single with "Keep on Risin'" by Jade featuring Lil' Rachett and VAZ.)	1997	—	—	—	The 6th Man Soundtrack
"—" denotes a recording that did not chart or was not released in that territory. "*" indicates a chart that did not exist at the time.

=== Guest appearances ===
- "We Not Giving Up" (2005, The Xtatik Experience) (featuring Doug E Fresh and Machel Montano)
- "You'll Never Know" (2005, E-Z Rollers) (featuring Doug E. Fresh & Sharon Brown)
- "Rhyme & Punishment" (2005, E-Z Rollers) (featuring Doug E. Fresh) [Distorted Minds Remix]
- "Rhyme & Punishment" (2005, E-Z Rollers) (featuring Doug E. Fresh)
- "Virgo" (2005) (with Ludacris and Nas)
- "Ready" (2017) (with Bell Biv DeVoe)
