= Excuse My French (album) =

Studio album by French Montana
- Released: May 21, 2013
- Recorded: 2011–13
- Genre: Hip hop; trap
- Length: 55:05
- Label: Coke Boys; Bad Boy; MMG; Interscope
- Producer: Sean Combs (exec.); Rick Ross (exec.); Harve Pierre (co-exec.); Allen Ritter; The Arsenals; The Beat Bully; Bos; Cardiak; DannyBoyStyles; Jahlil Beats; Earl & E; Harry Fraud; J.Oliver; Lee on the Beats; Lex Luger; Mike Will Made It; Reefa; 12Keyz; Rick Steel; Rico Love; Rob Holladay; Vinylz; Young Chop

French Montana chronology
Mac & Cheese 3 (2012)	Excuse My French (2013)	Coke Boys 4 (2014)

Singles from Excuse My French
- 1. "Pop That" Released: June 15, 2012; 2. "Freaks" Released: February 14, 2013; 3. "Ain't Worried About Nothin'" Released: April 15, 2013

Excuse My French is the debut studio album by Moroccan-American rapper French Montana. It was released on May 21, 2013, by Coke Boys Records, Bad Boy Records, Maybach Music Group and Interscope Records. The album features guest appearances from Diddy, Nicki Minaj, Drake, Ace Hood, Lil Wayne, Birdman, The Weeknd, Rick Ross, 2 Chainz, Max B, Ne-Yo, Machine Gun Kelly, Raekwon, Scarface and Snoop Dogg, while the production was handled by Mike Will Made It, Jahlil Beats, Reefa, Rico Love, Lex Luger and Young Chop. The album was supported by three singles: "Pop That", "Freaks" and "Ain't Worried About Nothin'".

Excuse My French garnered negative reviews from critics, finding criticism in Montana's technical delivery and the formulaic production throughout the record. The album debuted at number four on the US Billboard 200, selling 56,000 copies in its first week.

== Background ==
French Montana revealed in a September 2012 interview with RapFix Live that he has worked with several fellow recording artists on the album, including Diddy, Nicki Minaj, Drake, Rick Ross, Lil Wayne, Wiz Khalifa, 2 Chainz, Wale, Max B, Lana Del Rey, M.I.A., and Scarface. Montana also stated that he had a song with R&B singer The Weeknd, entitled "Gifted". In addition, on January 26, 2013, he revealed in an interview with Rap-Up TV that he had also worked with Kanye West on the album. The album cover was released on January 29, 2013.

In another January 2013 interview with Rap-Up he announced he had a song with Wiz Khalifa and Snoop Dogg on the album and that producers on the album would include Young Chop, Harry Fraud and Rico Love. Also saying that the album would be the "album of the decade". The final track list would also reveal features from DJ Khaled, Mavado, Ace Hood, Jeremih, Raekwon, Fabolous, Trey Songz, Machine Gun Kelly, Red Cafe, Chinx Drugz, Johnny May Cash and Los. Max B performs the album's intro in a phone-in from jail with Mikey T The Movie Star During the promotional run for the album French told Hot 97 that the only artist he paid to make an appearance on his album was Max B.

== Release and promotion ==
The album was originally set for a July 17, 2012 release before being pushed back to fall 2012. On December 20, 2012, Montana revealed that the release date would be March 12, 2013. However, it was later postponed again to April 16, 2013, and once more until May 21, 2013.

On November 19, 2012, Montana released a new mixtape, entitled Mac & Cheese 3. The mixtape included appearances from Diddy, MGK, Fat Joe, Wale, Mac Miller, Curren$y, Rick Ross, J. Cole, Trina, Prodigy, Tyga, and Ace Hood. In addition, the tape features production from Young Chop and Rico Love, among others. As of January 26, the mixtape has been downloaded more than 1 million times on mixtape hosting site DatPiff.

From February 26 to March 26, 2013, Montana embarked on the Excuse My French tour ahead of the album's official issuance. He later released 30 second snippets for every song on the record on May 12, 2013. In 2017, it was confirmed that J. Cole was originally an executive producer for the album.

== Singles ==
The first official single released from Excuse My French was "Pop That", which featured Rick Ross, Drake, and Lil Wayne, with production from Lee on the Beats. The song was released on June 15, 2012, and peaked at 36 on the US Billboard Hot 100. On January 26, 2013, Montana announced that the next single would be released within the next week and is a remake of the song "Freaks", which originally appeared on the debut album of rapper Lil Vicious, Destination Brooklyn. "Freaks" featuring Nicki Minaj was premiered on Hot 97 on February 13, 2013, and released to iTunes the next day. On February 18, 2013, the music video was filmed for "Freaks". On March 7, 2013. the music video for "Freaks" featuring Nicki Minaj was released. On March 12, 2013, the single was released to Rhythm Crossover radio.

The song "Ain't Worried About Nothin'" would be released as the third official single, for digital download on April 15, 2013. It is his first career solo single. A music video was filmed in late April and released on May 7, 2013. The first promotional single released off the album was titled "Marble Floors" featuring Rick Ross, Lil Wayne and 2 Chainz was released on December 4, 2012. On June 19, 2013, the music video was released for "I Told Em". On September 9, 2013, the music video was released for "If I Die". On September 23, 2013, the music video was released for the Birdman and Rick Ross collaboration "Trap House". On October 15, 2013, the music video for "Gifted" featuring The Weeknd was released. On November 18, 2013, the music video was released for "Once in a While" featuring Max B. On January 20, 2014, the music video was released for "Paranoid" featuring Johnny May Cash.

== Critical reception ==
Professional ratings
Review scores
Source	Rating
AllMusic	3/5 stars
The A.V. Club	D
DJBooth	3/5 stars
Exclaim!	0.5/5 stars
HipHopDX	2.5/5 stars
Pitchfork	3.5/10
Rolling Stone	2.5/5 stars
RapReviews	1.5/10
Spin	5/10
XXL	(L)

Excuse My French was met with generally mixed to negative reviews from music critics. At Metacritic, which assigns a weighted mean rating out of 100 to reviews from mainstream critics, the album received an average score of 54, based on 14 reviews, which indicates "mixed or average reviews". David Jeffries of Allmusic gave the album three stars out of five saying, "Montana is a flossy tycoon first and a wordsmith second at this point, so his handing in a high-power mixtape instead of a focused debut is to be expected, and with a little bottle service, enjoyed." Simon Vozick-Levinson of Rolling Stone gave the album two and a half stars out of five, saying "He’s a man of few words – many of his hooks consist of a single staccato phrase, looped until it verges on nonsense. When these mantras connect, they’re indelible. When they don’t, it’s like being smacked in the face repeatedly with an iced-out chain."

Ian Cohen of Pitchfork Media gave the album a 3.5 out of 10, saying "Forcing French Montana into that #1 spot and having it come off like a transplant rejection actually lets us know the genre’s in fine health." Joven Haye of DJBooth gave the album three out of five stars, saying "Ultimately, Excuse My French was very predictable. If you were looking for music to ride around to this summer, then it is the perfect album. On the flip side, if you somewhat bought into French’s “10 year” comment, I can't believe you won't leave disappointed." Peter Marrack of Exclaim! gave the album a one out of ten, saying "Excuse My French is almost exclusively loud and aggressive, which has become the formula for this type of thing: programmed, repetitive hi-hats, 808s and a guest verse by Rick Ross. It's the kind of sweatshop beat-making mainstream producers have learned to accept as they cash their cheques. Lyrically, Montana does what any cat on the corner can do: talk slick."

Bruce Smith of HipHopDX gave the album two and a half stars out of five, saying "Excuse My French comes off as extremely formulaic. While excessive tales of flossing, the streets, and misogyny are nothing new to Hip Hop, the complete lack of creativity those subjects are executed with on this project, whether it be lyrically or instrumentally, make it a hard listen." David Turner of Spin gave the album a five out of ten, saying "French has a great, unique adlib ("Haaan"), an identifiable voice, and a face recognizable in a silhouette. But on Excuse My French, he's outshone and undervalued." Dan Buyanovsky of XXL gave the album an L, saying "There’s enough big boasts and big beats here to carry French’s charm, which is really all you could ask for with a debut LP from the Bad Boy."

== Commercial performance ==
Excuse My French debuted at number four on the US Billboard 200 chart, selling 56,000 copies in its first week. In its second week, the album dropped to number 18 on the chart, selling an additional 18,000 copies. In its third week, the album dropped to number 35 on the chart, selling 11,000 more copies. In its fourth week, the album dropped to number 55 on the chart, selling 8,400 more copies that week. As of October 2016, the album has sold 177,000 copies. On May 8, 2020, the album was certified gold by the Recording Industry Association of America (RIAA) for combined sales and album-equivalent units of over 500,000 units in the United States.

== Track listing ==
No.	Title	Writer(s)	Producer(s)	Length
1.	"Once in a While" (featuring Max B)	Karim Kharbouch; Skip Prokop; Kanye West; Dwayne Carter, Jr.; Dominick Lamb; Norman Landsberg; Felix Pappalardi; John Ventura; Leslie Weinstein; Charly Wingate	MOON	4:47
2.	"Trap House" (featuring Birdman and Rick Ross)	Kharbouch; Bryan Williams; William Roberts II; Orlando Tucker	Jahlil Beats	4:24
3.	"Ain't Worried About Nothin'"	Kharbouch; Richard Butler, Jr.; Earl Hood; Eric Goudy III	Rico Love; Earl & E	3:32
4.	"Paranoid" (featuring Johnny May Cash)	Kharbouch; Nayvadius Wilburn; Tyree Pittman; Tyrone Pittman	Young Chop	4:27
5.	"When I Want"	Kharbouch; Danny Schofield	Danny Boy Styles	3:38
6.	"Fuck What Happens Tonight" (featuring DJ Khaled, Mavado, Ace Hood, Snoop Dogg and Scarface)	Kharbouch; Khaled Khaled; David Brooks; Brad Jordan; Antoine McColister; Calvin Broadus, Jr.; Anthony Tucker; Joseph Jefferson; Charles Simmons	The Beat Bully	5:27
7.	"Gifted" (featuring The Weeknd)	Kharbouch; Abel Tesfaye; Ahmad Balshe; Amir Esmailian; Schofield	Danny Boy Styles	4:08
8.	"Ballin' Out" (featuring Jeremih and Diddy)	Kharbouch; Jeremih Felton; Carlos Coleman; Carl McCormick	Cardiak	4:25
9.	"I Told Em"	Kharbouch; Jeffery Robinson	J.Oliver	4:22
10.	"Pop That" (featuring Drake, Rick Ross and Lil Wayne)	Kharbouch; Roberts II; Aubrey Graham; Carter, Jr.; Anthony Norris; Luther Campbell	Lee on the Beats	5:03
11.	"Freaks" (featuring Nicki Minaj)	Kharbouch; Onika Maraj; Butler, Jr.; Hood; Goudy III; Douglas Davis; Quame Riley; Everton Bonner; Sly Dunbar; John Taylor; Lloyd Willis	Rico Love; Earl & E	3:02
12.	"We Go Wherever We Want" (featuring Ne-Yo and Raekwon)	Kharbouch; Shaffer Smith; Corey Woods; Anderson Hernandez; Allen Ritter; Robert Diggs	Vinylz; Allen Ritter (co.); Reefa (add.); 12Keyz (add.)	4:17
13.	"Bust It Open"	Kharbouch; Austin Woolridge; Brandon Huggins; Campbell; Harry Casey; Rick Finch	The Arsenals	3:27
Total length:				55:05

Bonus track
No.	Title	Writer(s)	Producer(s)	Length
14.	"40" (featuring Trey Songz and Fabolous)	Kharbouch; Tremaine Neverson; John Jackson; Lexus Lewis	Lex Luger	4:12

Deluxe edition
No.	Title	Writer(s)	Producer(s)	Length
14.	"Drink Freely" (featuring Rico Love)	Kharbouch; Butler, Jr.; Pierre Medor	Rico Love	4:08
15.	"Throw It in the Bag" (featuring Chinx Drugz)	Kharbouch; Lionel Pickens; Kevin Randolph; Mathangi Apulpragasm; Dave Taylor; Christopher Mercer	Bos	5:05
16.	"Marble Floors" (featuring Rick Ross, Lil Wayne and 2 Chainz)	Kharbouch; Roberts II; Carter, Jr.; Tauheed Epps; Michael Williams II	Mike Will Made It	3:50
17.	"Ocho Cinco" (featuring Diddy, Machine Gun Kelly, Los and Red Café)	Kharbouch; Sean Combs; Jermaine Denny; Richard Baker; Carlos Coleman; Pittman; Rob Holladay	Young Chop; Rob Holladay (add.)	4:06

Deluxe edition (bonus track)
No.	Title	Writer(s)	Producer(s)	Length
18.	"40" (featuring Trey Songz and Fabolous)	Kharbouch; Tremaine Neverson; John Jackson; Lexus Lewis	Lex Luger	4:12

iTunes deluxe edition bonus track
No.	Title	Writer(s)	Producer(s)	Length
19.	"If I Die"	Kharbouch; Sharif Slater; Kibwe Luke	Reefa, 12Keyz	2:49

Best Buy deluxe edition bonus tracks
No.	Title	Writer(s)	Producer(s)	Length
20.	"Hey My Guy" (featuring Max B)	Kharbouch; Wingate	Young Los	3:57
21.	"Ghetto Prayer" (featuring Mavado)	Kharbouch; Brooks; Rory Quigley	Harry Fraud	3:46

Sample credits

- "Once in a While" contains a sample of "Barry Bonds" performed by Kanye West featuring Lil Wayne.
- "Fuck What Happens Tonight" contains a sample of "I Got Over Love" performed by Major Harris.
- "Pop That" contains element and a recording sample of "I Wanna Rock" performed by Uncle Luke.
- "Freaks" contains a sample from "Freaks" performed by Lil Vicious and contains the lyrics of the song "Murder She Wrote".
- "We Go Wherever We Want" contains interpolations of "Ice Cream" written by RZA.
- "Bust It Open" contains an interpolation of "I Wanna Rock" performed by Uncle Luke.
- "Throw it in the Bag" contains a sample of "Steppin Up" performed by M.I.A.

== Charts ==
=== Weekly charts ===
Chart (2013)	Peak position
Canadian Albums Chart	11
UK Albums Chart	78
UK R&B Albums (Official Charts)	5
US Billboard 200	4
US Top R&B/Hip-Hop Albums (Billboard)	1
US Top Rap Albums (Billboard)	1

=== Year-end charts ===
Chart (2013)	Position
US Billboard 200	197
US Top R&B/Hip-Hop Albums (Billboard)	44

== Certifications ==
Region	Certification	Certified units/sales
United States (RIAA)	Platinum	1,000,000^{‡}
^{‡} Sales+streaming figures based on certification alone.

== Release history ==
Regions	Dates	Label(s)
United States	May 21, 2013	Coke Boys, Bad Boy Records, Maybach Music Group, Interscope Records
