= Freaks (French Montana song) =

Single by French Montana featuring Nicki Minaj

from the album Excuse My French
- Released: February 14, 2013
- Recorded: 2012
- Genre: Hip hop, dancehall
- Length: 3:03
- Label: Coke Boys; Bad Boy; MMG; Interscope
- Songwriter(s): Karim Kharbouch; Onika Maraj; Richard Butler Jr.; Earl Hood; Eric Goudy III; Douglas L. Davis; Quame Riley; Everton Bonner; Sly Dunbar; John Christopher Taylor; Lloyd Oliver Willis
- Producer(s): Rico Love; Earl & E

French Montana singles chronology
"Pop That" (2012)	"Freaks" (2013)	"NBA" (2013)

Nicki Minaj singles chronology
"Freedom" (2012)	"Freaks" (2013)	"Tapout" (2013)

"Freaks" is a song by American hip hop recording artist French Montana and features Nicki Minaj. It was released on February 14, 2013, as the second single from his debut studio album Excuse My French (2013). The song was produced by Rico Love and Earl & E from Division 1.

== Background ==
On January 26, 2013, French Montana announced that his next single "Freaks" would be released within the next week, the song contains samples of the song "Freaks", which originally appeared on the debut album of rapper Lil Vicious, Destination Brooklyn. "Freaks" featuring Nicki Minaj was premiered on Hot 97 on February 13, 2013, and released to iTunes the next day.

== Music video ==
On February 18, 2013, the music video was filmed for "Freaks". On March 7, 2013, the music video was released.

== Remix ==
On April 25, 2013 the official remix was released featuring DJ Khaled, Mavado, Rick Ross, Wale and Nicki Minaj along with a new verse by French Montana.

== Track listing ==
Digital single

No.	Title	Writer(s)	Producer(s)	Length
1.	"Freaks" (featuring Nicki Minaj)	Karim Kharbouch, Onika Maraj, Richard Butler Jr., Earl Hood, Eric Goudy III, Douglas L. Davis, Quame Riley, Everton Bonner, Sly Dunbar, John Christopher Taylor, Lloyd Oliver Willis	Rico Love, Earl & E	3:03

== Charts ==
=== Weekly charts ===
Chart (2013)	Peak position
France (SNEP)	140
Netherlands (Single Top 100)	77
US Billboard Hot 100	77
US Hot R&B/Hip-Hop Songs (Billboard)	25

=== Year-end charts ===
Chart (2013)	Position
US Hot R&B/Hip-Hop Songs (Billboard)	95

== Certifications ==
Region	Certification	Certified units/sales
United States (RIAA)	Gold	500,000^{‡}
^{‡} Sales+streaming figures based on certification alone.

== Release history ==
Country	Date	Format	Label
United States	February 15, 2013	Digital download	Bad Boy Records, Interscope
United States	March 12, 2013	Rhythm Crossover radio	Bad Boy Records, Interscope
