= Doug E. Fresh =

Barbadian-American rapper (born 1966)

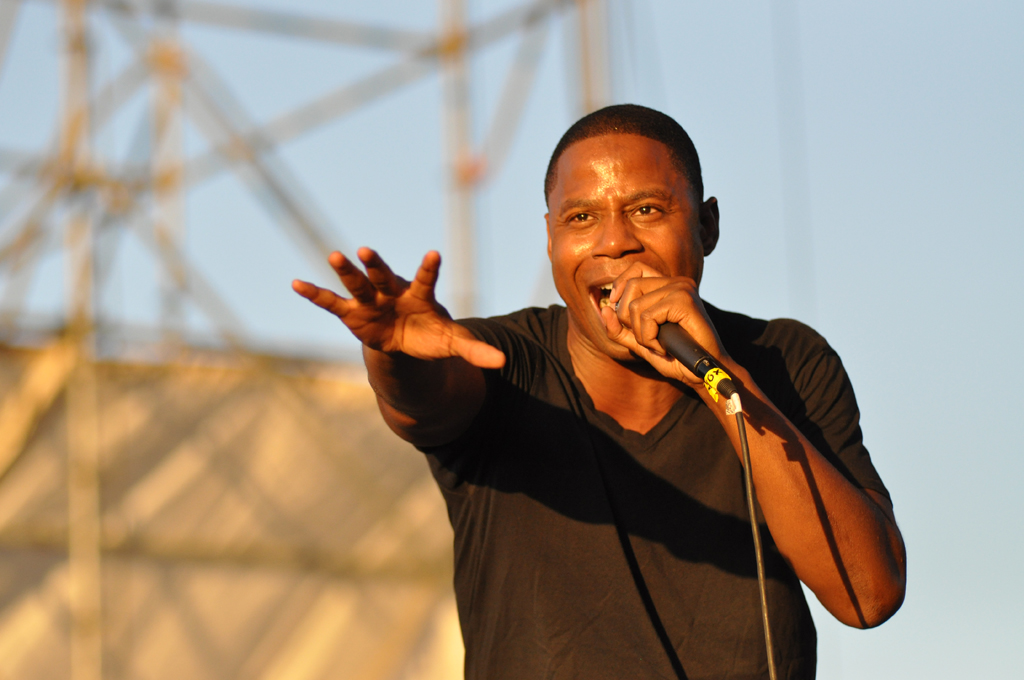
- Fresh performing in Brooklyn, 2010

Background information
- Born: Douglas Davis; September 17, 1966 (age 60); Bridgetown, Barbados
- Origin: Manhattan, New York City, U.S.
- Genre: Hip-hop
- Occupations: Rapper; record producer; beatboxer; songwriter
- Years active: 1983–present
- Labels: Reality/Fantasy; Bust It/Capitol; Gee Street

Douglas Davis (born September 17, 1966), known professionally as Doug E. Fresh, is a Barbadian-born American rapper, record producer, and beatboxer, also known as the "Human Beat Box". The pioneer of 20th-century American beatboxing, Fresh is able to accurately imitate drum machines and various special effects using only his mouth, lips, gums, throat, tongue and a microphone.

In the early 1980s he formed the Lover Boy Crew with DJs Chill Will and Barry B and later added rapper Slick Rick. Two of their songs "The Show" and "La Di Da Di" are considered early hip hop classics. "La Di Da Di", in particular, is one of the most sampled songs in music history.

== Early life ==
Doug E. Fresh was born in Barbados and also had family roots in Trinidad and Tobago. His grandfather, who lived in Harlem, raised him. In his school's music program, Fresh played drums / percussion and the trumpet. After the school cut its music department's budget, Fresh had to return the trumpet.

Fresh became acquainted with rapping when his brother brought home tapes of Grandmaster Flash and the Furious Five and DJ Hollywood. A neighbourhood rap group called D & D Express had a member known as Teddy D., whose nephews made hip hop music in a store basement by experimenting with a turntable's echo chamber. It was there that Fresh joined in on the mic and started to rap. A fan of Langston Hughes, Fresh wrote poetry rhymes and also won his school's Langston Hughes award.

During this time, several local rap groups popped up, including Ray Von and Johnny Wa, Harlem World, Celebrity Club, and Randy’s Place. The groups would throw rap parties in cafeterias of area elementary and high schools, which Fresh would attend. Fresh's rap crew included his cousins Damon and James; as fans of The Cold Crush Brothers, they named themselves the Cold Cash Crew.

Initially, Fresh went by several names including Dougie Doug, Dougie D, Law-D, Dougie Doug the Prince of Love, and Christian D and the Criss Cross Crew. The name Doug E. Fresh originated from an art piece of his name. The wall art at his school was supposed to read Dougie’s Fresh, but the artist incorrectly spelled it as "Doug E. Fresh" instead. Fresh used this new name when he rap battled at other schools.

Fresh next developed his beatboxing skills. Walking home after school, he would pass by a mom and pop record shop owned by Bobby Robinson, where records would play outside to passersby. There, Fresh heard artists like Grandmaster Flash, Spoonie Gee, and Funky 4 + 1, and he hummed along to the bass lines. In between records, Fresh would beatbox, to which his friends reacted enthusiastically. At a park party in the Lincoln Projects of East Harlem, Fresh rapped and beatboxed live. At another event soon after, Kurtis Blow, who produced for The Fat Boys, recruited Fresh to beatbox because Blow lacked turntables and needed instrumentals to perform over.

== Music career ==
Fresh began his recording career as a solo artist; he was among the last artists on Enjoy Records and one of the first on Vintertainment Records (the same New York-based label owned by Vincent Davis that would later make a name for hip-hop artist Joeski Love and bring R&B singer Keith Sweat to ultimate fame). He and a new team of DJs known as the Get Fresh Crew (Barry Bee and Chill Will), along with newcomer MC Ricky D (who would later achieve fame as Slick Rick), came to fledgling New Jersey-based hip-hop label Danya/Reality Records the following year and recorded "The Show", which borrowed the melody of the Inspector Gadget theme by Shuki Levy. They also recorded "La Di Da Di", a tune that was completely voiced by MC Ricky D and backed by Fresh's beatboxing for the entire duration of the song. The release of these two songs as a 12" single launched Fresh (and Slick Rick) into stardom. Both songs are considered among the greatest early hip-hop classics. "The Show" peaked at No. 7 on the UK Singles Chart in December 1985.

Fresh was interviewed in the 1986 Dutch documentary Big Fun in the Big Town. Slick Rick left the group almost a year after the release of "The Show"/"La Di Da Di" single, reappearing in 1988 as a Def Jam artist and releasing his debut album, The Great Adventures of Slick Rick. Doug E. Fresh and the Get Fresh Crew continued on, now officially signed to Danya/Reality/Fantasy, by releasing Oh, My God! in 1986, which included the hit song "All the Way to Heaven". In 1988, The World's Greatest Entertainer was released, featuring the song "Keep Risin' to the Top", which was named after Keni Burke's then-obscure 1981 hit "Rising to the Top" (which has since become Burke's signature song). Doug E. Fresh's "Keep Risin' to the Top" also samples the main chorus of Heatwave's 1976 classic "Ain't No Half Steppin'," which Big Daddy Kane also sampled that same year for his song of the same name.

In 1992, after a four-year hiatus, Fresh joined MC Hammer's label Bust It Records and issued the album Doin' What I Gotta Do, a commercial failure despite some minor acclaim for the single "Bustin' Out (On Funk)", which sampled Rick James's 1979 single "Bustin' Out".

In 1993, Fresh found a new home at Island Records-affiliated label Gee Street. However, he only released one single containing three songs: "I-ight (Alright)" (the main track), "Bounce" and "Freaks". Although "I-ight" (which originated the now-famous club chant "Heyyyyyy, YO!... I-iiiiight?") was slated to become the first major hit for Fresh in five years, it was almost immediately overshadowed by "Freaks", a dancehall tune beatboxed entirely by Fresh and vocalized mainly by his protégé, a Brooklyn-born Jamaican teenage newcomer named Vicious. The song received major radio and club play, followed by video play in early 1994. Vicious would soon ink a deal with Sony Music's Epic Records for three years, although he would only release one album, Destination Brooklyn.

In 1995, Slick Rick and Fresh reunited for a track on an album titled Play, which received positive reviews; Bret Love wrote, "A welcome flashback to the days when guns, drugs, sex, and violence were not the genre's primary lyrical focus." Also on the Play album was "Freak It Out", which featured Uncle Luke. It was produced by platinum producer Frankie Cutlass and appeared on the Don't Be a Menace to South Central While Drinking Your Juice in the Hood soundtrack. Play was certified gold by the RIAA.

=== Post Play (since 2007) ===
On May 23, 2007, Fresh performed variations on "The Show" with finalist Blake Lewis on the sixth-season finale of American Idol, the first ever hip-hop performance on the show.

In 2007, Fresh resurfaced when the song "My Dougie" by Dallas rapper Lil Wil introduced a dance called the "Dougie". This local dance featured a modified version of Fresh's trademark dance moves, particularly his head-rubbing gestures, and gave Fresh his due credit. Members of the one-hit wonder rap group Cali Swag District produced their 2010 song "Teach Me How to Dougie" after seeing Texas college students doing the Dougie. This song popularized the dance, spreading it outside the Dirty South.

On June 27, 2010, Fresh performed with Cali Swag District on "Teach Me How to Dougie" at the BET Awards pre-show. He also performed a concert called "The Show" at the Paradise Theater on August 12, 2010. On November 8, 2010, Fresh appeared at the Soul Train Awards, where he taught CNN anchor Wolf Blitzer how to Dougie on stage as part of the show. On December 10, 2010, Fresh appeared on ESPN First Take to speak about the phenomenon of the Dougie as a sports celebration and voted on the best sports-related Dougie dances, selecting that of host Skip Bayless, though he rated Wolf Blitzer's Dougie at the Soul Train Awards as better but with no sports association.

On October 28, 2011, Fresh performed at the Paradise Theater in a concert to benefit New York City's public hospitals; the show was part of "STAT! for NYC's Public Hospitals" to raise funds to reduce gun violence. On July 9, 2012, Fresh served as a celebrity judge on the Apollo Live TV show. Beginning May 25, 2013, Fresh hosted a classic hip-hop and R&B show called "The Show" on New York's 107.5 WBLS, which aired 9:00-11:00 p.m. Saturdays until the final broadcast on December 31, 2016.

Fresh served as a guest mentor to Jeff Dye and Joe Jonas, and performed with them on the show I Can Do That on June 30, 2015.

Fresh was awarded the Lifetime Achievement Award at the 2019 American Beatbox Championships for his achievements in the music industry, as well as his role as a leading figure in the world of beatboxing. Prior to receiving the award, Fresh presented the Lifetime Achievement Award to Rahzel in 2017.

On September 24, 2021, he released his first full-length album since 1995, titled This One's for Chuck Brown: Doug E. Fresh Salutes The Godfather of Go-Go.

Fresh cameoed in the 2023 film World's Best.

On September 27, 2024, Fresh was featured on Southern Soul Hip Hop pioneer Joe-Nice's single "Southern Soul Party" alongside Nelson Curry. In 2025, the trio teamed up again for the underground Southern Soul hit, "Juke Joint Lover Remix."

Fresh appeared on Hell's Kitchen as a chef's table guest for the red team during the twenty-fifth season's fifth dinner service.

== Personal life ==
Fresh is a member of the Church of Scientology. He performed for a large audience at the Scientology Celebrity Center's Anniversary Gala in 2004. He also performed two tracks on the Scientology music album The Joy of Creating (other artists appearing included Isaac Hayes, Chick Corea, Edgar Winter and Carl Anderson).

In April 2007, a storefront for Doug E.'s Chicken and Waffles appeared at the corner of 132nd Street and Adam Clayton Powell Boulevard in Harlem. Work continued on the location for more than three years until the eatery finally opened its doors in November 2010. The inspiration to open came from Sylvia's. The location closed permanently in 2015. In 2013, Fresh had plans of opening a second restaurant. Fresh has stated he has a club called Fresh.

Fresh has a foundation called Hip Hop Public Health, and he has been the spokesperson for the Hip Hop Public Health Education Center at Harlem Hospital Center.

== Discography ==
=== Studio albums ===
- Oh, My God! (1986)
- The World's Greatest Entertainer (1988)
- Doin' What I Gotta Do (1992)
- Play (1995)

== See also ==
- List of people from Harlem
