= Play (Doug E. Fresh album) =

Studio album by Doug E. Fresh
- Released: September 26, 1995
- Genre: Hip hop
- Length: 67:16
- Label: Gee Street/Island/PolyGram
- Producer: Doug E. Fresh; Frankie Cutlass; Todd Terry; Easy Mo Bee

Doug E. Fresh chronology
Doin' What I Gotta Do (1992)	Play (1995)	This One's for Chuck Brown: Doug E. Fresh Salutes The Godfather of Go-Go (2021)

Play is the fourth album by the American rapper Doug E. Fresh, released in 1995. It contains production from Doug E. Fresh, Frankie Cutlass, and Todd Terry. The album peaked at No. 81 on the Billboard Top R&B/Hip-Hop Albums chart, but several singles—"Where's da Party At?", "Freaks", "Hands in the Air", and "I-ight"—made it to the Hot Rap Singles chart. Luther Campbell appears on the album.

== Critical reception ==
Professional ratings
Review scores
Source	Rating
AllMusic	3/5 stars
The Encyclopedia of Popular Music	2/5 stars
The Indianapolis Star	1/4 stars
(The New) Rolling Stone Album Guide	2.5/5 stars

The Colorado Springs Gazette-Telegraph considered the album to be "reminiscent of a time when house parties took place in basements, with blue lights in the sockets and where a hundred bodies danced in harmony to Sugarhill Gang tunes." The Indianapolis Star noted that "scratches, drum machines and keyboards spit out dancehall reggae, but it seems Fresh hasn't spent any time developing rhythms or raps."

== Track listing ==
1. "Where’s da Party At?" – 4:25
2. "It’s On" (featuring Singing Melody and Vicious) – 4:07
3. "Take ’Em Uptown" – 4:38
4. "I-Ight" – 4:45
5. "The Original Old School!" (featuring The Cold Crush Brothers, DJ Hollywood, Lovebug Starski and The Furious Five) – 5:39
6. "Freaks" (featuring Vicious) – 3:08
7. "Freak It Out!" (featuring Uncle Luke) – 6:34
8. "It’s Really Goin’ on in Here" (featuring Miss Jones and Shock Dog) – 6:51
9. "Who’s Got All the Money?" – 3:55
10. "Get da Money" (featuring Illaquin and Mansome Batez) – 5:56
11. "Hands in the Air" (featuring Beenie Man) – 4:11
12. "Doug E. Got It Goin’ On" (featuring Miss Jones) – 5:08
13. "Keep It Going" (featuring Miss Jones) – 3:28
14. "Breath of Fresh Air" (featuring Illaquin, K-Superior, Mansome Batez, The Diggy Dime and Vigilante) – 4:31

== Charts ==
Chart (1995)	Peak position
US Top R&B/Hip-Hop Albums (Billboard)	81
