= Ain't Worried About Nothin' =

Single by French Montana

from the album Excuse My French
- Released: April 15, 2013
- Recorded: 2013
- Genre: Hip hop
- Length: 3:32
- Label: Coke Boys; Bad Boy; MMG; Interscope
- Songwriters: Kharbouch; Richard Preston Butler Jr.; Earl Hood; Eric Goudy III
- Producers: Rico Love; Earl & E

French Montana singles chronology
"NBA" (2013)	"Ain't Worried About Nothin'" (2013)	"Shisha" (2013)

Music video
- "Ain't Worried About Nothin'" on YouTube

"Ain't Worried About Nothin'" is a song by American rapper French Montana for his debut studio album Excuse My French (2013). It was released on April 15, 2013, as the third single from the album. The song was written and produced by Rico Love and Earl & E, with additional songwriting provided by Montana. "Ain't Worried About Nothin'" peaked at number 63 on the U.S. Billboard Hot 100. An accompanying music video was released on May 7, 2013.

An official remix of "Ain't Worried About Nothin'" was released on October 4, 2013; it features rappers Rick Ross, Diddy and Snoop Dogg. An additional remix featuring recording artist Miley Cyrus premiered online on October 14.

== Music video ==
A music video was filmed in late April and released on May 7, 2013, for the song. Rappers Rick Ross, DJ Khaled and Sean Combs make cameo appearances in the video.

== Remixes ==
A video posted by Montana previewed the song and revealed that Miley Cyrus was to be featured on the remix. Then the first official remix was released on October 4, 2013, featuring Rick Ross, Diddy and Snoop Dogg. Then, on October 14, 2013, the remix featuring Miley Cyrus was released.

On June 17, 2013, a remix by DJ Skee was released featuring verses by West Coast rappers Game, Dizzy Wright, Crooked I and Problem.

== Charts ==
=== Weekly charts ===
Chart (2013)	Peak position
US Billboard Hot 100	63
US Hot R&B/Hip-Hop Songs (Billboard)	18
US Hot Rap Songs (Billboard)	14

=== Year-end charts ===
Chart (2013)	Position
US Hot R&B/Hip-Hop Songs (Billboard)	59
US Rap Songs (Billboard)	46

== Certifications ==
Region	Certification	Certified units/sales
United States (RIAA)	Platinum	1,000,000^{‡}
^{‡} Sales+streaming figures based on certification alone.
