= The World's Greatest Entertainer =

Studio album by Doug E. Fresh
- Released: May 31, 1988
- Recorded: 1987–1988
- Genre: Hip hop
- Length: 48:08
- Label: Reality/Fantasy
- Producers: Doug E. Fresh; Eric "Vietnam" Sadler; Ollie Cotton; Carl Ryder

Doug E. Fresh chronology
Oh, My God! (1986)	The World's Greatest Entertainer (1988)	Doin' What I Gotta Do (1992)

Professional ratings
Review scores
Source	Rating
AllMusic	4.5/5 stars
The Rolling Stone Album Guide	1.5/5 stars

The World's Greatest Entertainer is the second album released by Doug E. Fresh. It was released in 1988 on Reality Records, a short-lived subsidiary of Fantasy Records, and was produced by Doug E. Fresh, Eric "Vietnam" Sadler, Ollie Cotton and Carl Ryder. The album gained a fair amount of success, peaking at #88 on the Billboard 200 and #7 on the Billboard Top R&B/Hip-Hop Albums chart, and featured the single "Keep Risin' to the Top," which peaked at #4 on the Hot R&B/Hip-Hop Singles & Tracks chart.

== Track listing ==
1. "Guess? Who?" - 4:26
2. "Every Body Got 2 Get Some" - 3:45
3. "D.E.F. = Doug E. Fresh" - 4:12
4. "On the Strength" - 2:50
5. "Keep Risin’ to the Top" - 3:50
6. "Greatest Entertainer" - 4:42
7. "I'm Gettin’ Ready" - 4:52
8. "Cut That Zero" - 3:53
9. "The Plane (So High)" - 4:04
10. "Ev’rybody Loves a Star" - 4:00
11. "Crazy ’Bout Cars" - 4:30
12. "Africa (Goin’ Back Home)" - 3:33

== Samples list ==
- "On the Strength"
  - "Mother Popcorn" by James Brown
- "Keep Risin' to the Top"
  - "Keep Rising to the Top" by Keni Burke
  - "Ain't No Half Steppin'" by Heatwave
- "Cut that Zero"
  - "Casanova" by LeVert
- "Ev'rybody Loves a Star"
  - "One More Chance" by The Jackson 5
  - "In the Air Tonight" by Phil Collins
  - "Uphill Peace of Mind" by Kid Dynamite

== Charts ==
=== Weekly charts ===
Chart (1988)	Peak position
US Billboard 200	88
US Top R&B/Hip-Hop Albums (Billboard)	7

=== Year-end charts ===
Chart (1988)	Position
US Top R&B/Hip-Hop Albums (Billboard)	39
