= Oh, My God! (Doug E. Fresh album) =

Studio album by Doug E. Fresh
- Released: July 7, 1986
- Genre: Hip hop
- Length: 40:16
- Label: Reality/Fantasy
- Producer: Dennis Bell; Ollie Cotton

Doug E. Fresh chronology
Oh, My God! (1986)	The World's Greatest Entertainer (1988)

Professional ratings
Review scores
Source	Rating
AllMusic	4.5/5 stars
Robert Christgau	B−
The Encyclopedia of Popular Music	3/5 stars
The Rolling Stone Album Guide	3/5 stars

Oh, My God! is the debut album by the rapper Doug E. Fresh. It was released in 1986 on Reality Records, a short-lived subsidiary of Fantasy Records. The album was produced by Dennis Bell and Ollie Cotton. The album was only a moderate success, peaking at #21 on the Top R&B Albums chart. To date, it has not been released on compact disc.

== Critical reception ==
Trouser Press wrote that "Fresh runs a moderate course, with a bit of reggae toasting, polite tracks and very little attitude." The Washington Post thought that "the sound concocted by DJs Chill Will and Barry Bee is a somewhat murky sonic collage built on rolling reggae rhythms."

== Track listing ==
1. "Nuthin'" - 3:02
2. "The Show (Oh, My God! Remix)" - 8:38
3. "Leave It Up to the Cut Professor" - 2:25
4. "Lovin' Ev'ry Minute of It" (Cyclone Ride)" - 4:24
5. "She Was the Type of Girl" - 5:26
6. "Abortion" - 4:21
7. "Chill Will Cuttin' It Up" - 0:40
8. "Play This Only at Night" - 5:15
9. "All the Way to Heaven" - 6:05

== Charts ==
Chart (1987)	Peak position
US Top R&B/Hip-Hop Albums (Billboard)	21
