= Doin' What I Gotta Do =

Studio album by Doug E. Fresh
- Released: May 5, 1992
- Recorded: 1991–1992
- Genre: Hip hop; new jack swing
- Length: 69:30
- Label: Bust It/Capitol/EMI
- Producer: Doug E. Fresh

Doug E. Fresh chronology
The World's Greatest Entertainer (1988)	Doin' What I Gotta Do (1992)	Play (1995)

Professional ratings
Review scores
Source	Rating
Allmusic	2.5/5 stars

Doin' What I Gotta Do is the third album by Doug E. Fresh. It was released May 5, 1992, on Bust It Records, a sub-label of Capitol Records set up by MC Hammer, and was produced by Doug E. Fresh. Compared to his previous two albums, both of which are considered hip-hop classics, Doin’ What I Gotta Do was neither a critical nor a commercial success, peaking at only #47 on the Top R&B/Hip-Hop Albums. The single "Bustin Out (On Funk)" made it to #28 on the Hot R&B/Hip-Hop Singles & Tracks. It samples the 1979 Rick James single "Bustin’ Out."

== Track listing ==
1. "D.O.A." – 1:07
2. "Bustin’ Out (On Funk)" – 4:01
3. "The Get Fresh Crew" – 4:50
4. "Back in the Dayz" – 4:48
5. "If I Was Your Man" – 4:34
6. "Come in from the Rain" – 5:28
7. "I Need My Woman Tonight" – 5:00
8. "Check It Out" – 3:43
9. "The History" – 2:47
10. "Imagine Me Just Pumpin' It Up" – 4:01
11. "You Make Me Wanna Shout" – 4:42
12. "The Money Grip" – 3:39
13. "There's Nothing Better" – 4:26
14. "I Love Myself" – 5:17
15. "No" – 4:49
16. "Vida Mia" – 2:26
17. "Peace to New York" – 3:54

== Charts ==
Chart (1992)	Peak position
US Top R&B/Hip-Hop Albums (Billboard)	47
