= DJ Hollywood =

American MC and disc jockey (born 1954)

- Born: Anthony Holloway; December 10, 1954 (age 71); Harlem, New York, U.S.
- Genres: Hip hop
- Occupations: Disc jockey, MC
- Years active: 1971–present

DJ Hollywood (born Anthony Holloway; December 10, 1954) is an American MC and disc jockey. His rhythmic MC sets have led him to be credited as one of the first-ever rappers.

== Career ==
In the 1970s, DJ Hollywood became known for DJ sets during which he addressed the audience with rhythmic call-and-response segments. In contrast to earlier MCs like Coke La Rock, who simply spoke over backing tracks, DJ Hollywood incorporated rhythm and rhyme into his sets, which has led him to be described as the progenitor of "hip-hop-style rapping" by figures such as Kurtis Blow and author Jonathan Abrams. Abrams identifies DJ Hollywood's influences as Jocko Henderson, Pigmeat Markham, Gil Scott-Heron, and Rudy Ray Moore.

In 1978 and 1979, DJ Hollywood was the first DJ to bring turntables and a mixer to perform at the Apollo Theater. Before long, club owners in the South Bronx hired Hollywood to play at a club called Club 371.

Most of DJ Hollywood's body of musical work was live, not recorded, although he did release a single "Shock Shock The House" in 1980 on CBS Records. Until the mid-1980s, Hollywood was one of the top DJs. He retired from the business and struggled with drug addiction. He has since returned to performing in the New York City area, appearing with Tha Veteranz which reunited him with his former partner Lovebug Starski.

DJ Hollywood is featured in the 2024 PBS series Disco: Soundtrack of a Revolution.
