= Destination Brooklyn =

Studio album by Vicious
- Released: November 1, 1994
- Recorded: 1993–1994
- Studios: The Crib (New York, NY); Palm Tree Studios (New York, NY); House of Hits (New York, NY); Howie's Cribb (Brooklyn, NY); Penthouse Studios (Kingston, Jamaica); Black Scorpio Studios (Kingston, Jamaica)
- Genres: Hip hop; reggae fusion; dancehall
- Length: 42:26
- Label: Epic Street
- Producers: Barry B.; Dave Kelly; DJ Clark Kent; Donovan Thomas; Doug E. Fresh; Howie Tee; Salaam Remi

Singles from Destination Brooklyn
- 1. "The Glock" Released: February 22, 1994; 2. "Nika" Released: 1994

Professional ratings
Review scores
Source	Rating
AllMusic	4/5 stars

Destination Brooklyn is the only studio album by American hip hop artist Vicious. It was released on November 1, 1994, through Epic Street/Sony Music Entertainment. Recording sessions took place at The Crib, Palm Tree Studios, House of Hits and Howie's Cribb in New York City, and at Penthouse Studios and Black Scorpio Studios in Kingston, Jamaica. Production was handled by Donovan Thomas, Dave Kelly, Howie Tee, Salaam Remi, Barry B., DJ Clark Kent and Doug E. Fresh. It features guest appearances from Beenie Man, Shyheim, and Vicious's mentor, Doug E. Fresh. The album consisted mainly of reggae fusion, a blend of reggae and hip hop.

The album did not reach the US Billboard 200, however, it peaked at number 37 on the Top R&B/Hip-Hop Albums, number 18 on the Heatseekers Albums and topped the Reggae Albums chart. It spawned two singles: "Glock" and "Nika". The latter made it to number 69 on the Billboard Hot 100 and number 39 on the Hot R&B/Hip-Hop Songs chart.

French Montana and Nicki Minaj sampled the hook from "Freaks" from their 2013 single of the same name.

== Track listing ==
No.	Title	Writer(s)	Producer	Length
1.	"Freaks"	Quame Riley; Douglas Davis	Doug E. Fresh; Barry B.	3:11
2.	"Him Never Do It"	Riley; Howard Thompson	Howie Tee	3:58
3.	"Life of a Shortie" (featuring Shyheim)	Riley; Shyheim Franklin; Salaam Remi Gibbs	Salaam Remi	4:02
4.	"Nika"	Riley; Rudolph Isley; O'Kelly Isley Jr.; Ronald Isley; Ernie Isley; Marvin Isley; Chris Jasper	DJ Clark Kent; Peter Panic (voc.)	4:46
5.	"The Glock"	Riley; Thompson	Howie Tee	4:20
6.	"Greetings"	Riley	Salaam Remi	3:46
7.	"Ghetto People"	Riley; Dave Kelly	Dave Kelly	4:13
8.	"The Lesson" (featuring Beenie Man)	Riley; Moses Davis	Donovan Thomas	2:50
9.	"Salute to the Donettes"	Riley; Donovan Thomas	Donovan Thomas	4:04
10.	"Good As"	Riley; Kelly	Dave Kelly	3:37
11.	"Nika (Radio Remix)"	Riley	Cory Rooney (add.); Prince Markie Dee (add.)	3:39
Total length:				42:26

Sample credits

- Track 4 embodies a portion of "Between the Sheets" performed by The Isley Brothers.

== Charts ==
Chart (1994)	Peak position
US Top R&B/Hip-Hop Albums (Billboard)	37
US Heatseekers Albums (Billboard)	18
US Reggae Albums (Billboard)	1
