= Vicious (singer) =

American singer

- Origin: Brooklyn, New York, U.S.
- Genres: Hip hop, reggae, reggae fusion
- Years active: 1990s
- Label: Epic Street/SME Records

Vicious (formerly Li'l Vicious) is an American singer and reggae artist who was active in the mid 1990s.

His debut album, Destination Brooklyn, was released on November 1, 1994. The album charted on three Billboard charts, peaking at number one on the Reggae charts. The single "Nika," which became his only charting single, reached number 69 on the Billboard Hot 100 and nine on the Hot Rap Singles chart.

Vicious was featured in the 1995 song "Runnin' from tha Police" (alongside 2Pac, The Notorious B.I.G., Dramacydal and Stretch) released for the album One Million Strong, where he sings the hook. The song charted at #81, #57 and #13 on the Billboard Hot 100, Hot R&B/Hip-Hop Singles & Tracks & Hot Rap Singles charts, respectively.

== Discography ==
=== Album ===
Year	Album	Peak chart positions		
Year	Album	U.S. R&B	U.S. Heat	U.S. Reggae
1994	Destination Brooklyn: Released: November 1, 1994; Label: Epic Street	37	18	1

=== Single ===
Year	Single	Chart positions			Album
Year	Single	U.S. Hot 100	U.S. R&B	U.S. Rap	Album
1994	"Nika"	69	39	9	Destination Brooklyn

=== Guest appearances ===
Year	Title	Other artists	Album
1995	"Runnin'"	2Pac, The Notorious B.I.G., Dramacydal, Stretch	One Million Strong
