= Fabolous discography =

Hip hop recording artist discography

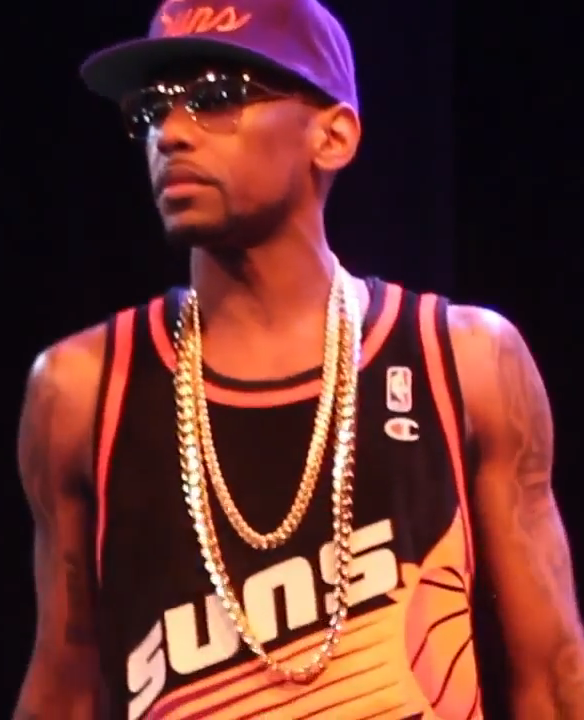
- Fabolous in 2014
- Studio albums: 7
- Extended plays: 2
- Singles: 58
- Music videos: 17
- Featured singles: 38
- Mixtapes: 11
- Collaborative albums: 1

The discography of American rapper Fabolous consists of seven studio albums, two extended plays, 58 singles (38 as a featured artist), and eleven mixtapes, amongst other recordings. Although he has been a flagship artist for Def Jam Recordings and Desert Storm Records, his first three studio albums were released by Elektra Records and Atlantic Records.

== Albums ==
=== Studio albums ===
List of studio albums, with selected chart positions, sales figures and certifications
Title	Album details	Peak chart positions									Sales	Certifications
Title	Album details	US	US R&B	US Rap	AUS	CAN	FRA	NLD	SWI	UK	Sales	Certifications
Ghetto Fabolous	Released: September 11, 2001 (US); Label: Desert Storm, Elektra; Formats: CD, LP, cassette, digital download	4	2	—	—	—	—	—	—	—	US: 1,000,000	RIAA: Platinum
Street Dreams	Released: March 4, 2003 (US); Label: Desert Storm, Elektra; Formats: CD, LP, digital download	3	3	—	82	—	120	34	—	51	US: 1,100,000	RIAA: Platinum; BPI: Gold
Real Talk	Released: November 9, 2004 (US); Label: Desert Storm, Atlantic; Formats: CD, LP, digital download	6	2	2	90	—	119	66	—	66	US: 550,000	RIAA: Gold
From Nothin' to Somethin'	Released: June 12, 2007 (US); Label: Desert Storm, Street Family, Def Jam; Formats: CD, LP, digital download	2	1	1	—	—	—	—	55	89	US: 542,000	RIAA: Gold
Loso's Way	Released: July 28, 2009 (US); Label: Desert Storm, Street Family, Def Jam; Formats: CD, LP, digital download	1	1	1	—	21	—	—	—	125	US: 500,000	RIAA: Gold
The Young OG Project	Released: December 25, 2014; Label: Desert Storm, Street Family, Def Jam; Formats: Digital download	12	3	3	—	—	—	—	—	—		
Summertime Shootout 3: Coldest Summer Ever	Released: November 29, 2019; Label: Street Family, Roc Nation, Def Jam; Formats: LP, digital download	7	3	3	—	39	—	—	—	—	US: 6,000	
"—" denotes a recording that did not chart or was not released in that territory.

=== Collaborative albums ===
List of studio albums, with selected chart positions, sales figures and certifications
Title	Album details	Peak chart positions		
Title	Album details	US	US R&B	US Rap
Friday on Elm Street (with Jadakiss)	Released: November 24, 2017; Label: Street Family, Roc Nation, D-Block, Def Jam; Formats: LP, digital download	10	3	3

== Extended plays ==
List of extended plays, with selected chart positions
Title	Album details	Peak chart positions		
Title	Album details	US	US R&B	US Rap
There Is No Competition 2: The Grieving Music EP	Released: August 31, 2010 (US); Label: Desert Storm, Def Jam; Formats: CD, digital download	32	9	4
Trappy New Years (with Trey Songz)	Released: December 31, 2016; Label: Self-released; Formats: Digital download	Free release		

== Mixtapes ==
List of mixtapes, with selected chart positions
Title	Album details	Peak chart positions		
Title	Album details	US	US R&B	UK
More Street Dreams, Pt. 2: The Mixtape	Released: November 4, 2003 (US); Label: Desert Storm, Elektra; Formats: CD, LP, digital download	28	8	191
Loso's Way: Rise to Power (with DJ Clue? and The Street Family)	Released: March 3, 2006 (US); Label: Desert Storm; Formats: Digital download	—	—	—
There Is No Competition (with DJ Drama)	Released: February 13, 2008; Label: Gangsta Grillz; Formats: Digital download	—	—	—
There Is No Competition 2: The Funeral Service (with DJ Drama)	Released: March 4, 2010; Label: Gangsta Grillz; Formats: Digital download	—	—	—
The S.O.U.L. Tape	Released: April 21, 2011; Label: Desert Storm; Formats: Digital download	—	—	—
There Is No Competition 3: Death Comes in 3's (with DJ Drama)	Released: December 25, 2011 (US); Label: Gangsta Grillz; Formats: Digital download	—	—	—
The S.O.U.L. Tape 2	Released: November 22, 2012 (US); Label: Desert Storm; Formats: Digital download	—	—	—
The S.O.U.L. Tape 3	Released: December 25, 2013; Label: Desert Storm; Formats: Digital download	—	—	—
Friday Night Freestyles	Released: May 23, 2015; Label: Desert Storm; Formats: Digital download	—	—	—
Summertime Shootout	Released: November 26, 2015; Label: Street Family, Roc Nation, Def Jam; Formats: CD, Digital download	—	—	—
Summertime Shootout 2: The Level Up	Released: September 3, 2016; Label: Street Family, Roc Nation, Def Jam; Formats: Digital download	—	—	—
"—" denotes a recording that did not chart or was not released in that territory.

== Singles ==
=== As lead artist ===
List of singles as lead artist, with selected chart positions and certifications, showing year released and album name
Title	Year	Peak chart positions								Certifications	Album
Title	Year	US	US R&B	US Rap	AUS	CAN	NL	NZ	UK	Certifications	Album
"Can't Deny It" (featuring Nate Dogg)	2001	25	13	11	—	—	—	—	—		Ghetto Fabolous
"Young'n (Holla Back)"	2001	33	17	9	—	—	—	—	—		Ghetto Fabolous
"Trade It All, Pt. 2" (featuring Jagged Edge and P. Diddy)	2002	20	14	8	—	—	—	—	—		Barbershop (soundtrack)
"Can't Let You Go" (featuring Lil' Mo and Mike Shorey)	2003	4	2	2	27	—	10	33	14	RMNZ: Platinum	Street Dreams
"Into You" (featuring Tamia or Ashanti)	2003	4	6	4	4	—	37	—	18	BPI: Platinum; RMNZ: 2× Platinum (featuring Tamia); RMNZ: Gold (featuring Ashanti)	Street Dreams
"Breathe"	2004	10	4	2	36	—	34	21	28	RIAA: Platinum	Real Talk
"Baby" (featuring Mike Shorey)	2005	71	22	17	86	—	—	—	41		Real Talk
"Diamonds" (featuring Young Jeezy)	2007	83	59	—	—	—	—	—	—		From Nothin' to Somethin'
"Make Me Better" (featuring Ne-Yo)	2007	8	2	1	—	79	—	—	—	RIAA: Platinum	From Nothin' to Somethin'
"Baby Don't Go" (featuring T-Pain or Jermaine Dupri)	2007	23	23	4	—	—	—	—	—	RIAA: Gold	From Nothin' to Somethin'
"Throw It in the Bag" (featuring The-Dream)	2009	14	4	2	—	—	—	—	—	RIAA: Platinum; RMNZ: Gold	Loso's Way
"My Time" (featuring Jeremih)	2009	— (Note: "My Time" did not enter the Billboard Hot 100, but peaked at number eight on the Bubbling Under Hot 100 Singles chart.)	— (Note: "My Time" did not enter the Hot R&B/Hip Hop songs chart, but peaked at number two on the Bubbling Under R&B/Hip Hop Singles chart.)	—	—	—	—	—	—	RIAA: Gold	Loso's Way
"Everything, Everyday, Everywhere" (featuring Keri Hilson)	2009	— (Note: "Everything, Everyday, Everywhere" did not enter the Billboard Hot 100, but peaked at number three on the Bubbling Under Hot 100 Singles chart.)	31	10	—	—	—	—	—		Loso's Way
"You Be Killin' Em"	2010	63	8	6	—	—	—	—	—	RIAA: Gold	There Is No Competition 2: The Grieving Music EP
"Ready" (featuring Chris Brown)	2013	93	28	20	—	—	—	—	—	RIAA: Gold	non-album singles
"When I Feel Like It" (featuring 2 Chainz)	2013	—	— (Note: "When I Feel Like It" did not enter the Hot R&B/Hip Hop songs chart, but peaked at number five on the Bubbling Under R&B/Hip Hop Singles chart.)	—	—	—	—	—	—		non-album singles
"Lituation"	2014	—	—	—	—	—	—	—	—		The Young OG Project
"Goyard Bag" (featuring Lil Uzi Vert)	2017	—	—	—	—	—	—	—	—		Summertime Shootout 2: The Level Up
"Flipmode" (featuring Velous and Chris Brown)	2017	—	—	—	—	—	—	—	—		non-album single
"Stand Up" (with Jadakiss featuring Future)	2017	—	—	—	—	—	—	—	—		Friday on Elm Street
"Ooh Yea" (featuring Ty Dolla Sign)	2018	—	—	—	—	—	—	—	—		Summertime Shootout 3: Coldest Summer Ever
"Choosy" (featuring Jeremih & Davido)	2019	—	—	—	—	—	—	—	—		Summertime Shootout 3: Coldest Summer Ever
"B.O.M.B.S."	2019	— (Note: "B.O.M.B.S." did not enter the Billboard Hot 100, but peaked at number twelve on the Bubbling Under Hot 100 Singles chart.)	—	—	—	—	—	—	—		Summertime Shootout 3: Coldest Summer Ever
"Say Less" (with French Montana)	2022	—	—	—	—	—	—	—	—		non-album singles
"Rich Hustle" (with Jim Jones)	2022	—	—	—	—	—	—	—	—		non-album singles
"Bach to Bach" (with Dave East)	2022	—	—	—	—	—	—	—	—		non-album singles
"Curious" (with Eric Bellinger and Cordae)	2023	—	—	—	—	—	—	—	—		1-800-Hit Eazy: Line 2
"—" denotes a title that did not chart, or was not released in that territory.

=== As featured artist ===
List of singles as featured artist, with selected chart positions and certifications, showing year released and album name
Title	Year	Peak chart positions				Certifications	Album
Title	Year	US	US R&B	US Rap	NL	Certifications	Album
"Superwoman (Part 2)" (Lil' Mo featuring Fabolous)	2001	11	4	—	—		Based on a True Story
"Basketball" (Lil' Bow Wow featuring Jermaine Dupri, Fabolous and Fundisha)	2002	—	44	25	—		Like Mike (soundtrack)
"Automatic" (E-40 featuring Fabolous)	2002	—	72	—	—		Grit & Grind
"4Ever" (Lil' Mo featuring Fabolous)	2002	37	13	—	—		Meet the Girl Next Door
"Never Leave You (Uh Oooh Uh Oooh) (Remix)" (Lumidee featuring Busta Rhymes and Fabolous)	2003	—	—	—	—		Almost Famous
"Dip It Low" (Christina Milian featuring Fabolous)	2004	5	16	—	6	RIAA: Gold	It's About Time
"Badaboom" (B2K featuring Fabolous)	2004	59	29	—	62		You Got Served (soundtrack)
"Caught Up" (Remix) (Usher featuring Fabolous)	2005	—	—	—	—	RMNZ: Gold	Non-album single
"Hypnotic" (Syleena Johnson featuring R. Kelly and Fabolous)	2005	—	81	—	—		Chapter 3: The Flesh
"Dale Don Dale" (Remix) (Don Omar featuring Fabolous)	2005	—	89	—	—		Da Hitman Presents Reggaetón Latino
"Bad Girl" (Black Buddafly featuring Fabolous)	2006	—	— (Note: "Bad Girl" did not enter the Hot R&B/Hip Hop songs chart, but peaked at number one on the Bubbling Under R&B/Hip Hop Singles chart.)	—	—		Waist Deep (soundtrack)
"Shawty Is a 10" (The-Dream featuring Fabolous)	2007	17	6	—	—	RIAA: Gold	Love Hate
"Top of the Game" (Tony Parker featuring Booba and Fabolous)	2007	—	—	—	—		TP
"How Do I Breathe" (Remix) (Mario featuring Fabolous)	2007	—	—	—	—	RMNZ: Platinum	Non-album singles
"Finer Things" (DJ Felli Fel featuring Kanye West, Jermaine Dupri, Fabolous and Ne-Yo)	2008	— (Note: "Finer Things" did not enter the Billboard Hot 100, but peaked at number one on the Bubbling Under Hot 100 Singles chart.)	80	8	—		Non-album singles
"Hi Hater" (Remix) (Maino featuring T.I., Swizz Beatz, Plies, Jadakiss and Fabolous)	2008	—	—	—	—		Non-album singles
"Addiction" (Ryan Leslie featuring Cassie and Fabolous)	2008	— (Note: "Addiction" did not enter the Billboard Hot 100, but peaked at number 15 on the Bubbling Under Hot 100 Singles chart.)	35	—	—		Ryan Leslie
"I Can't Hear the Music" (Brutha featuring Fabolous)	2008	—	64	—	—		Brutha
"Good Lovin'" (Slim featuring Ryan Leslie and Fabolous)	2008	—	39	—	—		Love's Crazy
"She Got Her Own" (Jamie Foxx featuring Ne-Yo and Fabolous)	2008	54	2	—	—		Intuition
"Say Aah" (Trey Songz featuring Fabolous)	2009	9	3	—	—	RIAA: 2× Platinum	Ready
"More Than Love" (Amerie featuring Fabolous)	2009	—	—	—	—		In Love & War
"All I Do Is Win" (Remix) (DJ Khaled featuring Rick Ross, Busta Rhymes, Diddy, Nicki Minaj, Jadakiss, Fat Joe, Swizz Beatz and T-Pain)	2010	—	—	—	—		Non-album singles
"Baby I Like It" (Kevin Cossom featuring Diddy and Fabolous)	2010	—	—	—	—		Non-album singles
"Swagger Right" (RichGirl featuring Rick Ross and Fabolous)	2010	—	72	—	—		RichGirl
"I'm Ill" (Red Café featuring Fabolous)	2010	—	74	—	—		Non-album single
"Start It Up" (Lloyd Banks featuring Kanye West, Swizz Beatz, Ryan Leslie and Fabolous)	2010	— (Note: "Start It Up" did not enter the Billboard Hot 100, but peaked at number five on the Bubbling Under Hot 100 Singles chart.)	52	20	—		H.F.M. 2 (The Hunger for More)
"Oh My" (DJ Drama featuring Fabolous, Roscoe Dash and Wiz Khalifa)	2011	95	18	12	—		Third Power
"It Ain't Over Til It's Over" (DJ Khaled featuring Mary J. Blige, Fabolous and Jadakiss)	2011	—	52	—	—		We the Best Forever
"She Don't Put It Down" (Joe Budden featuring Tank, Fabolous and Lil Wayne)	2012	96	32	25	—		No Love Lost
"About That Life" (DJ Kay Slay featuring Fabolous, T-Pain, Rick Ross, Nelly and French Montana)	2013	—	— (Note: "About That Life" did not enter the Hot R&B/Hip Hop songs chart, but peaked at number four on the Bubbling Under R&B/Hip Hop Singles chart.)	—	—		Non-album single
"All That (Lady)" (The Game featuring Lil Wayne, Fabolous, Big Sean and Jeremih)	2013	—	48	—	—		Jesus Piece
"Slow It Down" (The-Dream featuring Fabolous)	2013	—	24	—	—		IV Play
"Know You Better" (Omarion featuring Pusha T and Fabolous)	2013	—	— (Note: "Know You Better" did not enter the Hot R&B/Hip Hop songs chart, but peaked at number four on the Bubbling Under R&B/Hip Hop Singles chart.)	—	—		Self Made Vol. 3
"Pretty Gang" (Red Cafe featuring Fabolous)	2014	—	—	—	—		ShakeDown
"Fly" (Jessica featuring Fabolous)	2016	—	—	—	—		With Love, J
"Flex" (Joe Budden featuring Tory Lanez and Fabolous)	2016	—	—	—	—		Rage and the Machine
"I'm On 3.0" (Trae tha Truth featuring T.I., Dave East, Tee Grizzley, Royce da 5'9", Curren$y, DRAM, Snoop Dogg, Fabolous, Rick Ross, Chamillionaire, G-Eazy, Styles P, E-40, Mark Morrison and Gary Clark Jr.)	2017	—	—	—	—		Tha Truth, Pt. 3
"Summer Body" (The-Dream featuring Fabolous)	2017	—	—	—	—		Love Affair
"Left, Right" (Casanova featuring Chris Brown and Fabolous)	2017	—	—	—	—		Commissary
"Try It" (Jay Critch featuring French Montana and Fabolous)	2018	—	—	—	—		Hood Favorite
"Spicy" (Lil' Kim featuring Fabolous)	2018	—	—	—	—		9
"Big Chain" (N.O.R.E. featuring Fabolous)	2018	—	—	—	—		5E
"Uptown Vibes" (Meek Mill featuring Fabolous and Anuel AA)	2018	39	17	15	—	RIAA: Gold	Championships
"So Brooklyn" (Casanova featuring Fabolous)	2019	—	—	—	—		Behind These Scars
"Act Bad" (Diddy featuring Fabolous and City Girls)	2023	—	—	—	—		Non-album single
"Breathing" (Mary J. Blige featuring Fabolous)	2024	—	—	—	—		Gratitude

=== Promotional singles ===
List of promotional singles, with selected chart positions, showing year released and album name
Title	Year	Peak chart positions	Album
Title	Year	US R&B	Album
"This Is My Party"	2003	59	Street Dreams
"Make U Mine" (featuring Mike Shorey)	2003	93	More Street Dreams, Pt. 2: The Mixtape
"Now Ride"	2003	—	More Street Dreams, Pt. 2: The Mixtape
"Tit 4 Tat"	2004	—	Real Talk
"Boogie Oogie Oogie" (Brooke Valentine featuring Yo-Yo and Fabolous)	2005	—	Roll Bounce
"Return of the Hustle" (featuring Swizz Beatz)	2007	— (Note: "Return of the Hustle" did not enter the Hot R&B/Hip Hop songs chart, but peaked at number 22 on the Bubbling Under R&B/Hip Hop Singles chart.)	From Nothin' to Somethin'
"Lights Out"	2010	92	There Is No Competition 2: The Grieving Music EP
"The Walls" (Mario featuring Fabolous)	2011	58	Evolve
"What I Be On" (Trey Songz featuring Fabolous)	2011	79	Inevitable
"Rapture" (with Jadakiss featuring Tory Lanez)	2017	—	—N/a

== Other charted songs ==
List of songs, with selected chart positions, showing year and album name
Title	Year	Peak chart positions		Album
Title	Year	US	US R&B	Album
"Tameeka" (with Mario)	2001	—	68	Dr. Dolittle 2 (soundtrack)
"Damn"	2003	—	69	Street Dreams
"You Ain't Got Nuthin" (Lil Wayne featuring Fabolous and Juelz Santana)	2008	81	—	Tha Carter III
"Body Ya"	2010	—	75	There Is No Competition 2: The Grieving Music EP
"Crazy Love" (Ne-Yo featuring Fabolous)	2011	—	72	Libra Scale
"Should Be You" (Ne-Yo featuring Fabolous and Diddy)	2012	—	— (Note: "Should Be You" did not enter the Hot R&B/Hip Hop songs chart, but peaked at number nine on the Bubbling Under R&B/Hip Hop Singles chart.)	R.E.D.
"Don't Shoot" (The Game featuring Rick Ross, 2 Chainz, Diddy, Fabolous, Wale, DJ Khaled, Swizz Beatz, Yo Gotti, Currensy, Problem, King Pharoah and TGT)	2014	—	— (Note: "Don't Shoot" did not enter the Hot R&B/Hip Hop songs chart, but peaked at number three on the Bubbling Under R&B/Hip Hop Singles chart.)	Non-album single
"Doin It Well" (featuring Trey Songz and Nicki Minaj)	2015	118	51	Summertime Shootout

== Guest appearances ==
List of non-single guest appearances, with other performing artists, showing year released and album name
Title	Year	Other artist(s)	Album
"That's the Way"	1998	DJ Clue?, Foxy Brown, Mase	The Professional
"If They Want It"	1998	DJ Clue?	The Professional
"Vivrant Thing (Violator Remix)"	1999	Q-Tip, Captain, Da Franchise, Sonya Blade	—N/a
"Fantastic Four Pt. 2"	2001	DJ Clue?, The Lox, Nature	The Professional 2
"Sponsor" (DJ Clue mix)	2001	Canela Cox	Canela
"Cross the Border (J.B. Remix)"	2001	Philly's Most Wanted	Get Down or Lay Down
"She's All I Got (Remix)"	2001	Jimmy Cozier	Jimmy Cozier
"Last Night a DJ Saved My Life"	2001	Mariah Carey, Busta Rhymes, DJ Clue?	Glitter
"We Be Like This"	2002	Jadakiss, Danny Saber	Blade II (soundtrack)
"How We Do?"	2002	Trina	Diamond Princess
"Comedy Central"	2002	Clipse	Lord Willin'
"Act Like You Know Me"	2002	Shade Sheist, Knoc-turn'al	Informal Introduction
"BK to CPT"	2002	The Game	You Know What It Is, Vol. 1
"Why Wouldn't I?" "Grand Theft Audio"	2003	DJ Envy, Paul Cain, Joe Budden	The Desert Storm Mixtape: Blok Party, Vol. 1
"Blao! (OG Mix)"	2003	Hot Karl, DJ Clue & Redman	I Like to Read!
"U-Turn"	2003	Brian McKnight, Sir John	U-Turn
"Is This Our Last Time?"	2003	Missy Elliott	This Is Not a Test!
"Bling Blaow"	2005	Red Café	The Supplier
"6 Minutes"	2005	Cassidy, Lil Wayne	I'm a Hustla
"Kiss Your Ass Goodbye (Remix)"	2005	Sheek Louch, T.I., Jadakiss, Beanie Sigel	After Taxes
"One Wish (Remix)"	2005	Ray J	—N/a
"Fly Away"	2005	Miri Ben-Ari, Musiq, Kanye West	The Hip-Hop Violinist
"Is It Good to You (Remix)"	2006	Yummy Bingham, Red Café	—N/a
"One Blood" (Remix)	2006	The Game, Jim Jones, Snoop Dogg, Nas, T.I., Fat Joe, Lil Wayne, N.O.R.E., Jadakiss, Styles P, Juelz Santana, Rick Ross, Twista, Kurupt, Daz Dillinger, WC, E-40, Bun B, Chamillionaire, Slim Thug, Young Dro, Clipse, Ja Rule, Junior Reid	none
"I Really Wanna Know You"	2006	DJ Clue?, Jagged Edge	The Professional 3
"Like This"	2006	DJ Clue?, Kanye West	The Professional 3
"Da Boss"	2006	DJ Clue?	The Professional 3
"Jeep Shit"	2006	Red Café, Paul Wall	The Arm and Hammer Man
"So Excited" (Remix)	2006	Janet Jackson, Fatman Scoop, Khia, Jermaine Dupri	none
"Get Me Bodied (Timbaland Remix)"	2007	Beyoncé	B'Day {Deluxe Thai Editions}
"That's What You Are (Remix)"	2007	Amerie, Slim Thug	—N/a
"Let Him Go"	2007	Bobby V	Special Occasion
"Let's Just Do It"	2007	Joe	Ain't Nothin' Like Me
"Running Your Mouth"	2007	The Notorious B.I.G., Busta Rhymes, Foxy Brown, Snoop Dogg, Nate Dogg	Greatest Hits
"Go Ahead"	2008	DJ Khaled, Rick Ross, Flo Rida, Fat Joe, Lloyd	We Global
"You Got Me" (Remix)	2008	One Block Radius, Baby Bash	none
"Break the Ice" (Remix)	2008	Britney Spears	none
"Feedback" (So So Def Remix)	2008	Janet Jackson, Busta Rhymes, Ciara	—N/a
"I'm da Man" (Remix)	2008	Red Café, Fred Wrek, Paul Cain	Paper Touchin'
"Dope Boyz"	2008	Red Café	Eviction Notice
"Sweat"	2009	DJ Drama, Ray J, La the Darkman	Gangsta Grillz: The Album (Vol. 2)
"Some Gangster Shit"	2009	The Alchemist	Chemical Warfare
"Maybach Music 2.5"	2009	Rick Ross, T-Pain, Pusha T, Birdman, DJ Khaled	Deeper Than Rap
"Guest House"	2009	Ghostface Killah	Ghostdini: Wizard of Poetry in Emerald City
"Watchin' Me"	2009	Slick Pulla	Election Day
"White Girl" (Remix)	2009	Slick Pulla, U.S.D.A., Lil Wayne, Rick Ross	Election Day
"Cakes"	2010	RydazNRtist	RydazNRtist
"Tangerine (Gentleman's Club Remix)"	2010	Big Boi, Rick Ross, Bun B	—N/a
"Big Ol Butt"	2010	Jamie Drastik	The Magnet
"5 Seconds"	2010	El Debarge	Second Chance
" Deuces" (Remix)	2010	Chris Brown, Drake, T.I., Kanye West, Rick Ross, André 3000	—N/a
"Don't Believe Y'all Niggas"	2010	Cam'ron & Vado	Salute
"Look Like"	2010	Plies, Young Jeezy	Goon Affiliated
"Come Till My Girl Come"	2010	Sean Garrett	The Inkwell
"Make Some Noise"	2010	Sheek Louch	Donnie G: Don Gorilla
"Bottles & Rockin' J's"	2011	DJ Khaled, Game, Busta Rhymes, Rick Ross, Lil Wayne	We the Best Forever
"The Money"	2011	DJ Pharris, R. Kelly, Fat Joe, Busta Rhymes	Hood Radio
"Ferrari Lifestyle"	2011	Game	Purp & Patron
"Whip It"	2011	Game, Rick Ross	Purp & Patron
"OJ"	2011	Young Jeezy, Jadakiss	Thug Motivation 103: Hustlerz Ambition
"Flexin"	2011	Young Jeezy Yo Gotti	The Real Is Back
"Rollin"	2011	Young Jeezy	The Real Is Back
"The Realest"	2011	Red Café, Lloyd Banks	Above the Cloudz
"Death Penalty"	2012	Game, Eric Bellinger, Slim Thug	California Republic
"Bottles 'N Rockin' J's" (Remix)	2012	Game, DJ Khaled, Busta Rhymes, Rick Ross, Lil Wayne, Teyana Taylor	California Republic
"Rack City" (Remix)	2012	Tyga, Wale, Meek Mill, Young Jeezy, T.I.	none
"D.U.I."	2012	Teyana Taylor, Jadakiss	The Misunderstanding of Teyana Taylor
"Respect It"	2012	Jadakiss, Lloyd Banks	Consignment
"Racked Up Shawty"	2012	Meek Mill, French Montana	Dreamchasers 2
"House Party" (Remix)	2012	Meek Mill, Wale, Mac Miller	Dreamchasers 2
"Don't Make Sense"	2012	Gucci Mane, 8Ball	I'm Up
"Merlot Pt.Deux"	2012	Troy Ave, Mila Brown	Bricks In My Backpack 3: The Harry Powder Trilogy
"Ahh Shit"	2012	Jeremih	Late Nights with Jeremih
"Bring It Back"	2012	Lloyd Banks	V.6: The Gift
"Unfuckwitable"	2012	Red Café	Hells Kitchen
"Salute 100 Ya'll"	2012	Akon, Money J	Konkrete Jungle
"Goin' Down"	2012	DJ Drama, T-Pain, Yo Gotti	Quality Street Music
"Beautiful Lie" (Remix)	2012	Ryan Leslie	Les Is More
"Dance Move"	2012	French Montana, Wale	Mac & Cheese 3
"Fully Loaded"	2012	Red Café, Trey Songz	American Psycho
"Gucci Everything"	2012	Red Café, Chief Keef, Game, French Montana	American Psycho
"Same Party"	2012	Red Café, King Los	American Psycho
"I'm Not a Rapper" (Remix)	2013	Sky Balla, Freck Billionaire	none
"Representin" (Remix)	2013	Ludacris, R. Kelly	none
"Soft"	2013	Juelz Santana, Rick Ross, Meek Mill	God Will'n
"She Don't Put It Down" (Remix)	2013	Joe Budden, Twista, Tank	No Love Lost
"I'm So Fucked Up"	2013	RaVaughn	none
"Boss Bitches & Fast Cars"	2013	Red Café, Pusha T	American Psycho 2
"I Love It"	2013	Cassie	RockaByeBaby
"40"	2013	French Montana, Trey Songz	Excuse My French
"The Way" (Remix)	2013	Ariana Grande	none
"FOH"	2013	DJ Prostyle, French Montana	none
"This Shit Is Lit" (Remix)	2013	SBOE, Meek Mill	none
"Straight for the Summer"	2013	Vado, Kirko Bangz	Slime Flu 4
"The Great Americans"	2013	Rick Ross, Gunplay, Rockie Fresh	Self Made Vol. 3
"My Chick Better"	2013	Nelly, Wiz Khalifa	M.O.
"I B on Dat"	2013	Meek Mill, Nicki Minaj, French Montana	Dreamchasers 3
"Money Ain't No Issue"	2013	Meek Mill, Future	Dreamchasers 3
"Maniac"	2013	Tyga	Well Done 4
"Action"	2014	Red Cafe, Kevin Cossom	American Psycho II
"B B F C"	2014	Red Cafe, Pusha T	American Psycho II
"Grind & Pray/Get Ya Money"	2014	August Alsina	Testimony
"Yayo" (Remix)	2014	Snootie Wild, Jadakiss, YG, French Montana	Chapter One
"Money ($ * / ...)"	2014	Mariah Carey	Me. I Am Mariah... The Elusive Chanteuse
"Broken Hearted Girl"	2014	Teyana Taylor	VII (Teyana Taylor album)
"Don't Shoot"	2014	The Game, Rick Ross, 2 Chainz, Diddy, Wale, DJ Khaled, Swizz Beatz, Yo Gotti, Currensy, Problem, King Pharoah, TGT	none
"Hot Nigga" (Remix)	2014	Bobby Shmurda, Jadakiss, Chris Brown, Rowdy Rebel, Busta Rhymes, Yo Gotti	none
"Hold You Down" (Remix)	2014	DJ Khaled, Usher, Rick Ross, Ace Hood	none
"Pretty Gang 2"	2014	Red Cafe, Jeremih, Tank	In Us We Trust
"She Knows" (Remix)	2015	Ne-Yo, French Montana, Juicy J	none
"Bad Bitch" (Remix)	2015	French Montana, Jeremih, Rick Ross	Casino Life 2: Brown Bag Legend
"On the Dot"	2015	Jamie Foxx	Hollywood: A Story of a Dozen Roses
"Do Me No Favors"	2015	Troy Ave, Jadakiss	Major Without A Deal
"Still Here"	2015	Red Café	none
"Don't Mind"	2016	A$AP Ferg, French Montana	Always Strive and Prosper
"Every Time"	2016	Ameriie	Drive
"Don't Ever Play Yourself"	2016	DJ Khaled, Jadakiss, Fat Joe, Busta Rhymes, Kent Jones	Major Key
"Wishing (Remix)"	2016	DJ Drama, Chris Brown, Tory Lanez, Jhene Aiko, Trey Songz	—N/a
"Eyes on Me"	2016	Dave East	Kairi Chanel
"Connection"	2018	Tory Lanez, Davo, Paloma Ford	Memories Don't Die
"Jackpot"	2018	Red Cafe, Fetty Wap	Less Talk More Hustle
"Playoffs"	2018	Red Cafe	Less Talk More Hustle
"Forfeit"	2018	A1	—N/a
"Levelin Up"	2018	Dave East	Karma 2
"Don't Say Shit"	2018	Trey Songz, Chris Brown	28
"What's Goin On"	2019	Dave East	Survival
"If You Gotta..."	2019	Tory Lanez	Chixtape 5
"Nothing Lasts"	2019	Jim Jones, Marc Scibilia	EL Capo
"Still Can't Love"	2020	Joyner Lucas, King OSF	ADHD
"Didn't Get Far"	2021	French Montana	They Got Amnesia
"Oooh Trifflin'"	2022	Tink	Pillow Talk
"Brooklyn Chophouse"	2023	Conway the Machine, Benny the Butcher	Won't He Do It
"Flyest in the City"	2023	King Combs, A Boogie wit da Hoodie, Jeremih	C3
"Pick Up"	2023	Diddy, Jacquees	The Love Album: Off the Grid
"PPA"	2023	Lil Wayne, 2 Chainz	Welcome 2 Collegrove
"Dead Last"	2023	Rick Ross, Meek Mill, Vory	Too Good To Be True
"To the Moon"	2024	French Montana, Fivio Foreign	Non-album single
"Buss Down"	2024	AraabMuzik, Dave East	Living Proof
