= There Is No Competition 2: The Grieving Music EP =

There Is No Competition 2: The Grieving Music

Mixtape by Fabolous
- Released: August 31, 2010
- Recorded: 2009–2010
- Genre: Hip hop
- Length: 29:37
- Labels: Desert Storm, Street Family, Def Jam
- Producers: I.N.F.O., Amadeus, Sonaro, Ryan Leslie, Jahlil Beats, Lex Luger, Nova, Scott Mescudi

Fabolous chronology
Loso's Way (2009)	There Is No Competition 2: The Grieving Music (2010)	The Young OG Project (2014)

Singles from There Is No Competition 2: The Grieving Music EP
- 1. "You Be Killin' Em" Released: November 23, 2010

There Is No Competition 2: The Grieving Music EP is an EP by American rapper Fabolous. The EP was released on August 31, 2010.

== Background ==
The EP was released in promotion for his sixth studio album, Loso's Way 2: Rise to Power. The EP is the retail packaging of his mixtape There Is No Competition 2: The Funeral Service. Fabolous stated he went into the studio to record new material for the EP.

== Track listing ==
No.	Title	Writer(s)	Producer(s)	Length
1.	"The Eulogy (Intro)"			1:18
2.	"The Wake"	John Jackson; John Christopher	I.N.F.O.	3:12
3.	"I'm Raw"	Jackson; Antwan Thompson	Antwan "Amadeus" Thompson	3:00
4.	"Body Ya"	Jackson; Christopher Breland	Sonaro	3:08
5.	"Body Count"	Jackson; Breland	Sonaro	3:11
6.	"Body Bag (Remix)" (featuring Cam'ron & Vado)	Jackson; Christopher; Scott Novelli; Cameron Giles; Teyon Winfree	I.N.F.O.; Nova	4:49
7.	"You Be Killin Em"	Jackson; Ryan Leslie; Herb Rooney	Ryan Leslie	3:29
8.	"Tonight" (featuring Red Café)	Jackson; Orlando Tucker; Jermaine Denny	Jahlil Beats	3:15
9.	"Lights Out"	Jackson; Lexus Lewis; Shawn Carter; Kasseem Dean	Lex Luger	3:30
10.	"Closing Prayer (Outro)"			0:46

Sample credits

- "You Be Killin' Em" contains excerpts from "Synthetic Substitution", written by Herb Rooney.
- "Lights Out" contains elements of "Jigga My Nigga", written by Shawn Carter and Kasseem Dean.

Professional ratings
Review scores
Source	Rating
Allmusic	3.5/5 stars

== Charts ==
Chart (2010)	Peak position
US Billboard 200	32
US Billboard Top R&B/Hip-Hop Albums	9
US Billboard Top Rap Albums	4
