= The Desert Storm Mixtape: Blok Party, Vol. 1 =

The Desert Storm Mixtape: Blok Party Vol. 1

Studio album by DJ Envy
- Released: February 11, 2003
- Recorded: 2002
- Genre: Hip hop
- Length: 63:13
- Label: Desert Storm; Epic
- Producer: Skane (exec.); DJ Clue? (also exec.); Ken "Duro" Ifill (also exec.); DJ Envy (also co-exec.); Black Jeruz; China Black; Dame Grease; Erick Sermon; Liveson; Mono; Omen; Quan Entertainment; Rockwilder; Self; Waiel "Wally" Yaghnam; White Boy; Zukhan

Professional ratings
Review scores
Source	Rating
AllMusic	3/5 stars
HipHopDX	2.5/5

The Desert Storm Mixtape: Blok Party Vol. 1 is the debut studio album by American disc jockey and record producer DJ Envy. It was released on February 11, 2003, through Desert Storm Records and Epic Records. Production was handled by DJ Clue?, Erick Sermon, Ken Duro Ifill, Mono, Black Jeruz, China Black, Dame Grease, Jared Liveson, Omen, Quan Entertainment, Rockwilder, Self, Waiel "Wally" Yaghnam, White Boy, Zukhan and DJ Envy himself. It features guest appearances from Birdman, Coke, Fabolous, Joe Budden, Paul Cane, The Lox, 3LW, Busta Rhymes, DMX, Geda K, Ja Rule, Jay-Z, J Hood, Juvenile, Lil' Mo, Lloyd Banks, Murphy Lee, Petey Pablo, Kia Jeffries, Rah Digga, Redman and Vita among others. The album peaked at number 57 on the Billboard 200 and at number 8 on the Top R&B/Hip-Hop Albums, selling 69,000 copies in the first week.

== Track listing ==
No.	Title	Writer(s)	Producer(s)	Length
1.	"Clue Intro" (featuring DJ Clue?)		DJ Envy	0:16
2.	"H.O.V.A." (featuring Jay-Z)	Shawn Carter; Edward Hinson	Self	2:52
3.	"What, Why, Where, When" (featuring Styles P)	David Styles; Erick Sermon	Erick Sermon	3:15
4.	"Why Wouldn't I" (featuring Fabolous and Paul Cain)	John Jackson; Paul Cane; Sidney Brown	Omen	4:38
5.	"D Block" (featuring The Lox and J. Hood)	Sean Jacobs; Jason Phillips; Styles; Kiyamma Griffin; Joshua Hood; Jared Liveson	Liveson	3:20
6.	"What Goes Around" (featuring Lloyd Banks and 50 Cent)	Curtis Jackson; Christopher Lloyd; Robert Smith; Sean Collins; Derick Prosper	Black Jeruz	4:00
7.	"Jamie Fox Interlude" (featuring Jamie Foxx)		DJ Envy	0:34
8.	"So Vicious" (featuring Redman)	Reginald Noble; Sermon; Brodie Williams	Erick Sermon	3:06
9.	"2 Ill" (featuring Foxy Brown, Loon, Coke and X.O.)	Inga Marchand; B. Grimsley; Raashaun Casey; Renan Thybulle	DJ Envy; Mono	3:54
10.	"Throw Your Shit Up" (featuring Busta Rhymes and Rah Digga)	Trevor Smith; Rashia Fisher; Dana Stinson	Rockwilder	4:08
11.	"The Birdman" (featuring Baby)		DJ Envy	0:31
12.	"Big Things" (featuring Baby, Mikkey and Stone)	Bryan Williams; Mikkel Nance; Alvin Nelson; Janette Sewell; Timothy Hom	China Black	4:02
13.	"Yes Sir" (featuring Petey Pablo, Juvenile and Coke)	Moses Barrett III; Terius Gray; Casey; Thybulle	DJ Envy; Mono	3:13
14.	"Jungle Gym" (featuring Murphy Lee)	Torhi Harper; Waiel Yaghnam	Waiel "Wally" Yaghnam	3:23
15.	"Focus" (featuring Joe Budden)	Joseph Budden; Joseph Kuleszynski	White Boy	3:42
16.	"Deeper" (featuring DMX)	Earl Simmons; Damon Blackman; Barry White	Dame Grease	3:21
17.	"We Fly" (featuring Ja Rule, Lil' Mo and Vita)	Jeffrey Atkins; LaVita Raynor; Cynthia Loving; Ernesto Shaw; Ken Ifill	DJ Clue?; Ken "Duro" Ifill	4:17
18.	"Can I Talk 2 U" (featuring 3LW)	Griffin; Floyd Howard; Donald DeGrate Jr.	Quan Entertainment	3:07
19.	"Grand Theft Audio" (featuring Fabolous, Paul Cain and Joe Budden)	J. Jackson; Cane; Budden; Shaw; Ifill	DJ Clue?; Ken "Duro" Ifill	3:07
20.	"Stephon Marbury Drop" (featuring Stephon Marbury)		DJ Envy	0:44
21.	"Brooklyn" (featuring Memphis Bleek, Geda K and Kia Jeffries)	Malik Cox; Gary Grainger; Zukhan Bey; Carlos D. Wilson; Louis W. Wilson; Ricardo A. Wilson	Zukhan	3:43
Total length:				63:13

== Charts ==
Chart (2003)	Peak position
US Billboard 200	57
US Top R&B/Hip-Hop Albums (Billboard)	8
