= You Be Killin Em =

Single by Fabolous

from the album There Is No Competition 2: The Grieving Music EP
- Released: November 23, 2010
- Studio: Tainted Blue Studio, New York City
- Genre: Hip hop
- Length: 3:29
- Label: Desert Storm; Def Jam
- Songwriters: John Jackson; Ryan Leslie; Scott Mescudi; Herbert Rooney
- Producers: Ryan Leslie; Kid Cudi

Fabolous singles chronology
"Start It Up" (2010)	"You Be Killin Em" (2010)	"Oh My" (2011)

"You Be Killin Em" is a song by American rapper Fabolous, released by Def Jam Recordings on November 23, 2010 as the first single from his debut extended play There Is No Competition 2: The Grieving Music EP (2010). It was recorded at Tainted Blue Studio, NYC, by Widens Pkolo Dorsainville. Production was handled by American singer Ryan Leslie, with alleged involvement from American rapper Kid Cudi.

== Background ==
The production for "You Be Killin Em" was originally composed by Ryan Leslie for singer Adrienne Bailon, after music executive Lenny Santiago – Bailon's boyfriend at the time – managed to arrange them recording sessions together. She had intended to use it for a song on her debut album Unapologetic; however, the album was ultimately never released. During a 2019 episode of talk show The Real, Bailon claimed she had taken too long to find suitable ghostwriters for her vocals and that as a result, Santiago decided to offer the production to Fabolous instead.

Rapper Kid Cudi also claims to have been involved in the creation of "You Be Killin Em"; his name is not listed in the official production credits. In an appearance on the podcast Drink Champs, Fabolous alleged that Kid Cudi had contacted him to insist he unofficially assisted Leslie in creating the song's production, whilst also demanding payment for his work. Unaware of any problem, Fabolous suggested to Kid Cudi that he raise the issue with Leslie directly.

== Music video ==
The music video was filmed in November 2010; directed by Aristotle (By Any Means LLC). Model Amber Rose makes an appearance in the video as well as Ryan Leslie. The video was shot in black-and-white. The video shows with a gunshot view of a woman surrounding two black men.

== Remix ==
The song was officially remixed, titled "Look at Her (Killin 'Em Pt. 2)". The remix features a new verse from Fabolous, as well as new vocals from American singers Ne-Yo and Ryan Leslie, the latter of whom also contributed new production to the song. The remix is listed as the fourteenth and final track of Fabolous's fifth mixtape The S.O.U.L. Tape (2011).

== Charts ==
=== Weekly charts ===
Chart (2010–2011)	Peak position
US Billboard Hot 100	63
US Hot R&B/Hip-Hop Songs (Billboard)	8
US Hot Rap Songs (Billboard)	6
US Rhythmic Airplay (Billboard)	27

=== Year-end charts ===
Chart (2011)	Position
US Hot R&B/Hip-Hop Songs (Billboard)	37

== Certifications ==
Region	Certification	Certified units/sales
United States (RIAA)	Gold	500,000^{*}
^{*} Sales figures based on certification alone.

== Release history ==
Region	Date	Format(s)	Label	Ref.
United States	November 23, 2010	Rhythmic contemporary radio	Desert Storm, Def Jam, IDJMG	
