= Widens Pkolo Dorsainville =

Haitian producer, actor (born 1987)

Pkolo
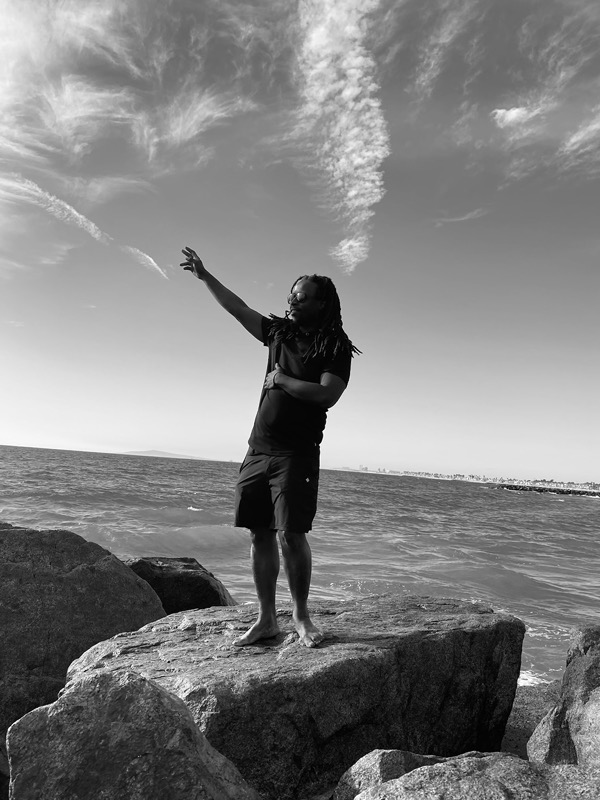
- Born: Widens Dorsainville; 1987 (age 38–39); Pétion-Ville, Haiti
- Occupations: Producer, actor
- Years active: 2010–2026

Widens Dorsainville, known professionally as Pkolo is a Haitian producer, actor and composer record executive and artist. His production work includes the movie A United Kingdom and the TV shows House Hunters and Bitchin' Rides.

== Early life ==
Dorsainville developed an interest in music production during his time at Elizabeth High School class, where he experimented with creating beats, singing, and rapping. Following high school, he collaborated with his brother and others to establish a local recording studio, where he worked on music projects and collaborated with artists including Foushee and Kanis.

In 2010, Dorsainville received a call from the studio call Tainted Blue Studio located in Times Square, Manhattan to work on the song You Be Killin Em with Fabolous where he contributed as an engineer and co-producer on three tracks for Fabolous’s mixtape "rIP to the competition.'

== Music career ==
Dorsainville has worked in music production and composition, contributing to various projects in television and film. He has received industry certifications including gold certifications for his work.

He later signed a composer agreement with APM Music in Hollywood, Los Angeles, where he contributed music for television and media productions.

In interviews, he has discussed his approach to music and creative development. He has described his work as developing a contemporary hip-hop style derived from traditional hip-hop influences.

In 2021, he appeared on a last single of Snootie Wild before his death.

== Awards ==
Association	Year	Category	Nominated work	Result
Leo Awards	2017	Best Musical Score in a Short Drama	Ice (American TV series)	Nominated
National Film Awards UK	2017	best producer – drama	A United Kingdom	Won
Black Reel Awards	2017	Best song	A United Kingdom	Won
London Film Critics' Circle	2017	Film of the year	A United Kingdom	Won

== Filmography ==
=== TV and Film ===
Year	Title	Role	Notes
2025	Renovation Aloha	Composer	
2024	Famous For Nothing	actor	
2023	life of a zoe	actor	
2023	House Hunters	producer	
2022	Bitchin' Rides	producer	
2016	A United Kingdom	producer	

== Charts ==
=== Weekly charts ===
Chart (2010–2011)	Peak position
US Billboard Hot 100	63
US Hot R&B/Hip-Hop Songs (Billboard)	8
US Hot Rap Songs (Billboard)	6
US Rhythmic Airplay (Billboard)	27

=== Year-end charts ===
Chart (2011)	Position
US Hot R&B/Hip-Hop Songs (Billboard)	37

== Certifications ==
Region	Certification	Certified units/sales
United States (RIAA)	Gold	500,000^{*}
^{*} Sales figures based on certification alone.

== Release history ==
Region	Date	Format(s)	Label	Ref.
United States	November 23, 2010	Rhythmic contemporary radio	Desert Storm, Def Jam, IDJMG	
