= Ready (Fabolous song) =

Single by Fabolous featuring Chris Brown
- Released: January 17, 2013
- Recorded: 2012
- Genre: Hip hop; R&B
- Length: 3:59
- Label: Desert Storm; Def Jam
- Songwriters: John Jackson; Chris Brown; Andrew Harr; Jermaine Jackson; Andre Davidson; Sean Davidson
- Producers: The Runners; The Monarch

Fabolous singles chronology
"All That (Lady)" (2013)	"Ready" (2013)	"When I Feel Like It" (2013)

Chris Brown singles chronology
"Celebration" (2012)	"Ready" (2013)	"As Your Friend" (2013)

Music video
- "Ready" on YouTube

"Ready" is a song by American rapper Fabolous, released as a single by Def Jam Recordings and Desert Storm Records on January 17, 2013. It features American singer Chris Brown, and was produced by The Runners and The Monarch. The song was intended to lead his then-forthcoming album, Loso's Way 2: Rise to Power; however, it only peaked at number 93 on the US Billboard Hot 100 and the album remains unreleased.

== Background ==
"Ready" was recorded by Fabolous and singer Chris Brown in early 2012, over a year before its eventual release. Fabolous explained this was due to Brown's altercation with former girlfriend Rihanna, he explained that he did not want the record to get caught up in the negativity of the situation. On January 15, 2013, Fabolous announced that the first official single from Loso's Way 2 would be "Ready". He described the song as a great radio record that can be very successful. Fabolous enlisted Brown to perform the hook and bridge, feeling that he was best suited to do so.

The song remains a standalone non-album single, as Loso's Way 2 was never released.

== Music video ==
On March 9, 2013, Fabolous and Chris Brown were in Malibu, California shooting the first part of the video and the second part of the video would be shot in the Dominican Republic. The music video was filmed by TAJ. On March 26 the first trailer was released featuring a cameo from Kevin Hart and on April 8 the second trailer featuring scenes shot in the Dominican Republic was released. The music video labeled a short film premiered on BET's 106 & Park on April 10, 2013. It features a cameo from Jessica White as Fabolous' love interest.

== Chart performance ==
=== Weekly charts ===
Chart (2013)	Peak position
US Billboard Hot 100	93
US Hot R&B/Hip-Hop Songs (Billboard)	28
US R&B/Hip-Hop Airplay (Billboard)	14

=== Year-end charts ===
Chart (2013)	Position
US Hot R&B/Hip-Hop Songs (Billboard)	84

== Certifications ==
Region	Certification	Certified units/sales
United States (RIAA)	Gold	500,000^{‡}
^{‡} Sales+streaming figures based on certification alone.
