= When I Feel Like It =

Single by Fabolous featuring 2 Chainz
- Released: July 9, 2013
- Recorded: 2013
- Genre: Hip-hop
- Length: 3:59
- Label: Desert Storm, Def Jam
- Songwriters: John Jackson, Tauheed Epps, David Lewis Doman, Zachary Seman
- Producer: David D.A. Doman

Fabolous singles chronology
"Ready" (2013)	"When I Feel Like It" (2013)	"Don't Shoot" (2014)

2 Chainz singles chronology
"Trampoline" (2013)	"When I Feel Like It" (2013)	"My Story" (2013)

"When I Feel Like It" is a song by American rapper Fabolous featuring fellow American rapper 2 Chainz. The song was released as a single on July 9, 2013 and was produced by David D.A. Doman. The song has peaked at number five on the US Billboard Bubbling Under R&B/Hip-Hop Singles chart.

== Background ==
On May 31, 2013, Fabolous premiered "When I Feel Like It" featuring 2 Chainz, via his SoundCloud. It was produced by David D.A. Doman, and was revealed to be the next single from his sixth studio album Loso's Way 2: Rise to Power. It would officially receive a retail release to iTunes as the album's second single on July 9, 2013.

== Music video ==
On July 24, 2013 Fabolous and 2 Chainz shot the music video for "When I Feel Like It", at La Marina Beach in New York City. Five days later they released the behind the scenes footage of the shoot. Cameo appearances in the video come from rappers French Montana, Meek Mill, Trina, Ace Hood, Vado, and DJ Khaled among others. The music video was released on September 11, 2013.

== Chart performance ==
Chart (2013)	Peak position
US Bubbling Under R&B/Hip-Hop Singles (Billboard)	5

== Release history ==
Country	Date	Format	Label
United States	July 9, 2013	Digital download	Desert Storm, Def Jam
United States	August 2013	Urban contemporary radio	Desert Storm, Def Jam
