= The Professional (album) =

Studio album by DJ Clue?
- Released: December 15, 1998
- Studios: Alien Flyers (New York City); Platinum Island (New York City); Desert Storm (New York City); Soundtrack (New York City); The Hit Factory (New York City); Krosswire (Atlanta); Sound On Sound (New York City); Source (Canton, Massachusetts); D&D Studios (New York City)
- Genre: Hardcore hip-hop
- Length: 1:14:00
- Labels: Roc-A-Fella; Def Jam; Desert Storm; PolyGram
- Producers: DJ Clue? (also exec.); DURO (also exec.); Buckwild; DJ Scratch; Hangmen 3; Laze-E-Laze; M.O.P.; Self; Swizz Beatz; V.I.C.

DJ Clue? chronology
The Professional (1998)	DJ Clue? Presents: Backstage Mixtape (2000)

Professional ratings
Review scores
Source	Rating
AllMusic	2/5 stars
Robert Christgau	(dud)
Rolling Stone	3/5 stars

The Professional is the debut studio album by American record producer DJ Clue?. It was released on December 15, 1998, via Polygram Records, Def Jam Recordings, DJ Clue's Desert Storm Records and Jay-Z's Roc-A-Fella Records.

Recording sessions took place at Alien Flyers, at Platinum Island Studios, at Desert Storm Studios, at Soundtrack Studios, at The Hit Factory, at Sound On Sound Studios and at D&D Studios in New York City, at Krosswire Studios in Atlanta, and at Source Sound Labs in Canton, Massachusetts. Production was handled by Ifill, Buckwild, DJ Scratch, Hangmen 3, Laze-E-Laze, M.O.P., Self, V.I.C., Swizz Beatz and Clue himself.

It features guest appearances from DMX, Fabolous, Big Noyd, Big Pun, Boot Camp Clik, Cam'ron, Canibus, Drag-On, EPMD, Eve, Flipmode Squad, Foxy Brown, Ja Rule, Jadakiss, Jay-Z, Jermaine Dupri, Keith Murray, Lord Tariq, Made Men, Mase, Memphis Bleek, Missy "Misdemeanor" Elliott, Mobb Deep, Mocha, M.O.P., Nas, Nature, Nicole Wray, N.O.R.E., Puff Daddy, Raekwon, Redman, R.O.C. and Styles P.

Its sequels, The Professional 2 and The Professional 3, were released in 2001 and 2006, respectively.

== Commercial performance ==
The album sold 140,000 copies in its first week, debuting and peaking at number twenty-six on the Billboard 200 chart, and number three on the Top R&B/Hip-Hop Albums chart. It has been certified gold by the Recording Industry Association of America on January 27, 1999, and then went platinum on August 20, 2001, indicating US sales of over one million units.

== Track listing ==
All tracks are produced by DJ Clue and DURO, except where noted.

No.	Title	Writer(s)	Producer	Length
1.	"Intro" (featuring Sean "Puffy" Combs)			1:02
2.	"Ruff Ryders' Anthem (Remix)" (featuring DMX, Jadakiss, Styles, Drag-On and Eve)	Jason Phillips; David Styles; Melvin Jason Smalls; Ernesto Shaw; Ken Ifill; Earl Simmons; Kasseem Dean; Eve Jeffers	Swizz Beatz; DURO (rmx)	3:52
3.	"It's On" (featuring DMX)	Simmons; Shaw; Ifill; Johnnie Wilder Jr.		3:25
4.	"Fantastic 4" (featuring Cam'ron, Big Pun, Noreaga and Canibus)	Cameron Giles; Christopher Rios; Victor Santiago; Shaw; Ifill; Germaine Williams; Tony Romeo		5:09
5.	"Queensfinest" (featuring Nas)	Nasir Jones; Edward Hinson; Shaw; Ifill	Self	3:26
6.	"Exclusive-New Shit" (featuring Nature)	Jermain Baxter; Bob James; Shaw; Ifill		3:08
7.	"Gangsta Shit" (featuring Jay-Z and Ja Rule)	Shawn Carter; Jeffrey Atkins; Shaw; Ifill; Thom Bell; Linda Creed		4:38
8.	"Thugged Out Shit" (featuring Memphis Bleek)	Malik Cox; Shaw; Ifill		3:54
9.	"It's My Thang '99" (featuring EPMD, Redman and Keith Murray)	Erick Sermon; Reggie Noble; Keith Murray; Parrish Smith; Shaw; Ifill		3:00
10.	"Mariah Carey (Skit)"			0:21
11.	"Whatever You Want" (featuring Flipmode Squad)	George Spivey; Trevor Smith; Roger McNair; William Lewis; Rashia Fisher; Leroy Jones; Wayne Notise; Yvette Marie Stevens; Ray Parker Jr.	DJ Scratch	4:06
12.	"That's the Way" (featuring Mase, Foxy Brown and Fabolous Sport)	Mason Betha; Inga Marchand; John Jackson; Shaw; Ifill; Chris Frantz; Tina Weymouth; Steven Stanley; Adrian Belew; Harry Wayne Casey; Richard Finch		4:31
13.	"I Like Control" (featuring Missy "Misdemeanor" Elliott, Mocha and Nicole Wray)	Melissa Elliott; Aleesha Richards; Nicole Wray; Shaw; Ifill; El DeBarge; Randy DeBarge; Etterlene Jordan; Howie Tee		3:48
14.	"Bitch Be a Ho" (featuring Jermaine Dupri and R.O.C.)	Jermaine Dupri; Rahman Griffin; Shaw; Ifill; Theophilus Coakley		3:23
15.	"If They Want It" (featuring Fabolous Sport)	Jackson; Shaw; Ifill		4:02
16.	"Pain in da Ass (Skit)"			0:28
17.	"The Professional" (featuring Mobb Deep and Noyd)	Kejuan Muchita; Albert Johnson; TaJuan Perry; Victor Padilla; Shaw; Ifill; Felipe Bojalil Garza; Mario Arturo Ramos	V.I.C.	3:39
18.	"Brown Paper Bag Thoughts" (featuring Raekwon)	Corey Woods; Shaw; Ifill		3:15
19.	"Cops & Robbers" (featuring Lord Tariq and Muggs)	Sean Hamilton; Anthony Best; Paul Cain; Shaw; Ifill; George David Weiss; Hugo Peretti; Luigi Creatore	Buckwild	3:26
20.	"Made Men" (featuring Made Men)	Raymond Scott; Marco Ennis	Hangmen 3	2:41
21.	"No Love" (featuring M.O.P.)	Jamal Grinnage; Eric Murray; Shaw; Ifill; E. DeBarge; R. DeBarge; Jordan	M.O.P.; Laze	4:12
22.	"Come On" (featuring Boot Camp Clik)	Shaw; Ifill; Tekomin Williams; Darrell Yates Jr.; Kenyatta Blake; Sean Price; Jahmal Bush; Louis Johnson		4:31

Sample credits

- "It's On" contains a sample of "Goin' Crazy", written by Johnnie Wilder Jr., and performed by Heatwave.
- "Fantastic 4" contains a sample from "I Think I Love You", written by Tony Romeo, and performed by The Partridge Family.
- "Gangsta Shit" contains a sample from "You and Me", written by Thom Bell and Linda Creed, and performed by The Stylistics.
- "It's My Thang '99" contains a sample from "Seven Minutes of Funk", written by Erick Sermon and Parrish Smith, and performed by EPMD.
- "Whatever You Want" contains an interpolation of "You Got the Love", written by Yvette Marie Stevens and Ray Parker Jr., and performed by Chaka Khan.
- "That's the Way" contains a sample from "Genius of Love", written by Chris Frantz, Tina Weymouth, Steven Stanley, and Adrian Belew; and performed by Tom Tom Club. It also contains an interpolation of "That's the Way (I Like It)", written by Harry Wayne Casey and Richard Finch.
- "I Like Control" contains an interpolation of "I Like It", written by El DeBarge, Randy DeBarge, and Etterlene Jordan. It also contains a sample from "Let's Move It", written by Howie Tee and performed by Special Ed.
- "Bitch Be a Ho" contains a sample from "Love Supreme", written by Theophilus Coakley and performed by the T-Connection.
- "The Professional" contains a sample from "Hasta Que Vuelas", written by Felipe Bojalil Garza and Mario Arturo Ramos, and performed by Vikki Carr.
- "Cops & Robbers" contains a sample of "Lucky Me", written by George David Weiss, Hugo Peretti, and Luigi Creatore; and performed by The Stylistics.
- "No Love" contains an interpolation of "I Like It", written by El DeBarge, Randy DeBarge, and Etterlene Jordan.

== Personnel ==
- Juan Allen – engineer (7)
- Paul Arnold – engineer and mixing (20)
- Tony Black – engineer (13)
- Larry DeVoure – string arrangements (18)
- Brian Fyre – engineer (14)
- Ken DURO Ifill – engineer (3, 4, 6, 9, 11–13, 15, 17–19, 22), mixing (2–9, 11–15, 17–19, 22), keyboards (8)
- Jay Groucott – assistant mix engineer (4, 18)
- Fred Hedemark – assistant mix engineer (7, 9, 17)
- Gal Karmi – assistant engineer (2–4)
- David Matos – guitar (12)
- Martha Mook – strings (18)
- Lil' Rob – keyboards (3, 7, 8, 18, 22), bass guitar (11, 12)
- Paul Olivera – assistant engineer (3, 9, 17)
- Greg Pinto – assistant mix engineer (6, 13–15)
- Vaughn Session – engineer (5)
- Soundboy – engineer (6)
- Steve Sounder – engineer (3)
- Jason Stasium – assistant engineer (8, 11)
- Patrick Viala – engineer (4)
- Zach Wind – assistant engineer (18)
- Carlisle Young – engineer (8), assistant mix engineer (3, 5, 12)

== Charts ==
=== Weekly charts ===
Chart (1999)	Peak position
US Billboard 200	26
US Top R&B/Hip-Hop Albums (Billboard)	3

=== Year-end charts ===
Chart (1999)	Position
US Billboard 200	111
US Top R&B/Hip-Hop Albums (Billboard)	34

== Certifications ==
Region	Certification	Certified units/sales
United States (RIAA)	Platinum	1,000,000^{^}
^{^} Shipments figures based on certification alone.
