= Friday on Elm Street =

Studio album by Fabolous and Jadakiss
- Released: November 24, 2017
- Recorded: 2016–2017
- Genres: Hip hop; horrorcore
- Length: 44:38
- Labels: SoRaspy; Street Family; Roc Nation; D-Block; Desert Storm; Def Jam
- Producers: Adrian Younge; Ben Billions; Buku; C-Sick; Doe Pesci; Grade A; KidExcluzive; Mally the Martian; Mark Henry; Marvino Beats; Neo da Matrix; Pav Bundy; R8; Reazy Renegade; Schife Karbeen; Sean C & LV; Swizz Beatz; Ted Smooth

Fabolous chronology
The Young OG Project (2014)	Friday on Elm Street (2017)	Summertime Shootout 3: Coldest Summer Ever (2019)

Jadakiss chronology
Top 5 Dead or Alive (2015)	Friday on Elm Street (2017)	Ignatius (2020)

Singles from Friday on Elm Street
- 1. "Stand Up" Released: October 31, 2017

Friday on Elm Street (originally titled Freddy vs. Jason) is a collaborative studio album by American rappers Fabolous and Jadakiss. It was released on November 24, 2017, by SoRaspy, Street Family Records, Roc Nation, D-Block Records, Desert Storm Records, and Def Jam Recordings. The album was preceded by one single: "Stand Up" (featuring Future).

== Background ==
Fabolous and Jadakiss have collaborated on a number of tracks, including "Respect It", "The Hope", "B.E.T.", Young Jeezy's "OJ" and Troy Ave's "Do Me No Favors". The album is the speculated horror theme suggested by the title named after two of horror's most popular villains Freddy Krueger and Jason Voorhees. On January 7, 2017, Fabolous and Jadakiss had an interview with HipHopDX and Fab described the theme of the album during the interview.

"...Jason, you knew he was killer. You knew his work and you knew what he do. Freddy was a killer, and he might be a little more witty, cuz he talk more. The Jason character didn’t really say much, but you knew he was there. You can’t even escape it. Once you heard those footsteps, you knew he was in the area. There’s a lot of comparisons when you want to compare to things, but that was one of the ones we were looking at with Freddy vs. Jason. When it came to villains, they were always the two that were brought up."

== Release and promotion ==
On February 29, 2016, Fabolous posted a picture on Instagram with Jadakiss with the caption, "Freddy vs. Jason coming soon". This indicates that Fabolous and Jadakiss are releasing a joint mixtape titled, Freddy vs. Jason. On March 31, 2016, Fabolous releases a snippet of a Metro Boomin-produced song on Instagram that will appear on the album. On April 2, 2016, Fabolous and Jadakiss released a freestyle of Future's "Wicked" from his mixtape, Purple Reign (2016). That same day, Jadakiss tweeted "#FreddyVsJason" to promote the album.

On March 16, 2016, Fabolous confirmed he was releasing a project with Jadakiss, "Oh yeah man, he came to my party out at CIAA in Charlotte and we was talking about doing a couple things and one was to do a mixtape[…]I wanna do a mixtape, but we're gonna go through iTunes too." In October 2016, Lenny "Kodak Lens" Santiago, Senior Vice President of Roc Nation, told fans to prepare for the joint project. "Be excited about Fabolous and Jadakiss and what they’ve been talking about for months," he told Rap-Up. On January 17, 2017, the official trailer for the album was released. It's a blend of The Blair Witch Project, A Nightmare on Elm Street, and Friday the 13th. It's about a young woman running for her life, only to be disappointed, in tears, and haunted by a familiar yet frightening tune.

On November 21, 2017, the tracklist was officially revealed, and the album's title was changed to "Friday on Elm Street," as legal issues prevented the duo from naming it "Freddy vs Jason."

== Singles ==
On January 13, 2017, the promotional single, "Rapture" featuring Tory Lanez was released. The song was produced by Vinylz and Cam O'Bi, which samples Anita Baker's, "Caught Up in the Rapture". The album's lead single "Stand Up" featuring Future was released on October 31, 2017.

== Commercial performance ==
Friday on Elm Street debuted at number 10 on the Billboard 200 with 35,000 album-equivalent units, of which 20,000 were pure album sales. It is Fabolous' sixth US top 10 album and Jadakiss' fifth.

== Track listing ==
Credits were adapted from iTunes and Tidal.

Friday on Elm Street
No.	Title	Writer(s)	Producer(s)	Length
1.	"F vs J Intro"	John Jackson; Jason Phillips; Teddy Mendez; Dwight Brandon; Erick Sermon; Parrish Smith; Al Green	Ted Smooth; Mally the Martian^{[b]}	4:04
2.	"Stand Up" (featuring Future)	Jackson; Phillips; Nayvadius Wilburn; Bryan Johnson	Reazy Renegade	3:21
3.	"Theme Music" (featuring Swizz Beatz)	Jackson; Phillips; Kasseem Dean; Marvin Gaye	Swizz Beatz	3:13
4.	"Ground Up"	Jackson; Phillips; Luis Santiago; Isaac Hayes	Grade A	3:12
5.	"Soul Food"	Jackson; Phillips; Charles Dumazer; Glenn Jones and the Modulations	C-Sick	4:32
6.	"Principles"	Jackson; Phillips; Quaadir Atkinson; Theodore Bowen	Neo da Matrix	3:06
7.	"Talk About It" (featuring Teyana Taylor)	Jackson; Phillips; Liana Banks; Mark Henry; Tyrell McRae; Brandon; Teyana Taylor; Kenneth Edmonds; Daryl Simmons	Mark Henry; KidExcluzive^{[a]}; Mally the Martian^{[a]}	4:36
8.	"All About It" (featuring French Montana)	Jackson; Phillips; Benjamin Diehl; Ian Lewis; Karim Kharbouch	Ben Billions; Schife Karbeen	3:21
9.	"I Pray" (featuring Swizz Beatz)	Jackson; Phillips; Dean; LeVar Coppin; Deleno Matthews; Adrian Younge	Sean C & LV; Adrian Younge^{[a]}; Marvino Beats^{[c]}	3:36
10.	"Ice Pick" (performed by Jadakiss featuring Styles P)	Phillips; Paris Wells; David Styles	Pav Bundy	2:52
11.	"Nightmares Ain't As Bad" (performed by Fabolous)	Jackson; Bryan Antoine; Ibukunoluwatoni Jaiyesimi; Raymond DiFlorio; Brandon	Doe Pesci; Buku; R8; Mally the Martian^{[b]}	2:13
12.	"Stand Up (Remix)" (featuring Future, Yo Gotti and Jeezy)	Jackson; Phillips; Johnson; Wilburn; Mario Mims; Jay Jenkins	Reazy Renegade	5:34
Total length:				43:40

Notes

- ^{^[a]} signifies a co-producer
- ^{^[b]} signifies an additional producer
- ^{^[c]} signifies an uncredited co-producer
- "Ground Up" features background vocals from Luis Santiago.
- "Soul Food" features additional vocals from Daphne Larue.
- "Principles" features background vocals from Range.
- "Nightmares Ain't As Bad" features additional vocals from Kissie Lee.

Sample credits

- "F vs J Intro" contains samples of "You're a Customer" by EPMD and "I'm Glad You're Mine" by Al Green.
- "Theme Music" contains a sample of "Far Cry" by Marvin Gaye.
- "Ground Up" contains a sample of "Breakthrough" by Isaac Hayes.
- "Soul Food" contains a sample of "I'm Willing to Run All the Way" by Glenn Jones and the Modulations.
- "Talk About It" contains a sample of "Can We Talk" by Tevin Campbell.
- "I Pray" contains a sample of "Hands of God" by Adrian Younge.

== Personnel ==
Credits adapted from Tidal.

Performers

- Fabolous – primary artist
- Jadakiss – primary artist
- Future – featured artist (tracks 2, 12)
- Swizz Beatz – featured artist (tracks 3, 9)
- Teyana Taylor – featured artist (track 7)
- French Montana – featured artist (track 8)
- Styles P – featured artist (track 10)
- Yo Gotti – featured artist (track 12)
- Jeezy – featured artist (track 12)

Technical

- Dayzel "The Machine" Fowler – recording engineer (tracks 1, 3–10, 12), mixing engineer (track 2)
- Steve Dickey – recording engineer (tracks 1–9, 11, 12), mixing engineer (tracks 1, 4–12)
- Aneef Sheriff – assistant recording engineer (tracks 1–9, 11, 12)
- Ben Diehl – recording engineer (track 8)

Instruments

- RushDee – keyboard (track 11)
- Ledarius Wilson – keyboard (track 11)

Production

- Ted Smooth – producer (track 1)
- Mally the Martian – additional producer (tracks 1, 11), co-producer (track 7)
- Reazy Renegade – producer (track 2)
- Swizz Beatz – producer (track 3)
- Grade A – producer (track 4)
- C-Sick – producer (track 5)
- Neo da Matrix – producer (track 6)
- Mark Henry – producer (track 7)
- KidExcluzive – co-producer (track 7)
- Ben Billions – producer (track 8)
- Schife Karbeen – producer (track 8)
- Sean C & LV – producer (track 9)
- Adrian Younge – co-producer (track 9)
- Marvino Beats – uncredited co-producer (track 9)
- Pav Bundy – producer (track 10)
- Doe Pesci – producer (track 11)
- Buku – producer (track 11)
- R8 – producer (track 11)

== Charts ==
Chart (2017)	Peak position
US Billboard 200	10
US Top R&B/Hip-Hop Albums (Billboard)	3
