= From Nothin' to Somethin' =

Studio album by Fabolous
- Released: June 12, 2007
- Recorded: 2006–2007
- Genre: Hip-hop
- Length: 63:24
- Labels: Desert Storm; Street Family; Def Jam
- Producers: Reefa; Freebase; Akon; Jermaine Dupri; LRoc; Just Blaze; Timbaland; Polow da Don; Big Tank; Steve Morales; Raymond "Sarom" Diaz; Versatile; Don Cannon; Antwan "Amadeus" Thompson; Nova

Fabolous chronology
Real Talk (2004)	From Nothin' to Somethin' (2007)	Loso's Way (2009)

Singles from From Nothin' to Somethin'
- 1. "Diamonds" Released: April 3, 2007; 2. "Return of the Hustle" Released: April 24, 2007; 3. "Make Me Better" Released: May 15, 2007; 4. "Baby Don't Go" Released: May 22, 2007

Professional ratings
Review scores
Source	Rating
About.com	3/5 stars
AllMusic	3/5 stars
DJBooth.net	3/5 stars
Entertainment Weekly	B+
HipHopDX	3/5 stars
The Independent	(unfavorable)
PopMatters	4/10 stars
RapReviews.com	8/10 stars
Slant Magazine	2.5/5 stars
USA Today	2.5/4 stars

From Nothin' to Somethin' is the fourth album by the American rapper Fabolous. The album was released on June 12, 2007, by DJ Clue's Desert Storm Records, Fabolous' Street Family Records, and Def Jam Recordings. The production on the album was handled by Akon, Timbaland, Jermaine Dupri, Just Blaze and Polow da Don, among others.

From Nothin' to Somethin' was supported by four singles: "Diamonds", "Return of the Hustle", "Make Me Better" and "Baby Don't Go". The album received generally positive reviews and was a commercial success. The album debuted at number 2 on the US Billboard 200, selling 159,000 copies in its first week. It was certified Gold by the Recording Industry Association of America (RIAA).

== Commercial performance ==
From Nothin' to Somethin' debuted at number 2 on the US Billboard 200, selling 159,000 copies in its first week. This became Fabolous' fourth US top-ten debut. In its second week, the album dropped to number 9 on the chart, selling an additional 59,000 copies. On June 24, 2007, the album was certified Gold by the Recording Industry Association of America (RIAA) for sales of over 500,000 copies. As of October 2009, the sold over 566,000 copies in the United States, according to Nielsen Soundscan.

== Track listing ==
Credits adapted from the album's liner notes.

No.	Title	Writer(s)	Producer(s)	Length
1.	"From Nothin' to Somethin'" (Intro)	John Jackson; Sharif Slater	Reefa	2:54
2.	"Yep, I'm Back"	Jackson; Jeffrey Contella	Freebass	4:27
3.	"Change Up" (featuring Akon)	Jackson; Aliaune Thiam	Akon	4:26
4.	"Make Me Better" (featuring Ne-Yo)	Jackson; Timothy Mosley; Scott Storch; Shaffer Smith	Timbaland; Scott Storch	4:13
5.	"Baby Don't Go" (featuring T-Pain and Jermaine Dupri)	Jackson; Jermaine Dupri; Faheem Najm; Vincent Bell	Jermaine Dupri; LRoc (add.)	3:36
6.	"Return of the Hustle" (featuring Swizz Beatz)	Jackson; Justin Smith; Kasseem Dean; Dennis Coles; Robert Diggs; Gary Grice; Lamont Hawkins; Isaac Hayes; Jason Hunter; Russell Jones; David Porter; Clifford Smith; Corey Woods	Just Blaze	3:44
7.	"Gangsta Don't Play" (featuring Junior Reid)	Jackson; Dorrell Mays; Tony Scales; Delroy Reid	Bigg Makk; Chef Tone	4:23
8.	"Real Playa Like" (featuring Lloyd)	Jackson; Jamal Jones; S. Smith	Polow da Don	4:07
9.	"First Time" (featuring Rihanna)	Jackson; Derryck Thornton; Trina Powell	Big Tank	3:53
10.	"Diamonds" (featuring Young Jeezy)	Jackson; Steve Morales; Raymond Diaz; Jay Jenkins; Slater	Steve Morales; Raymond "Sarom" Diaz	4:16
11.	"Brooklyn" (featuring Jay-Z and Uncle Murda)	Jackson; Andrew Roettger; Shawn Carter; Leonard Grant; Tupac Shakur; Christopher Wallace	Versatile	3:56
12.	"I'm the Man" (featuring Red Cafe)	Jackson; Sharif Slater	Reefa	3:28
13.	"Joke's On You" (featuring Pusha T)	Jackson; Don Cannon; Terrance Thornton; Bo Hansson; Kenny Håkansson	Don Cannon	4:31
14.	"What Should I Do" (featuring Lil' Mo)	Jackson; Antwan Thompson; Jeremy Skaller; Robert Larow; Ken Ifill; Arama Brown	Amadeus	4:41
15.	"This Is Family" (featuring Ransom, Freck Billionaire, Red Cafe, Joe Budden and Paul Cain)	Jackson; Scott Novelli; Stephen Hacker; Jeffrey Whitters; Devin Copeland; Joe Budden; Paul Cain; Jermaine Denny; Angelo Bond; William Weatherspoon	Nova	6:53

iTunes Store bonus tracks
No.	Title	Producer(s)	Length
16.	"Supa"	Kanye West, DJ Clue	3:16
17.	"I Shine You Shine" (featuring Makeba)	Versatile	4:03
18.	"Chirp Back" (featuring Bleu Davinci)	Shamtrax	4:12

Sample credits

- "Baby Don't Go" contains interpolations from "Finer Things In Life", written by Vincent Bell.
- "Return of the Hustle" contains resung lyrics from "C.R.E.A.M.", written by Dennis Coles, Robert Diggs, Gary Grice, Lamont Hawkins, Isaac Hayes, Jason Hunter, Russell Jones, David Porter, Clifford Smith, and Corey Woods.
- "Diamonds" contains interpolations from "Do the Damn Thang", written by John David Jackson, Jay W. Jenkins, and Sharif Slater.
- "Brooklyn" contains samples from "Biggie Tupac Live Freestyle", written by Tupac Shakur and Christopher Wallace, as performed by Funkmaster Flex and Big Kap.
- "Joke's On You" contains samples from "Born of a Gentle South", written by Bo Hansson and Kenny Håkansson, as performed by Bo Hansson.
- "This Is Family" contains a sample from "I Can't Believe You're Gone", written by Angelo Bond and William Weatherspoon, as performed by The Barrino Brothers.

== Personnel ==
- Chris Athens – mastering
- Ashaunna Ayars – marketing
- David Brown – engineer
- Shari Bryant – marketing
- Miguel Bustamante – mixing assistant
- Don Cannon – producer, engineer
- Jermaine Dupri – producer, mixing
- King Khaliyl – producer
- Aaron Heick – saxophon
- John Horesco IV – engineer
- Josh Houghkirk – mixing assistant
- Ken Ifill – executive producer
- Terese Joseph – A&R
- Just Blaze – producer, mixing
- Jeff Kievit – trumpet
- Tai Linzie – photography, art coordinator
- Supa Engineer DURO – mixing
- Jonathan Mannion – photography
- Rob Mathes – arranger
- Darryl "Big Baby" McClary – keyboards
- Steve Morales & Sarom – producer
- Sandra Park – violin
- Ken "Duro" Ifill – engineer
- Wen Qian – violin
- TaVon Sampson – art direction
- Alan J. Stepansky – cello
- Phil Tan – mixing
- Antwan "Amadeus" Thompson – drums, producer
- Versatile – producer
- Andrew Roettger "Versatile" – producer
- Timbaland – producer
- Dan Tobiason – mixing assistant
- Steve Tolle – mixing assistant
- Ryan West – engineer, mixing
- Jordan "DJ Swivel" Young – assistant engineer, mixing assistant
- Rebecca Young – viola

== Charts ==
=== Weekly charts ===
Weekly chart performance for From Nothin' to Somethin'
Chart (2007)	Peak position
Swiss Albums (Schweizer Hitparade)	55
UK Albums (Official Charts)	89
US Billboard 200	2
US Top R&B/Hip-Hop Albums (Billboard)	1

=== Year-end charts ===
Year-end chart performance for From Nothin' to Somethin'
Chart (2007)	Position
US Billboard 200	98
US Top R&B/Hip-Hop Albums (Billboard)	29

== Certifications ==
Region	Certification	Certified units/sales
United States (RIAA)	Gold	500,000^{^}
^{^} Shipments figures based on certification alone.
