= Summertime Shootout 3: Coldest Summer Ever =

Studio album by Fabolous
- Released: November 29, 2019
- Recorded: 2017–2019
- Genre: Hip hop
- Length: 65:51
- Labels: Street Family; Desert Storm; Roc Nation; Def Jam
- Producers: 30 Roc; Araab Muzik; Bink!; Chopsquad DJ; Cubeatz; DJ Khalil; DJ Lavish Lee; DY; Foreign Teck; Hitmaka; Jaye R; Leer Luciano; Maaly Raw; Mally The Martian; Motif Alumni; OG Parker; Omar Grand; Paul Cabbin; Reazy Renegade; Rob Halladay; Smash David; StreetRunner; Swiff D; Tariq Beats; TM88; Wallis Lane

Fabolous chronology
Friday on Elm Street (2017)	Summertime Shootout 3: Coldest Summer Ever (2019)

Singles from Summertime Shootout 3: Coldest Summer Ever
- 1. "Ooh Yea" Released: July 8, 2018; 2. "Choosy" Released: October 14, 2019; 3. "B.O.M.B.S." Released: November 15, 2019

Professional ratings
Review scores
Source	Rating
RapReviews	7/10

Summertime Shootout 3: Coldest Summer Ever is the seventh studio album by American rapper Fabolous, released on November 29, 2019, by Street Family Records, Desert Storm Records, Roc Nation, and Def Jam Recordings. The album includes guest appearances from 2 Chainz, A Boogie wit da Hoodie, Chris Brown, Davido, Gucci Mane, Jacquees, Jeremih, Josh K, Lil Durk, Meek Mill, PnB Rock, Roddy Ricch, Teyana Taylor, Tory Lanez, Ty Dolla Sign and YFN Lucci. The album also serves as the third and final installment of the Summertime Shootout series.

== Background ==
In August 2017, Fabolous announced the project via his Instagram using the hashtag "#SummertimeShootout3OnTheWay". On July 8, 2018, the first single "Ooh Yea" featuring Ty Dolla $ign was released. On October 14, 2019, the second single "Choosy" featuring Jeremih and Davido was released. On November 15, 2019, the third single "B.O.M.B.S." was released. On March 27, 2020, the music video for "Cold Summer" was released and directed by Diego Cruz. In early April 2020, Fabolous started the #ColdSummerChallenge on Instagram during the COVID-19 pandemic lockdown, allowing fans and other artists to share their creativity by performing a freestyle over the instrumental using the hashtag.

== Release ==
Ten days before the release of the album, Fabolous posted a 30-second trailer for the album on his Instagram along with its release date. A week later the tracklist and the cover art for the album was revealed.

== Commercial performance ==
Summertime Shootout 3: Coldest Summer Ever debuted at number seven on the US Billboard 200 chart, earning 44,000 album-equivalent units, of which 6,000 were pure album sales in its first week, becoming Fabolous's seventh US top ten on the chart.

== Track listing ==
No.	Title	Writer(s)	Producer(s)	Length
1.	"Cold Summer"	John Jackson; Abraham Orellana; Marcus Rucker	AraabMuzik; Motif Alumni	4:29
2.	"B.O.M.B.S."	Jackson; Nicholas Warwar; Alan Parsons; Eric Woolfson	StreetRunner	3:05
3.	"Talk to Me Nicely" (featuring Meek Mill)	Jackson; Robert Williams; Jamaal Henry; Tim Gomringer; Kevin Gomringer	Maaly Raw; Cubeatz	3:17
4.	"Cap" (featuring Lil Durk)	Jackson; Durk Banks; Dwan Avery; Darrell Jackson	DY; Chopsquad DJ; TM88^{[a]}	3:48
5.	"Gone for the Summer" (featuring A Boogie wit da Hoodie)	Jackson; Jason Baptiste; Warwar; Julius Dubose; Wallace Childs; James Epps, Jr.; Cleveland Horne; Joseph Pruitt	Jaye R; StreetRunner	5:44
6.	"Seasons Change" (featuring Tory Lanez)	Jackson; Daystar Peterson; Bryan Johnson; Alton Taylor; Robert Mickens; Ronald Bell; Dennis Thomas; Richard Westfield; George Brown; Claydes Smith; Robert Bell; Willard Smith III; Lamar Mahone; Craig Simpkins	Reazy Renegade	3:28
7.	"Bae Dreaming" (featuring YFN Lucci)	Jackson; Rayshawn Bennett; Marcus Murray; Marcus London	DJ Lavish Lee	2:44
8.	"My Mind" (featuring Jacquees)	Jackson; Rodriguez Broadnax; Christian Ward; Joe Thomas; Altariq Crapps; Lerron Carson; Tim Kelley; Bob Robinson; Joshua Thompson	Hitmaka; Tariq Beats; Paul Cabbin	3:40
9.	"Choosy" (featuring Jeremih and Davido)	Jackson; Jeremy Felton; David Adeleke; Ward; Steve Thornton	Hitmaka; Swiff D	3:34
10.	"Ooh Yea" (featuring Ty Dolla Sign)	Jackson; Tyrone Griffin, Jr.; Ward; Michael Hernandez; Christopher Dotson; Floyd Bentley; Nima Jahanbin; Paimon Jahanbin	Hitmaka; Foreign Teck; Wallis Lane	3:29
11.	"Options" (featuring PnB Rock, Gucci Mane and 2 Chainz)	Jackson; Rakim Allen; Radric Davis; Tauheed Epps; Ward; Samuel Jimenez; Joshua Parker; Robert Davidson, Jr.; Tony Hester	Hitmaka; Rob Holladay; Smash David; OG Parker	3:46
12.	"Insecure"	Jackson; Orellana; Christopher Stewart; Terius Nash	AraabMuzik	4:41
13.	"Frenemies" (featuring Josh K)	Jackson; Joshua Kirksy; Dwight Brandon; Omar Perrin; Barrington Levy	Mally the Martian; Omar Grand	5:45
14.	"Time" (featuring Roddy Ricch)	Jackson; Rodrick Moore; Samuel Gloade; Lamont Porter; Sabrina Claudio; Mark Pellizzer; Hayley Penner	30 Roc; Ez Elpee	3:41
15.	"Us vs. The World" (featuring Chris Brown and Teyana Taylor)	Jackson; Kyleer Evans; Chris Brown; Teyana Taylor; Edward Alfonso II; Jamal Glaze; LaMarquis Jefferson; Craig Love; Jonathan H. Smith; Darnell Prince; Kirksy	Leer Luciano	5:50
16.	"Too Late" (featuring Jeremih)	Jackson; Roosevelt Harrell; Khalil Abdul-Rahman; Felton	Bink!; DJ Khalil; Hitmaka^{[a]}	4:50
Total length:				65:51

Notes

- ^{^[a]} signifies an uncredited co-producer

Sample credits

- "B.O.M.B.S." contains a sample from "Sirius", written by Alan Parsons and Eric Woolfson, as performed by The Alan Parsons Project.
- "Gone for the Summer" contains a sample from "Mixed Up Moods and Attitudes", performed by The Fantastic Four.
- "Seasons Change" contains a sample from "Summertime", performed by DJ Jazzy Jeff & The Fresh Prince.
- "My Mind" contains a sample from "Missing You", performed by Case.
- "Options" contains a sample from "Love Is Missing From Our Lives", performed by The Dells and The Dramatics.
- "Insecure" contains an interpolation from "Song Cry", written by Jay Z, and a sample from "I Luv Your Girl" performed by The-Dream.
- "Frenemies" contains an interpolation from "Friends", performed by Whodini, and a sample from "The Vibes is Right", as performed by Barrington Levy.
- "Us vs. The World" contains both a sample and an interpolation from "Some Cut", performed by Trillville.

== Charts ==
=== Weekly charts ===
Chart (2019)	Peak position
Canadian Albums (Billboard)	39
US Billboard 200	7
US Top R&B/Hip-Hop Albums (Billboard)	3

=== Year-end charts ===
Chart (2020)	Position
US Top R&B/Hip-Hop Albums (Billboard)	94
