= Baby Don't Go (Fabolous song) =

Single by Fabolous featuring Jermaine Dupri and T-Pain

from the album From Nothin' to Somethin'
- Released: May 22, 2007
- Recorded: 2007
- Genre: Hip-hop; pop rap; R&B
- Length: 3:36
- Label: Desert Storm
- Songwriters: John Jackson; Jermaine Mauldin; Faheem Najm; Vincent Bell
- Producer: Jermaine Dupri

Fabolous singles chronology
"Make Me Better" (2007)	"Baby Don't Go" (2007)	"Shawty Is a 10" (2007)

Jermaine Dupri singles chronology
"I'm Throwed" (2007)	"Baby Don't Go" (2007)	"Finer Things" (2008)

T-Pain singles chronology
"Shawty" (2007)	"Baby Don't Go" (2007)	"I'm So Hood" (2007)

"Baby Don't Go" is the fourth single from Fabolous' fourth studio album From Nothin' to Somethin'. The video features Jermaine Dupri, who also produced the song. T-Pain contributes to the radio and album version. A somewhat similar instrumental for the song was used in season 2 of Jersey Shore.

The song contains samples from "The Finer Things" by Chuck Stanley and "Let Me Get Some" by Whodini.

== Music video ==
The video, which features Fabolous and Dupri premiered on BET's 106 & Park on September 12, 2007. Larissa Hodge-Aurora and Shay Johnson, better known as Bootz and Buckeey from VH1's Flavor of Love and Charm School make cameos. The video was shot at the New Jersey mansion of New York Giants defensive end Osi Umenyiora. T-Pain does not appear in the video.

== Track listings ==
1. "Baby Don't Go" (Clean version)
2. "Baby Don't Go" (Dirty version)
3. "Baby Don't Go" (Instrumental)

== Charts ==
Chart (2007)	Peak Position
U.S. Billboard Hot 100	23
U.S. Billboard Hot R&B/Hip-Hop Songs	23
U.S. Billboard Hot Rap Tracks	4
U.S. Billboard Pop 100	32

== Certifications ==
Region	Certification	Certified units/sales
United States (RIAA)	Gold	500,000^{‡}
^{‡} Sales+streaming figures based on certification alone.
