= The Young OG Project =

Studio album by Fabolous
- Released: December 25, 2014
- Recorded: 2014
- Genre: Hip hop
- Length: 49:10
- Label: Street Family; Desert Storm; Roc Nation; Def Jam
- Producer: OZ; The Mekanics; Mally the Martian; DJ RellyRell; Mark Henry; Phonix Beats; Vinylz; The Superiors; Detrakz; Count Justice; Boi-1da; C-Sick; Chase N. Cashe

Fabolous chronology
Loso's Way (2009)	The Young OG Project (2014)	Friday on Elm Street (2017)

Singles from The Young OG Project
- 1. "Lituation" Released: December 5, 2014

The Young OG Project is the sixth studio album by American rapper Fabolous; it was released on December 25, 2014, by Def Jam Recordings, Desert Storm Records, Street Family Records and Roc Nation. The album features guest appearances from Chris Brown, Velous, French Montana, Tish Hyman and more. It also includes production from Vinylz, Boi-1da, C-Sick and The Mekanics, among others. The album is supported by the lone single, "Lituation".

== Background ==
Fabolous said that the album would be "very '90s-inspired and '90s-themed". "I was introduced to hip-hop in the '80s, but the '90s is when it flourished and you saw different people, different styles and different regions emerge it was a very diverse and versatile time and that's another reason why it sticks to me," he told MTV. He said that the whole goal for the album was about his perspective of the '90's, where he came from and where he is today. He also said that it could bring back memories of the guys who really lived in it and it could influence the people who didn't live in it, they could also go in the vibe of it or look up the songs where it came from.

== Critical response ==
Professional ratings
Review scores
Source	Rating
AllMusic	3.5/5 stars
DJBooth	4/5 stars
HipHopDX	3.5/5 stars

The Young OG Project received positive reviews from music critics. Andrew Gretchko of HipHopDX said, "It’s an album filled with features – Rich Homie Quan, Chris Brown, French Montana and even Kevin Hart – and beats that are a mix of the wavy, electronic sounds so prevalent today and the anthemic rhythms of ‘90s-style tracks, each with plenty of bass to back the lyrics. With intros delivered by The Notorious B.I.G. and even a sampling of Drake’s “Fancy” flow, The Young OG Project has tracks for fans of the many subgenres of Hip Hop, from ‘90s beats to both commercial and street hooks. And while Fabolous may not excel on all of the album’s bouncier tracks the way he does over the laid back beats, his Christmas present to the world hits the right notes."

David Jeffries of AllMusic said, "While 2014 was supposed to see the sequel to Fabolous' 2009 release Losos Way, the album The Young OG Project landed instead, celebrating the rapper's love of '90s hip-hop. As such, old-school act Brand Nubian get a righteous tribute with the opening "Lituation," but it takes until track three for the sound of the decade to power the aptly titled "All Good," while later, "Bish Bounce" bumps like Das EFX in their prime. Otherwise, the 1990s influence is less palpable as cloud rap beats ("We Good" floats, stutters, and dissolves) and an appearance from comedian Kevin Hart (during the Digable Planets-ish highlight "Cinnamon Apple") make this an album for the 2014–2015 season, while guest appearances from Rich Homie Quan, Chris Brown, and French Montana are as populist as they are contemporary. Still, Fabolous is invigorated by this slight slide into the past, and offers up numerous highlights (including the not-yet-mentioned "Ball Drop," a great New Year's Eve cut where everything is renewed) with a strong second line in support.

== Commercial performance ==
The album debuted at number 12 on the Billboard 200 chart, with first-week sales of 71,000 copies in the United States, making it the rapper's lowest charting album in the US. In its second week, the album dropped to number 20 on the chart, selling 25,000 copies, bringing its total album sales to 96,000 copies.

== Track listing ==
No.	Title	Writer(s)	Producer(s)	Length
1.	"Lituation"	John David Jackson; Dwight Brandon; Alberto Moreno	Mally the Martian	3:42
2.	"We Good" (featuring Rich Homie Quan)	Jackson; Dequantes Devontay Lamar; Darius Barnes; Ahmad Jamal; Darren Anthony	Phonix Beats	4:17
3.	"All Good" (featuring Notorious B.I.G)	Jackson; Mike Jones; Javon Reynolds; Sidney Reynolds; Detric Jamal Jackson; Jimmy Barnes; Avery Chambliss; Evans J. Clark; Sean Combs; Kasseem Dean; Aubrey Graham; Clifford Harris, Jr.; Aubrey Johnson; James Mtume; Jean-Claude Olivier; Matthew Jehu Samuels; Noah Shebib; Christopher Wallace; Hermon Weems; Henry Zant	The Superiors; Detrakz	3:45
4.	"You Made Me" (featuring Tish Hyman)	Jackson; Diane Bernstein; Jesse Woodard IV; Ted Mills; William Neale	Chase N. Cashe	4:10
5.	"She Wildin'" (featuring Chris Brown)	Jackson; Christopher Brown; J. Reynolds; S. Reynolds; Chris Justice; Michael Epps; Jabari Jones; Nasir Jones; Didier Malherbe; Eugene O'Gray; Lamont Porter	The Superiors; Count Justice	3:49
6.	"Ball Drop" (featuring French Montana)	Jackson; Ozan Yildirim; Michael Hernandez; Rico Evans; Kharim Kharbouch	The Mekanics; OZ	5:24
7.	"Bish Bounce"	Jackson; Samuels; Anderson Hernandez	Vinylz; Boi-1da	3:59
8.	"Rap & Sex"	Jackson; Jonathan Burks; Shawn Carter; Charles Dumazer; Timothy Mosley	C-Sick	4:30
9.	"Gone for the Winter" (featuring Velous)	Jackson; A. Hernandez; Tyler Bryant; Ted Creech; Lee Erwin; Terrell Roberts	DJ RellyRell; Vinylz	6:17
10.	"Cinnamon Apple" (featuring Kevin Hart)	Jackson; Barnes	Phonix Beats	3:14
11.	"Young OG II" (featuring Abir Haronni)	Jackson; Abir Haronni; Mark Henry; Thomas Bangalter; Brandon; Keith Carter; Mike Dean; Christo Homem; Malik Yusef Jones; Elon Rutberg; Che Smith; Derek Witkins; Kanye West; Cydel Young	Henry	6:04
Total length:				49:10

Sample credits

- "All Good" contains samples of "Juicy" as performed by The Notorious B.I.G., "Slow Motion" as performed by Juvenile featuring Soulja Slim, and "I Think I've Got A Good Chance Pt. 2" by J.J. Barnes.
- "Gone For The Winter" contains a sample of "Thief of Bagdad" as performed by Lee Erwin.
- "She Wildin'" contains a sample of "Oochie Wally" as performed by Nas & Bravehearts.

== Personnel ==
Credits adapted from AllMusic.

- Thomas Bangalter - Composer
- Darius Barnes - Composer
- Jimmy Barnes - Composer
- Diane Bernstein - Composer
- Dwight Brandon - Composer
- Chris Brown - Composer, Primary Artist
- Johnathan Burks - Composer
- Keith Carter - Composer
- Shawn Carter - Composer
- Avery Chambliss - Composer
- Evans J. Clark - Composer
- Sean Combs - Composer
- Ted Creech - Composer
- Kaseem Dean - Composer
- Mike Dean - Composer
- Charles Dumazer - Composer
- Michael Epps - Composer
- Lee Erwin - Composer
- Jared Evans - Composer
- Fabolous - Primary Artist
- French Montana - Primary Artist
- Aubrey "Drake" Graham - Composer
- Abir Haronni - Composer, Primary Artist
- Clifford Harris - Composer
- Kevin Hart - Primary Artist
- Mark Henry - Composer
- Anderson Hernandez - Composer
- Michael Hernandez - Composer
- Christo Homem - Composer
- Tish Hyman - Primary Artist
- Detric Jamal Jackson - Composer
- John Jackson - Composer
- Ahmad Jackson - Composer
- Aubry Johnson - Composer
- Jabari Jones - Composer
- Malik Yusef Jones - Composer
- Nasir Jones - Composer
- Chris Justice - Composer
- Karim Kharbouch - Composer
- Dequantes Devontay Lamar - Composer
- Didier Malherbe - Composer
- Ted Mills - Composer
- Alberto Moreno - Composer
- Timothy Mosley - Composer
- James Mtume - Composer
- William Neale - Composer
- Eugene O'Grey - Composer
- Jean Claude "Poke" Oliver - Composer
- Lamont Porter - Composer
- Rich Homie Quan - Primary Artist
- Javon Reynolds - Composer
- Sidney Reynolds - Composer
- Terrell Roberts - Composer
- Elon Rutberg - Composer
- Matthew Samuels - Composer
- Noah Shebib - Composer
- Che Smith - Composer
- Velous - Primary Artist
- Christopher Wallace - Composer
- Derek Watkins - Composer
- Hermon Weems - Composer
- Kanye West - Composer
- Jesse Woodard - Composer
- Ozan Yildirim - Composer
- Cydel Young - Composer
- Henry Zant - Composer

== Charts ==
=== Weekly charts ===
Chart (2015)	Peak position
US Billboard 200	12
US Top R&B/Hip-Hop Albums (Billboard)	3
US Top Rap Albums (Billboard)	3

=== Year-end charts ===
Chart (2015)	Position
US Top R&B/Hip-Hop Albums (Billboard)	33
