= The Professional 3 =

Studio album by DJ Clue?
- Released: December 19, 2006
- Genre: Hip-hop
- Labels: Desert Storm; Roc-A-Fella; Def Jam
- Producers: Skane (exec.); DJ Clue? (also exec.); DURO (also exec.); Baby Paul; CHOPS; Doughboyz; Kanye West; L.T. Hutton; Shatek King; Swizz Beatz; The Heatmakerz

DJ Clue? chronology
The Professional 2 (2001)	The Professional 3 (2006)

Professional ratings
Review scores
Source	Rating
HipHopDX	3/5
RapReviews	6.5/10
USA Today	3.5/4 stars

The Professional 3 is the third studio album by American record producer DJ Clue. It was released on December 19, 2006 via Def Jam Recordings, Roc-A-Fella Records, and Desert Storm Records, serving as a sequel to his 2001 The Professional 2.

Production was handled by Ken "Duro" Ifill, Doughboyz, Baby Paul, CHOPS, Kanye West, L.T. Hutton, Shatek King, Swizz Beatz. The Heatmakerz and Clue himself.

It features guest appearances by Fabolous, Juelz Santana, Mario Winans, The Game, Beanie Sigel, Bun B, Cam'ron, Cassidy, Consequence, Fat Joe, Freeway, Jadakiss, Jagged Edge, Kanye West, Lil Wayne, Mike Jones, Mobb Deep, M.O.P., Nas, Paul Wall, Ransom, Remy Ma, Rick Ross, Snoop Dogg, Styles P and Young Jeezy.

The album peaked at number seventy-three on the Billboard 200 chart, and number eighteen on the Top R&B/Hip-Hop Albums chart.

== Track listing ==
No.	Title	Writer(s)	Producer(s)	Length
1.	"War" (featuring Nas)	Scott Storch	Scott Storch	1:57
2.	"Clear Da Scene" (featuring Rick Ross, Lil Wayne and Ransom)	William Roberts; Bigram Zayas; Mark Morales; Darren Robinson; Damon Wimbley	Doughboyz	3:53
3.	"Fuck Off" (featuring Young Jeezy and Juelz Santana)	Zayes; LaRon James; Jay Jenkins; Donald French; Millie Jackson	Develop	2:47
4.	"The Gold" (featuring Mobb Deep)	Ernesto Shaw; Albert Johnson; Kejuan Muchita; Sheila Ferguson; Diran Garvarentz	DJ Clue	4:26
5.	"I Really Wanna Know You" (featuring Jagged Edge and Fabolous)	Shaw; Ken Ifill; John Jackson; Don DeGrate; Roy Hammond	DJ Clue; DURO; Jremy^{[a]}; Jovonn "The Last Don" Alexander^{[a]}	6:12
6.	"A Week Ago, Part I" (featuring Mario Winans and Game)	Shaw; Jayceon Taylor; Mario Winans; Balewa	DJ Clue; Claude Kelly^{[a]}	4:15
7.	"Like This" (featuring Fabolous and Kanye West)	J. Jackson; Kanye West	Kanye West	5:28
8.	"Almost Fucked" (featuring Snoop Dogg)	Calvin Broadus; Lenton Terrell Hutton; James Brown; Rob Base	LT Hutton	2:47
9.	"Grill & Woman" (featuring Mike Jones, Paul Wall and Bun B)	Michael Jones; Paul Slayton; Bernard Freeman	Chops	4:33
10.	"Liberty Bell" (featuring Beanie Sigel, Cassidy and Freeway)	Shaw; Dwight Grant; Barry Reese; Leslie Pridgen; Jimmy Lewis	DJ Clue	2:48
11.	"Da Boss" (featuring Fabolous)	J. Jackson; Shatek King; King Floyd	Sha Tek	3:12
12.	"The Animal" (featuring Styles P)	Shaw; David Styles	DJ Clue	3:18
13.	"Middle Finger U" (featuring Cam'ron and Juelz Santana)	Shaw; Cameron Giles; James	DJ Clue	3:44
14.	"Giantz of NYC" (featuring M.O.P.)	Eric Murray; Jamal Grinnage; Gregory Green; Sean Thomas; M. Jackson; Randy Klein	The Heatmakerz	4:19
15.	"You Don't Really Wanna" (featuring Fat Joe and Remy Ma)	Joseph Cartagena; Reminisce Smith; Kenny Gamble; Leon Huff	Baby Paul; Mike Risko^{[b]}	3:22
16.	"Ugly (Thug It Out)" (featuring Jadakiss and Swizz Beatz)	Kasseem Dean; Jason Phillips	Swizz Beatz	4:00
17.	"A Week Ago, Part 2" (featuring Game and Mario Winans)	Shaw; Taylor; Winans	DJ Clue	4:16
18.	"Uptown" (featuring Consequence)			3:43

Notes

- ^{^[a]} signifies additional vocal production
- ^{^[b]} signifies a co-producer

Sample credits

- "Clear Da Scene" contains elements from "Stick Em", written by Mark Morales, Darren Robinson, and Damon Wimbley.
- "Fuck Off" contains samples from "A Child of God (It's Hard to Believe", written by Donald French and Millie Jackson, and performed by Millie Jackson.
- "The Gold" contains a sample of "The Golden Lady", written by Sheila Ferguson and Diran Garvarentz, as performed by The Three Degrees.
- "I Really Wanna Know You"
  - contains elements from "Come and Talk to Me", written by Don DeGrate.
  - contains a sample of "Impeach the President", written by Roy Hammond, as performed by The Honey Drippers.
- "Almost Fucked" contains elements from "It Takes Two", written by James Brown and Rob Base.
- "Liberty Bell" contains a sample from "That Won't Stop Me (From Loving You)", as performed and written by Jimmy Lewis.
- "Da Boss" contains elements from "Please Don't Leave Me Lonely", performed and written by King Floyd.
- Giantz of NYC" contains a sample of "Go Out and Get Some (Get It Out Cha System)", as performed by Millie Jackson, written by Millie Jackson and Randy Klein.
- "You Don't Really Wanna" contains excerpts from "Brown Baby", performed by Billy Paul, and written by Kenny Gamble and Leon Huff.

== Personnel ==
- DJ Clue – executive producer, keyboards (6, 10, 12)
- Jovonn "The Last Don" Alexander – keyboards (13)
- Chris Athens – mastering
- Darryl Beaton – keyboards (7)
- Dinky Bingham – keyboards (5, 6)
- Chops – engineer (9)
- Miss Connie – background vocals (7)
- Develop – engineer (2)
- Skane Dolla – executive producer
- Shaun Don – mixing (8)
- Supa Engineer DURO – executive producer, engineer (11), mixing (2–7, 9–17)
- Khalil "BDK" Edwards – mixing assistant (3–7, 10–15, 17)
- Paul Gregory – engineer (4–6, 10, 12–15, 17)
- LT Hutton – hook and vocals (8)
- Gimel "Young Guru" Keaton – engineer (7)
- Claude Kelly – additional background vocals (6)
- Sam Lebeau – engineer (8)
- Poobs – engineer (16)
- Eric "ERK" Vargas – engineer (16)
- Jordan "DJ Swivel" Young – mixing assistant (3–7, 10–15, 17)

== Charts ==
=== Weekly charts ===
Chart (2007)	Peak position
US Billboard 200	73
US Top R&B/Hip-Hop Albums (Billboard)	18
US Top Rap Albums (Billboard)	9

=== Year-end charts ===
Chart (2007)	Position
US Top R&B/Hip-Hop Albums (Billboard)	96
