= Make Me Better =

Single by Fabolous featuring Ne-Yo

from the album From Nothin' to Somethin'
- Released: May 15, 2007 (global)
- Recorded: 2007
- Studio: Brooklyn, New York, United States and Hollywood, Los Angeles, California, United States
- Genre: East Coast hip hop, R&B
- Length: 4:13
- Label: Desert Storm, Def Jam
- Songwriters: John Jackson, Timothy Mosley, Shaffer Smith
- Producer: Timbaland

Fabolous singles chronology
"Return of the Hustle" (2007)	"Make Me Better" (2007)	"Baby Don't Go" (2007)

"Make Me Better" is a song by American rapper Fabolous featuring American singer Ne-Yo, released by Def Jam Recordings on May 15, 2007 as the third single from the former's fourth album, From Nothin' to Somethin' (2007). Both performers co-wrote the song with American record producer Timbaland, who produced it.

"Make Me Better" peaked at number eight on the Billboard Hot 100, and remains Fabolous' second-highest charting song as a lead artist.

== Background ==
Timbaland is quoted as saying that:

"the beat is unique sounding and the strings are so good that they will have to be used on future songs".

The strings are sampled from Sherine's "Al Sa'ban Aleh". As for the lyrics, Fabolous and Ne-Yo tell ladies they are forces to be reckoned with on their own — but with their ladies upgrading them, they're that much better.

"You want a girl that completes you and makes you better," he explained. "You don't want a girl who brings more arguments and more bills. ... You want a girl who, when you're walking around with your tie crooked, she fixes your tie. .... That's the kind of [woman] I'm looking for. Whether she's a celebrity or non-celebrity don't really matter. You just need somebody you can connect with. "It touches so many places," Fab added of the song. "It's a sexy record, plus a swagger record, an anthem record all in one. ... I played it for a couple of dudes a week ago, and they was like, 'I'mma tell my shorty that: "Yo, shorty, you make me better. I'm cool, I'm fly and sh--, but us together, we make a great pair." "Dudes can take it — it's giving them some game. I felt it could work on all levels."

The full song was leaked to the internet on April 9, 2007.

The beat was originally created for rapper Eve and featured Timbaland over a song called "Nothing to Say." On April 5, 2019, Eve revealed on The Talk (which she co-hosts) when working on Here I Am she revealed that beats originally intended for her album were sold to other artists by her label without her consent including "Nothing to Say" which became "Make Me Better."

== Music video ==
An accompanying music video was released online on May 23, 2007, and premiered on BET two days later. The video features Roselyn Sánchez as appears as Fabolous's love interest, as well as cameos from rapper Red Café and actor Dwight Freeney, the latter of whom is seen getting challenged by a drunken man.

== Accolades ==
In its January 2008 issue, Vibe magazine named "Make Me Better" the best song of 2007 on its list of the top 44.

== Remixes ==
The official remix was produced by Drumma Boy and Atlanta DJ Greg Street, under the title "Greg Street Remix". There are two official versions of the remix, the main official remix features the group Jagged Edge and the second remix features Lil' Mo. The remix samples The Isley Brothers' "Between the Sheets".

Wu-Tang Clan member Raekwon did an official remix to the song, the remix samples his 1995 track "Rainy Dayz" on Raekwon's verses.

== Track listings ==
1. 1. "Make Me Better" (explicit version) - 4:13
2. 2. "Make Me Better" (clean version) - 4:13
3. 3. "Make Me Better" (Greg Street remix) - 5:26
4. 4. "Make Me Better" (demo edit) - 2:50

== Charts ==
On the issue date of June 9, 2007 the single debuted on the Billboard Hot 100 at number 96 and has peaked at number 8. The song spent 14 weeks at number 1 in the magazine's Hot Rap Songs chart. This is a record for 2006 and 2007 on this chart.

=== Weekly charts ===
Weekly chart performance for "Make Me Better"
Chart (2007)	Peak position
Canada Hot 100 (Billboard)	79
US Billboard Hot 100	8
US Hot R&B/Hip-Hop Songs (Billboard)	2
US Hot Rap Songs (Billboard)	1
US Pop Airplay (Billboard)	14
US Rhythmic Airplay (Billboard)	1

=== Year-end charts ===
Chart (2007)	position
US Billboard Hot 100	44
US Hot R&B/Hip-Hop Songs (Billboard)	16
US Rhythmic (Billboard)	5

== Certifications ==
Region	Certification	Certified units/sales
United States (RIAA)	Platinum	1,000,000^{*}
^{*} Sales figures based on certification alone.
