= Diamonds (Fabolous song) =

2007 song by Fabolous

Single by Fabolous featuring Young Jeezy

from the album From Nothin' to Somethin'
- Released: April 3, 2007
- Recorded: 2006
- Genre: Hip hop
- Length: 4:16
- Label: Def Jam
- Songwriters: John Jackson; Jay Jenkins; Christian Ward
- Producer: Steve Morales

Fabolous singles chronology
"Baby" (2005)	"Diamonds" (2007)	"Return of the Hustle" (2007)

Young Jeezy singles chronology
"Dreamin'" (2007)	"Diamonds" (2007)	"5000 Ones" (2007)

"Diamonds" is a song by American rapper Fabolous, released by Def Jam Recordings on April 3, 2007 as the lead single from his fourth album, From Nothin' to Somethin' (2007). The song features fellow Def Jam artist Young Jeezy, and was co-written by both performers along with Yung Berg. Coincidentally, the voice sample heard in the song's hook is also Young Jeezy, from his guest appearance on another Fabolous song, "Do the Damn Thing", from the latter's previous album Real Talk (2004).

On the week dated April 21, 2007, "Diamonds" debuted and peaked at number 83 on the Billboard Hot 100.

== Background ==
The original version of the song featured Lil Wayne, but was changed due to Def Jam wanting to have a fellow Def Jam artist on the song. The song was produced by Steve Morales. Upon release, the song premiered on iTunes.

The song samples Jay-Z's line, "said she loved my necklace, started relaxing, now that's what the fuck I call a chain reaction" from the 1998 Jermaine Dupri song, "Money Ain't a Thang".

== Music video ==
The video features cameos from Blood Raw, Red Cafe and Slick Pulla.

== Charts ==
Chart (2007)	Peak position
US Billboard Hot 100	83
US Hot R&B/Hip-Hop Songs (Billboard)	59
US Pop 100 (Billboard)	87
