= DJ Clue =

American DJ and producer (born 1975)

- Also known as: MC Drama; Clueminatti
- Born: Ernesto Shaw Jr. January 8, 1975 (age 51); Queens, New York City, U.S.
- Genres: East Coast hip-hop; R&B
- Occupations: Disc jockey; record producer; radio personality; record executive
- Years active: 1995–present
- Labels: Island Def Jam; Def Jam; Desert Storm; Roc-A-Fella

Ernesto Shaw (born January 8, 1975), better known by his stage name DJ Clue (often stylized as DJ Clue?), is an American disc jockey (DJ), record producer, radio personality and record executive.

== Early life ==
DJ Clue was born in Queens, New York City to Panamanian and Jamaican immigrants.

== Career ==
DJ Clue has his own program, titled "Desert Storm Radio", every Monday to Friday 6:00 pm – 10:00 pm, on Power 105.1 in New York. Prior to this, he disc-jockeyed at Hot 97, until 2006.

In 1998, DJ Clue founded Desert Storm Records, a record label, with his childhood friends Skane Dolla (manager) and recording engineer Ken Duro Ifill.

In 1999, DJ Clue took part in the Hard Knock Life Tour, including a stop in Toronto at the Air Canada Centre.

In 2005, DJ Clue appeared as himself in the video game Grand Theft Auto: Liberty City Stories, hosting a fictional hip-hop radio station The Liberty Jam.

== Discography ==
=== Albums ===
- The Professional (1998)
- The Professional 2 (2001)
- The Professional 3 (2006)

=== Soundtracks ===
- DJ Clue? Presents: Backstage Mixtape (2000)

=== Remixes ===
- "Heartbreaker" (featuring Da Brat & Missy "Misdemeanor" Elliott) – Mariah Carey (1999)
- "Thank God I Found You/Make It Last Forever" (featuring Joe & Nas) – Mariah Carey (1999)
- "It's Gonna Be Me" – *NSYNC (2000)
- "Best of Me Part II" – Mýa (featuring Jay-Z) (2000)
- "U Remind Me " (featuring Blu Cantrell and Method Man)- Usher (2001)
- "Keeping It Gangsta" (featuring Styles P, Jadakiss, M.O.P.) - Fabolous (2001)
- "Overnight Celebrity" (featuring Kanye West, Cam'ron and 50 Cent) – Twista (2005)
- "Mesmerized" (featuring Nas) – Faith Evans (2005)
- "How to Deal" – Frankie J (2005)
- "We Belong Together" (featuring Styles P. and Jadakiss) – Mariah Carey (2005)
- "Shake It Off" (featuring Jay-Z and Young Jeezy) – Mariah Carey (2005)
- "One Wish" (featuring Fabolous) – Ray J (2005)
- "Don't Forget About Us" featuring Styles P. and Fabolous) – Mariah Carey (2006)
- "Ride for You" – Danity Kane (2006)
- "You Should Be My Girl" – Sammie (featuring Sean P) (2006)

== Production ==
- "From Marcy to Hollywood (feat. Sauce Money and Memphis Bleek) - Jay-Z (1998)
- "Thugs R Us" - Noreaga (1998)
- "Mathematics (Esta Loca)" [feat. DJ Clue] - Noreaga (1998)
- "Ryde or Die" (feat. Ruff Ryders) - 1999
- "Heartbreaker" (featuring Jay-Z) – Mariah Carey (1999)
- "Dope Man" – Jay-z (1999)
- "I'll Buss Em You Punish Em" (featuring Rakim) - Canibus (2000)
- "Superwoman Pt. II" (featuring Fabolous) – Lil' Mo (2001)
- "Fuck That" - Bathgate (2001)
- "So Hot" - Foxy Brown (2001)
- "We Got It All" - Ray J (2001)
- "Blood Type" - Tragedy Khadafi (2001)
- "Click & Spark"; "Keepin' It Gangsta"; "Ride for This" (feat. Ja Rule); "Trade It All" (feat. Jagged Edge); "Take You Home" (feat. Lil Mo)
- "Last Night a DJ Saved My Life" (featuring Busta Rhymes and Fabolous); "Dont Stop Funkin' 4 Jamaica" (feat. Mystikal) – Mariah Carey (2001)
- "Fresh From Yard" (featuring Lil Kim) - Beenie Man (2002)
- "We Thugs (My Niggas) [feat. The Lox] - Styles P (2002)
- "We Fly" (featuring Ja Rule, Lil Vita & Lil Mo) - DJ Envy (2003)
- "Up On Things" (feat. Snoop Dogg); "Into You (feat. Tamia); Throwback - Fabolous (2003)
- "Rich Friday" (featuring Future, Nicki Minaj, Juelz Santana & French Montana) – The Professional Pt. 4 (2013)
