= Desert Storm Records =

American record label

- Parent company: Universal Music Group
- Founded: 1998
- Founder: Skane Dolla; Ken Duro Ifill; DJ Clue?
- Distributor: Def Jam
- Genre: Hip-hop
- Country of origin: United States

Desert Storm Records is an American record label founded by DJ and record producer DJ Clue?, record producer and music engineer Ken Duro Ifill, and DJ Clue?'s music manager Richard "Skane Dolla" Ford in 1998. The label was formerly distributed through Elektra and Atlantic Records, subsidiaries of Warner Music Group, and later Def Jam, a subsidiary of Universal Music Group.

== History ==
Desert Storm Records was established in 1998 by DJ and record producer DJ Clue?, music engineer and producer Ken Duro Ifill, and their business partner and manager, Richard "Skane Dolla" Ford. Through his affiliation with Jay-Z, DJ Clue secured a joint venture arrangement involving Desert Storm, Jay-Z's Roc-A-Fella Records, and its distributor, Def Jam Recordings. The partnership provided Clue with an opportunity to expand his established mixtape brand into the commercial recording industry. At the time, Clue had developed a considerable reputation through his mixtapes, which were known for featuring exclusive recordings, unreleased music, and freestyles from prominent hip-hop artists. His signature DJ drops and ability to introduce emerging music helped establish him as one of New York's most influential DJs during the 1990s.

In 1998, Brooklyn-based rapper Fabolous Sport was invited to perform live on DJ Clue's radio show, Monday Night Mixtapes, on New York City radio station Hot 97. During the appearance, Fabolous freestyled alongside N.O.R.E. over the instrumental to The LOX's song "Money, Power & Respect". Impressed by his performance, DJ Clue signed him to Desert Storm the following day, making him one of the label's first artists after Clue himself. The label also signed Fabolous's brother and fellow rapper Muggs, who would later perform under his real name, Paul Cain.

Desert Storm's first release was DJ Clue's debut studio album, The Professional, released on December 15, 1998. Executive produced by Clue and Ifill, who also contributed production to the project, it marked the commercial recording debuts of Fabolous Sport and Muggs, with Fabolous appearing on two tracks. The album debuted and peaked in the top 30 on the Billboard 200 and number 3 on the Top R&B/Hip-Hop Albums chart. Although it did not produce any major charting singles, Clue's established reputation and ability to bring together prominent artists helped The Professional achieve commercial success. The album was initially certified gold by the RIAA in January 1999 before reaching platinum status in August 2001, making it the first platinum-certified album released by a DJ. Its success also helped demonstrate the commercial potential of translating the mixtape format into a major-label album release.

On February 27, 2001, DJ Clue released his second studio album, The Professional 2, through Island Def Jam, Roc-A-Fella Records, and Desert Storm Records. The album featured guest appearances from Desert Storm artists Fabolous and Muggs, while the majority of its production was handled by Clue and Ken "Duro" Ifill. The project also featured an extensive lineup of appearances from prominent hip-hop artists, continuing the collaborative approach established on its predecessor. Its lead single, "Back 2 Life 2001", helped promote the album ahead of its release. The Professional 2 debuted and peaked at number 3 on the Billboard 200, while also reaching number one on the Top R&B/Hip-Hop Albums chart. Despite achieving a higher peak position on the Billboard 200 than the original album, it did not match its predecessor's overall commercial performance and was certified gold by the RIAA on March 28, 2001. Nevertheless, its chart success further demonstrated DJ Clue's commercial appeal and helped maintain Desert Storm's presence in the hip-hop industry.

== Artists ==
- DJ Clue (Roc-A-Fella/Def Jam)
- Fabolous (Street Family/Def Jam)
- DJ Envy
- Red Cafe
- Muggs

=== Former ===
- Thara Prashad
- Joe Budden

== Discography ==
DJ Clue - The Professional

- Released: December 15, 1998
- Chart positions: #26 U.S. Billboard 200
- RIAA Certification: Platinum

DJ Clue - The Professional 2

- Released: February 27, 2001
- Chart positions: #3 U.S. Billboard 200
- RIAA Certification: Gold
- U.S. sales: 882,000

Fabolous - Ghetto Fabolous

- Released: September 11, 2001
- Chart positions: #4 U.S. Billboard 200
- RIAA Certification: Platinum
- U.S. sales: 143,180
- Singles: "Can't Deny It", "Young'n", "Trade It All"

DJ Envy - The Desert Storm Mixtape: Blok Party, Vol. 1

- Released: February 11, 2003
- Chart positions: #57 U.S. Billboard 200

Fabolous - Street Dreams

- Released: March 4, 2003
- Chart positions: #3 U.S. Billboard 200
- RIAA Certification: Platinum
- U.S. sales: 185,000
- Singles: "This Is My Party", "Can't Let You Go", "Into You", "Trade It All (Part 2)"

Fabolous - More Street Dreams, Pt. 2: The Mixtape

- Released: November 4, 2003
- Chart positions: #28 U.S. Billboard 200
- Singles: "Make U Mine", "Think Y'all Know"

Fabolous - Real Talk

- Released: November 9, 2004
- Chart positions: #6 U.S. Billboard 200
- RIAA Certification: Gold
- U.S. sales: 179,000
- Singles: "Breathe", "Baby", "Do the Damn Thing", "Tit 4 Tat", "Round and Round"

DJ Clue - The Professional 3

- Released: December 19, 2006
- Chart positions: #73 U.S. Billboard 200
- U.S. sales: 54,935
- Singles: "Like This", "Really Wanna Know You"

Fabolous - From Nothin' to Somethin'

- Released: June 12, 2007
- Chart positions: #2 U.S. Billboard 200
- RIAA Certification: Gold
- U.S. sales: 159,000
- Singles: "Diamonds", "Return of the Hustle", "Make Me Better", "Baby Don't Go"

Fabolous - Loso's Way

- Released: July 28, 2009
- Chart positions: #1 U.S. Billboard 200
- RIAA Certification: Gold
- U.S. sales: 199,000
- Singles: "Throw It in the Bag", "My Time", "Everything, Everyday, Everywhere", "Money Goes, Honey Stay (When the Money Goes Remix)", "Imma Do It"
