= 37th Young Artist Awards =

2016 US media awards ceremony

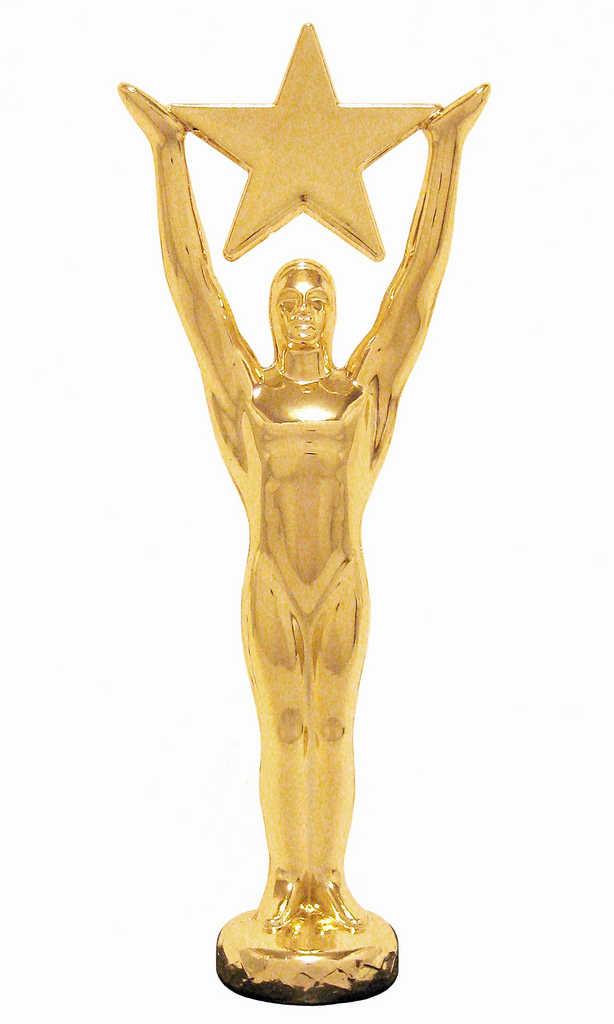
- Awarded for: Achievement during the year 2015 in film and television
- Date: March 13, 2016
- Site: Sportsmen's Lodge; Studio City, California
- Hosted by: Connor Long and Shelley Regner

The 37th Young Artist Awards ceremony, presented by the Young Artist Association, honored excellence of young performers between the ages of 5 and 18 in the fields of film, television, theatre and the internet for the 2015 calendar year. Winners were announced on March 13, 2016, at the annual ceremony and banquet luncheon held in the Empire Ballroom of the Sportsmen's Lodge in Studio City, California.

== Winners and nominees ==
★ Winners were announced on March 13, 2016.

=== Best Performance in a Feature Film ===
Best Performance in a Feature Film – Leading Young Actor (10 and under)	Best Performance in a Feature Film – Leading Young Actress (13 and under)
★ Jared Breeze – The Boy: Carsen Warner – Lovesick; Jacob Tremblay – Room; Jakob Salvati – Little Boy; Kyle Catlett – The Young and Prodigious T.S. Spivet	★ Quinn McColgan – Extinction: Ivy George – Paranormal Activity: The Ghost Dimension; Kaitlin Cheung – Where Love Found Me; Katelyn Mager – Charlotte's Song; Kennedi Clements – Poltergeist; Zoe Fraser – Bark Ranger
Best Performance in a Feature Film – Leading Young Actor (11–13)	Best Performance in a Feature Film – Leading Young Actress (14–21)
★ Steele Stebbins – Vacation: Emjay Anthony – Krampus; Joshua Rush – Break Point; Levi Miller – Pan; Onni Tommila – Big Game; Ty Simpkins – Jurassic World	★ Liv Southard – Breaking Legs: Abigail Breslin – Maggie; Chanel Marriott – Alison's Choice; Elle Fanning – Trumbo; Odeya Rush – Goosebumps; Olivia DeJonge – The Visit
Best Performance in a Feature Film – Leading Young Actor (14–21)	Best Performance in a Feature Film – Supporting Young Actress (13 and under)
★ Michael Grant – Where Hope Grows: Abraham Attah – Beasts of No Nation; Josh Wiggins – Max	★ Isabella Crovetti – Joy: Giselle Eisenberg – Danny Collins; Hannah Alligood – Paper Towns; Isabella Kai Rice – Jem and the Holograms; Ripley Sobo – Steve Jobs
Best Performance in a Feature Film – Supporting Young Actor (13 and under)	Best Performance in a Feature Film – Supporting Young Actress (14–21)
★ Aiden Lovekamp – Pawn Sacrifice: Christian Isaiah – Ambivalent Hope: A Gun and a Prayer; Jack Fulton – Pay the Ghost; Jet Jurgensmeyer – Woodlawn; Kyle Catlett – Poltergeist; Milo Parker – Mr. Holmes; Tate Berney – Insidious: Chapter 3	★ Niamh Wilson – The Young and Prodigious T.S. Spivet: Bella Thorne – The DUFF; Saxon Sharbino – Poltergeist
Best Performance in a Feature Film – Supporting Young Actor (14–21)	
★ Forrest Goodluck – The Revenant: Jacob Lofland – Maze Runner: The Scorch Trials; Tom Holland – In the Heart of the Sea; Zach Louis – Marshall's Miracle

=== Best Performance in a Short Film ===
Best Performance in a Short Film – Young Actor (10 and under)	Best Performance in a Short Film – Young Actress (10 and under)
★ Michael Berthold – Billy the Fetus: Joshua Kaufman – Have You Seen Calvin?; Sean Quan – Mattress	★ Savannah Liles – Big Sister: Allison Augustin – Muna; Carissa Bazler – The Grim Reaper's Daughter; Kacey Fifield – The Lemonade Wars; Kelea Skelton – Mermaid; Maia Costea – The Candy Girl; Mila Brener – Superkid
Best Performance in a Short Film – Young Actor (11–13)	Best Performance in a Short Film – Young Actress (11–13)
★ Jakob Wedel – Real Boy: Logan Reinhart – Christine; Nicholas Neve – Standing Up	★ Keely Wilson – Until Tomorrow: Isabella Bazler – Recovery; Katelyn Mager – Date-O-Phobe; Molly Jackson – Penny for Your Thoughts
Best Performance in a Short Film – Young Actor (14–21)	Best Performance in a Short Film – Young Actress (14–21)
★ Robin de Zwart – Circular: Adam Murciano – Nicholas & the Poet; Connor Long – Menschen; Daniel Rövira – Imagination of Young; Joshua Costea – Date-O-Phobe	★ Megan Ashley Brown – Until Tomorrow: Cassidy Mack – Two Secrets; Jolie Vanier – Miscomunication; Rachel Durose – The Deepest Cut; Tiffany Dion – Dragon Child

=== Best Performance in a TV Movie, Miniseries, Special or Pilot ===
Best Performance in a TV Movie, Miniseries, Special or Pilot – Young Actor	Best Performance in a TV Movie, Miniseries, Special or Pilot – Young Actress
★ Forrest Deal – Dolly Parton's Coat of Many Colors: Dalton Cyr – A History of Radness; Graham Verchere – A Perfect Wedding; Isaak Presley – A History of Radness; Khalid Alzouma – The Slap; Kolton Stewart – Angels in the Snow; Owen Tanzer – The Slap; Rio Mangini – One Crazy Cruise; Tate Berney – The Right Girl	★ Nicole Samantha Huff – Degrasssi: Don't Look Back: Cecilia Balagot – A History of Radness; Genea Charpentier – Run for Your Life; Hannah Cheramy – October Kiss; Peyton Kennedy – Murdoch Mysteries: A Merry Murdoch Christmas; Savannah McReynolds – By God's Grace; Marlhy Murphy – A History of Radness; Jordyn Ashley Olson – The Unauthorized Full House Story; Danika Yarosh – Heroes Reborn

=== Best Performance in a TV Series ===
Best Performance in a TV Series – Leading Young Actor (13 and under)	Best Performance in a TV Series – Leading Young Actress (13 and under)
★ Sloane Morgan Siegel – Gortimer Gibbon's Life on Normal Street: Gabe Eggerling – The Kicks; Hunter Fischer – The Midnight Anthology; Jake Goodman – Max and Shred; Jude Wright – Spy; Pierce Gagnon – Extant; Sean Michael Kyer – Odd Squad	★ Layla Crawford – The First Family: Madison Ferguson – The Stanley Dynamic; Olivia Sanabia – Just Add Magic
Best Performance in a TV Series – Leading Young Actor (14–21)	Best Performance in a TV Series – Leading Young Actress (14–21)
★ Rhys Matthew Bond – Ties That Bind: Jadiel Dowlin – Annedroids; Kolton Stewart – Some Assembly Required; Marcus Scribner – Black-ish; Ryan Cargill – WITS Academy; Sean Giambrone – The Goldbergs	★ Johnnie Ladd – Table 58: Emilia McCarthy – Max and Shred; Mika Abdalla – Project Mc²; Paris Smith – Every Witch Way
Best Performance in a TV Series – Supporting Young Actor	Best Performance in a TV Series – Supporting Young Actress
★ Miles Brown – Black-ish: Albert Tsai – Dr. Ken; Graham Verchere – Once Upon a Time; Ian Chen – Fresh Off the Boat	★ Marsai Martin – Black-ish: Adrianna Di Liello – Annedroids; Genneya Walton – Project Mc²; Kylie Rogers – The Whispers; Victoria Vida – Project Mc²; Ysa Penarejo – Project Mc²
Best Performance in a TV Series – Guest Starring Young Actor (10 and under)	Best Performance in a TV Series – Guest Starring Young Actress (10 and under)
★ Samuel Faraci – Saving Hope: Elisha Henig – CSI: Cyber; Jack McGraw – Workaholics; Keith L. Williams – The Goldbergs; Madison Rojas – Jane the Virgin; Zachary Haven – Blood Relatives	★ Mila Brener – Mutt & Stuff: Gracyn Shinyei – Supernatural; Laya DeLeon Hayes – The Haunted Hathaways; Siena Agudong – Nicky, Ricky, Dicky & Dawn
Best Performance in a TV Series – Guest Starring Young Actor (11–13)	Best Performance in a TV Series – Guest Starring Young Actress (11–13)
★ Graham Verchere – Impastor: Logan Guleff – MasterChef Junior; Trevor Larcom – Scorpion	★ Piper Madison – 100 Things to Do Before High School: Laura Krystine – Fresh Off the Boat; Zoe Fraser – Murdoch Mysteries
Best Performance in a TV Series – Guest Starring Young Actor (14–21)	Best Performance in a TV Series – Guest Starring Young Actress (14–21)
★ Christian Hutcherson – Survivor's Remorse: Jake Elliott – The Night Shift; Zach Callison – Henry Danger	★ Mandalynn Carlson – Grey's Anatomy: Brielle Barbusca – Bones; Danika Yarosh – Law & Order: Special Victims Unit; Ekeme Ekanem – Married; Leah Lewis – Gamer's Guide to Pretty Much Everything; Lexi DiBenedetto – Instant Mom; Madison Grace – Law & Order: Special Victims Unit; Stephanie Katherine Grant – Survivor's Remorse
Best Performance in a TV Series – Recurring Young Actor (13 and under)	Best Performance in a TV Series – Recurring Young Actress (13 and under)
★ Rio Mangini – Bella and the Bulldogs: Elisha Henig – Nicky, Ricky, Dicky & Dawn; Jordan Poole – Mr. D; Major Dodson – The Walking Dead; Steele Stebbins – Crazy Ex-Girlfriend; Tate Yap – Odd Squad; Thomas Barbusca – American Horror Story "Hotel"; Trevor Larcom – True Detective	★ Laura Krystine – 100 Things to Do Before High School: Brooklyn Rae Silzer – General Hospital; Gabrielle Trudel – Haven; Kassidy Mattera – Mr. D; McKenna Roberts – The Young and the Restless; Peyton Kennedy – Odd Squad; Sunnie Pelant – Bones
Best Performance in a TV Series – Recurring Young Actor (14–21)	Best Performance in a TV Series – Recurring Young Actress (14–21)
★ Matt Cornett – Bella and the Bulldogs: Joey Luthman – General Hospital; Myles Erlick – The Next Step; Nicolas Fontaine – 30 Vies; Quinn Lord – The Man in the High Castle; Richard Walters – Degrassi: The Next Generation	★ Luna Blaise – Fresh Off the Boat: Emily Robinson – Transparent; Katelyn Nacon – The Walking Dead; Madison Lintz – Bosch; Maureen Adelson – 30 Vies; Olivia Steele Falconer – Once Upon a Time; Stephanie Janusauskas – This Life

=== Best Performance in a TV Commercial ===
Best Performance in a TV Commercial – Young Actor/Actress

★ Christian Ganiere – Subaru Jr. Driver

- Thomas Barbusca – Geico Peter Pan Reunion
- Alyssa Cross – HSBC Bank The Invitation
- Logan Guleff – Olive Garden Appetizer
- Olivia Sanabia – Dairy Queen Rolo Minis Blizzard
- Thunder Squad Drumline – ESPN Black History Lead Commercial
- Keith L Williams – Chex Fort Green Sheets vs Castle Brave Storm

=== Outstanding Young Ensemble Cast in a TV Series ===
Outstanding Young Ensemble Cast in a TV Series

★ Fresh Off The Boat – Hudson Yang, Forrest Wheeler and Ian Chen

- Black-ish – Marcus Scribner, Yara Shahidi, Miles Brown and Marsai Martin
- Nicky, Ricky, Dicky & Dawn – Lizzy Greene, Aidan Gallagher, Casey Simpson and Mace Coronel
- Odd Squad – Dalila Bela, Filip Geljo, Millie Davis and Sean Michael Kyer
- The Fosters – Hayden Byerly, Jake T. Austin and Gavin MacIntosh

=== Outstanding Young Ensemble Cast in a Web or VOD Series ===
Outstanding Young Ensemble Cast in a Web or VOD Series

★ A History of Radness – Marlhy Murphy, Isaak Presley, Cecilia Balagot and Dalton Cyr

- Annedroids – Addison Holley, Jadiel Dowlin, Adrianna Di Liello and Millie Davis
- Blooob – Justin Galluccio and Zane Huett
- Gortimer Gibbon's Life on Normal Street – Sloane Morgan Siegel, Drew Justice and Ashley Boettcher
- Project Mc^{2} – Mika Abdalla, Ysa Penarejo, Victoria Vida and Genneya Walton

=== Best Performance in a Voice-Over Role ===
Best Performance in a Voice–Over Role – Young Actor (11 and under)	Best Performance in a Voice–Over Role – Young Actress (11 and under)
★ Zachary Haven – Pearly Gates: Devan Cohen – PAW Patrol; Gabe Eggerling – Die drei Räuber; Jaxon Mercey – Daniel Tiger's Neighborhood; Jet Jurgensmeyer – Bubble Guppies	★ Ava Priestley – Wishenpoof!: Brooke Wolloff – Tumble Leaf; Chelsea Miller – Barbie & Her Sisters in the Great Puppy Adventure; Darielle Stewart – Whisker Haven Tales with the Palace Pets; Isabella Crovetti – Shimmer and Shine; Laya DeLeon Hayes – Doc McStuffins; Nicole Taylor Wedel – Harvey Beaks
Best Performance in a Voice–Over Role – Young Actor (12–21)	Best Performance in a Voice–Over Role – Young Actress (12–21)
★ Graham Verchere – My Little Pony: Friendship Is Magic: Elijha Hammill – PAW Patrol; Marcus Scribner – The Good Dinosaur; Reese Hartwig – Tom and Jerry: Spy Quest; Zac McDowell – Tumble Leaf	★ Kaitlyn Dias – Inside Out: Addison Holley – Wishenpoof!; Amariah Faulkner – Assassin's Creed: Syndicate; Bailey Gambertoglio – Bubble Guppies; Hannah Swain – Ruff-Ruff Tweet and Dave; Hope Cassandra – Wishenpoof!; Nicole Tompkins – Antboy: Revenge of the Red Fury

=== Best Performance in a Film for DVD ===
Best Performance in a Film for DVD – Young Actor	Best Performance in a Film for DVD – Young Actress
★ Toby Nichols – Chasing Ghosts: John Paul Ruttan – Shelby; Will Spencer – Ghost Squad	★ Mandalynn Carlson – A Horse for Summer: Annabelle Roberts – Further Instructions; Cassidy Mack – Zoey to the Max; Laci Kay – Midlife

=== Best Web Performance ===
Best Web Performance – Young Actor	Best Web Performance – Young Actress
★ Brice Fisher – Between 2 Phat Kids: Christian Ganiere – Reaper Tales; Lucas Barker – Dogs & Me; Max Geschwind – WeHo Politics with Max Geschwind; Noah Schnacky – HitStreak	★ Mila Brener – Hopeless Bromantic: Amanda Buhs – The Deadersons; Elise Luthman – Short Girls Club; Kacey Fifield – Clique Wars; Molly Jackson – The Magnificent Life of Meg; Taylor Blackwell – Tweet: The Series; Tori Griffith – The Fergusons

=== Best Performance in Live Theater ===
Best Performance in Live Theater – Young Actor	Best Performance in Live Theater – Young Actress
★ Exodus Lale – The Lion King • Regent Theatre, Melbourne: Mathew Edmondson – High School Musical • First Act Youth Company; Julien Hicks – The Singing Butler • Ghost Light Projects; Gavin Morales – Right Behind You • Gala de Danza; Matthew Nardozzi – Irving Berlin and Co. • 13th Street Theater; Carson Reaume – The Heart of Robin Hood • Royal Alexandra Theatre, Toronto; Valin Shinyei – A Christmas Story-The Musical • Vancouver Arts Club	★ Eva de Zwart – The Velveteen Rabbit • Island Discovery Learning Community Theatre, Bowen Island: Abigail Wolff – Leading Ladies • Black Box Theater, MA; Anna Claire Bartlam – White Christmas • Dunfield Theatre, Cambridge; Courtney Lynne Coleman – The Backdoor Draft Improv Group • London, Ontario; Madeline Lupi – Mother Goosed • Tuxedo Park School Drama Club, NJ; Samantha Hodges – The Lady From The Sea • Collaborative Artists Ensemble, CA; Sydney Mikayla – Pino, A Pinocchio Story • Amazing Grace Conservatory, CA
