= Sonaro =

- Also known as: Sonaro
- Born: Christopher Darnell Cook; October 5, 1988 (age 38); Far Rockaway, Queens, New York City, New York, U.S.
- Origin: Brooklyn, New York City, New York, U.S.
- Genres: Hip hop, R&B, Pop
- Occupation: Record producer
- Instruments: Keyboard, drum machine, sampler
- Years active: 2010–present
- Labels: Street Family, Def Jam
- Website: Official Website

Christopher Darnell Cook (born October 5, 1988), professionally known as Sonaro, is an American music producer from Far Rockaway, New York. He is perhaps best known for producing songs for Brooklyn-bred rapper Fabolous. He has also produced for several other rappers, such as French Montana, Jeezy, Jadakiss, Styles P, Flipp Dinero, Lloyd Banks, Paul Cain, Prodigy, Jim Jones, and Meek Mill.

== Life and career ==
=== Early life and career beginnings ===
Sonaro was born in Far Rockaway and raised in Brooklyn. Interested in music production from an early age, Sonaro became an in-house producer for Needlz where he learned to craft his sound. During this time, Sonaro landed his first placement on Stack Bundles Biddin' War Vol 2. hosted by DJ Clue, producing the song "Rockin' it” featuring Jim Jones and Max B. Sonaro soon followed this up with "Thang On Me" from Lil' Kim’s Ms. G.O.A.T. project, which featured Maino, Mister Cee, and Sha Dash.

=== Commercial Breakthrough ===
On March 5, 2010, Fabolous and DJ Drama released the mixtape There Is No Competition 2: The Funeral Service which featured the Sonaro produced street single "Body Ya." The song was quickly added to Hot 97, and Def Jam officially released the song on There Is No Competition 2: The Grieving Music EP. The EP featured additionally production from Sonaro, and new contributions from Lex Luger, Ryan Leslie, and Jahlil Beats.

Later work with Fabolous from this period includes "Leaving You," "Swag Champ," "B.E.T." featuring Jadakiss and Styles P, and "Want You Back" featuring Joe Budden and Teyana Taylor. Sonaro also contributed production to projects by Lloyd Banks, Jim Jones, Nya Lee, Meek Mill, and French Montana, and licensed several instrumentals for the TV show Love & Hip Hop.

=== The S.O.U.L. Tape 3 ===
On December 25, 2013 Fabolous released The S.O.U.L. Tape 3 which featured Sonaro on three songs; "Playa," "Situationships" featuring Mack Wilds, and "Cuffin' Season." "Cuffin' Season" was instantly added to radio and received major press from Hot 97's Funkmaster Flex who called it "the hottest record in the Big Apple."

The official video for "Cuffin' Season" premiered on REVOLT on April 25, 2014, and features Sonaro performing the chorus alongside Fabolous.

=== Summertime Shootout ===
On November 26, 2015 Fabolous released Summertime Shootout. The project contains four songs produced by Sonaro; "For The Summer," "Vanilla" featuring Rich Homie Quan, "Motivation," and "The Plug."

On November 27, the music video for the Sonaro produced "The Plug" was released exclusively to World Star Hip Hop and gained over 1,800,000 views in less one day.

== Partial discography ==
2023

- "Selfish (Freestyle)" by Fabolous
- "Underdog Season" by Connie Diiamond

2022

- "Bach 2 Bach" by Fabolous and Dave East

2019

- "1 Time" by Jeezy

2018

- "IDW2K" by A Boogie, Pretty Lou, and Angelica Villa
- "So Cold" by Flipp Dinero

2017

- "Happy April Fools" and "La Tonta De Abril" by Karen Rodriguez

2016

- "To The Sky" by Fabolous featuring 070 Shake
- "For The Family" by Fabolous featuring Dave East and Don Q

2015

- "For The Summer" by Fabolous
- "Motivation" by Fabolous
- "Vanilla" by Fabolous featuring Rich Homie Quan
- "The Plug" by Fabolous
- "How U Luv Dat" by Fat Joe featuring Troy Ave and Sonaro
- "On The Line" by Audubon
- "I Used To" by Dave East

2014

- "Last Night" by Jim Jones featuring Jadakiss and Sonaro
- "Cuffin' Season (Remix)" by Fabolous featuring 50 Cent and Sonaro

2013

- "Cuffin' Season" by Fabolous featuring Sonaro
- "Situationships" by Fabolous featuring Mack Wilds and Tiara Thomas
- "Playa" by Fabolous
- "F.O.H." by DJ Prostyle featuring Fabolous and French Montana
- "Gotta Love That" and "Love Blazin'" by Nya Lee
- "Ride Like This" by Omelly (Dream Chasers Records)
- "211" by Bynoe featuring Prodigy
- "Always On Broadway" by Jim Jones

2012

- "Want You Back" by Fabolous featuring Joe Budden and Teyana Taylor
- "Wake Up" by Lloyd Banks

2011

- "Swag Champ" by Fabolous
- "B.E.T." by Fabolous featuring Jadakiss and Styles P
- "Young Fly Flashy" by Lloyd Banks
- "Leaving You" by Fabolous

2010

- "Body Ya" by Fabolous
- "Body Count" by Fabolous
