= Derrick Tseng =

American film producer

- Born: United States
- Occupation: Film Producer

Derrick Tseng is an American independent film producer based in New York City. Following graduate work in literature and a brief career as a writer and editor in school book publishing, he transitioned to film, first as a lighting technician, then as a line producer and first assistant director. In the 1990s, he moved up the ranks of the New York independent film world, eventually establishing himself as a producer. Since 2001, Tseng has been a frequent collaborator of filmmakers David Gordon Green (All the Real Girls, Snow Angels, Prince Avalanche, Joe, Manglehorn) and Todd Solondz (Palindromes, Life During Wartime, Dark Horse, Wiener-Dog).

== Filmography ==
- Father Mother Sister Brother (2025)
- Janet Planet (2023)
- Goodnight Mommy (2022)
- The Evening Hour (2020)
- Cunningham (2019)
- Brian Banks (2018)
- Then Came You (2018)
- An Actor Prepares (2018)
- Wiener-Dog (2016)
- Manglehorn (2015)
- Red Oaks (2014)
- Revenge of the Green Dragons (2014)
- Joe (2014)
- Prince Avalanche (2013)
- Dark Horse (2011)
- Almost Perfect (2011)
- Fighting Fish (2010)
- Life During Wartime (2009)
- Henry May Long (2008)
- Choke (2008)
- The Ten (2007)
- Snow Angels (2007)
- Stella (2005)
- Lonesome Jim (2005)
- Tanner on Tanner (2004)
- Palindromes (2004)
- All the Real Girls (2003)
- Party Monster (2003)
- Maryam (2002)
- Face (2002)
- Tart (2001)
- The Business of Strangers (2001)
- Super Troopers (2001)
- Signs & Wonders (2000)
- Happy Accidents (2000)
- Cry Baby Lane (2000)
- Freak Talks About Sex (1999)
- Cross Words (1999)
- Vig (1998)
- Stag (1997)
- Under the Bridge (1997)
- Chasing Amy (1997)
- Grind (1996)
- Sudden Manhattan (1996)
- Palookaville (1995)
