= Todd Solondz =

American filmmaker

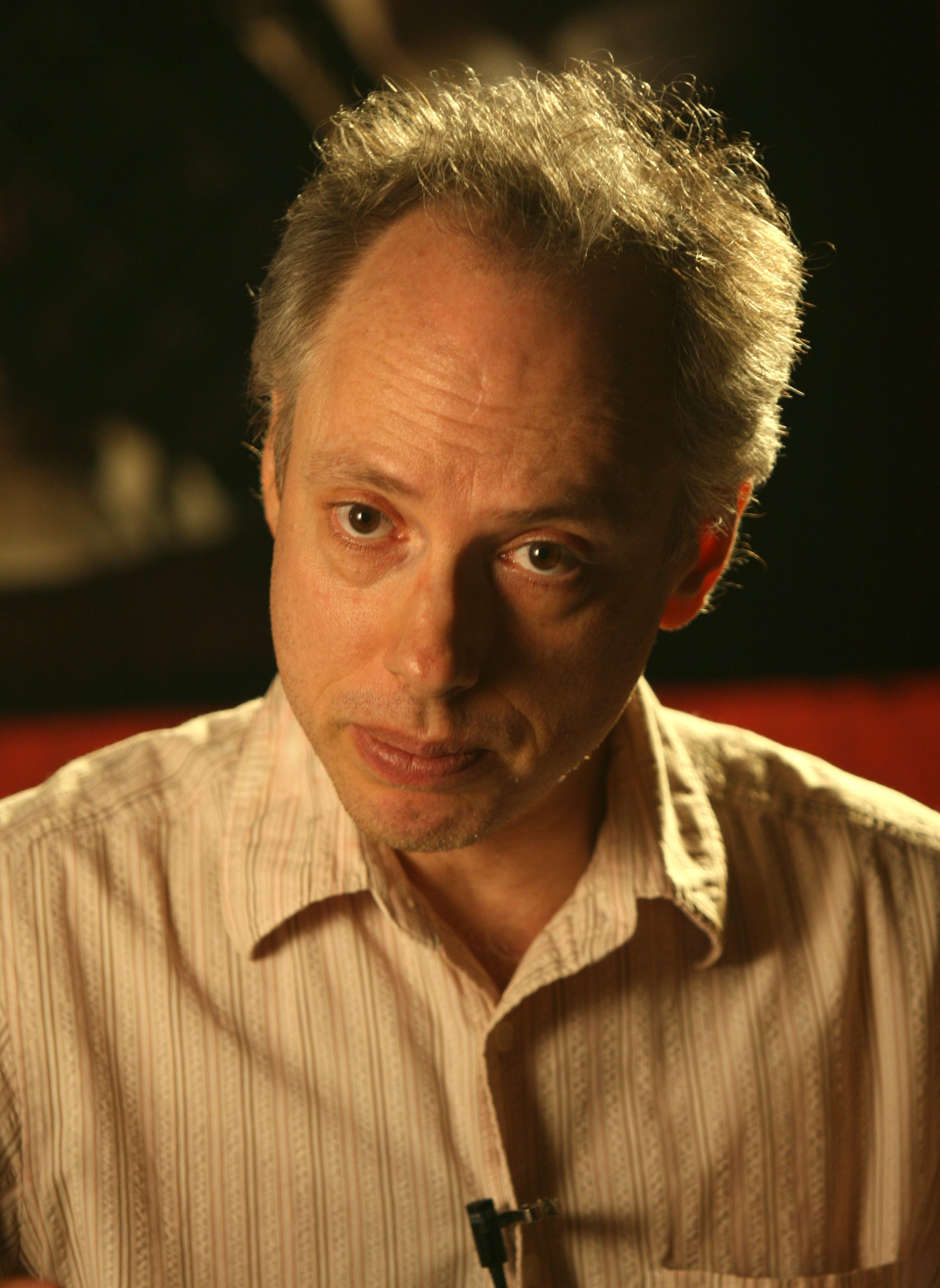
- Solondz in 2009
- Born: October 15, 1959 (age 67); Newark, New Jersey, U.S.
- Education: Yale University
- Occupations: Filmmaker; playwright; professor
- Years active: 1984–present
- Children: 2

Todd Solondz (/ˈsoʊləndz/; born October 15, 1959) is an American filmmaker and playwright known for his style of dark, socially conscious satire. Solondz's work has received critical acclaim for its commentary on the "dark underbelly of middle class American suburbia", a reflection of his own background in New Jersey. His work includes Welcome to the Dollhouse (1995), Happiness (1998), Storytelling (2001), Palindromes (2004), Life During Wartime (2009), Dark Horse (2011), and Wiener-Dog (2016). He is also a professor at New York University.

== Background ==
Solondz was born in 1959 in Newark, New Jersey, and grew up in its nearby suburbs. He wrote several screenplays while working as a delivery boy for the Writers Guild of America. Solondz earned his undergraduate degree in English from Yale and attended New York University's Master of Fine Arts program in film and television, but did not complete a degree.

During the early 1990s, Solondz worked at NYANA as a teacher of English as a second language to Russian immigrants in New York City and described the experience as positive.

Solondz is a Jewish atheist. In The A.V. Club's article "Is There a God?", he answered the question "Well, me, I'm an atheist, so I don't really believe there is. But I suppose I could be proven wrong."

As of 2024, Solondz lives in New York City, in Greenwich Village. He and his wife have two children.

== Career ==
=== 1980s ===
Solondz's student short film Schatt's Last Shot was produced in 1985, and was shown at least once in 1986. The title character is a high schooler who wants to get into Stanford University, but his gym teacher hates him. The teacher fails him because he cannot make a shot in basketball. He has no luck with the girl of his dreams, but he wishes he was more like the coach, whom he challenges to a game of one-on-one.

In 1989 Solondz wrote and directed Fear, Anxiety & Depression, an episodic comedy about fledgling playwright Ira (played by Solondz) and his frustrating interactions with women. The film contains several musical interludes, including three songs written for the film. Stanley Tucci appears in one of his early roles as an old, disliked acquaintance of Ira, who takes up playwriting on a whim and becomes the toast of Off-Broadway.

=== 1990s ===
The frustrations of his first feature led Solondz to swear off further involvement with the industry. More than five years later, an attorney friend urged Solondz to give filmmaking another go, and promised partial finance for any project Solondz came up with. The result was 1995's Welcome to the Dollhouse, which went on to win the Grand Jury Prize at the Sundance Film Festival. The dark comedy follows the travails of Dawn Wiener, a bespectacled, toothy, and shy 7th-grade girl who is mercilessly teased at school and treated to alternating contempt and neglect at home. It was distinct from most earlier films about adolescent abuse due to its complex characterization. It gave a balanced and sometimes sympathetic portrayal of the bully antagonist Brandon, and its depiction of Dawn, the ostensible protagonist and victim of the story, showed her as deeply flawed and sometimes cruel and selfish. The film was a major success among critics, and a moderate success at the box office. It was a festival hit, with screenings all over the world.

Solondz's next piece was Happiness (1998), a highly controversial film due to the themes explored in it, which range from rape, pedophilia, incest, suicide, and murder to a bizarre sexual phone caller. After the original distributor October Films dropped it, the film was distributed by Good Machine Releasing. The movie received numerous awards, including International Critics' Prize at the Cannes Film Festival, and yielded strong critical praise for Solondz.

=== 2000s ===
In 2001, Solondz released Storytelling, which premiered at the 2001 Cannes Film Festival. It is a film separated into two parts, entitled "Fiction" and "Nonfiction." The two stories share two thematic elements, but deal with each in an autonomous manner. Solondz used this format because he wanted to "find a fresh structure, a fresh form, and a different way of tackling what may be identical geographical material." When Solondz initially presented the film to the MPAA, he was told that if he wished to receive a rating other than NC-17, he would have to remove a scene of explicit sex involving a white female and a black male. However, a clause in Solondz's contract allowed him to cover part of the actors with a bright red box. "For me it's a great victory to have a big red box, the first red box in any studio feature [...] it's right in your face: You're not allowed to see this in our country." Solondz did, however, remove a portion of the film (which has variously been reported as either a subplot of the second story, or a third story entirely) which contained a sex scene involving two male actors (one of whom was James Van Der Beek).

Solondz's next film, Palindromes (2004), raised the eyebrows of many pundits and reviewers due to its themes of child molestation, statutory rape and abortion. Like all of Solondz's previous films, Palindromes is set in suburban New Jersey. It was released unrated in the US.

Life During Wartime (formerly known as Forgiveness) was produced by John Hart and Evamere Entertainment and released in 2009. Solondz said the film is a companion piece to Happiness and Welcome to the Dollhouse. Life During Wartime has characters in common with the two earlier films, but played by different actors and with loose continuity. Information about the characters in the film, and their differences from those of its predecessor Happiness, first emerged in August 2009. The film features Ally Sheedy, Renée Taylor, Paul Reubens, Ciarán Hinds, Shirley Henderson, Michael Lerner, Michael Kenneth Williams, Charlotte Rampling, Allison Janney, Rich Pecci and Chris Marquette.

The film debuted at the Telluride Film Festival in September 2009; it was nominated for the Golden Lion at the Venice Film Festival in August–September 2009, and it won the Osella award there for Best Screenplay.

In 2009, Solondz became an adjunct professor on the faculty of New York University's Tisch School of the Arts. As of 2024, he is a tenured professor teaching classes on writing and directing.

=== 2010s ===
In July 2010, Solondz completed the script of his next film, Dark Horse, which was filmed in the fall of 2010. To Solondz's surprise, the Creative Artists Agency appreciated the script, the first time for a movie of his. Solondz commented that he realized this is because "there's no rape, there's no child molestation, there's no masturbation, and then I thought, "oh my god, why didn't I think of this years ago?"

On September 5, 2011, Dark Horse was presented at the Venice Film Festival. On October 14, 2011, Dark Horse made its European premiere at the BFI London Film Festival. The film received a mixed reception. On April 23, 2012, Dark Horse was announced as the Closing Night selection for Maryland Film Festival 2012.

Wiener-Dog premiered at Sundance 2016. The film tells the story of a dog, as she travels from home to home. Amazon purchased the film at the festival. Starring an ensemble cast led by Ellen Burstyn, Kieran Culkin, Julie Delpy, Danny DeVito, Greta Gerwig, Tracy Letts, and Zosia Mamet, the film serves as a spin-off from Solondz's 1995 film Welcome to the Dollhouse, which also features the character of Dawn Wiener. It was released in the US on June 24, 2016, to positive reviews.

In 2017, it was reported that Penélope Cruz and Edgar Ramírez were attached to star Solondz's next film Love Child.

In 2018, Solondz premiered his debut play, titled Emma and Max. The production began previews October 1, opened on October 14, and ran through November 4. It starred Ilana Becker, Zonya Love, Matt Servitto, and Rita Wolf.

In May 2019, Solondz spent a week as the filmmaker in residence at the Centre for Film and Screen at the University of Cambridge.

=== 2020s ===
In 2021, Solondz was in the process of arranging financing for Love Child. He described the project as "my first movie with a plot and my first movie taking place in Texas", shaped by the Hollywood films that made him want to become a filmmaker. At this time, Rachel Weisz and Colin Farrell were announced to star as the leads, in place of Cruz and Ramírez.

By 2024, it was reported that Charles Melton and Elizabeth Olsen were now cast to star in the main roles. Principal photography was scheduled to begin in late 2024 in New York City and Texas, but in June, the production was abruptly cancelled due to lack of funding.

== Filmography ==
=== As director ===
Year	Title	Director	Writer	Producer
Features
1989	Fear, Anxiety & Depression	Yes	Yes	No
1995	Welcome to the Dollhouse	Yes	Yes	Yes
1998	Happiness	Yes	Yes	No
2001	Storytelling	Yes	Yes	No
2004	Palindromes	Yes	Yes	No
2009	Life During Wartime	Yes	Yes	No
2011	Dark Horse	Yes	Yes	No
2016	Wiener-Dog	Yes	Yes	No
TBA	Frappuccino	Yes	Yes	No
Shorts
1984	Feelings	Yes	Yes	Yes
1984	Babysitter	Yes	Yes	Yes
1986	Schatt's Last Shot	Yes	Yes	Yes

=== As actor ===
Year	Title	Role
1984	Feelings	Sensitive Young Man
1987	In Transit	Musician
1988	Married to the Mob	The Zany Reporter
1986	Schatt's Last Shot	Ira Ellis
1989	Fear, Anxiety & Depression	Ira Ellis
1997	As Good as It Gets	Man on Bus
1998	Happiness	Doorman

== Recurring characters ==
Character	Welcome to the Dollhouse (1995)	Happiness (1998)	Storytelling (2001)	Palindromes (2004)	Life During Wartime (2009)	Dark Horse (2011)	Wiener-Dog (2016)
Dawn Wiener	Heather Matarazzo			Mentioned			Greta Gerwig
Brandon McCarthy	Brendan Sexton III						Kieran Culkin
Mark Wiener	Matthew Faber			Matthew Faber	Rich Pecci		
Missy Wiener	Daria Kalinina			Mentioned			
Marj Wiener	Angela Pietropinto			Angela Pietropinto	Mentioned		
Harvey Wiener	Bill Buell			Bill Buell	Michael Lerner		
Tommy McCarthy	Tommy Fager						Connor Long
Joy Jordan		Jane Adams			Shirley Henderson		
Andy Kornbluth		Jon Lovitz			Paul Reubens		
Allen Mellencamp		Philip Seymour Hoffman			Michael K. Williams		
Bill Maplewood		Dylan Baker			Ciarán Hinds		
Helen Jordan		Lara Flynn Boyle			Ally Sheedy		
Timmy Maplewood		Justin Elven			Dylan Riley Snyder		
Trish Jordan Maplewood		Cynthia Stevenson			Allison Janney		
Chloe Maplewood		Lila Glantzman-Leib			Emma Hinz		
Billy Maplewood		Rufus Read			Chris Marquette		
Mona Jordan		Louise Lasser			Renée Taylor		
Miranda Vi			Selma Blair			Selma Blair	
Jiminy				Tyler Maynard		Tyler Maynard	Tyler Maynard

== Themes ==
Solondz has included portraits of and some satire of Jews and Jewish life in his work. Set in Florida, Life During Wartime portrayed pro-Israel activists. Set in New Jersey, Welcome to the Dollhouse included traditional-Jewish-influenced music befitting a bar mitzvah being played at a wedding anniversary party.

== Awards ==
In 2007, Solondz was honored with the Filmmaker on the Edge Award at the Provincetown International Film Festival.
