= Life During Wartime (film) =

2009 film by Todd Solondz

- Theatrical release poster
- Directed by: Todd Solondz
- Written by: Todd Solondz
- Produced by: Derrick Tseng; Christine K. Walker; Elizabeth Redleaf
- Starring: Shirley Henderson; Ciarán Hinds; Allison Janney; Michael Lerner; Chris Marquette; Rich Pecci; Charlotte Rampling; Paul Reubens; Ally Sheedy; Dylan Riley Snyder; Renée Taylor; Michael K. Williams
- Cinematography: Ed Lachman
- Edited by: Kevin Messman
- Music by: Marc Shaiman
- Production company: Werc Werk Works
- Distributed by: IFC Films
- Release dates: September 3, 2009 (Venice); July 23, 2010 (United States)
- Running time: 97 minutes
- Country: United States
- Language: English
- Budget: $4.5 million
- Box office: $744,816

Life During Wartime is a 2009 American comedy-drama film written and directed by filmmaker Todd Solondz. The film is a loose sequel to his 1998 film Happiness and 1995 film Welcome to the Dollhouse, with new actors playing the same characters.

Life During Wartime premiered at the 2009 Venice Film Festival, where it won the Golden Osella award for Best Screenplay.

== Plot ==
The plot revolves around the Jordan sisters: Trish, Joy, and Helen. Joy has married Helen's former neighbor, Allen Mellencamp, who continues to struggle with his compulsion to make obscene phone calls.

Trish has been raising her three children, Billy (now off at college), Timmy and Chloe. She has begun dating recently divorced Harvey Weiner, who she hopes is normal. Trish's ex-husband, Bill, has been released from prison after serving a sentence for child molestation, and heads to Florida to find out how his family, particularly his eldest son, are doing. He finds brief solace in a one-night stand with Jacqueline, a self-described "monster", as filled with loneliness and self-hatred as he is; however, she kicks him out the next morning when she catches him taking money from her purse.

Trish's middle child, Timmy, is preparing for his bar mitzvah and trying to determine what it means to become a man. Trish has for years told Timmy and Chloe that Bill had died. Timmy is angered to find out that she lied to him. When he asks her about the mechanics of rape, Trish urges him to scream as soon as any man touches him.

Meanwhile, Joy takes a break from Allen, and heads to Florida to spend time with Trish. She begins having visions of Andy, a former co-worker who had died by suicide shortly after dating her. She briefly goes to California to visit Helen, who has become a successful screenwriter, and calls her husband to leave a message that she is coming home. The audience sees that Allen has died by suicide. She returns to Florida to attend Timmy's bar mitzvah.

In the meantime, Bill sneaks into Trish's house to find Billy's college address. He pays Billy an unexpected visit at Northern Oregon University, where they discuss their past and the time that passed while Bill was in prison; in particular, Bill asks Billy a few very blunt questions about his sex life. Bill asks for forgiveness, but Billy refuses, saying his actions are unforgivable. Bill then disappears again, reassured that Billy will not turn out to be like him.

Harvey brings his adult son Mark to dinner at Trish's, where he and Trish introduce their children to each other. At Timmy's request, Harvey comes to Timmy's room to have a talk. Timmy asks Harvey whether he is gay or a pedophile. Harvey denies being either, and, suspecting Timmy has been molested, tries to comfort him, touching his shoulder and hugging him. Terrified, Timmy starts to scream as per his mother's earlier instructions. Trish believes that Harvey tried to molest Timmy, and dumps him.

Timmy has his bar mitzvah, during which Joy experiences visions of Andy and then Allen, who implores her to die by suicide as he has, but Joy refuses and banishes him from her life. Timmy leaves the reception to find Mark, Harvey's son. He begs Mark (who reveals he has dealt with allegations of pedophilia, referencing events from Solondz's 2004 film Palindromes) for forgiveness, as he made his mistakes before his bar mitzvah (an event marking the beginning of moral accountability). Mark grants him forgiveness, but notes that such gestures are meaningless. Timmy then says that all he wants is his father.

== Cast ==
- Shirley Henderson as Joy Jordan
- Ciarán Hinds as Bill Maplewood
- Allison Janney as Trish Jordan Maplewood
- Michael Lerner as Harvey Wiener
- Chris Marquette as Billy Maplewood
- Rich Pecci as Mark Wiener
- Charlotte Rampling as Jacqueline
- Paul Reubens as Andy
- Ally Sheedy as Helen Jordan
- Dylan Riley Snyder as Timmy Maplewood
- Renée Taylor as Mona Jordan
- Michael K. Williams as Allen Mellencamp
- Gaby Hoffmann as Wanda

== Critical reception ==
Life During Wartime received generally favorable reviews. On review aggregator website Rotten Tomatoes, the film holds an approval rating of 68% based on 105 reviews, and an average rating of 6.40/10. The website's critics consensus reads: "With Life During Wartime, Todd Solondz delivers an unexpected semi-sequel to Happiness in typically uncompromising fashion." On Metacritic, the film has a weighted average score of 69 out of 100, based on 30 critics, indicating "generally favorable" reviews.

== Soundtrack ==
The title song was performed by Devendra Banhart. The song was written by Solondz, with music by Marc Shaiman; it was produced by Beck and Banhart, with background vocals by Beck.

== Home media ==
The film was released on DVD and Blu-ray by The Criterion Collection in July 2011.
