= Jordan Gelber =

American actor and singer (born 1975)

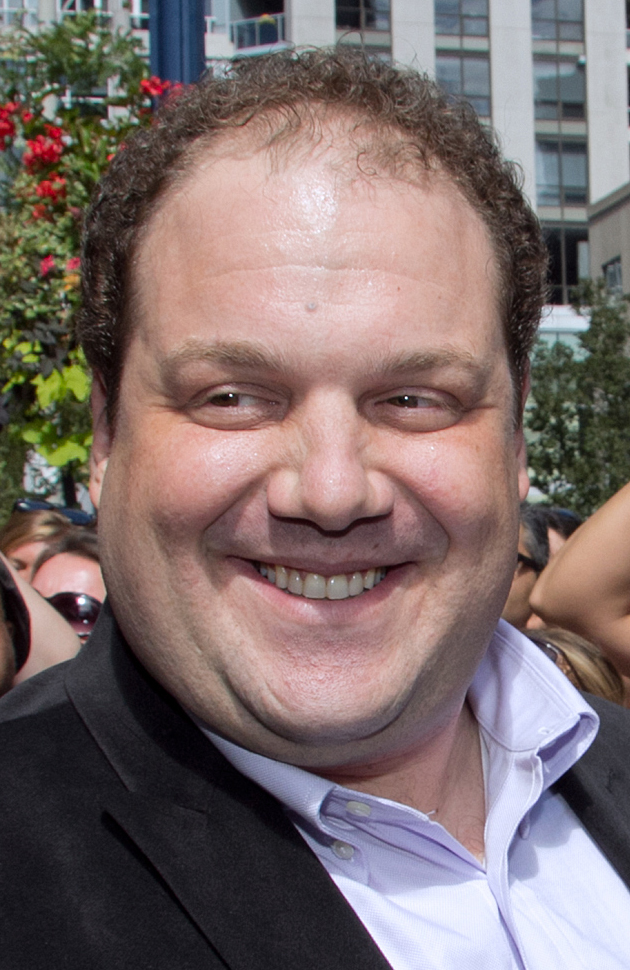
- Gelber at the 2011 Toronto International Film Festival
- Born: 1975 (age 50–51); Riverdale, Bronx, New York, U.S.
- Education: Stanford University (BA); New York University (MFA)
- Occupations: Actor, singer
- Years active: 2001–present
- Spouse: Marsha Loeb (m. 2009)
- Children: 2

Jordan Gelber (born 1975) is an American actor and singer. He has performed on Broadway in the musical Avenue Q, in All My Sons and in Elf the Musical, among other shows. He has also performed in many off-Broadway productions. He has a recurring role in the CBS TV show Elementary and in other television shows.

== Early life and education ==
Gelber is the son of Donald and Barbra Gelber. He was born in the Riverdale neighborhood of the Bronx, New York City, and grew up in Woodmere, Long Island. Gelber has a younger sister, Marielle. Gelber is Jewish. In 1993, he graduated from George W. Hewlett High School in Hewlett, Long Island.

He attended the National Theater Institute.

He is a 1997 graduate of Stanford University, where he was a member of the Stanford Improvisors improvisational theatre troupe and an a cappella group, Stanford Mendicants.

In 2000, Gelber earned a master's degree in acting from New York University's Graduate Acting Program at the Tisch School of the Arts.

== Career ==
=== Broadway ===
He is known for originating the role of struggling comedian Brian in the Tony Award-winning Broadway musical Avenue Q. Gelber also performed on Broadway in Arthur Miller's All My Sons as Frank Lubey from 2008 to 2009, and played Buddy in Elf the Musical from 2012 to 2013. In 2017, at the Hudson Theatre, Gelber played Louis/Billy in the limited-run Broadway revival of the Stephen Sondheim/James Lapine musical Sunday in the Park With George starring Jake Gyllenhaal and Annaleigh Ashford.

=== Additional Stage Performances ===
He has also been in two off-Broadway productions by the Exchange Theater, Realism and Jump!.

His other off-Broadway credits include The Polish Play with the Katharsis Theater Company and Birth and After Birth at the Atlantic Theater Company. In 2019, he played Nathan Detroit in The Muny's production of Guys and Dolls.

A particular performance he is less recognized for was in Elvis People at New World Stages.

=== Television and film ===
Gelber has a recurring role in the CBS TV show Elementary as the medical examiner Dr. Eugene Hawes. He also appeared on the first three episodes of the HBO series Boardwalk Empire. His television work also includes a recurring role as CSU Tech Layton on Law & Order: Special Victims Unit and appearances in episodes of Law & Order: Criminal Intent, The Sopranos and Mr. Robot.

His film credits include a role in Riding in Cars with Boys opposite Sara Gilbert, the 2007 crime drama Before the Devil Knows You're Dead and The Taking of Pelham 123 in 2009. In late 2010, he starred in the Todd Solondz film Dark Horse. In 2016, he played a supporting role in the boxing drama film Bleed for This.

He lent his voice to the video game The Warriors as Chatterbox, leader of the Hi-Hats gang.

== Personal life ==
In November 2009, Gelber married Marsha Loeb, a senior online medical editor at McGraw-Hill. They have two sons, Henry and Dashiell.

== Filmography ==
=== Film ===
Year	Title	Role	Notes
2001	Way Off Broadway	Ethan	
2001	Riding in Cars with Boys	Kevin	
2002	Changing Lanes	Priest	
2004	Everyday People	Ira	
2007	Before the Devil Knows You're Dead	Agent #2	
2008	Pretty Bird	Corporate Hotshot #2	
2009	The Taking of Pelham 123	Commuter	
2010	Henry's Crime	Trofimov	
2011	Dark Horse	Abe	
2015	Condemned	Big Foot	
2016	Bleed for This	Dan Duva	
2019	The Kitchen	Chaim	

=== Television ===
Year	Title	Role	Notes
2002–2003	Law & Order: Special Victims Unit	CSU Technician David Layton	8 episodes
2008	Ugly Betty	Uno	Episode: "The Manhattan Project"
2013–2019	Elementary	Dr. Eugene Hawes	25 episodes
2019	Last Week Tonight with John Oliver	Hotdog Vendor	Episode: "SLAPP Suits"
2025	Your Friends & Neighbors	Paul Levitt	7 episodes

2007 the good wife

=== Theater ===
Year	Title	Role	Notes
Unknown	Marty the Musical (Workshop)	Marty	
Unknown	Dirty Dancing: the Musical (Workshop)	Unknown	
2003-2007	Avenue Q	Brian	Broadway
2008-2009	All My Sons	Frank Lubey	Broadway
2012-2013	Elf	Buddy the Elf	Broadway
2016	Sunday in the Park with George	Louis/Billy	Off-Broadway
2017	Sunday in the Park with George	Louis/Billy	Broadway
2017	A Funny Thing Happened on the Way to the Forum	Pseudolus	The Muny
2019	Guys and Dolls	Nathan Detroit	The Muny
2020	Mack & Mabel	Kessel	Encores!
2022	Mr. Saturday Night	Joey/Farber/Dr. Jeff/Elderly Actor/Others	Broadway
2023-2024	Fiddler on the Roof	Tevye	Paper Mill Playhouse

=== Videogames ===
Year	Title	Role
2002	Midnight Club II	Moses
2005	The Warriors	Chatterbox
