= Dark Horse (2011 film) =

- Directed by: Todd Solondz
- Written by: Todd Solondz
- Produced by: Ted Hope; Derrick Tseng
- Starring: Justin Bartha; Selma Blair; Mia Farrow; Jordan Gelber; Donna Murphy; Christopher Walken; Zachary Booth; Aasif Mandvi
- Cinematography: Andrij Parekh
- Edited by: Kevin Messman
- Production companies: Goldcrest Films; Vitagraph Films; Mount Pleasant Pictures
- Distributed by: Brainstorm Media
- Release dates: September 5, 2011 (Venice); June 8, 2012 (United States)
- Running time: 84 minutes
- Country: United States
- Language: English
- Box office: $255,025

Dark Horse is a 2011 American comedy-drama film written and directed by Todd Solondz. It stars Justin Bartha, Selma Blair, Mia Farrow, Jordan Gelber, Donna Murphy, Christopher Walken, Zachary Booth and Aasif Mandvi.

The film had its world premiere at the Venice Film Festival on September 5, 2011, and was released on June 8, 2012, by Brainstorm Media.

== Plot ==
Abe (Jordan Gelber), a man in his thirties who lives at home with his parents, meets suicidal Miranda (Selma Blair) who recently moved back home after a failed literary/academic career and a divorce. While waiting outside Miranda's house for their first date, Marie (his secretary) runs up and tells him to give up on pursuing the girl as he has no shot, but then he wakes with a start revealing it was a dream.

At several points in the film Marie (his secretary who says she had twin children who would have been Abe's age but died) turns up in unexpected places and talks with him, often to discourage him from pursuing a relationship with Miranda or to take him away. The places include the parking lot outside the bar where he has just hit Mahmoud, his bedroom where he looks up hepatitis and on a street corner after an argument he had with his mother and brother in his car.

While Miranda has forgotten about their date, Abe gives a speech about how he is a dark horse and proposes marriage. She refuses but a few days later, out of desperation and after having talked to her ex, Mahmoud, she changes her mind, saying that she does want to marry Abe. During the course of events, Miranda says she has hepatitis B, and may have already put Abe at risk of catching it since they had kissed and shared a toothbrush. He meets Miranda and Mahmoud (who is on friendly terms with her) at a bar and soon suspects that Mahmoud is the one who gave Miranda hepatitis. He beats up Mahmoud, breaking his jaw. Abe thinks he has driven away Miranda by this but she calls him and continues the relationship. Abe is fired by his father and is to be replaced by his cousin Justin. His mother tells him she knew about it and that they had long ago decided Abe was a failure.

He runs through the rain to the same toy store where, at the start of the film, he had previously tried to return a damaged toy but had been told that he could not because the toy is open and the manager is out to lunch. This time Abe tells the clerk he is looking for his fiancee who is in the store somewhere. He pulls out his waterlogged receipt to prove that he has purchased a fiancee there and he just wants to pick her up but he gets the same response from the clerk. The store manager turns up and turns out to be Mahmoud with a severe jaw injury and neck brace. Mahmoud gives a speech about how "he knows Abe is a loser" and "Miranda never really cared and would have been better off with his brother". The speech develops into a metaphor about life and how everyone has a receipt that is abruptly cut off mid-sentence.

The scene cuts to a shot of Abe in hospital surrounded by his family. He wakes up and they report that he has been in a coma for two months after being hit by a car in the office parking lot. Miranda is there and tells him that she did not know him and was never attracted to him but then adds that she cares. She does not specify about what she cares and refuses to answer his questions about what. She leaves, saying that she is not pregnant despite Abe's mother's belief, and Abe flatlines. He recovers only to develop hepatitis and jaundice. He talks with Marie, forcefully kisses her (thereby contaminating her) and flatlines again.

Looking well, he walks into his parents' house where he has lived his whole life. It is empty of people. He tears off a small section of wallpaper to reveal his childhood height recorded on the wall by his father with the label Abe, Dad's "Dark Horse".

At the uncovering of his headstone his family is gathered with Marie and a young workmate, who may be her boy-toy, as well as Miranda who is holding a young baby and who has Richard's arm around her. Richard points out the inscribed death date is wrong but his father says not to tell Richard's mother.

Marie slow-dances with Abe by candlelight to a saxophone version of "When I Fall in Love" and the scene abruptly cuts to a shot of Marie sitting at work with a faraway, daydream look on her face casting into doubt the source of the story.

== Cast ==
- Jordan Gelber as Abe
- Selma Blair as Miranda
- Christopher Walken as Jackie
- Mia Farrow as Phyllis
- Justin Bartha as Richard
- Aasif Mandvi as Mahmoud
- Donna Murphy as Marie
- Mary Joy as Lori
- Peter McRobbie as Arnie
- Zachary Booth as Justin
- Tyler Maynard as Jiminy
- Lee Wilkof as Phil
- Jason Alexander as George Costanza (voiceover)
- Jerry Stiller as Frank Costanza (voiceover)
- Estelle Harris as Estelle Costanza (voiceover)

== Production ==
In an August 2010 interview, Solondz reported that he had finished the script for the project, but had been reluctant to share any details in press reports. Shooting began in New York City in October 2010.

Solondz, who could not afford to license an episode of Seinfeld for the film, decided to instead write lines for Jason Alexander, Jerry Stiller, and Estelle Harris, and added a laugh track.

== Release ==
The film was shown at the 68th Venice International Film Festival in September 2011, as well as the 2011 Toronto International Film Festival the same month. Shortly after, Brainstorm Media acquired distribution rights to the film. The film was released in a limited release on June 8, 2012.

== Critical reception ==
Dark Horse received positive reviews. Review aggregator website Rotten Tomatoes reports that based on 80 reviews, 73% of critics gave the film a positive review, with an average rating of 6.2/10. The website's critics consensus reads, "Typically misanthropic yet curiously satisfying and incisive, Dark Horse is a movie that preaches to the cynical converted." On Metacritic, the film holds a weighted average score of 66 out of 100 based on 29 reviews, indicating "generally favorable" reviews. Later, Time film critic Richard Corliss placed the film in his list of "Top 10 Movies of 2012".
