= Arsi Nami =

Swedish-Iranian singer (born 1984)

- Also known as: Arsi Nami
- Born: Arsalan Nami; May 21, 1984 (age 42); Shiraz
- Genres: Pop, Eurodance, World, Electronic
- Occupation: Actor
- Instruments: Vocals, guitar, piano, percussion
- Website: www.arsinami.com

Arsalan Nami (Persian: ارسلان نامی; born May 21, 1984) better known as Arsi Nami, is a Swedish-Persian actor molded in Santa Monica, living in Manhattan, New York City. He earned himself 14 international Best Actor awards in 2022/23 for his role of Dylan Steere in Aion, a film presented and sponsored by Fujifilm. The awards was given by the New York City International Film Awards, Tokyo Film Awards, Chicago Indie Film Awards, Sweden Film Awards, Cannes Silk Road Film Awards, Brazil Visions Film Fest, San Diego Movie Awards and Best Istanbul Film Festival to name a few. Thanks to his remarkable performance in Aion, the film was also selected and screened at the Academy of Motion Picture Arts and Sciences (Oscars host) in Hollywood, California

Arsi Nami also co-stars in a Farsi/Dari speaking role on Season 2 of FX TV Series The Old Man starring Academy Award winning actor Jeff Bridges and Academy Award nominated actor John Lithgow.

He is also cast as Real-Life Mobster Thomas DeSimone in Season 3 in Stories of the American Mafia streaming October 5, 2026 on Fox Nation, Apple TV and Amazon Prime Video.

Arsi Nami was also the lead actor in two Telly Award winning Commercials in 2023, Vaporesso: Through the Darkness and Eveready Battery / Energizer. He also won the Jury Prize award at the 2017 Entr'2 Marches International Film Festival in Cannes for his leading role in the motion picture Love is Blind, portraying the visually-impaired Italian American Giovanni. Love is Blind also won an award for disability awareness and was screened at world famous Palais des Festivals et des Congrès.

Arsi Nami was also named as a Judge in the panel of the 2018, 2019 and 2020 Cannes Entr'2 Marches International Film Festival He was the lead actor in Children's Hospital Los Angeles production Healthcare in the Cloud, which premiered at the 2018 Society of Camera Operators Lifetime Achievement Awards, raising over $8 million for children's vision health. He portrayed as the manic depressed French-American painter named Vincent, in 2017 European Cinematography Award-winning drama motion picture Camelia.

He also received another international claim via his outstanding and comedic role as Cadiz in the Just Cause 4 award-winning commercials for Square Enix, PlayStation and Xbox, as well as his lead role in the international hit music video "Hurt People" performed by international artists Aloe Blacc and Gryffin which reached over 1 million views on VEVO and YouTube. Arsi Nami has also been a guest-star on the Steve Harvey show on NBCUniversal, as well as The Late Late Show with James Corden on CBS. His commercial acting credits include giant brands such as Amazon, Bloomberg L.P. Google, PlayStation, BMW, Puma, MGM Grand, Mercedes-Benz, Prada, New York Lottery, Facebook,Stanford Medicine ,Hewlett Packard KIA, Ford, Samsung, Disney, NBA and Guitar Center to name a few. He was also nominated for best lead male actor in the comedy film Villa, at 2017 Official Selection at Premio Tortoreto alla Cultura in Italy, AM Film Festival in Egypt and International Festival of Short Films on Culture & Tourism, India.

Arsi Nami's National TV breakthrough started when he was 17 years old, participating on Sikta mot stjärnorna(Aiming at the Stars), a national talent show program televised on TV4 (Sweden). organized by FremantleMedia (American Idol). After two auditions where 4000 participated, he became one of the 45 to enter the show acting and singing "Hero" (by Enrique Iglesias) live on national television, winning the second place award.

He won the Jury Prize for Best Short Screenplay for his screenplay Bachata at the 2021 New York City Movie Awards, 2021. He won the Best Drama Short Screenplay award at 2021 Austin After Dark Film Festival and at the 2021 CFIFF Changing Face International Film Festival in Australia.

His music credits include music written, sang and released on Fox TV shows Bones and The Goodwin Games as well Entr'2 Marches International Film Festival winning film Love is Blind and Crown Prince of Heaven.

According to MTV.com, he is also listed as one of the few multilingual actors, musicians and music therapists outside of Shiraz. He is also known to be the first Persian to introduce Music Therapy to the Persian population, where music is used to help increase quality of life for individuals with psychological and physical deficits. He is also being a philanthropist contributing to the special needs and disability communities through arts, film and music therapy.

== Acting, TV and Commercials ==
Arsi Nami's National TV breakthrough started when he was 17 years old, participating on Sikta Mot Stjärnorna (Aiming at the Stars), a national talent show program televised on TV4 (Sweden). organized by FremantleMedia (American Idol). After two auditions where 4000 participated, he became one of the 45 to enter the show acting and singing "Hero" (by Enrique Iglesias) live on national television, winning the second place award.

His acting career blossomed through a silver lining leading to international awards at Film Festivals in Cannes, Los Angeles and Belgium. His passion for acting grew as he auditioned for the role of a blind man in motion picture Love is Blind, a population which he had been working for since he was 16 years old within healthcare and music therapy. Arsi Nami won the Jury Prize award at the 2017 Entr'2 Marches International Film Festival for his leading role in motion picture Love is Blind, portraying visually-impaired Italian-American Giovanni. Love is Blind also won an award for disability awareness and was screened at Palais des Festival et des Congrès. The film also received an official selection and nominated as the best short film at Hollywood Screening Film Festival and WE Care Film Festival in India, becoming a worldwide success for promoting disability awareness. Arsi Nami did also compose the Official film soundtrack for Love is Blind Arsi Nami was also named as a Judge at the 2018 Entr'2 Marches International Film Festival.

He earned himself the 14 Best Actor awards for his role of Dylan Steere in Aion, a film presented and sponsored by Fujifilm, about a single father whom with his ill son defies the unstoppable power of time through their relationship and love for each other. a film presented and sponsored by Fujifilm. The awards was given by the 2022 New York City International Film Awards, Tokyo Film Awards, Chicago Indie Film Awards, Sweden Film Awards, Cannes Silk Road Film Awards, Brazil Visions Film Fest, San Diego Movie Awards and Best Istanbul Film Festival to name a few. Thanks to his remarkable performance in Aion, the film was also selected and screened at the Academy of Motion Picture Arts and Sciences (Oscars host) in Hollywood, California

Arsi Nami also co-stars in a Farsi/Dari speaking role on Season 2 of FX TV Series The Old Man starring Academy Award winning actor Jeff Bridges and Academy Award nominated actor John Lithgow.

Arsi Nami was also the lead actor in two Telly Award winning Commercials in 2023, Through the Darkness and Eveready.

Arsi Nami helped contribute to the disability community through film as he also starred as the lead actor in Children's Hospital Los Angeles production Healthcare in the Cloud, which raised over $8 million for children's vision health and pr. Healthcare in the Cloud premiered at 2018 Society of Camera Operators Lifetime Achievement Awards. With Arsi Nami's experience of working with population with mental health disorders, he took on the leading role of manic depressed French-American painter, Vincent, in motion picture Camelia, that won the 2017 European Cinematography Award.

He also received another international claim via his outstanding and comedic role as Cadiz in Just Cause 4 commercials for Square Enix PlayStation and Xbox, as well as his lead role in the international hit music video "Hurt People" performed by international artists Aloe Blacc and Gryffin which reached over 1 million views on VEVO and YouTube.

He portrayed as Randy Rigatoni, a Guinness World Record Judge in Oliver Tree's attempt to ride the biggest scooter in the world, with the video becoming top 6 trending videos on YouTube with over 1.2 million views within a day.

Arsi Nami has also been a guest-star on the Steve Harvey show on NBCUniversal, as well as The Late Late Show with James Corden on CBS.

He was also the lead actor in comedy film Villa, a 2017 Official Selection at Premio Tortoreto alla Cultura, Italy and International Festival of Short Films on Culture & Tourism, India. Arsi Nami also composed the soundtrack for Love is Blind as well as being the poster and art director. His other outstanding and comedic international role was as Cadiz in Just Cause 4 commercials for Square Enix, PlayStation and Xbox. He also acted as the lead actor in comedy film Villa, an Official Selection in 2017 IFFC International Film Festival in India. Commercials include: Disney, Kia, BMW, TESLA, MGM GRAND, Cadillac, HP, Samsung, NBA, Vivo Phone China, Guitar Center, Independence Day Resurgence, Westin Hotels, Clorox, El Vato, Los Defensores etc.

== Awards and nominations ==
Award	Year
Gothamite Film Festival, New York City – Winner – Best Actor – Aion – (Lead Actor)	2024
Telly Awards - Winner: Silver – VAPORESSO: Through The Darkness – Best Online Commercial – (Lead Actor)	2023
Telly Awards - Winner: Bronze – Eveready - Best Campaign – (Lead Actor)	2023
Chicago Indie Film Festival - Winner – Best Actor – Aion – (Lead Actor)	2022
New York International Film Awards – Winner – Best Actor – Aion – (Lead Actor)	2022
Sweden International Film Festival - Winner – Best Actor – Aion – (Lead Actor)	2022
Rome International Film Awards - Winner – Best Actor – Aion – (Lead Actor)	2022
Best Istanbul Film Festival – Winner – Best Actor – Aion – (Lead Actor)	2022
San Diego Movie Awards - Winner – Best Actor – Aion – (Lead Actor)	2022
Cannes Silk Road Film Awards – Winner – Best Actor – Aion – (Lead Actor)	2022
Tokyo Film Awards – Winner – Best Actor – Aion – (Lead Actor)	2022
Brazil Visions Film Fest – Winner – Best Actor – Aion – (Lead Actor)	2022
Luleå International Film Awards – Best Actor – Aion – (Lead Actor)	2022
Sweden Film Awards – Best Actor – Aion – (Lead Actor)	2022
New York City Movie Awards – Jury Prize Winner – Best Short Screenplay – Bachata – (Writer)	2021
CFIFF Changing Face International Film Festival, Australia – Jury Prize Winner Best Short Screenplay – Bachata – (Writer)	2021
Austin After Dark Film Festival Best Drama Short Screenplay Winner – Bachata – (Writer)	2021
Cannes Entr'2 Marches International Film Festival – Jury Prize Winner – Love is Blind – (Lead Actor/Composer/Art Director)	2017
Los Angeles Clio Award Winner – Just Cause 4 commercial / Cadiz – (Lead Actor)	2019
Los Angeles Promax Games Awards Nominee – Just Cause 4 commercial / Cadiz – (Lead Actor)	2019
Los Angeles ThinkLA Idea Awards – Award Finalist and Nominee- Just Cause 4 commercial / Cadiz – (Lead Actor)	2019
Orlando International Film Festival – Official Selection – Stop Dreaming of Me – (Lead Actor/Poster artist)	2018
Austin Spotlight Film Festival – Best Film Nomination – Stop Dreaming of Me – (Lead Actor/Poster artist)	2018
European Cinematography Awards – Winner Best Film – Camelia – (Lead Actor/Poster artist)	2017
We Care Film International Film Festival – New Delhi, India – Best Film Nomination – Love is Blind – (Lead Actor/Composer/Art Director)	2017
IFFC- International Festival of Short films on Culture & Tourism, India – Best Film Nomination – Villa – (Lead Actor/Art Director)	2017
Hollywood Screenings Film Festival – Best Film Nomination – Love is Blind – (Lead Actor/Composer/Art Director)	2017
International Film Festival Premio Tortoreto alla Cultura, Italy – Best Film Nomination – Villa – (Lead Actor/Art Director)	2017
AM International Film Festival Egypt – Best Lead Actor Male Nomination – Villa – (Lead Actor/Art Director)	2017
James R. Simpson Merit Scholarship Award for Music Therapy studies (Awarded by President Dianne Harrison at California State University of Northridge)	2014
Royal Swedish Music Academy Scholarship Award (Kungliga Musikaliska Akademien)	2013
Bayramian Art Scholarship Award	2013
Music For Your Heart Foundation – Certification Appreciation Award	2012
Nominated as UGT Talent Award Show best lead singer	2010
Pearl M Follmer Memorial Music Scholarship Award	2010
William T L Gertrude V. Powell Memorial Music Scholarship Award	2009
Iranian.com Iranian of the day Award	2008
Simon Trust Music Scholarship Award	2008
Esther Landon Memorial Music Scholarship Award	2007
Aiming at Stars 2nd place Award (National Television Competition Sweden)	2003

== Music ==
Arsi Nami's music has been featured on several TV Shows, films and video games.

His song "She Wants to Fly" (feat. Levi Whalen) was featured on Fox TV show Bones on May 12, 2014. The song was originally written for Freedom in Iran during the 2009 Presidential Elections and has previously been featured on the soundtrack of Cannes Film Festival movie Crown Prince of Heaven in 2010. It has also been broadcast on major TV networks around the world such as Peace Day Television show which has featured world figures Dalai Lama, Bono, U2, Brad Pitt, George Clooney, Angelina Jolie etc.

His dance-pop song "Never Be Lonely" (feat. Levi Whalen) was on June 3, 2013, featured on Fox TV show The Goodwin Games. "Never Be Lonely" is also featured as the dance track for the web video game Good Game Disco made by Goodgame Studios.

He also composed the Official Film Soundtrack for Love Is Blind, which won the Jury Prize at 2017 Entr'2 Marches International Film Festival, as well as being the Official Selection for the 2017 WE Care Film Festival, India and nominated as Best Short in 2017 Hollywood Screening Festival.

His song "Paradise" (feat. Levi Whalen) was on May 1, 2015, voted as No. 1 song at top 100 Indie Dance/Disco chart on Spinnin' Records Talent Pool. The song was also voted as number 1 song at March top 10 House dance chart on House Charts.com His pop music with his cultural musical blend of Eurodance, World Rhythms and Electronica. Arsi Nami is also known for writing and performing his works for Freedom, Human Rights and Health foundations with all music & lyrics written by him. His music is multilingual, which includes songs released in English, Spanish, Italian and Swedish.

Arsi Nami joins Andrea Bocelli, The Beatles and Elvis Presley for releasing Consuelo Velázquez famous song "Bésame Mucho", via Shiraz Records, which makes it the first Duo/Latin house version in history, produced by Levi Whalen and co-sung with singer Jacqueline Padilla.

On April 21, 2013, Arsi Nami became the first artist to release his Pop Electronic and Progressive House rendition of world-famous Italian song "Caro Mio Ben" featuring UK based producer Kryphon. "Caro Mio Ben" was written by Italian composer Giuseppe Giordani, and made famous by Luciano Pavarotti. He is the executive producer of Caro Mio Ben music video which had world premiere on MTV.com on August 9, 2013. He has also co-directed, produced, and edited two of his music videos "100 Miles" and "Heaven Knows", which have been broadcast through mainstream medium giants such as MTV UK and featured at the Laemmie Theaters Santa Monica SMC Film Festival.

On January 14, 2012, Arsi Nami was signed by music publishing company Winogradsky/Sobel to have his music pitched for television, film and video games etc. becoming the first artist in the company representing Pop/Euro-Dance and World Music genre

Arsi Nami's single "Miracle" (feat Si Ana) released February 2012 via Royalty Recordings was featured for ten weeks on world's largest dance music store Beatport as Top Staff Pick in the pop/rock category. Arsi Nami's music is also listed on FairShareMusic, with profits going to human rights and health support organizations such as Red Cross, War Child, Nordoff-Robbins Music Therapy, Amnesty International, Cancer Care & Research etc.

== Music therapy ==
According to MTV.com, Arsi Nami is also known for being the first Iranian to introduce music therapy to the Iranian population, where music is used to help increase quality of life for individuals with psychological and physical deficits. That includes his several TV appearances on giant Iranian media television stations such as IRAN TV, Radio 670am KIRN Los Angeles with journalist, author Homa Sarshar, Mardoom TV and TinTV and invitations to speak at UCLA. He has been awarded several scholarships and awards for his music therapy practice and accomplishments. His recent awards include:The 2014 James R Simpson Merit Scholarship awarded by President Dianne Harrison of California State University, Northridge, The Royal Swedish Music Academy Award in 2013 and the Bayramian Art Scholarship Award in 2012 and 2013, for his music therapy studies and accomplishments. Arsi Nami does also spend his time making motivational and guest speaking appearances. Speeches include Music Therapy, the positive influence of music on children and his music and cultural journey from Iran to Sweden to Los Angeles. His speeches also include leading instrumental music improvisation and therapeutic music instrumentation with the audience. Invitations include Stand Up to Cancer at UCLA, Music Entrepreneurship classes at California State University, Northridge, Music For Your Heart Foundation in Miami, Children's Boosh Foundation in Los Angeles, International Children Foundation in Santa Barbara, Cottage Health System in Santa Barbara and California State University, Channel Islands.

Arsi Nami is also the author of "The Effects of Music Therapy on Movement and Vocalization in Adult Male with Intellectual Disability and Cerebral Palsy: A Case Study and Treatment Plan", a clinical case study on how music therapy interventions on individuals with disabilities is so effective that it can help increase their speech and improve physical skills, which in turn can assist individuals with disabilities to communicate within their community more clearly and making their inclusion easier. He emphasizes on how vocalization aids in the development of functional communication skills, helping individuals with Intellectual Disabilities communicate their specific needs, wants, and discomforts within the community, which will help increase their personal independence and quality of life.

== Guest appearances and performances ==
Topic	Audience	Event/Location
Arsi Nami guest appearance at the 2022 Austin After Dark Film Festival, receiving the award for Best Drama Short Screenplay for his screenplay Bachata (October 26, 2021)	Film Festival	Austin
Arsi Nami guest appearance on the Late Late Show with James Corden on CBS, as a live Tinder (app). (January 21, 2020)	National TV	Los Angeles
Arsi Nami guest-star on the Steve Harvey Show "Steve" on NBCUniversal, sharing dating advise and talking about relationship goals.(April 8, 2019)	National TV	Los Angeles
Arsi Nami portrays as Freddie Mercury at 2018 Kaaboo Del Mar Music Festival in San Francisco promoting upcoming movie Bohemian Rhapsody. In theaters Nov 2nd 2018. (Sept 15, 2018)	National TV	San Diego
Arsi Nami portrays as Freddie Mercury at 2018 Outside Lands Music & Arts Festival in San Francisco, promoting upcoming movie Bohemian Rhapsody. In theaters Nov 2nd 2018. (Aug 10, 2018)	Public event	San Francisco
Guest appearance at 2018 SOC Lifetime Achievement Awards held at Loews Hotel, in Hollywood, California. An event where Arsi Nami portrayed as the father of co-star Talia Ibrahim, in Children's Hospital Los Angeles production "Healthcare in the Cloud". A production that has raised over $8 million for children's vision health (Feb 3, 2018)	Special invited guests	Los Angeles
Guest on GEM TV hosted by Zahra Sourosh and Dr.Foojan Zeine, talking about Music Therapy, how Arsi Nami overcame darkness and pain through acting therapy, acting as a lead character in motion picture Love is Blind, which he composed the soundtrack for which Won the Jury Prize at Cannes International Film Festival Entr'2 Marches, GEM TV (June 2, 2017)	International TV	Los Angeles
Guest on Breakfast with Homa Sarshar, Radio 670am (April 8, 2017)	International listeners	Los Angeles
Featured Model, 4th Annual Vintage Glamour Bridal Event at Rancho Las Lomas (January 31, 2016)	Public event	Orange County, California
Featured Model, 2016 Premiere Bridal Fashion Show at Hilton Worldwide (January 10, 2016)	Public event	Pasadena, California
Guest speaker, lecturing nursing and communication students about Music Therapy, journey from Shiraz to Sweden and Los Angeles & leading a music therapy session (April 16, 2015)	Nursing & Communication Students	California State University, Channel Islands
Guest speaker, lecturing nursing communication and psychology students about Music Therapy, journey from Shiraz to Sweden and Los Angeles & leading therapeutic music session (October 16, 2014)	Nursing & Psychology students	California State University, Channel Islands
Guest speaker, presenting an evidence based Music Therapy method on the effects of Increasing vocalization and improving motor skills on individuals with Intellectual disabilities and Cerebral Palsy. (October 9, 2014)	College students	California State University, Northridge
Guest speaker, lecturing nursing and psychology students about Music Therapy, journey from Shiraz to Sweden and Los Angeles & leading instrumental music improvisation session (April 17, 2014)	Nursing & Psychology students	California State University, Channel Islands
Guest artist at Tin TV's Persian Norooz Show hosted by Dr.Foojan Zeine, talking about Music Therapy, showing his Italian Music Video "Caro Mio Ben" and singing live in Farsi (March 20, 2014)	International TV	Tin TV/AFN, (Tasvir e Iran) Los Angeles
Performed his World Music flavored song "Luna" featuring The Circle at 2014 Music Therapy Showcase (Feb.25, 2014)	Public event	Cypress Hall, Northridge, Los Angeles
Singing as a Tenor for the Irish band The Chieftains at a sold-out concert at Valley Performance Arts Center (Feb.22, 2014)	Public event	Valley Performance Arts Center, Northridge, Los Angeles
Lecturing about Music Therapy, talking about his journey from Shiraz to Sweden to Los Angeles and leading an instrumental music improvisation session (Feb. 13, 2014)	Nursing students	Cottage Health System, (CSU Channel Islands), Santa Barbara
Guest artist at Iran TV's Banooye Sharghi Show with Mahroo, talking about music, music therapy and cultural journey from Shiraz to Sweden to Los Angeles (June 19, 2013)	International TV	IRAN TV/ITN Los Angeles
Guest speaker, lecturing Nursing students about Music Therapy, Music Journey from Shiraz to Sweden to Los Angeles & leading music improvisation session (April 18)	Nursing & Psychology students	California State University, Channel Islands
Guest artist at Tin TV's Eternal Voice Show (Nedaye Daroon) talking about music, music therapy, music journey from Shiraz to Sweden to Los Angeles (March 29, 2013)	International TV	Tin TV/AFN, (Tasvir e Iran) Los Angeles
Guest artist at Tin TV's Persian Norooz Show (March 20)	International TV	Tin TV/AFN, (Tasvir e Iran), Los Angeles
Lecturing about Music Therapy & leading music improvisation session with Valentine's Day as topic (Feb.14,2013)	Nursing students	Cottage Health System, (CSU Channel Islands) Santa Barbara
Guest artist on Iranican Show on Radio Javan talking about Music, Music Therapy and singing live	Radio	Radio Javan, Washington, D.C.
Talking about Music Journeys, how music influence children and Music Therapy	Public event	Music For Your Heart Foundation, Miami
Miracles & Music Journeys, Music Therapy and leading a Music Improvisation session	Freshmen students	Professor Dolas Entrepreneurship class California State University, Northridge
Guest artist on MasAppeal Show on Radio Javanan talking about Music, Music Therapy and Life journeys	Radio	Javanan, (Radio Javanan) Los Angeles
Music, Life, Miracles and Inspirations and leading a Music Improvisation session	Music students	Dr.Roscetti entrepreneurship class California State University, Northridge
Guest artist, singing, talking about Music Therapy and Positive motivations	Public event	Stand Up 2 Cancer, UCLA
Guest artist, singing Besame Mucho and honoring Mexican songwriter Consuelo Velázquez	Public event	Dia de Los Muertos Mexican Festival 2011, Los Angeles
Live Singing Performance with dancers Gloria Villegas and Nelson Aparicio	Public event	Malibu Music Awards, Malibu, California
Guest artist at Mardom TV's talking about Music, Music Therapy, Shiraz and upcoming performance on Malibu Music Awards 2011	International TV	Mardom TV with Sorbi, Washington, D.C.
Guest artist, live singing performance dedicated for Freedom and Arts with dancer Gloria Villegas and singer Jacqueline Padilla	Public event	Save The Culture – Hand in Hand with Persian Stars Los Angeles
Singing as a Tenor for Gary Schyman's Orchestra for his world known music written for games Bioshock and Dante's Inferno	Public event	Studio Ensemble Concert California State University, Northridge
Guest artist at Iranian Radio KIRN 670AM, talking about his music and performing songs Never Be Lonely / She Wants To Fly Live on Air	Public event	Radio Iran 670 KIRN, Los Angeles
Singing as a Tenor at the Opening Gala of Valley Performance Arts Center. Song; Brand New Day (Wiz of Oz). Selected by Dean of Mike Curb College of Arts, Media and Communication; Robert Bucker	Public event	Opening Gala of Valley Performance Arts Center 2011, Los Angeles
Live singing and dancing rumba, paso-doble, waltz and tango at consecutive sold-out event[21]	Public event	Folklorico World Dance Performance at The Broad Stage, Santa Monica, California
Guest artist singing live for Cancer foundation	Public event	The benefit Cancer Foundation Fashion Show at Taglyan Palace Hollywood, Hollywood, California
Guest artist, live singing performance benefiting Children Cancer Foundation	Public event	International Fashion Show benefiting International Children Foundation, Santa Barbara, California
Guest artist Christmas singing Live benefiting children foundation	Public event	Stars Shine Bright X-Mas MBar performance benefiting Children's Boosh Foundation. Hollywood, California
Guest artist, performing with his band four consecutive years, biggest Swedish music Festival	Public event	Kalajs Rix Fm Music Festival Jönköping, Sweden

== Music releases ==
Song	Year	Label
Love Is Blind – Original Soundtrack	Oct 14, 2016	[Shiraz Records]
"Paradise" feat. Levi Whalen	Feb 14, 2015	[Shiraz Records]
"Luna" (Instrumental Piano/World Rhythms)	June 4, 2014	[Shiraz Records]
"Threw My Heart Away" feat. Taylor Lipari	Nov 11, 2013	[Shiraz Records]
"Caro Mio Ben" feat. Kryphon	April 27, 2013	[Shiraz Records]
"Besame Mucho" feat Levi Whalen & Jacqueline Padilla	Jan 15, 2013	[Shiraz Records]
"Heaven Knows" Remastered	Jan 1, 2013	[Shiraz Records]
"Dig Jag Vill Ha" (You I Want)	Dec 24, 2012	[Shiraz Records]
"Never Be Lonely" feat. Levi Whalen	Oct 16, 2012	[Shiraz Records]
"Miracle" feat Si Ana	Feb 27, 2012	[Royalty Recordings]
"Keep Falling in Love" feat Florence Rezvani	March 9, 2011	[Shiraz Records]
"She Wants to Fly" (Dedicated for freedom in Iran)	Aug 7, 2009	[Shiraz Records/CPOH OST]
"100 Miles"	Jun 11, 2008	[Indp.]

== Featured songs ==
Song	Year	Featured
Arsi Nami – Love Is Blind (OST)	May 21, 2017	Official Film Soundtrack to 2017 Jury Prize winning film at Cannes International Film Festival
Arsi Nami – Paradise (feat.Levi Whalen)	May 1, 2015	No. 1 song at top 100 Indie Dance/Disco chart on Spinnin' Records Talent Pool
Arsi Nami – Paradise (feat.Levi Whalen)	March 1, 2015	No. 1 song at March top 10 House dance chart on House Charts.com
Arsi Nami – She Wants To Fly (feat.Levi Whalen)	May 12, 2014	Featured on Fox TV show Bones (TV series)
Arsi Nami – Never Be Lonely (feat.Levi Whalen)	June 3, 2013	Featured on Fox TV show The Goodwin Games
Arsi Nami – Never Be Lonely (feat.Levi Whalen)	2010–present	Featured as official dance track by 2012 European Game Award winners Goodgame Studios on web game "Goodgame Disco"
Arsi Nami – Miracle (feat.Si Ana)	2012	Featured 10 weeks as Top Staff Pick on World Largest Dance Music Store Beatport along with Kelly Clarkson and Radiohead
Arsi Nami – She Wants To Fly	2010	Featured on Cannes Film Festival film Crown Prince of Heaven

== Education ==
Arsi Nami graduated with honors on May 19, 2014, with a Bachelor of Arts degree in Music Therapy from California State University, Northridge. He graduated with honors, Music A.A from Santa Monica College and a Music and Media Composing degree from ITM Sweden.

== Philanthropy ==
Arsi Nami Co-Founded non-profit Organization Opportunitree to help the community, children, elderly and individuals with disabilities. He spends a lot of time doing humanitarian work, raising awareness for human rights and health support organizations. He has been involved and contributed to charities such as:Red Cross, War Child, Nordoff-Robbins Music Therapy, Amnesty, WWF, British Heart Foundation, Cancer Research UK and ActionAid. He is also active bringing the importance of Music, Music Therapy to the community, children, elderly and individuals with disabilities. Arsi Nami's major contribution was by sharing disability awareness through of Drama film, Love Is Blind. Arsi Nami portrayed the lead blind actor as well as composing the official film soundtrack. The film was awarded the 2017 Jury Prize award at the Entr'2 Marches International Film Festival in Cannes, as well as official selection at WE Care Film Festival, India.

Arsi Nami's song She Wants To Fly was also written for Freedom and Human Rights in Iran, which has been featured at Peaceday TV and Cannes Film Festival motion picture Crown Prince of Heaven. He has also been a guest artist at Charities such as: Children's Boosh Foundation at Taglyan Place, Los Angeles, Music for your Heart Foundation in Miami, Stand Up 2 Cancer at UCLA, International Children Foundation in Santa Barbara to name a few.

His music is also listed on FairShareMusic, with profits going to human rights and health support organizations.

== Books ==
Arsi Nami, the author of "The Effects of Music Therapy on Movement and Vocalization in Adult Male with Intellectual Disability and Cerebral Palsy: A Case Study and Treatment Plan", where he shows a clinical case study on how music therapy interventions on individuals with disabilities is so effective that it can help increase their speech and improve physical skills, which in turn can assist individuals with disabilities to communicate within their community more clearly and making their inclusion easier. He emphasizes on how vocalization aids in the development of functional communication skills. It also helps individuals with Intellectual Disabilities communicate their specific needs, wants, and wants, and discomforts within the community. Improving gross motor skills would help individuals to increase their personal independence, not only at the day care center but also in the community. In general, both vocalization and gross motors skill development helps to improve the self-help skills of individuals with disabilities, which in-turn increases quality of life. – Clinical Case Studies [22]

== Basketball ==
As a teenager, Arsi Nami played as a Shooting guard (SG) in the team Brahe Basket in Sweden. He accomplished receiving 2 Most Valuable Player Awards as the best player in Jönköping during the 1995/1996 and 1996/1997 season and 1 Most Valuable Player Award as the best player of Southern Sweden during the Swedish Championship Basketball Competition in 1997/1998 season.
