= Nicole Huff =

Filipino-Canadian actress and singer (born 1998)

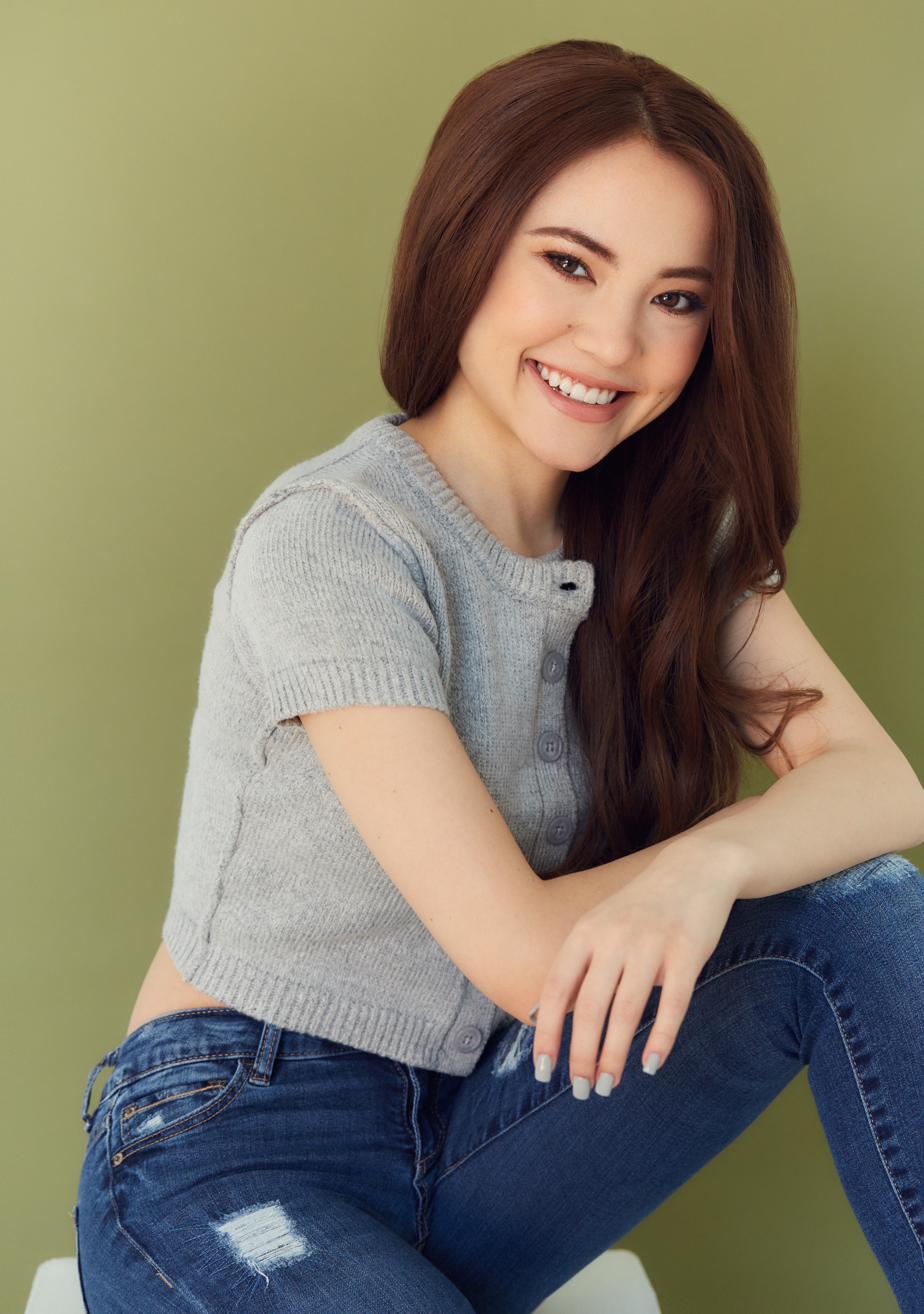
- Born: Nicole Samantha Huff; April 21, 1998 (age 28); Richmond Hill, Ontario, Canada
- Occupations: Actress; singer
- Years active: 2008–present
- Awards: 37th Young Artist Awards
- Musical career
- Genres: Pop; dance; R&B
- Instrument: Vocals
- Website: nicolehuff.com

Nicole Samantha Huff (born April 21, 1998) is a Canadian actress, singer and dancer. She is best known for her role in Degrassi: The Next Generation, Degrassi: Don't Look Back as Gloria, and in Tiny Pretty Things as Paige Aquino. In 2016, Huff was awarded the Young Artist Award for category Best Performance in a TV Movie, Miniseries, Special or Pilot – Young Actress.

== Early life and career ==
Nicole Huff was born and raised in Richmond Hill, Ontario, Canada. Huff attended Cardinal Carter Academy for the Arts high school for the Drama Arts program and Media Production at Ryerson University's RTA Media program, and minored in French Language.

== Career ==
Huff began acting at the age of six, and participated in many commercials and played numerous roles in theatre. In 2015, Huff appeared in Degrassi: The Next Generation, the Canadian teen drama television series as Gloria Chin. The same year, she played the same role in the TV movie, Degrassi: Don't Look Back for which she was awarded the 37th Young Artist Awards and nominated for the Young Entertainers Award. In 2016, She appeared as Scarlett in Knots, a Canadian short film that has been featured in numerous film festivals such as Victoria Film Festival. In 2019, Huff appeared in Diggstown, a Canadian drama TV series where she played Renee Joy.

In 2022, Huff appeared in the mystery thriller film, Luckiest Girl Alive, which stars Mila Kunis and Finn Wittrock and was directed by Mike Barker.

== Filmography ==
Television and film roles
Year	Title	Role	Notes
2008	Life with Derek	Yvette	Season 4 Episode 1
2008 - 2009	The Jon Dore Television Show	Little Girl - Pageant Girl	Rage (2008) - Jon Gets Competitive (2009)
2009	Hotbox	Nicole Huff	Episode 7
2014	Max & Shred	Girl #1	Nose Butter Brain Freeze
2015	Degrassi: The Next Generation	Gloria Chin	Firestarter: Part 1
2015	Degrassi: Don't Look Back	Gloria Chin	(TV Movie)
2015	Knots	Scarlett	
2018	Best Friends Forever (BFF)	Mel	
2019	Diggstown	Renee Joy	Aired March 13, 2019
2019	Private Eyes	Grace	Tex Therapy
2020	Tiny Pretty Things	Paige Aquino	Episode 5-9
2021	The Great Christmas Switch	Cloud / Roommate	(TV Movie)
2022	Luckiest Girl Alive	Olivia Kaplan	

== Discography ==
=== Extended plays ===
Title	Details
Who We Are	Released: August 15, 2025; Format: Digital download

=== Singles ===
Title	Year	Album
(I Got That) Boom Boom (remix)	2025	Non-album single

== Awards and nominations ==
Year	Award	Category	Work	Result	Ref.
2015	Joey Awards	Best Actress – Lead in a Short Film	Knots	Won	
2016	Young Entertainers Award	Best Young Actress 16 to 21 - Short Film	Knots	Nominated	
2016	Young Entertainers Award	Best Supporting Young Actress -TV Movie, Mini Series, or Special	Degrassi: Don't Look Back	Nominated	
2016	Young Artist Award	Best Performance in a TV Movie, Miniseries, Special or Pilot – Young Actress	Degrassi: Don't Look Back	Won	
2019	Joey Awards	Best Actress – Lead in a Short Film	Best Friends Forever	Won	
