= There Is No Competition 3: Death Comes in 3's =

Mixtape by Fabolous
- Released: December 25, 2011
- Recorded: 2011
- Genre: Hip hop
- Length: 49:13
- Label: Desert Storm, Def Jam
- Producer: I.N.F.O., KB, Sonaro, Lil Lody, Drumma Boy, DJ Mustard, Jahlil Beats, GQ Beats, Mally The Martian, Just Blaze, Cardiak

Fabolous chronology
| The S.O.U.L. Tape (2011) | There Is No Competition 3: Death Comes in 3's (2011) | The S.O.U.L. Tape 2 (2012) |

There Is No Competition 3: Death Comes in 3's (TINC3) is the sixth mixtape by American rapper Fabolous. It was released on December 25, 2011. The mixtape features guest appearances from Meek Mill, Trey Songz, Jadakiss, Styles P, Lloyd Banks, Red Cafe, Paul Cain and Broadway.

== Background ==
The cover was released on December 7, 2011. On December 22, 2011, during an interview with XXL Fabolous explained the mixtape will feature him "bullying" again, saying: "I got some original joints on there but, there's also more energy with this one," he says. "I think with the first There Is No Competition, it was more like [me] just rapping and spitting but, this one I wanted a little more energy just because coming off of Soul Tape, that was like my perspective flows, slower beats, and stuff like that so I wanted to give the Ying to the Yang. I wanted to give these niggas some ignorant [shit] but still bars."

Fabolous also explained why TINC3 would be the final chapter in the mixtape series, saying: "I think that's what happens with movies sometimes with the 'Jason Part…' 9s, 10s you [end up] losing a little bit of flavor because you're just recreating the same thing ten times," he shares. "So, I think this one might be the final installment of the There Is No Competition series."

The music video for "She Did It" was released on March 27, 2012. The music video for "Got That Work" was released on April 17, 2012. The music video for "Swag Champ" was released on July 11, 2012. The music video for "Death In The Family" featuring Paul Cain was released on July 23, 2012.

== Critical reception ==
Professional ratings
Review scores
| Source | Rating |
|---|---|
| XXL | (XL) |

Slava Kuperstein at HipHopDX gave the mixtape a negative review, saying "It's not really surprising that There Is No Competition 3 isn't a particularly memorable release. The days of Fabolous' mixtapes being something to write home about has come and gone, but what's troubling is that this is a decidedly lazier release than There Is No Competition 2. Fans can look at it one of two ways: they can opine that either Fab should've left most of this stuff in the recycling bin of his computer, or be thankful for some free material even if it is of dubious quality. Neither of those choices is a ringing endorsement of TINC3's quality, and that should tell you everything you need to know about this project". Neil Martinez-Belkin of XXL gave the mixtape an XL, saying "After a teary eyed introduction from Mr. Thanksgiving, Fab gets down to business, rattling off vicious punch lines over street bangers. "Death Comes in Threes" and "Lord Knows" are the most lyrical affairs, with latter finding Loso putting Ray J and Plaxico Burress in their respective places. "Death in the Family" is the project's most complete effort, a dismissal of rap impostors—"I'm watching these dogs play with my old bones/I feel like niggas found one of my old phones/We in the house, y'all looking to hold loans/And when the market was up, you wouldn't have sold, homes." Guest spots from Meek Mill, Lloyd Banks and a Jadakiss/Styles P back and forth also bolster the tape, as do classic DJ Drama moments like his bellowing out "Happy Dramakah!. There's certainly no questioning Loso's lyrical abilities, but Death Comes in 3's does have a couple of sluggish appearances. Tracks like "Swag Champ" and "Spend it" hold the project back from being as impressive as There is No Competition 2, or his last mixtape, The S.O.U.L. Tape, which showcased the Brooklyn MC in a smoother, more laidback element. Even so, Death Comes in 3's is still a very strong body of work that fans can kick off the new year with. Considering Fab's mixtape resume is second to none, it will always be a hard task to meet the standards he's set for himself. Even harder for the competition".

== Track listing ==
| No. | Title | Producer(s) | Length |
|---|---|---|---|
| 1. | "Intro" | | 1:22 |
| 2. | "Death Comes In 3's" | I.N.F.O. | 2:43 |
| 3. | "You Don't Know Bout It" (featuring Meek Mill) | KB | 3:39 |
| 4. | "Swag Champ" | Sonaro | 3:28 |
| 5. | "The Widows" | | 0:25 |
| 6. | "She Did It" | Lil Lody | 2:59 |
| 7. | "Spend It" (Remix) (featuring Trey Songz) | Drumma Boy | 3:43 |
| 8. | "Black City" (Rack City Remix) | DJ Mustard | 1:53 |
| 9. | "Got That Work" | Jahlil Beats | 2:56 |
| 10. | "B.E.T." (featuring Jadakiss & Styles P) | Sonaro | 2:45 |
| 11. | "Get Down Or Lay Down" (featuring Lloyd Banks) | Jahlil Beats | 3:15 |
| 12. | "Unfuckwitable" (featuring Red Cafe) | GQ Beats | 3:52 |
| 13. | "Death In The Family" (featuring Paul Cain) | Mally The Martian | 4:01 |
| 14. | "Dram's On Time" | | 0:46 |
| 15. | "Lord Knows" (Remix) | Just Blaze | 3:10 |

Hidden track
| No. | Title | Producer(s) | Length |
|---|---|---|---|
| 16. | "Black Bird" (featuring Broadway) | Cardiak | 4:29 |
| Total length: | | | 49:13 |
