= Entr'2 Marches International Film Festival =

French film festival

- Location: Cannes, France
- Founded: May 2010; 15 years ago
- Most recent: 2023
- Artistic director: David Guillon
- No. of films: 19 films in 2023
- Language: International

Entr'2 Marches International Film Festival (French: Festival International du Film Entr'2 Marches, lit. 'Between 2 Steps International Film Festival') is an annual film festival held in Cannes, France during the Cannes Film Festival. It was founded in 2010 and focuses on short films that portray people with disabilities. The festival is organized by the French Association for the Paralyzed (APF).

== Presentation ==
- Sagor Hossain 26-April-1997 lyrics, tuner, singer, video arranger, musical video director, script writer

== History ==
=== 2014 festival ===
Winners

- Grand Prix du Jury : Sunny Boy, Jane Gull (11 min)
- Public Prize (Georges Lautner) : Le problèms c’est que…, Wilfrid Meance(9 min)
- Coup de cœur Price : Nous sommes tous des êtres penchés, Simon Lelouch (26 min)
- Best documentary : La mécanique du silence, Brigitte Lemaine (20 min)
- Best Director : J’en crois pas mes yeux, Henri Poulain (8 min)
- Best Script : Larmes de fond, Philippe Lecoq (20 min)
- Best Actress : Marianne Fabbro in Chichis, glaces, beignets, Marjolaine de Lecluse (14 min)
- Best Actor : Oto Baxter Ups and Downs, Stuart Fryer (9 min)
- Youth Prize : Regarde-moi, Olivier Marchal (13 min)

=== 2017 festival ===
Winners

- Prix du Jury : Love is Blind, Odai Al Mukdad, Arsi Nami, April Lam (5.45 min)
- Prix L'interpretation: Connor Long, as Michael in "Learning to Drive" short film, United States

=== 2019 festival ===
Winners

- Prix Entr'2 Marches : « Miss Hong » de Jong Ki Jeon (Corée - 7 min)
- Prix du Jury : « TEA » de Shokir Kholikov (Ouzbékistan - 15 min)
- Prix de la Réalisation : Javad Daraei pour « Limit » (Iran - 7 min)
- Prix d'Interprétation : Annie Cordy pour « Les Jouvencelles » de Delphine Corrard (France - 20 min)
- Prix du Documentaire : « La Faim des Fous » de Franck Seuret (France - 53 min)
- Prix Très Spécial du Jury : « Te Necesito Ya » de Cremance (Mexique - 53 min)
- Prix du Public Georges Lautner : « Mon Frère ce héros » de Yonatan Nir (Israël - 1h18)
- Prix de la Jeunesse : « Les Jouvencelles » de Delphine Corrard (France - 20 min)
