= Welcome to the Dollhouse =

1995 film by Todd Solondz

- Theatrical release poster
- Directed by: Todd Solondz
- Written by: Todd Solondz
- Produced by: Todd Solondz
- Starring: Heather Matarazzo; Brendan Sexton III; Eric Mabius; Matthew Faber
- Cinematography: Randy Drummond
- Edited by: Alan Oxman
- Music by: Jill Wisoff
- Production company: Suburban Pictures
- Distributed by: Sony Pictures Classics
- Release dates: September 10, 1995 (TIFF); May 24, 1996 (United States)
- Running time: 87 minutes
- Country: United States
- Language: English
- Budget: $800,000
- Box office: $5 million

Welcome to the Dollhouse is a 1995 American coming-of-age black comedy film written, produced, and directed by Todd Solondz. An independent film, it won the Grand Jury Prize at the 1996 Sundance Film Festival and launched the careers of Solondz, Heather Matarazzo and Brendan Sexton III. The story follows the unpopular middle schooler Dawn as she goes to extreme lengths trying to earn the respect of her vicious fellow students and her uninterested family. Dawn reappears in two of Solondz's other films, Palindromes (2004) and Wiener-Dog (2016), but those films have alternate timelines and Dawn meets two different fates in those two films. Dawn's brother and father also appear in the former in addition to Life During Wartime (2009). The film's working title was Faggots and Retards.

== Plot ==
Twelve-year-old Dawn Wiener is a shy and unpopular seventh-grader living in a middle-class suburban community in New Jersey. Her older brother Mark is a nerdy high school student who plays clarinet in a garage band and shuns girls in order to prepare for college. Her younger sister Missy is spoiled and manipulative; she pesters Dawn and dances around the house in a tutu. Her mother Marj is a shrewish woman who dotes on Missy and sides with her in disputes with Dawn. Her father Harv is a meek man who sides with Marj over Dawn. Her only friend is an effeminate sixth-grade boy named Ralphy, with whom she shares a dilapidated clubhouse in her backyard.

At school, Dawn is ridiculed and her locker is covered in graffiti. Her teacher unfairly gives her detention after one of her bullies, Brandon McCarthy, tries to copy her answers on a test. Later, Dawn gets in trouble again after accidentally hitting another teacher in the eye with a spitball in self-defense when Brandon and his friends bully her during an assembly.

Mark's classmate Steve Rodgers, a handsome and charismatic aspiring rock musician, agrees to join the band in exchange for Mark's help in school. Dawn pursues him romantically when they spend time together, though one of Steve's former girlfriends tells her that she has no chance of being with him.

After Dawn calls Brandon a "retard" during a confrontation, he threatens her with rape. His first attempt to assault her after school fails, but shortly afterward, he phones her, ordering her to meet him again the next day. When she complies, he takes her to a junkyard, where he has an earnest conversation with her and kisses her instead. At dinner that evening, when she refuses to tear down her clubhouse to make room for her parents' 20th anniversary party, Marj tells Mark and Missy to destroy it anyway, and gives them Dawn's share of dessert.

Dawn and Brandon spend time in her clubhouse, but she confesses to him her feelings for Steve, causing him to storm out. Ralphy, who was spying on them, tries to comfort Dawn, but she angrily rejects him when he insults Brandon, leaving her with no friends.

At the anniversary party, Dawn intends to proposition Steve, but gets cold feet and is rebuffed. Steve plays with Missy, who pushes Dawn into a kiddie pool. That evening, the family watches a videotape of the party, laughing when Dawn falls into the water. Later, Dawn smashes the tape and briefly brandishes her hammer over Missy as she sleeps.

A few days later, Brandon is arrested and expelled from school for suspected drug dealing. Meanwhile, Harv's car breaks down and Marj has to pick him up. She instructs Dawn to tell Missy to get a ride home with her ballet teacher, but she chooses not to after arguing with Missy, who is subsequently kidnapped.

Dawn visits Brandon's home and meets his intellectually disabled brother and aggressive father. She tells Brandon that she wants to be his girlfriend, but he tells her that he is running away to New York City to avoid being sent to a reformatory. After they kiss, an argument about him dealing drugs ensues, with him saying that one of his friends is the real culprit. Regardless, he asks Dawn if she will come with him, but she declines and he leaves through his bedroom window.

When Marj is informed that Missy's tutu was found in Times Square, Dawn goes to New York City to look for her. After a night of searching, she phones home and Mark tells her that Missy was found alive and unharmed by police after being abducted by a pedophilic neighbor. Dawn returns to town and her classmates ridicule her as she delivers a thank-you speech. Mark later tells her that she cannot expect school life to get any better until high school. On a bus ride to Walt Disney World for a concert tour, Dawn sits among her fellow choir members and unenthusiastically joins them in singing the school anthem.

== Cast ==
- Heather Matarazzo as Dawn Wiener
- Matthew Faber as Mark Wiener
- Daria Kalinina as Missy Wiener
- Angela Pietropinto as Marj Wiener
- Bill Buell as Harv Wiener
- Brendan Sexton III as Brandon McCarthy
- Eric Mabius as Steve
- Dimitri DeFresco as Ralphy
- Victoria Davis as Lolita
- Christina Brucato as Cookie
- Christina Vidal as Cynthia
- Amouris Rainey as Darla
- Siri Howard as Chrissy
- Telly Pontidis as Jed
- Herbie Duarte as Lance
- Jared Solano as Neko
- Scott Coogan as Troy
- Colleen Kelley Whitcombe as News Reporter
- Josiah Trager as Kenny
- Ken Leung as Barry
- Zsanné Pitta as Ginger Friedman

== Reception and legacy ==
The film was a surprise success, considering it was a relatively low-budget, independently produced film. It garnered critical praise for its view of a pre-teen outcast, and won the Grand Jury Prize for best dramatic feature at the 1996 Sundance Film Festival. Critic Roger Ebert was vocal about his love for the film, giving it four stars out of four and placing it at No. 5 on his "Best of 1996" list.

On the review aggregator website Rotten Tomatoes, the film holds an approval rating of 94% based on 52 reviews, with an average rating of 7.9/10. The website's critics consensus reads, "An outstanding sophomore feature, Welcome to the Dollhouse sees writer-director Todd Solondz mining suburban teen angst for black, biting comedy." On Metacritic, which assigns a weighted average score out of 100 to reviews from mainstream critics, the film received an average score of 83, based on 20 critics, indicating "universal acclaim".

During an appearance for Rotten Tomatoes to promote the film Spider-Man: Homecoming in 2017, filmmaker Jon Watts cited the film as one of his five favorite coming-of-age films, calling it "great".

Awards
Preceded by The Brothers McMullen	Sundance Grand Jury Prize: U.S. Dramatic; 1996	Succeeded by Sunday
