= Palindromes (film) =

2004 film by Todd Solondz

- Theatrical release poster
- Directed by: Todd Solondz
- Written by: Todd Solondz
- Produced by: Mike S. Ryan; Derrick Tseng
- Starring: Matthew Faber; Ellen Barkin; Emani Sledge; Valerie Shusterov; Hannah Freiman; Rachel Corr; Will Denton; Sharon Wilkins; Shayna Levine; Jennifer Jason Leigh
- Narrated by: Maggie Moore
- Cinematography: Tom Richmond
- Edited by: Mollie Goldstein; Kevin Messman
- Music by: Nathan Larson
- Production companies: Celluloid Dreams; Extra Large Pictures
- Distributed by: Wellspring
- Release dates: September 3, 2004 (Venice); April 13, 2005 (United States)
- Running time: 100 minutes
- Countries: United States; France
- Languages: English; Hebrew
- Box office: $707,269

Palindromes is a 2004 American comedy drama film written and directed by Todd Solondz. It follows a 13-year-old girl named Aviva and her quest to become a mother. Aviva is notably played by eight different actors of different ages, races, and genders over the course of the film, which is divided into chapters.

The film premiered on September 3, 2004 at the Venice Film Festival, where it was nominated for the Golden Lion. It received a limited theatrical release in North America on April 13, 2005. Monument Releasing and Visit Films, in conjunction with the Museum of Modern Art, screened a 4K restoration of the film on March 12, 2025. The restoration was released digitally on May 20, 2025.

== Plot ==
The film opens with a funeral for Dawn Wiener who went to college, gained a lot of weight and acne, and committed suicide at age 20 after she became pregnant from a date rape. Her older brother Mark reads the eulogy while Dawn's tearful parents sit in the audience and seem to finally show remorse over the way they mistreated her as a child. Dawn's younger sister whom she was estranged from, Missy, does not attend the funeral. One of the attendees is Aviva, Dawn's cousin.

A few years later, Aviva desires to have a child. She has sex with Judah, a family friend, and becomes pregnant. Aviva's parents are horrified and demand that she get an abortion. While the abortion is technically successful, it is implied via a fractured, emotional conversation with the doctor that Aviva can no longer have children. Not fully conscious, Aviva is unaware of this, and her parents, already fragile, lead her to believe all is well when she awakens, afraid to upset Aviva.

Aviva runs away from home. She befriends a trucker and has sex with him; however, the trucker abandons her at a motel. She is eventually found by the Sunshine Family, a Christian fundamentalist foster home that cares for disordered orphans and runaways. She tells them her name is Henrietta — the name she picked for the baby she was persuaded to abort. While at the Sunshine Family home, she discovers a dark side to the foster father; he assassinates abortion providers. His next target is the doctor who performed Aviva's abortion. The hitman whom the foster father uses is the same trucker Aviva previously befriended and had sex with.

Convinced she is in love with the truck driver, Aviva flees the Sunshine Family to join him on his assignment. The murder does not go as planned as, in addition to the doctor himself, the trucker (whose name is revealed to be Bob) ends up accidentally shooting the doctor's young daughter when she steps in front of the first shot. The police find Bob and Aviva both in a motel room, and a guilt-ridden Bob commits suicide by cop.

The film then skips ahead several months later to Aviva back home with her parents, planning her next birthday party. During the party, she talks to her cousin, Mark, who has recently been arrested and accused of molesting his sister Missy's baby (although he denies having done it and it is loosely implied that Missy might have made it up for attention). Mark tells Aviva that there is no such thing as free will; people are what they were genetically “programmed” to be, and can never truly change. The film skips ahead to Aviva's meeting Judah, who now calls himself Otto, and they have sex again. Afterward, Aviva happily exclaims that she has a feeling that, this time, she is going to be a mother.

== Cast ==
- Matthew Faber as Mark Wiener
- Angela Pietropinto as Mrs. Wiener
- Bill Buell as Harvey Wiener
- Ellen Barkin as Joyce Victor
- Richard Masur as Steve Victor
- Hillary Bailey Smith as Robin Wallace
- Danton Stone as Bruce Wallace
- Robert Agri as First Judah
- John Gemberling as Second Judah
- Stephen Singer as Dr. Fleisher
- Stephen Adly Guirgis as Joe/Earl/Bob
- Debra Monk as Mama Sunshine
- Walter Bobbie as Bo Sunshine
- Tyler Maynard as Jiminy
- David Castro as Carlito
- Richard Riehle as Dr. Dan
- Maggie Moore as Voice of Christian narrator
- Sydney Matuszak as Ell

=== Actors playing Aviva ===
- Emani Sledge (segment "Dawn")
- Valerie Shusterov (segment "Judah")
- Hannah Freiman (segment "Henry")
- Rachel Corr (segment "Henrietta")
- Will Denton (segment "Huckleberry")
- Sharon Wilkins (segment "Mama Sunshine")
- Shayna Levine (segment "Bob")
- Jennifer Jason Leigh (segment "Mark")

== Production ==
Solondz gained inspiration for the screenplay from the case of Eric Rudolph, an anti-abortion activist charged with the 1998 bombing of an Alabama abortion clinic. Said Solondz: "To be an abortionist today in the States is, to my mind, very heroic. Who wants to put their lives on the line? You get assassinated, there are bombs in the clinics. There are so many other easier ways to make a living. You put yourself in a very vulnerable place if you do choose that calling."

Solondz's idea to cast different actors to play the same role sprang from theater and television, where it is a common practice. "I felt like coming upon different actors as the film progressed would make perhaps a richer kind of experience—to see what each of them, unwittingly even, could bring to this character, Aviva," he said. The film is dedicated to and references Dawn Wiener, the protagonist from Solondz's 1995 film Welcome to the Dollhouse.

Solondz financed the film himself after being unable to find backers.

== Reception ==
Palindromes holds a 43% rating on Rotten Tomatoes based on 117 reviews. The site's critical consensus states: "Unique but cold". On Metacritic, the film has a score of 53 out of 100 based on 36 critics' reviews, indicating "mixed or average" reviews. The film grossed $553,368 in the domestic box office and $707,269 worldwide after almost 23 weeks in theatrical release.

Some critics questioned Solondz's use of various actors to portray Aviva. In a positive review for the Los Angeles Times, Carina Chocano posited, "Part of the idea [for casting different actors] is to toy with notions of audience identification...But mostly, the distancing device underscores the film's central question: Our culture is steeped in the mythology of transformation, transcendence and reinvention, but is it really possible for people to fundamentally change who they are? Do motherhood, religion, plastic surgery, money or therapy have the power to save us from ourselves?" Praise was given to the cast, particularly Ellen Barkin, Debra Monk, and Sharon Wilkins.

Roger Ebert awarded the film 3 and ½ stars, writing "If the movie is a moral labyrinth, it is paradoxically straightforward and powerful in the moment; each individual story has an authenticity and impact of its own." He praised Solondz's experimental casting, commenting "Consider the pathos brought to Aviva by the actress Sharon Wilkins, who is a plus-size adult black woman playing a little girl, and who creates perhaps the most convincing little girl of them all. Or Jennifer Jason Leigh, three times as old as Aviva but barely seeming her age. These individual segments are so effective that at the end of each one we know how we feel, and why. It's just that the next segment invalidates our conclusions."

In the Seattle Post-Intelligencer, Sean Axmaker wrote, "The eternal optimist in a callous world, Aviva is Solondz's Candide, or perhaps an Alice in Solondzland, never less than trusting or forgiving even while enduring terrible ordeals. Solondz appreciates that goodness and for once doesn't seem to be punishing that trust, though he paints the rest of the social world in shades of hypocrisy." In The Washington Post, Desson Thomson acknowledged Solondz's satirization of both red and blue state values, adding "the [film] isn't for everyone. But it amounts to intellectual penicillin for our sequel-driven, franchise-heavy entertainment culture".

Contrarily, New York Times film critic A. O. Scott concluded in his negative review, "[...] Aviva's appearance changes — from black to white, from fat to thin, from brunette to redhead, and at one point, to Jennifer Jason Leigh. The effect of this switching is to keep you off balance and at a remove from the story. That is not such a bad thing, because you will want to be as far away as possible." In The Guardian, Peter Bradshaw wrote, "Palindromes is not simply a black comedy, but a fascinating formal challenge to the audience." Other critics described the film as narratively scattered. In Entertainment Weekly, Owen Gleiberman concluded, "Palindromes isn't flawless, yet it's an experience to love, to hate, to fight with and to meld your mind with."

== Home media ==
The DVD was released on September 13, 2005. It was released on Blu-ray and Ultra HD Blu-ray by Radiance Films on June 24, 2025.

== Soundtrack ==
1. "Lullaby (Aviva's and Henrietta's Theme)" — written by Nathan Larson; performed by Nina Persson and Nathan Larson
2. "Up on a Cloud" — written by Larson; performed by Persson and Larson
3. "Piano Concerto No. 1 in B-flat minor, Op. 23" — written by Pyotr Ilyich Tchaikovsky
4. "Nobody Jesus But You" — written by Eytan Mirsky, Curtis Moore, and Matthew Brookshire; performed by Ricky Ashley, Curtis Moore, Karen Rodriguez, and The Sunshine Singers
5. "Fight for the Children" — written by Mirsky, Moore, and Brookshire; performed by Ashley, Moore, Rodriguez, and The Sunshine Singers
6. "Doctor Dan" — written by Mirsky, Moore, and Brookshire; performed by Ashley, Moore, Rodriguez, and The Sunshine Singers
7. "Love Turned Blue" — written by Jai Josefs; performed by Shelly Rand and The Nashville Six
8. "Somebody Loved" — written by Deb Talan and Steve Tannen; performed by The Weepies
9. "This Is the Way" — written by Mirsky, Moore, and Brookshire; performed by Ashley, Moore, Rodriguez, and The Sunshine Singers
