= Sharon Wilkins =

American actress

- Born: Newburgh, New York, U.S.
- Occupations: Film, stage, television actress
- Years active: 2000–2015

Sharon Wilkins is an American actress. She is from Newburgh, New York and lives on the Upper West Side of Manhattan in New York City, New York. She has had several roles on Broadway and in film and does some commercial work.

== Career ==
Wilkins appeared in the national tour of Xanadu. She has appeared in three Broadway musicals, first Life in 1997, followed by Seussical in 2000 and All Shook Up in 2005.

Since 2005, she has been focusing mostly on television and film work appearing in shows including Law and Order: Special Victims Unit, 30 Rock and Rescue Me and such films as National Treasure (2004) and We Own the Night (2007).

She is active in Broadway Cares/Equity Fights AIDS.

== Filmography ==
=== Film ===
Year	Title	Role	Notes
2001	Double Whammy	Techa	
2002	Two Weeks Notice	Polly St. Clair	
2002	Maid in Manhattan	Clarice	
2003	Bad Boys II	Woman in TV store	
2004	Palindromes	Aviva	Segment, "Mama Sunshine"
2004	National Treasure	Butcher clerk	
2004	I, Robot	Asthmatic Woman	
2004	From Other Worlds	Jill	
2008	Gigantic	Linda	
2009	Did You Hear About the Morgans?	U.S. Marshal King	
2011	Win Win	Judge Lee	
2011	My Last Day Without You	Eena	
2012	Dreaming American	Judge	Short
2012	Jewtopia	Nurse Boo	
2012	Dog Eat Dog	Ruth	Short
2013	Shoes!	Cobra / Wuzzy (voice)	Short
2014	Lucky Stiff	Vinny's Nurse	

=== Television ===
Year	Title	Role	Notes
2000	Wonderland	Mrs. Brown	Recurring role
2002	100 Centre Street		"End of the Month"
2003	Third Watch	Gwen	"Everybody Lies"
2003	Law & Order: Special Victims Unit	Janace Tashjian	"Manic"
2004	The Goodbye Girl	Mrs. Crosby	TV film
2006	30 Rock	Angie Jordan	"Jack the Writer"
2007	Law & Order: Special Victims Unit	Nurse Manager	"Outsider"
2007	Rescue Me	Latrina	"Cycle", "Keefe", "Yaz"
2012	GCB	Bethany May	"Love is Patient"
2015	Hug-O-Gram	Miss Schwinnegar	"Mark Rhyne's Hug-O-Gram", "Golden Showers"
2015	Episodes	Nurse #1	"Episode 6"
2015	Switched at Birth	Probation officer	"And It Cannot Be Changed", "I Lock the Door Upon Myself", "Art Like Love Is Dedication"
