= The S.O.U.L. Tape 2 =

Mixtape by Fabolous
- Released: November 22, 2012
- Recorded: 2012
- Genre: Hip hop
- Labels: Desert Storm, Def Jam
- Producers: StreetRunner, Teddy Da Don, C-Sick, Mally The Martian, The Arsenals, Sarah J, John Scino, Cardiak, AraabMuzik, Sonaro, Just Blaze, J. Cole, Makkis

Fabolous chronology
There Is No Competition 3: Death Comes in 3's (2011)	The S.O.U.L. Tape 2 (2012)	The S.O.U.L. Tape 3 (2013)

The S.O.U.L. Tape 2 is the seventh mixtape by American rapper Fabolous. It was released on November 22, 2012, by Desert Storm Records and Def Jam Recordings. The mixtape features guest appearances from Broadway, J. Cole, Pusha T, Troy Ave, Trey Songz, Cassie, Wale, Joe Budden and Teyana Taylor.

== Background ==
The mixtape was announced on October 22, 2012. On November 7, 2012, the first song was released in promotion of the mixtape titled "For The Love". On December 12, 2012, the music video for "For The Love" was released. On December 30, 2012, the music video for "Life Is So Exciting" featuring Pusha T & Ivor was released. The music video was released for "B.I.T.E.". On April 22, 2013, the music video was released for "We Get High". On July 30, 2013, the music video was released for "Guess Who's Bizzack" featuring Broadway.

== Critical response ==
Professional ratings
Review scores
Source	Rating
AllHipHop	7.5/10

Ron Johnson of AllHipHop gave the mixtape seven and a half stars out of ten, saying "Fab’s favorite hook supplier, Lil Mo, is surely missed on songs like “Life Is So Exciting” and “Only Life I know”, which could be much better without Loso on hook duty. Perhaps Fab should put in an ad for a full-time singer for tracks like these, but in the meantime, features like Pusha T's signature flow of balling out control on “Life Is So Exciting” is sure to hold fans over. If you were expecting Fab to really bare his soul on Soul Tape 2, you have to settle for a peek because Loso is just too laid back for that. He might not layout a scenario that can make you feel as though he might have been through the same challenges as you, but that doesn't mean his slick schemes and sneaky punchlines can't give you as much goosebumps and screw-faces as any Soul singer could. NICE!."

== Track listing ==
No.	Title	Producer(s)	Length
1.	"Transformation"	Just Blaze	3:58
2.	"For The Love"	StreetRunner	2:57
3.	"B.I.T.E."	Teddy Da Don	3:57
4.	"We Get High"	C-Sick	4:16
5.	"Diamonds"	Mally The Martian	4:12
6.	"Guess Whos Bizzack" (featuring Broadway)	Mally The Martian	3:26
7.	"Louis Vuitton" (featuring J. Cole)	J. Cole	4:56
8.	"Life Is So Exciting" (featuring Pusha T)	The Arsenals, Sarah J	4:04
9.	"Only Life I Know" (featuring Troy Ave)	John Scino	5:38
10.	"Diced Pineapples" (featuring Trey Songz and Cassie)	Cardiak	5:30
11.	"Beauty" (featuring Wale)	AraabMuzik	3:21
12.	"Want You Back" (featuring Joe Budden and Teyana Taylor)	Sonaro	5:45
