= Matthew Faber =

American actor (1973–2020)

- Born: January 31, 1973; York, Pennsylvania, U.S.
- Died: March 28, 2020 (aged 47); Los Angeles, California, U.S
- Occupation: Actor

Matthew Faber (January 31, 1973 – March 28, 2020) was an American actor best known for his roles in films and television series such as Welcome to the Dollhouse, Natural Born Killers, Law & Order and Palindromes.

Faber died at his Van Nuys, Los Angeles home at the age of 47 of natural causes.

== Filmography ==
- Darrow (as Henry Coll)
- Bob Roberts (as Calvin)
- Fresh (as Long Hair Teenager)
- Natural Born Killers (as Kid #1)
- Stonewall (as Mizz Moxie)
- Welcome to the Dollhouse (as Mark Wiener)
- Law & Order (as Scott Wilder, 1 episode)
- A Little Tenderness (as Pete)
- The Pallbearer (as Jared)
- Sue (as Sven)
- L.A. Without a Map (as Joel)
- Sugar: The Fall of the West
- Restless (as Ben Gold)
- Ride with the Devil (as Turner Rawls)
- Hard Luck (as Eric Billings)
- Palindromes (as Mark Wiener)
- The Devil You Know (as Harry)
