= Wiener-Dog (film) =

2016 American film by Todd Solondz

- Theatrical release poster
- Directed by: Todd Solondz
- Written by: Todd Solondz
- Produced by: Megan Ellison; Christine Vachon
- Starring: Ellen Burstyn; Kieran Culkin; Julie Delpy; Danny DeVito; Greta Gerwig; Tracy Letts; Zosia Mamet
- Cinematography: Edward Lachman
- Edited by: Kevin Messman
- Music by: James Lavino; Nathan Larson
- Production companies: Annapurna Pictures; Killer Films
- Distributed by: Amazon Studios; IFC Films
- Release dates: January 22, 2016 (Sundance); June 24, 2016 (United States)
- Running time: 88 minutes
- Country: United States
- Language: English
- Box office: $700,000

Wiener-Dog is a 2016 American anthology comedy film directed and written by Todd Solondz. Starring an ensemble cast led by Ellen Burstyn, Kieran Culkin, Julie Delpy, Danny DeVito, Greta Gerwig, Tracy Letts, and Zosia Mamet, the film is a spin-off from Solondz's 1995 film Welcome to the Dollhouse, which also features the character of Dawn Wiener. The film is also inspired by the 1966 French drama Au hasard Balthazar, directed by Robert Bresson.

The film had its world premiere at the 2016 Sundance Film Festival on January 22, 2016. before receiving a limited release on June 24, 2016, by Amazon Studios and IFC Films.

== Plot ==
Danny brings his cancer-surviving son Remi a wiener dog. His wife Dina does not want to deal with caring for the dog, but Danny informs her Remi is mature and old enough to help the two with the responsibilities. Dina brings Wiener-Dog to the vet to get spayed, and on their way, Remi becomes upset. Dina comforts Remi by telling him an embellished story about her childhood dog, which she claims died after giving birth to a litter of stillborn puppies. During Dina and Danny's yoga class, Remi and Wiener-Dog tear up the couch cushions and cover the living room in feathers. Wiener-Dog wanders off into the kitchen, and Remi feeds her a chocolate chip granola bar. Wiener-Dog becomes very ill and spreads diarrhea around the house. The next day, Danny brings Wiener-Dog to the vet to be euthanized.

At the vet, veterinary nurse Dawn Wiener takes Wiener-Dog from the consultation room before the vet can euthanise her. She brings Wiener-Dog home with her, where she nurses the dog back to health. It is loosely implied that she is estranged from her family. One day while shopping for pet food, she runs into her childhood boyfriend (from junior high) Brandon, who invites her to visit his brother Tommy and his wife April, both with Down syndrome, in Ohio. Dawn agrees, and the two head off to Ohio, where they come across homesick Mexican hitchhikers. Once they arrive in Ohio, Brandon informs his brother that their father had died due to alcoholism. Tommy asks Brandon to stop doing drugs, and Brandon promises he has stopped, even though he was shown injecting drugs earlier in the trip. Dawn offers to leave Wiener-Dog with Tommy and April, who happily accept. On their way home, Dawn and Brandon talk about their future together and happily hold hands.

During an intermission, Wiener-Dog is seen wandering across the United States, via strip clubs, motels and crime scenes.

Wiener-Dog then arrives with Dave Schmerz, a screenwriting professor who is attempting to get his second screenplay off the ground. One day at work, Schmerz is informed that various students and administration members are complaining about his constant negativity. In the meeting, he tearfully explains that he had tried to put real emotion into his script, but he compromised and added funny elements to make it more commercial, thus ruining it. Schmerz is asked to attend a discussion with a previous student who became a famous film director, who mocks Schmerz's teaching and encourages the students to drop out. Schmerz creates a bomb and attaches it to Wiener-Dog. Students notice and contact authorities. Schmerz is stopped by authorities investigating the incident on the way home and willingly identifies himself.

Elderly Nana, who lives with her caregiver Yvette, is Wiener-Dog's final owner. She names her "Cancer." Nana receives a call from her granddaughter Zoe, who is on her way to visit for the first time in several years, along with her boyfriend Fantasy, a conceptual artist. Once Zoe arrives, she asks for money in order to pay for Fantasy's new art project. Nana agrees to give her the money. While filling out the check, Zoe confides in her Nana, wondering if Fantasy is cheating on her. Once Zoe leaves, Nana goes outside and sits with Wiener-Dog, where she dreams about a younger version of herself coming back to show her what her life could have been if she had been more positive. She wakes up to discover Wiener-Dog has run away, and sees the dog run over and killed by a truck.

Six months later, a stuffed animatronic Wiener-Dog is displayed in Fantasy's art exhibit.

== Cast ==
First story

- Keaton Nigel Cooke as Remi
- Tracy Letts as Danny
- Julie Delpy as Dina

Second story

- Greta Gerwig as Dawn Wiener
- Kieran Culkin as Brandon McCarthy
- Haraldo Alvarez as Luis
- Rigoberto Garcia as Jose
- Dain Eulogio-Victoriano as Jose Luis
- Connor Long as Tommy
- Bridget Brown as April

Intermission

Third story

- Danny DeVito as Dave Schmerz
- Sharon Washington as Phillips
- Devin Druid as Dwight
- Trey Silver as Peter Jacobson
- Ari Graynor as Carol Steinhart
- Kett Turton as Director
- Samrat Chakrabarti as Dr. Farhard Rahman
- Trey Gerrald as Zeno
- Clara Mamet as Lina
- Katherine Reis as Rafa
- Charlie Tahan as Warren

Fourth story

- Ellen Burstyn as Nana
  - Melo Ludwig as Young Nana
- Zosia Mamet as Zoe
- Michael Shaw as Fantasy
- Marcella Lowery as Yvette

== Production ==
On October 23, 2014, The Hollywood Reporter reported that Todd Solondz would next write and direct the comedy Wiener-Dog with Julie Delpy and Greta Gerwig attached as stars, Gerwig playing Dawn Wiener. Megan Ellison would produce and finance through Annapurna Pictures, with Christine Vachon also producing through Killer Films. On June 24, 2015, the complete cast of the film was announced, which included Brie Larson, Kieran Culkin, Zosia Mamet, Danny DeVito, Ellen Burstyn, and Tracy Letts. Ed Lachman served as the film's cinematographer. Solondz initially wrote the script several years prior to making the film, but was unable to find financing.

=== Filming ===
Principal photography on the film began on June 24, 2015. Filming lasted a total of 30 days, with shooting taking place in and around New York City and Nyack, New York.

=== Post-production ===
During post-production, Brie Larson was cut out of the film.

=== Music ===
James Lavino and Nathan Larson composed the film's score. "The Ballad of Wiener-Dog", a song from the film, was short listed for Best Original Song at the 89th Academy Awards.

== Release ==
In December 2015, two images from the film were released, including one of Gerwig. The film had its world premiere at the Sundance Film Festival on January 22, 2016. It went onto screen at the Seattle International Film Festival on May 29, 2016. Shortly after, it was announced that Amazon Studios had acquired distribution rights to the film. In April 2016, it was announced IFC Films would be partnering with Amazon on releasing the film. The film was released on June 24, 2016. The film was released in the United Kingdom on August 12, 2016, by Picturehouse Entertainment.

== Reception ==
Wiener-Dog received positive reviews from film critics. It holds a 74% approval rating on review aggregator website Rotten Tomatoes, based on 108 reviews, with an average rating of 6.6/10. The website's critical consensus reads, "For filmgoers predisposed to enjoy Todd Solondz' brand of black comedy, Wiener-Dog won't disappoint — but those put off by previous works need not apply." On Metacritic, the film holds a rating of 66 out of 100, based on 34 critics, indicating "Generally favorable reviews".

Guy Lodge of Variety gave the film a positive review, writing: "Each of their mini-narratives plays out in the pause-heavy mode of highly mannered mundanity that will feel entirely natural to Solondz acolytes — and, it seems, to the actors, most of whom tackle the director’s customarily arch dialogue with brusque aplomb. Delpy, in particular, was born to deliver his harshest words, though it’s Burstyn — using very few at all, her set face shifting and falling as the script lends reasoning to her froideur — whom viewers might find themselves unable to shake." Todd McCarthy of The Hollywood Reporter gave the film a positive review writing: "These last minutes are the best in the film and by far the most visually dazzling, even though Ed Lachman’s cinematography throughout stands as a model of subtle and elegant compositional skill tested by what are, for the most part, deliberately banal settings." World Socialist Web Site reviewer David Walsh gave the film a positive review, commenting that "the hostility directed toward the contemporary art and film scene is perhaps the strongest feature of Wiener-Dog."
