= Tyler Maynard =

American stage and film actor (born 1978)

- Born: September 27, 1978 (age 48); New Carlisle, Ohio, U.S.
- Education: University of Cincinnati (BFA)
- Occupation: Actor
- Years active: 2002–present

Tyler Maynard (born September 27, 1978) is an American stage and film actor. He is best known for playing Mark in the 2005 musical Altar Boyz, for which he won a Theatre World Award and received a nomination for a Drama Desk Award.

== Biography ==
Maynard grew up in New Carlisle, Ohio, with one older and one younger sister named Brooke and Ashley respectively. His mother is a high school English teacher. He was a self-described "shy" child, whose dream was to become a marine biologist. He was part of his school choir, and by the sixth grade he landed his first professional acting role at the La Comedia Dinner Theatre. He attended Tecumseh High School. From 1993 to 1997 while in high school, Maynard joined the Muse Machine where he starred in Peter Pan, The Wizard of Oz, The Music Man, Oliver and Me and My Girl.

When he was 18, Maynard was accepted at the College Conservatory of Music at the University of Cincinnati where, among other productions, he starred as Otto Kringelein in Grand Hotel, and had a lead role in Godspell. After graduating in 2001, Maynard moved to New York City where he worked as a doorman at the Hudson Hotel for four months.

His Broadway debut was in 2002 in the musical Mamma Mia!. In 2003 and 2004 he appeared in several stage productions, including On the Record, and during that time he also worked shooting roles in the films Palindromes, Parents Wanted and Red Doors. In February 2005 he landed a starring role in Altar Boyz, a musical which achieved significant critical acclaim. Theater critic Charles Isherwood of The New York Times wrote, "none grabs [the spotlight] quite as ferociously as Tyler Maynard... Mr. Maynard's deliciously overwrought performance is both an affectionate tribute to and a parody of American Idol-style vocal histrionics. It typifies the sly manner in which the musical manages to exploit the appeal of the pop genre it's parodying even as it accentuates its silliness." Critic Jason Zinoman, also of the Times, wrote, "In the original production, the charismatic Tyler Maynard received most of the critics' attention as the flamingly gay (even if he doesn't admit it) singer Mark." For his role as Mark, Maynard earned a Drama Desk Award nomination, and won Outstanding Breakthrough Actor at the Theatre World Awards. From August to October 2005, Maynard took a break from performing in Altar Boyz to perform in the shows Miracle Brothers and The Great Big Radio Show!. Maynard resumed his performance in Altar Boyz in January 2006. From 2008 to 2009, he played Flotsam in the original Broadway cast of The Little Mermaid. In 2010, he played Chad in the off-Broadway musical The Kid.

Tyler Maynard is a member of the singing group, The Broadway Boys.

== Filmography ==
| Year | Film/television | Role |
|---|---|---|
| 2005 | Red Doors | Trent |
| 2004 | Palindromes | Jiminy |
| 2004 | Parents Wanted | Johnny |
| 2011 | Dark Horse | Jiminy |
