= Ghost Light Projects =

Canadian theatre company

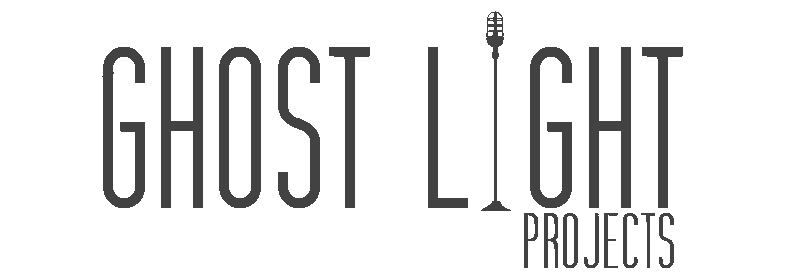
Ghost Light Projects logo

Ghost Light Projects was a registered non profit theatre society founded in 2009 by Randie Parliament and T.J. Tasker in Toronto, Ontario, Canada. In the autumn of 2012, the company relocated and incorporated in Vancouver, British Columbia, Canada. The company closed in April 2015.

The company was artist-based and focused on LGBT positive themed work.

== History ==
Initially created as a platform to bring Hedwig and the Angry Inch and Debbie Does Dallas: The Musical together as a double bill, the company hit a stride with its run of Off Broadway and independent hits.

== Artistic team ==
- Randie Parliament - Artistic Producer (2009-2015)
- Greg Bishop - Associate Producer (2012-2015)
- Brenda Matthews - Associate Producer (2009-2013)
- T.J. Tasker (2009)

== Production history ==
=== 2014/15 season ===
- "Hedwig and the Angry Inch" by John Cameron Mitchell and Stephen Trask
- "Corpus Christi (play)" by Terrence McNally
- "Exit The King" by Eugene Ionesco, translated by Geoffrey Rush and Neil Armfield
- "The Singing Butler" by Randie Parliament

=== 2013/14 season ===
- The Children's Hour by Lillian Hellman
- Hedwig and the Angry Inch by John Cameron Mitchell and Stephen Trask
- The Boys in the Band by Mart Crowley
- Let's Kill Grandma This Christmas by Brian Gianci
- Clue: The Musical
- Gross Indecency: The Three Trials of Oscar Wilde by Moisés Kaufman

=== 2012/13 season ===
- Baby With the Bathwater by Christopher Durang
- Mother May I by Randie Parliament
- Love! Valour! Compassion! by Terrence McNally

=== 2011/12 season ===
- Mother May I by Randie Parliament
- The Boys in the Band by Mart Crowley
- The Great American Trailer Park Musical by David Nehls and Betsy Kelso

=== 2010/11 season ===
- The Vagina Monologues by Eve Ensler
- The Boys in the Band by Mart Crowley
- The Santaland Diaries by David Sedaris
- The Book of Liz by Amy Sedaris and David Sedaris

=== 2009/10 season ===
- Hedwig and the Angry Inch by John Cameron Mitchell and Stephen Trask
- Debbie Does Dallas: The Musical by Susan L. Schwartz
- Mamma's Boy by Randie Parliament
- Larger Than Life: The Musical by SG Lee

=== Awards ===
Jessie Richardson Theatre Award

- Outstanding Actor - Ryan Alexander McDonald Hedwig And The Angry Inch (play) - Nominated

Ovation Awards

- Outstanding Ensemble Production - Hedwig And The Angry Inch - Nominated
- Outstanding Lead Actor - Ryan Alexander McDonald - Hedwig And The Angry Inch - Nominated

Community Theatre Coalition

- Outstanding Production - The Boys In The Band - Winner!
- Outstanding Musical Production - Hedwig And The Angry Inch (play) - Nominated
- Outstanding Musical Production - Clue The Musical - Nominated
- Outstanding Direction of a Play - Randie Parliament & Greg Bishop - The Boys In The Band - Winner!
- Outstanding Direction of a Musical - Randie Parliament - Clue The Musical - Nominated
- Outstanding Direction of a Musical - Randie Parliament - Hedwig And The Angry Inch - Nominated
- Outstanding Lead Actor in a Musical - Ryan Alexander McDonald - Hedwig And The Angry Inch - Winner!
- Outstanding Lead Actor in a Play - Greg Bishop - Gross Indecency: The Three Trials of Oscar Wilde - Winner!
- Outstanding Lead Actor in a Play - James Dolby - Corpus Christi - Nominated
- Outstanding Supporting Actor in a Musical - Greg Armstrong Morris - Clue The Musical - Nominated
- Outstanding Supporting Actress in a Musical - Stephanie Liatopoulos - Clue The Musical - Winner!
- Outstanding Supporting Actress in a Musical - Meggie McKinnon - Clue The Musical - Nominated
- Outstanding Supporting Actor in a Play - Marco Arimare - The Boys In The Band - Nominated
- Outstanding Supporting Actor in a Play - Mitchell Mackay - Gross Indecency: The Three Trials of Oscar Wilde - Nominated
- Outstanding Supporting Actress in a Play - Kieylla Thornton-Trump - The Singing Butler - Nominated
- Outstanding Choreography - Marco Arimare - Clue The Musical - Nominated
- Outstanding Lighting Design - Darren Boquist - Clue The Musical - Winner!
- Outstanding Lighting Design - Darren Boquist - Corpus Christi - Nominated
- Outstanding Sound Design - Hedwig and The Angry Inch - Nominated
- Outstanding Sound Design - James Coomber - Corpus Christi - '" Winner! "'
- Outstanding Costume Design - Randie Parliament & Brenda Matthews - Hedwig And The Angry Inch - Nominated
- Outstanding Costume Design - Randie Parliament - Clue The Musical - Nominated
- Outstanding Poster Design - Randie Parliament - Corpus Christi - Nominated
- Outstanding Poster Design - Randie Parliament - Exit The King - Nominated

== Community ==
Ghost Light Projects sponsors an Out For Kicks soccer team in Vancouver, BC, Canada.
