= Exodus Lale =

Australian actor (born 2005)

Exodus Lale (born 21 September 2005) is an Australian-born performer, male actor and singer who played Young Simba in Disney's the Lion King Musical Australian tour. He is of Samoan heritage. Exodus is a Christian and is a member of the Sunnybank Uniting Church. Lale played the hooker position for his club Acacia Ridge Magpies Junior Rugby League team which he has been a part of since 2010. Lale won the 2015 Pacific Award for achievement in the Junior Performing Arts Category in New South Wales on 2 September 2015, Best performance in Live Theatre Best Actor at the 37th Annual Gala Young Artist Awards in Los Angeles on 13 March 2016 and was a finalist in the Queensland Young Achiever Awards 2016 where he opened the event and won the People's Choice Award in May 2016.

== Early life ==
Exodus was named after the story of Moses in the Old Testament, chosen by his parents. He is middle-named "Jeremiah" after his father's brother Jerry Lale, his grandfather Jeremiah (Sa'u) Lale and "Norman" after his mother's brother Norman Tupu. He is the eldest of five siblings and the eldest grandson of Sa'u and Fofoga Lale. His father Fa'alafitele Papali'i Tino Lale hails from the Samoan villages of Apolima Uta, Vaiusu and Safune, Savaii. His mother Nicola Tupu Lale hails from the villages of Sinamoga and Satupaitea, Savaii. Exodus portrayed traits of music ability at the age of two when he started to sing in tune. He reached his first soprano note at the age of five years old and secured a solo position in his church choir at the age of six. He performed a solo at a combined Samoan Uniting Church Service in November 2012 at the age of seven. He performed a solo at a Harmony Day parade at his school in 2012. He performed a solo at the age of seven with his choir from the Sunnybank Samoan Uniting Church Choir at the 2013 Queensland Samoan Choir Competition which was held in Brisbane. The choir was placed 4th overall in the competition.

== Career ==
Lale auditioned for the Lion King at the age of eight years old and was successful in landing the role despite being well under the stringent audition age criterion of 10 to 12 for the auditions that were held in Brisbane in June 2014. He travelled to Sydney in August 2014 with his parents and his youngest brother to rehearse for almost three weeks before his first stage performance at the Capitol Theatre, Sydney on 24 August 2014, to which he dedicated his entire performance to his 6 family members lost in the Queensland house fire disaster on 24 August 2011, the three-year anniversary of their deaths. Exodus was six when they perished. Exodus debuted in Brisbane at the Lyric Theatre at QPAC in South Bank, Queensland on Sunday 24 September 2014. Exodus was the only selection from Queensland to open the Melbourne Tour in early 2015. He debuted in Melbourne on the Regent Theatre stage on 14 February 2015. Exodus debuted in Perth on the Crown Theatre stage on 30 January 2016. Exodus is the youngest Simba to be cast worldwide for Disney's the Lion King Musical at the age of eight years old. Exodus was a finalist in the Junior Performing Arts Category of the Pacific Awards 2015 and won the top award at the Awards Ceremony in Sydney, New South Wales in September 2015. He was also nominated for a Young Artist Award in the category for the Best Performance in Live Theatre Young Actor at the 37th Annual Gala Young Artist Awards on Sunday 13 March 2016 in Los Angeles which he won. Exodus was a finalist in the Queensland Young Achiever Awards 2016 where he also opened the event with a performance and won the People's Choice Award. In 2016, Exodus was recognised for his performing arts talent at the 2016 Samoa Independence Day Celebration in Brisbane. In July 2016, Exodus was successful in landing the role of Bruce Bogtrotter for the Brisbane, Perth, Adelaide and New Zealand touring cast of Matilda the Musical the stage musical based on the novel of Road Dahl adapted by Dennis Kelly with music and lyrics by Tim Minchin and commissioned by the Royal Shakespeare Company. Exodus performed at the opening night in Brisbane at the QPAC in South Bank, Queensland on Thursday 1 December 2016 which he received positive reviews for his performance. Exodus also performed at the opening night in Perth at the Crown Perth on Friday 3 March 2017, also to positive critic reviews.

== Other ==
Exodus' grandfather's (Sa'u Jeremiah Lale) younger brother also named Jeremiah Lale, was a survivor of one of the worst house fires in Queensland. Exodus lost his Aunty Jeanette and five cousins – Lale, Lini, Lafoai, Leitioa and Ritchie, who perished in a house fire on 24 August 2011.

Soccer star Tim Cahill donated his match fees to Jeremiah Lale to assist with the loss of his wife and children.

In September 2011, Lale modeled for Fadez Mens Barbershop, for an article in the Queensland Times.

Exodus' aunt Viva Lale is also a singer. She auditioned for the Voice Australia in 2013. Viva accompanied Exodus for a church performance in 2013.

Exodus was featured in the Samoa Times on 27 October 2014.

Exodus was featured in the 12 November 2014 issue of Multiculturalism Matters for the Presbytery of South Moreton for the Uniting Church Australia.

Exodus attended the Gold Coast Film Festival in April 2016.

Exodus was invited to perform for the Association of South Pacific Airlines Conference at the Brisbane Showcase of Lights Dinner that was hosted by Brisbane Airport Corporation and Aviation Australia in December 2015.

Exodus' win at the 37th Annual Gala Young Artist Awards was discussed on Backstage on 14 March 2016.

Exodus was featured in the Courier Mail on 16 March 2016.

Exodus was invited to perform at the South Pacific Tourism Exchange 2016 at Sea World in Gold Coast in May 2016.

Exodus was featured in the May 2016 issue of the Brisbane Families Magazine.

Exodus was featured in the 30 May 2016 issue of the Samoan Observer.

Exodus was featured in the June 2016 issue number 190 of Mania Magazine, an Australian entertainment magazine for children.

Exodus was featured in the July 2016 issue of Journey Magazine for the Uniting Church Australia.

Exodus was invited to perform at the 2016 Logan Raw Conference.

Exodus performed at the 2016 Pacific Unity Festival promoting multiculturalism and celebrating the Pacific Islands.
