= Karen Rodriguez =

Karen Rodriguez can refer to several people:

- Karen Rodriguez (singer)
- Karen Rodriguez (actor)
- Karen Longaric Rodríguez, a Bolivian lawyer and politician
