= Connor Long =

American actor

Connor Robert Long is an American (Maryland-born (July 1994), but Colorado-based) advocate, athlete, actor and speaker.

His acting credits include stage, screen, live action and television. He is a member of SAG-AFTRA.

He is a founding player in the Tapestry Theatre Company, an inclusive all-abilities troupe in Boulder County, Colorado. His film projects, both short and feature, have played festivals around the world and include a premiere at Sundance. He studied with the Colorado Shakespeare Festival School of Theatre. His acclaimed performances resulted in best actor nominations and a win in the Filmstock Film Festival Utah for his work in Menschen. and the Prix D'Interpretation (Best Actor) at the Entr'2 Marches International Film Festival in Cannes, France, for his lead role in the short film, Learning to Drive. He is a 2017 Heartlands Region Emmy-winning contributing reporter for Denver7News (KMGH-ABC) in Denver, Colorado. IHe appeared in the 2016 comedy film Wiener-Dog as Tommy, playing his scenes with Greta Gerwig, Kieran Culkin, and Bridget Brown. He has twice sung the national anthem at home games of the Denver Nuggets NBA team.

He has been recognized by national and international organizations for his advocacy on behalf of people with differing abilities, whether physical or intellectual. He has received awards and recognition from the National Down Syndrome Society, the Council for Exceptional Children, the Global Down Syndrome Foundation, the John Lynch Foundation and the Anna & John J. Sie Foundation, and The Arc of the United States. In 2018, he participated in the “Channel Kindness” year-long social-media reporting program established by Lady Gaga’s Born This Way Foundation.

As an athlete, he has achievements in high school (lettered twice) and Special Olympic competitive swimming. In 2022, he swam in the DSISO World Championships in Albufiera, Portugal, as a member of the USA Down Syndrome Swimming National Team. After learning to ride at age 16, he now cycles to raise funds for medical research and clinical care for Trisomy 21 (Down Syndrome) and related conditions. He enjoys indoor rock climbing. He earned a 1st-degree black belt in taekwondo and a broken ankle at the ninja gym.
