= Ryan Leslie production discography =

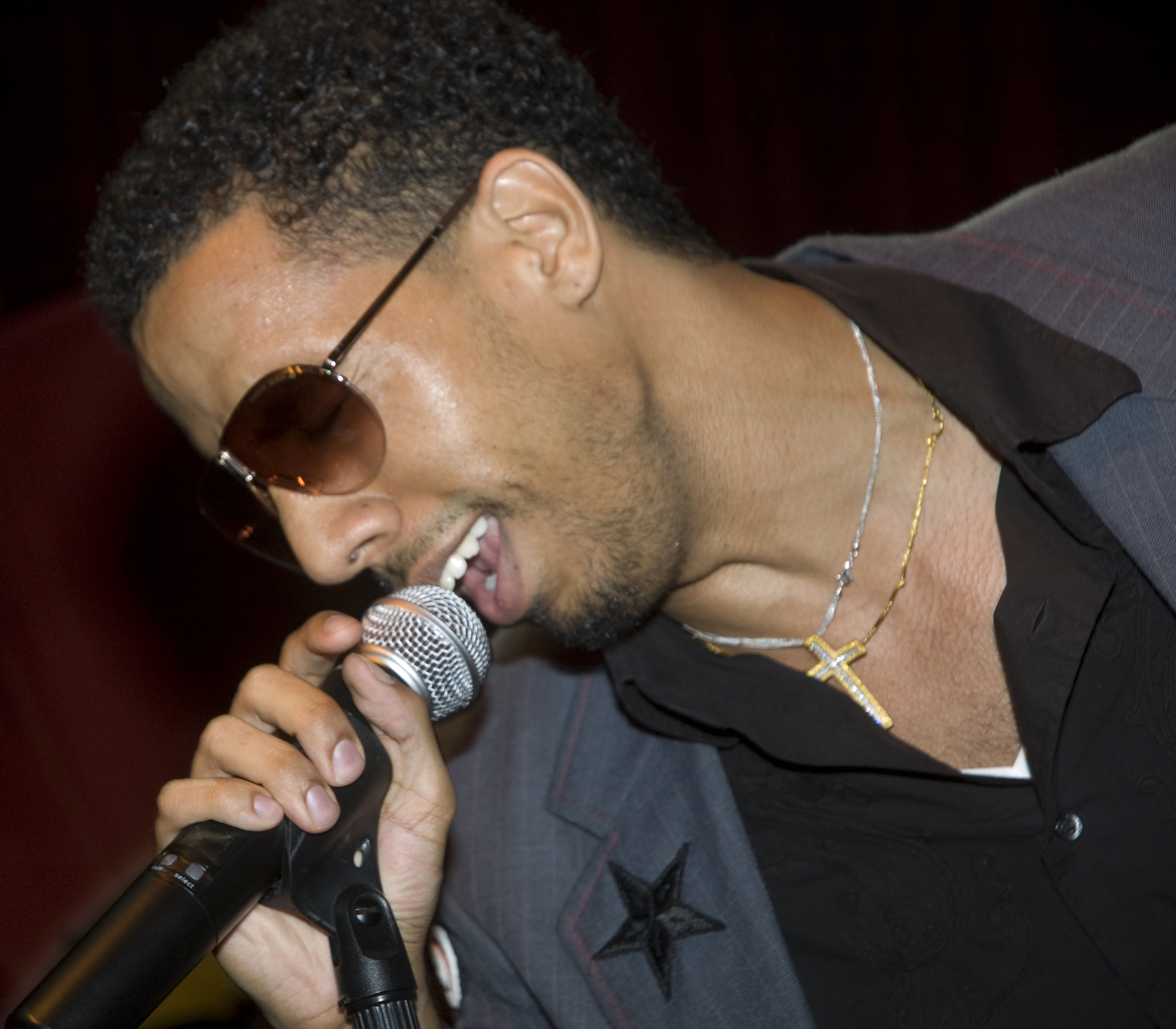

The following list is a discography of production by Ryan Leslie.

== Singles produced ==
| Year | Single | Chart positions | | | | | Album |
| Year | Single | US Hot 100 | US R&B | US Rap | US Pop | UK | Album |
|---|---|---|---|---|---|---|---|
| 2003 | "Down for Me" (Loon featuring Mario Winans) | – | 28 | 19 | – | – | Loon |
| 2004 | "Hot 2Nite" (New Edition) | 87 | 35 | – | – | – | One Love |
| 2006 | "Me & U" (Cassie) | 3 | 3 | – | 3 | 6 | Cassie |
| 2006 | "Long Way 2 Go" (Cassie) | 97 | 115 | – | 86 | 12 | Cassie |
| 2007 | "I Love You" (Cheri Dennis featuring Jim Jones & Yung Joc) | – | 38 | – | – | – | In and Out of Love |
| 2007 | "Diamond Girl" (Ryan Leslie) | 95 | 35 | – | – | – | Ryan Leslie |
| 2008 | "Is It You" (Cassie) | – | – | – | – | 52 | Step Up 2: The Streets (soundtrack) |
| 2008 | "Addiction" (Ryan Leslie featuring Fabolous & Cassie) | 115 | 35 | – | – | – | Ryan Leslie |
| 2008 | "Good Lovin'" (Slim featuring Fabolous & Ryan Leslie) | – | 39 | – | – | – | Love's Crazy |
| 2008 | "How It Was Supposed to Be" (Ryan Leslie) | – | 71 | – | – | – | Ryan Leslie |
| 2009 | "Everything, Everyday, Everywhere" (Fabolous featuring Keri Hilson) | 103 | 31 | 10 | – | – | Loso's Way |
| 2009 | "You're Not My Girl" (Ryan Leslie) | – | 72 | – | – | – | Transition |
| 2010 | "You Be Killin' Em" (Fabolous) | 64 | 8 | 6 | – | – | There Is No Competition 2: The Grieving Music EP |
| 2011 | "So Forgetful" (Lloyd Banks featuring Ryan Leslie) | – | – | – | – | – | H.F.M. 2 (Hunger for More 2) |
| 2011 | "Fly Together" (Red Café featuring Ryan Leslie & Rick Ross) | – | 51 | 23 | – | – | TBA |

== 2003 ==
=== Various artists - Bad Boys II (soundtrack) ===
- 06. "Keep Giving Your Love to Me" (performed by Beyoncé Knowles)

=== Virtue - Free ===
- 02. "Healin'"
- 03. "Jesus Paid The Ransom"

=== Latif - Love in the First ===
- 03. "It's Alright"
- 11. "Rain Will Go Away"
- 12. "Heavenly"
- 13. "I Don't Blame You"

=== Loon - Loon ===
- 05. "Down for Me" (featuring Mario Winans)

=== Britney Spears - In the Zone ===
- 14. "The Answer" (Bonus Track)
- 00. "It Feels Nice"

== 2004 ==
=== Carl Thomas - Let's Talk About It ===
- 03. "That's What You Are" (Interlude)

=== New Edition - One Love ===
- 03. "Hot 2Nite"
- 16. "Feelin' It" (featuring Bun B)

=== Lea - Lost In Your Love (single) ===
- 00. "Lost in Your Love"

== 2005 ==
=== Various artists - Hustle & Flow (soundtrack) ===
- 11. "Lil' Daddy" (performed by Young City & Chopper)

== 2006 ==
=== Cory Gunz - The Apprentice Vol. 3 - Season Finale ===
- 25. "Son of a Gun"

=== Donell Jones - Journey of a Gemini ===
- 02. "Better Start Talking" (featuring Jermaine Dupri)
- 12. "If U Want" (featuring Bun B)
- 16. "Hands on You" (Bonus Track)

=== Tha Dogg Pound - Cali Iz Active ===
- 07. "Heavyweights" (featuring Snoop Dogg)

=== Cassie - Cassie ===
- 01. "Me & U"
- 02. "Long Way 2 Go"
- 03. "About Time"
- 04. "Kiss Me" (featuring Ryan Leslie)
- 05. "Call U Out" (featuring Yung Joc)
- 06. "Just One Night" (featuring Ryan Leslie)
- 07. "Hope You're Behaving" (Interlude)
- 08. "Not With You"
- 09. "Ditto"
- 10. "What Do U Want"
- 11. "Miss Your Touch"

=== Danity Kane - Danity Kane ===
- 08. "Ooh Ahh"
- 12. "Touching My Body"

=== JoJo - The High Road ===
- 06. "Like That"

== 2007 ==
=== Cheri Dennis - In and Out of Love ===
- 02. "I Love You" (featuring Jim Jones & Yung Joc)
- 18. "Ooh La La" (featuring G-Dep) (Bonus Track)

=== J.Y. Park - Back to Stage ===
- 01. "Kiss"

== 2008 ==
=== Ryan Leslie - The Chemist (mixtape) ===
- 10. "Miracle" (Lex featuring Dayshia Alise)
- 18. "My Mistake" (Megan Rochell)
- 21. "6 of 1 Thing (Remix)" (Craig David featuring Ryan Leslie)
- 22. "Can't Take the Music" (Uness)

=== Various artists - Step Up 2: The Streets (soundtrack) ===
- 05. "Is It You" (performed by Cassie)

=== M. Pokora - MP3 ===
- 03. "Don't Give My Love Away" (featuring Ryan Leslie)
- 07. "Tokyo Girl"

=== LL Cool J - Exit 13 ===
- 02. "Old School New School"
- 11. "Like a Radio" (featuring Ryan Leslie)

=== Cory Gunz - The Best Kept Secret ===
- 04. "Get Right Tonight" (featuring Ryan Leslie)

=== Slim - Love's Crazy ===
- 03. "Good Lovin'" (featuring Fabolous & Ryan Leslie)

=== Alfred Abbas ===
- 00. "My Love"

== 2009 ==
=== Ryan Leslie - Ryan Leslie ===
- 01. "Diamond Girl"
- 02. "Addiction" (featuring Cassie & Fabolous)
- 03. "You're Fly"
- 04. "Quicksand"
- 05. "Valentine"
- 06. "Just Right"
- 07. "How It Was Supposed to Be"
- 08. "I-R-I-N-A"
- 09. "Out of the Blue"
- 10. "Shouldn't Have to Wait"
- 11. "Wanna Be Good"
- 12. "Gibberish"

=== Jim Jones - Pray IV Reign ===
- 07. "Precious" (featuring Ryan Leslie)

=== Fabolous - Loso's Way ===
- 05. "Everything, Everyday, Everywhere"(featuring Keri Hilson)
- 10. "The Fabolous Life" (featuring Ryan Leslie)

=== LeToya - Lady Love ===
- 09. "Take Away Love" (featuring Estelle)

=== Ryan Leslie - Transition ===
- 01. "Never Gonna Break Up"
- 02. "Something That I Like" (featuring Pusha T)
- 03. "Zodiac"
- 04. "Is It Real Love?"
- 05. "Sunday Night"
- 06. "You're Not My Girl"
- 07. "To the Top"
- 08. "Nothing"
- 09. "Guardian Angel"
- 10. "All My Love"
- 11. "I Choose You"
- 12. "When We Dance" (Bonus Track)
- 13. "Promise Not 2 Call" (Bonus Track)
- 14. "Rescue U" (Bonus Track)

=== Chris Brown - Graffiti ===
- 06. "Famous Girl"

=== Mary J. Blige - Stronger with Each Tear ===
- 03. "Said and Done"
- 13. "Closer" (US iTunes bonus track)

=== Krys Ivory - Reflections ===
- 02. "Mr. Maybe"
- 04. "Be Next To Ya"

=== Uness - The Seeker Mixtape Vol. 1 ===
- 14. "Would You Love Me"

=== Usher ===
- 00. "Be"

== 2010 ==
=== Latif - Love Is Love ===
- 02. "U Think U Know" (featuring Ryan Leslie)

=== Game - The Red Room ===
- 10. "Everything Red" (featuring Lil Wayne & Birdman)

=== Fabolous - There Is No Competition 2: The Grieving Music EP ===
- 07. "You Be Killin' Em" (produced with Kid Cudi)

=== Ne-Yo - Libra Scale ===
- 05. "Crazy Love" (featuring Fabolous)

=== Lloyd Banks - H.F.M. 2 (Hunger for More 2) ===
- 06. "So Forgetful" (featuring Ryan Leslie)

=== Booba - Lunatic ===
- 18. "Fast Life" (featuring Ryan Leslie)

=== MeLo-X - More Merch ===
- 13. "More Merch"

=== Krys Ivory ===
- 00. "I'll Still Be Yours"
- 00. "Ooh Aah"

== 2011 ==
=== Fabolous - The S.O.U.L. Tape ===
- 14. "Look At Her (Killin’ Em Pt. 2)" (featuring Ne-Yo & Ryan Leslie) (Bonus Track)

=== Game - The R.E.D. Album ===
Leftover

- 00. "Stunt"

=== Jasmine V. - S(HE) BE(LIE)VE(D) ===
- 09. "Hello" (featuring Ryan Leslie)

=== Latif - Love Life ===
- 07. "Things Ain't The Same"
- 09. "Off In Da Club" (featuring Ryan Leslie)

=== Red Café - Fly Together ===
- 00. "Fly Together" (featuring Ryan Leslie & Rick Ross)

== 2012 ==
=== Cory Gunz ===
- 00. "Loco" (featuring Ryan Leslie)

=== Ryan Leslie - Les Is More ===
- 01. "Glory"
- 02. "Beautiful Lie"
- 03. "Good Girl"
- 04. "5 Minute Freshen Up"
- 05. "Dress You to Undress You"
- 06. "Maybachs & Diamonds"
- 07. "Swiss Francs"
- 08. "Ups & Downs (Prelude)"
- 09. "Ups & Downs"
- 10. "Ready or Not"
- 11. "Lovers & Mountains"
- 12. "The Black Flag"
- 13. "Joan of Arc"
- 14. "Beautiful Lie" (Remix) (featuring Fabolous)

== 2013 ==
=== Ryan Leslie - Black Mozart ===
- 01. "Carnival Of Venice" (produced with !llmind)
- 02. "Black Mozart" (produced with Cardiak)
- 03. "Higher" (produced with Cadenza)
- 04. "History" (produced with Cardiak)
- 05. "Lay Down" (produced with !llmind)
- 06. "Full Moon" (produced with WondaGurl)
- 07. "Only The Lonely" (featuring Courtney Bennett) (produced with !llmind)
- 08. "Evacuation" (produced with WondaGurl)
- 09. "Green" (featuring Fabolous) (produced with Cardiak)
- 10. "Bad Chicks" (produced with !llmind)
- 11. "I Love It" (produced with Cadenza)
- 12. "Coke Cans" (produced with Cardiak)

=== Fabolous - The S.O.U.L. Tape 3 ===
- 10. "Lay Down" (featuring Ryan Leslie) (co-produced with !llmind)

== 2015 ==
=== Ryan Leslie - MZRT ===
- 02. "Designer Pain" (produced with Kaui Williams)
- 03. "Mill"ns" (produced with Danny Ives and DMR)
- 04. "Never Break Down" (produced with David Sylvester)
- 06. "No Prisoners" (produced with No Genre)
- 07. "Ride For Each Other" (produced with !llmind)
- 08. "Sounds" (featuring Bobby V) (produced with KQuick)
- 10. "The Wood" (produced with Kaui Williams)
- 12. "Wings Up"

=== Ne-Yo ===
- 00. "Us Like We"

== Other ==
=== Duck Sauce - Quack ===
- 10. "Barbra Streisand" (additional keyboards)

=== Jeezy - Pressure ===
- 11. "The Life" (featuring Wizkid & Trey Songz) (composer, piano)

=== Red Soda - Waves ===
- 04. "Under The Bridge" (guitar)

=== Mitch Murder - Selection 6 ===
- 12. "Beach Interlude Redux" (guitar)
