= Ryan Leslie discography =

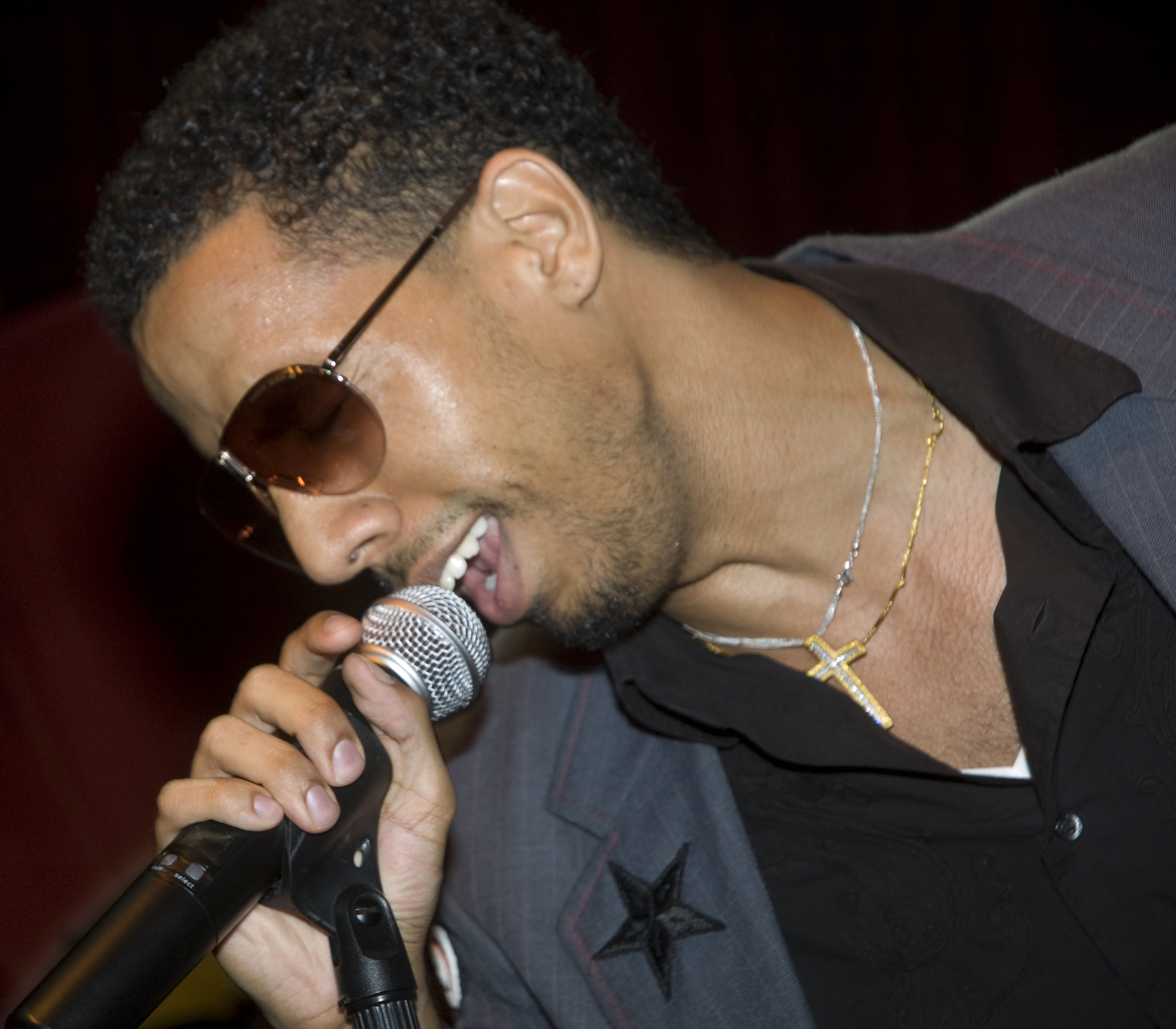
- Leslie performing in July 2006
- Studio albums: 6
- Extended plays: 1
- Singles: 5
- Music videos: 12

The discography of Ryan Leslie, an American hip hop and R&B record producer, singer-songwriter, multi-instrumentalist and occasional rapper, consists of six studio albums, one extended play, nine singles (including four as a featured artist) and twelve music videos.

== Studio albums ==
List of albums, with selected chart positions
Title	Album details	Peak chart positions	
Title	Album details	US	US R&B
Ryan Leslie	Released: November 15, 2008; Label: NextSelection, Casablanca, Universal Motown; Format: CD, digital download	35	9
Transition	Released: November 3, 2009; Label: NextSelection, Casablanca, Universal Motown; Format: CD, digital download	50	4
Les Is More	Released: October 22, 2012; Label: NextSelection, RED, Sony; Format: CD, digital download	74	12
Black Mozart	Released: August 31, 2013; Label: Disruptive Multimedia, NextSelection; Format: CD, digital download	—	—
MZRT	Released: July 4, 2015; Label: Disruptive Multimedia, NextSelection; Format: CD, digital download	—	—
You Know My Speed	Released: February 2, 2024; Label: Black Phoenix Enterprise, LLC.; Format: digital download, streaming, vinyl	—	—
"—" denotes a title that did not chart, or was not released in that territory.

=== Miscellaneous ===
List of miscellaneous albums, with selected information
Title	Album details	Notes
Just Right	Released: 2005 (UK); Label: Casablanca; Format: Bootleg	Originally meant to be released as Leslie's debut studio album; however, it was never officially released due to creative differences between Leslie and his record label.

== EPs ==
List of EPs, with selected details
Title	EP details
Fleurier Flows	Released: January 18, 2019; Label: Black Phoenix Enterprises LLC; Format: digital download

== Singles ==
=== As lead artist ===
List of singles by title, year and peak chart positions, and album
Title	Year	Peak chart positions		Album
Title	Year	US	US R&B	Album
"Diamond Girl"	2007	95	35	Ryan Leslie
"Addiction" (featuring Cassie and Fabolous)	2008	115	35	Ryan Leslie
"How It Was Supposed to Be"	2008	—	71	Ryan Leslie
"You're Not My Girl"	2009	—	72	Transition
"Glory"	2011	—	—	Les Is More
"Beautiful Lie"	2012	—	—	Les Is More
"Carnival of Venice"	2013	—	—	Black Mozart
"Lay Down"	2014	—	—	Black Mozart
"New New"	2014	—	—	MZRT
"Who Wears the Crown"	2015	—	—	MZRT
"No Prisoners"	2015	—	—	MZRT
"Thankful"	2019	—	—	Fleurier Flows
"Forever My Love"	2019	—	—	Fleurier Flows
"Run It Back"	2023	—	—	You Know My Speed
"—" denotes releases that did not chart or receive certification.

=== As featured artist ===
List of singles by title, year and peak chart positions, and album
Title	Year	Peak chart positions		Album
Title	Year	US	US R&B	Album
"Good Lovin'" (Slim featuring Fabolous and Ryan Leslie)	2008	—	39	Love's Crazy
"Start It Up" (Lloyd Banks featuring Ryan Leslie, Kanye West, Swizz Beatz and Fabolous)	2010	105	52	H.F.M. 2 (The Hunger for More 2)
"So Forgetful" (Lloyd Banks featuring Ryan Leslie)	2011	—	—	H.F.M. 2 (The Hunger for More 2)
"Fly Together" (Red Café featuring Rick Ross and Ryan Leslie)	2011	—	44	ShakeDown
"—" denotes releases that did not chart or receive certification.

== Guest appearances ==
List of non-single guest appearances, with other performing artists, showing year released and album name
Title	Year	Other artist(s)	Album
"Kiss Me"	2006	Cassie	Cassie
"Just One Night"	2006	Cassie	Cassie
"Sometimes"	2007	Cassie	—N/a
"6 of 1 Thing" (Remix)	2008	Craig David	The Chemist Mixtape
"Don't Give My Love Away"	2008	M. Pokora	MP3
"Like a Radio"	2008	LL Cool J	Exit 13
"Get Right Tonight"	2008	Cory Gunz	The Best Kept Secret
"Precious"	2009	Jim Jones	Pray IV Reign
"The Fabolous Life"	2009	Fabolous	Loso's Way
"Be Next to Ya"	2009	Krys Ivory	Reflections
"Hustler's Anthem '09" (Remix)	2009	Busta Rhymes, T-Pain, OJ da Juiceman, Gucci Mane	—N/a
"I Know" (Remix)	2009	Bluey Robinson	—N/a
"Find You"	2010	Brandon Hines	In Search Of...
"Fast Life"	2010	Booba	Lunatic
"Christian Dior Denim Flow"	2010	Kanye West, Kid Cudi, Pusha T, John Legend, Lloyd Banks	GOOD Fridays
"We On"	2010	Game	—N/a
"I'm Ill" (Remix)	2010	Red Café, Lloyd Banks, Claudette Ortiz	—N/a
"Spotlight"	2010	Grafh	—N/a
"Look At Her (Killin’ Em Part 2)"	2011	Fabolous, Ne-Yo	The S.O.U.L. Tape
"Hello"	2011	Jasmine Villegas	S(HE) BE(LIE)VE(D)
"Waited Too Long"	2011	Consequence, The World Famous Tony Williams	—N/a
"Loco"	2012	Cory Gunz	—N/a
"Outstanding"	2012	Talib Kweli	Prisoner of Conscious
"Lay Down"	2013	Fabolous	The S.O.U.L. Tape 3

== Music videos ==
=== As main artist ===
List of music videos
Title	Year	Director(s)
"Diamond Girl"	2008	Chris Robinson
"Addiction" (featuring Fabolous & Cassie)	2008	Diane Martel
"How It Was Supposed to Be"	2009	Ryan Leslie, Tyson Beckford
"You're Not My Girl"	2009	Anthony Mandler
"Never gonna Break Up"	2010	Armen Djerrahian
"Glory"	2011	Ryan Leslie, Rob Winters
"Beautiful Lie"	2011	Ryan Leslie, Rob Winters
"Good Girl"	2011	Ryan Leslie, Rob Winters
"Early Than Late"	2012	Ryan Leslie, Rob Winters
"5 Minute Freshen Up"	2012	Ryan Leslie, Rob Winters
"Rain In Australia"	2012	Ryan Leslie, Rob Winters
"Dress You To Undress You"	2012	Ryan Leslie, Rob Winters
"Swiss Francs"	2012	Ryan Leslie, Rob Winters
"Maybachs & Diamonds"	2012	Ryan Leslie, Rob Winters
"Lovers & Mountains"	2013	Ryan Leslie, Rob Winters
"Carnival of Venice"	2013	Ryan Leslie, Rob Winters
"The Black Flag"	2013	Ryan Leslie, Rob Winters
"New New"	2014	Ryan Leslie, Rob Winters
"Designer Pain"	2015	Ryan Leslie, Rob Winters
"The Wonderful Ones"	2016	Ryan Leslie, Rob Winters

=== As featured artist ===
List of music videos
Title	Year	Director(s)
"Good Lovin'" (Slim featuring Fabolous & Ryan Leslie)	2008	Vashtie Kola
"Blow the Bank" / "Precious" (Jim Jones featuring Oshy, Starr & Ryan Leslie)	2009	CAPO
"So Forgetful" (Lloyd Banks featuring Ryan Leslie)	2011	Armen Djerrahian
"Fly Together" (Red Café featuring Rick Ross & Ryan Leslie)	2011	Colin Tilley

== Selected production credits ==
- "It Wuz U" by Anaya
- "Hold Tight by Latif featuring Sonny Carson
- "Hold Me Now" by Mia Rose
- "Hot Boy" by Mia Rose
- "Choose Us" by Nelson
- "Really Didn't Matter" by Nina Sky
- "Would U Love Me" By Uness
- "Be Next To Ya" by Krys Ivory
- "Choreographer" by Rhea featuring Jadakiss
- "Harlem Boy" by Lil Eddie
- "Stunt" by Game
