= American Psycho (disambiguation) =

American Psycho is a 1991 novel by Bret Easton Ellis.

American Psycho may also refer to:

== American Psycho franchise, related to the 1991 Ellis novel ==
- American Psycho (film), a 2000 dramatic thriller film based on the novel
  - American Psycho: Music from the Controversial Motion Picture, the 2000 soundtrack album to the film
  - American Psycho 2 (film), 2002 black comedy, franchise sequel film
- American Psycho (conceptual novel), a 2012 work by Jason Huff and Mimi Cabell based on Ellis's novel
- American Psycho (musical), a 2013 musical based on the novel
- Patrick Bateman, the psychotic main character from the novel and film and musical

== Other music ==
- American Psycho (album), by The Misfits, 1997
- American Psycho, a mixtape by Red Café, 2012
- American Psycho 2, a mixtape by Red Café, 2014

=== Songs ===
- "American Psycho" (song), by Treble Charger, 2000
- "American Psycho" (song), by The Misfits, 1997, off the album American Psycho (album)
- "American Psycho" (song), a song by D12 from Devil's Night, 2001
- "American Psycho" (Marshmello song), a non-album single, 2022
- "American Psycho II" (song), a song by D12 from D12 World, 2004

== Other uses ==
- Stephan Bonnar (born 1977), martial arts fighter nicknamed The American Psycho
- Ted Bundy: American Boogeyman, a 2021 crime film known in Canada as Ted Bundy: American Psycho.

== See also ==
- American Beauty/American Psycho (album), 2015 album by Fall Out Boy
- American Beauty/American Psycho Tour (concert tour), a 2015 concert tour by Fall Out Boy
- "American Beauty/American Psycho" (song), a 2014 song by Fall Out Boy off the eponymous album American Beauty/American Psycho
- American (disambiguation)
- Psycho (disambiguation)
- Patrick Bateman (disambiguation)
