= Red Café discography =

Artist discography

- EPs: 1
- Singles: 12
- Mixtapes: 11

American rapper Red Café has released one extended play (EP), eleven mixtapes and twelve singles.

== Albums ==
Once In A Red Moon (2026) [Prod. By Cartune Beats

=== Collaboration albums ===
List of extended plays, with selected chart positions
Title	Album details	Peak chart positions		
Title	Album details	US	US R&B	US Rap
The Co-op (with DJ Envy)	Released: September 25, 2007 (US); Label: Koch; Format: Digital download	—	—	—

=== EPs ===
List of extended plays, with selected chart positions and certifications
Title	Album details	Peak chart positions		
Title	Album details	US	US R&B	US Rap
In Us We Trust: The Compilation	Released: December 1, 2014; Label: Shakedown Entertainment; Format: Digital download	—	—	—

=== Mixtapes ===
List of mixtapes, with selected chart positions
Title	Album details	Peak chart positions
Title	Album details	US R&B
The Supplier (Hosted by DJ Whoo Kid)	Released: December 12, 2005 (US); Label: Howie McDuffie Music Group; Formats: CD, LP, digital download	88
Hennessy And Haze (Hosted by DJ Whoo Kid & Clinton Sparks)	Released: March 23, 2006; Label: Howie McDuffie Music Group; Formats: CD, digital download	—
The Arm & Hammer Man (Hosted by DJ Whoo Kid)	Released: January 16, 2007; Label: ShakeDown; Formats: CD, digital download	—
Eviction Notice (Hosted by DJ Envy)	Released: July 10, 2008; Label: ShakeDown, Konvict Muzik; Formats: CD, digital download	—
Hottest In The Hood (Hosted by Diddy)	Released: May 19, 2009; Label: ShakeDown, Konvict Muzik, Bad Boy; Formats: digital download	—
No Witnesses (Hosted by DJ Ill Will & DJ Rockstar)	Released: May 24, 2010; Label: ShakeDown, Konvict Muzik, Bad Boy; Formats: digital download	—
Above The Cloudz	Released: March 17, 2011; Label: ShakeDown, Bad Boy; Formats: LP, digital download	—
Hells Kitchen (Hosted by DJ Whoo Kid & DJ Ill Will)	Released: January 13, 2012; Label: ShakeDown, Bad Boy; Formats: digital download	—
American Psycho	Released: December 12, 2012; Label: ShakeDown, Bad Boy; Formats: digital download	—
American Psycho 2	Released: February 17, 2014; Label: ShakeDown, Street Family, Bad Boy; Formats: digital download	—
Dope God	Released: March 3, 2016; Label: ShakeDown, Street Family, Bad Boy; Formats: digital download	—
Less Talk More Hustle	Released: June 21, 2018; Label: ShakeDown, Street Family, Bad Boy; Formats: digital download	—

== Singles ==
List of singles, with selected chart positions, showing year released and album name
Title	Year	Peak chart positions			Album
Title	Year	US	US R&B	US Rap	Album
"Fly Together" (featuring Rick Ross and Ryan Leslie)	2011	—	44	22	Non-album singles
"Let It Go (Remix)" (featuring Diddy, 2 Chainz and French Montana)	2012	—	—	—	Non-album singles
"Pretty Gang" (featuring Fabolous)	2014	—	—	—	Non-album singles
"Making Me Proud" (featuring Jeremih and Rick Ross)	2015	—	—	—	Non-album singles
"She a Bad One (BBA) [Remix]" (featuring Cardi B)	2016	—	—	—	Non-album singles

=== Promotional singles ===
List of singles, with selected chart positions, showing year released and album name
Title	Year	Peak chart positions			Album
Title	Year	US	US R&B	US Rap	Album
"All Night Long"	2005	—	—	—	Coach Carter: Music from the Motion Picture
"Bling Blaow" (featuring Fabolous)	2005	—	67	—	The Supplier
"Diddy Bop"	2006	—	95	—	The Arm and Hammer Man
"Paper Touchin'" (featuring Fat Joe, Jadakiss and Fabolous)	2008	—	—	—	Eviction Notice
"Da Hottest in da Hood"	2009	—	77	—	Non-album single
"I'm Ill" (featuring Fabolous)	2010	—	74	—	Non-album singles
"Heart and Soul of New York" (featuring Pete Rock)	2010	—	—	—	Non-album singles
"Money Money Money" (featuring Diddy and Fabolous)	2010	—	68	—	Non-album singles
"Faded" (featuring Rick Ross)	2011	—	105	—	Above the Cloudz
"Above the Cloudz"	2011	—	—	—	Above the Cloudz
"We Get It On" (featuring Omarion)	2011	—	95	—	Above the Cloudz
"Let It Go (Dope Boy)" (featuring Diddy)	2012	—	76	—	Non-album single
"—" denotes a recording that did not chart.

=== Collaboration singles ===
List of singles, with selected chart positions, showing year released and album name
Title	Year	Peak chart positions			Album
Title	Year	US	US R&B	US Rap	Album
"Dolla Bill" (with DJ Envy featuring Fabolous)	2007	—	—	—	The Co-Op
"Things You Do" (with DJ Envy featuring Nina Sky)	2007	115	106	—	The Co-Op
"Doin In Da Club" (with DJ King SamS featuring Fabolous)	2008	—	—	—	Non-album single

=== Featured singles ===
Year	Song	Chart positions			Album
Year	Song	U.S.	U.S. R&B	U.S. Rap	Album
2008	"Big Balla" (Mack 10 feat. Glasses Malone & Red Café)	—	—	90	Soft White
2009	"Swagger" (Grandmaster Flash feat. Red Café, Snoop Dogg, MoU$e G & Lynn Carter)	—	—	—	The Bridge (Concept of a Culture)
2009	"Shootin" (Duo Live feat. Billionz, Joell Ortiz, Red Café, Uncle Murda & M.O.P.)	—	—	—	NBA 2K10 OST
2009	"Bigger Checks" (Beyond Belief feat. Red Café)	—	—	—	Bigger Checks (Maxi Single)
2012	"Function (Remix)" (E-40 feat Problem, Young Jeezy, Chris Brown, French Montana & Red Café)	—	—	—	

== Other charted songs ==
List of singles, with selected chart positions, showing year released and album name
Title	Year	Peak chart positions		Album
Title	Year	US	US R&B	Album
"Ocho Cinco" (French Montana featuring Machine Gun Kelly, Diddy, Red Cafe and Los)	2013	—	52	Mac & Cheese 3 and Excuse My French
"—" denotes a recording that did not chart or was not released in that territory.

== Guest appearances ==
List of non-single guest appearances, with other performing artists, showing year released and album name
Title	Year	Other artist(s)	Album
"I'm The Man"	2007	Fabolous	From Nothin' to Somethin'
"This Is Family"	2007	Fabolous, Paul Cain, Freck Billionaire, Joe Budden, Ransom	From Nothin' to Somethin'
"Set It Off" (Remix)	2007	N.O.R.E., Swizz Beatz, Cassidy, Busta Rhymes, Talib Kweli	—N/a
"Arab Money (Remix Pt. 2)"	2008	Busta Rhymes, Ron Browz, Rick Ross, Reek Da Villian, Spliff Star, N.O.R.E.	—N/a
"There He Go"	2009	Fabolous, Paul Cain, Freck Billionaire	Loso's Way
"I Feel Free"	2009	Nicki Minaj, Ron Browz, Ricky Blaze	Beam Me Up Scotty
"Thug Luv"	2010	DJ Kay Slay, Maino, Papoose, Ray J	More Than Just A DJ
"Night People"	2010	Masspike Miles, Freeway	Superfly
"Dope Boy Swag"	2010	Masspike Miles	Superfly
"Tonight"	2010	Fabolous	There Is No Competition 2: The Grieving Music EP
"This And That"	2010	Maino	The Art Of War
"Y'all Don't Hear Me Tho"	2011	Fabolous	The S.O.U.L. Tape
"Battle"	2011	Omarion	The Awakening
"Get It On"	2011	Omarion	The Awakening
"Self Made"	2011	DJ Drama, Yo Gotti	Third Power
"Unfuckwitable"	2011	Fabolous	There Is No Competition 3: Death Comes in 3's
"Sicker Than Yo Average"	2011	Fabolous, Trey Songz	Bedrock Boyz
"Round N Round"	2012	Torch, Masspike Miles, Pusha T	UFO
"Hab alles da"	2012	Haftbefehl	Kanackiş
"Function" (remix)	2012	Problem, E-40, Young Jeezy, Chris Brown, French Montana	Welcome To Mollywood 2
"Shake Dat"	2012	Verse Simmonds, Gucci Mane	Fuck Your Feelings
"Role Play"	2012	Bobby V	Dusk Till Dawn
"Ocho Cinco"	2012	French Montana, Diddy, MGK, Los	Mac & Cheese 3
"Whip Push"	2013	Kaboom, NH, Peedi Crakk, Gunplay	Our Way Vol. 3: Miami Heat Baller Blockin' Edition
"With The BS"	2013	Tech N9ne, Big Scoob, Trae tha Truth	Something Else
"MMM (Remix)"	2015	Cassidy, Fred Money, Vado, J.R. Writer, Papoose, Maino, Uncle Murda, Fat Trel, Fred the Godson, Chubby Jag, Drag-On, Dave East, Compton Menace	—N/a
"Peace Sign" (Original)	2015	Jeremih, Fabolous	—N/a
"Peace Sign"	2015	Rick Ross	Black Market
"Another One"	2019	E-40, Fabolous	Practice Makes Paper
"Dead Homies"	2019	The Game	Born 2 Rap
