= Addiction (Ryan Leslie song) =

Single by Ryan Leslie featuring Cassie and Fabolous

from the album Ryan Leslie
- Released: July 7, 2008
- Recorded: Chung King Studios; The Apartment (New York City)
- Genre: R&B; future soul
- Length: 4:00
- Label: NextSelection; Universal Motown
- Songwriters: Ryan Leslie; John Jackson; Stevie Wonder; Susaye Greene
- Producer: Ryan Leslie

Ryan Leslie singles chronology
"Diamond Girl" (2007)	"Addiction" (2008)	"How It Was Supposed to Be" (2008)

Cassie singles chronology
"Is It You" (2007)	"Addiction" (2008)	"Official Girl" (2008)

Fabolous singles chronology
"Hi Hater (Remix)" (2008)	"Addiction" (2008)	"I Can't Hear the Music" (2008)

"Addiction" is a song written, produced, and performed by American singer and record producer Ryan Leslie. It features vocals by American singer Cassie and American rapper Fabolous, who wrote his guest rap verse. The song contains elements from the composition "I Can't Help It" written by Stevie Wonder and Susaye Greene, as performed by Michael Jackson. Released as the second single from his self-titled debut album, Ryan Leslie (2009), it was sent to rhythmic and urban contemporary radio stations in the United States on July 7, 2008. The track was made available for digital download the following day through Universal Motown Records and Leslie's NextSelection imprint. A version of the song featuring just Cassie was also included in physical versions of the single.

The R&B-future soul song originated after a lively night out in New York City with Leslie having an impulse to go to the studio create a track that captured the "frenetic energy and electricity" he had experienced. He stated that music is his "addiction," but the track could be referring to a relationship or "anything that makes you feel that type of way." Commercially, the single failed to make an impact on the US Billboard Hot 100 but managed to appear at number fifteen on Billboard's Bubbling Under Hot 100 Singles and number thirty-five on the Hot R&B/Hip-Hop Songs charts as a partial result of steady airplay received from R&B/Hip-Hop format radio stations. It was remixed and sampled by multiple artists including Kid Cudi, Clipse, Wiz Khalifa and more.

"Addiction" was accompanied by two music videos, which both premiered in September 2008. The first was directed by Diane Martel and shot in black-and-white with a "simple and photographic" style. An alternate second video, co-directed by Leslie with Aaron Platt and John Monopoly, depicts the story of a "stalker super-fan." Cassie wasn't available to shoot the visuals due to scheduling conflicts, despite Leslie's original plans to make the song a duet with a respective video showing the chemistry between the two.

== Background ==
While working as a record producer, Leslie co-founded NextSelection Lifestyle Group with marketing partner Rasheed Richmond. Leslie signed his first artist, Cassie, in 2005. She recorded a series of demo recordings, including "Me & U," which was released as her debut single soon after going viral on MySpace. "Me & U" went on to peak in the Top 10 of several countries, including number 3 on the US Billboard Hot 100, spending seven weeks atop the US Airplay chart and earned a Platinum certification by the Recording Industry Association of America for sales of over one million digital downloads. Leslie then wrote and produced her entire debut album Cassie, released the following year, as Leslie helped Cassie become the first artist to break on a large scale after being discovered by fans on a social networking website like MySpace, resulting in Yahoo! calling her "the first Internet pop star." Meanwhile, Leslie claimed he was "always working on an album of my own. Just doing everything organically," as he regularly shared new tracks online. He released the lead single of his US debut studio album in January 2008, "Diamond Girl."

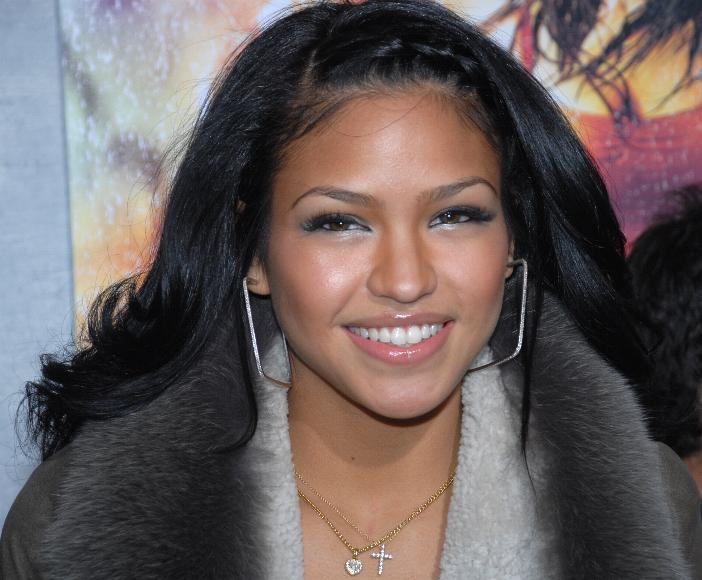
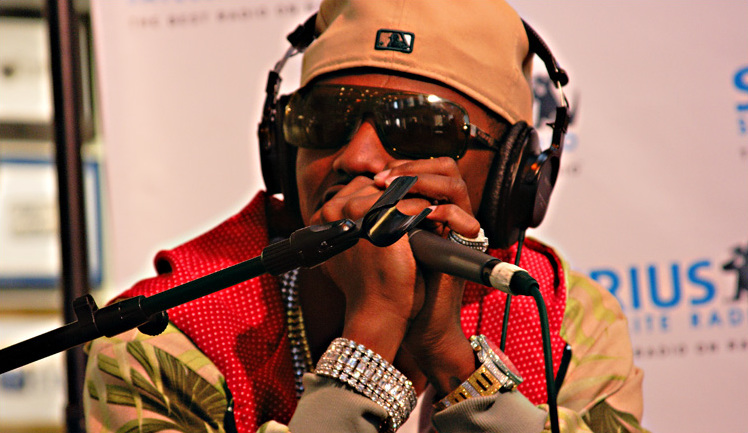
Cassie is featured singing the hook on "Addiction," and Fabolous contributed with a rap verse for the single release.

In April 2008, Leslie posted a new song on his MySpace page titled "Addiction," featuring Cassie singing the hook, "I'm addicted to you/ You're my addiction," as well as an in-studio video while he was making it. A new verse and additional ad-libs by Leslie's frequent collaborator, rapper Fabolous, were added to the track; the feature was announced the following month and included for the official single release. An alternate version of the song featuring Keri Hilson instead of Cassie also surfaced online. The single was serviced to rhythmic and urban contemporary radio stations in the United States on July 7, 2008, before being digitally released the following day. A promotional CD single and 12-inch vinyl were also released on August 19, 2008.

== Composition ==
"Addiction" is an R&B song, with a length of four minutes. A writer for The Fader described it as "over eccentric and breezy future-soul," while Billboard characterized it as a track where "Leslie isn't too macho to admit he's sprung over a girl." It contains elements of "I Can't Help It" written by Stevie Wonder and Susaye Greene, as performed by Michael Jackson. Leslie explained how its creation was related to the lyrical content saying that the song "came about one night after I'd gone to several different spots in New York City. One night after doing that, that energy and excitement was in me, and instead of going home, I went straight to the studio," continuing, "I don't drink or smoke, so the way that I creatively express myself is to get right in the studio. I wanted to create a track that captured that frenetic energy and electricity that I had experienced that night." He said that "Addiction" is about anything that makes you feel that type of way, concluding, "And it could be a relationship, but for me it's music."

== Commercial performance ==
"Addiction" charted at number 15 on the US Billboard Bubbling Under Hot 100 Singles for the week of August 23, 2008. The single debuted on the Billboard Bubbling Under R&B/Hip-Hop Singles at number 15, reaching number 35 on the main Hot R&B/Hip-Hop Songs chart. Additionally, it peaked at number 35 on the Hot R&B/Hip-Hop Airplay and 39 on the Mainstream R&B/Hip-Hop charts. It also appeared on the Deutsche Black Charts peaking at number 13, having spent ten weeks on the chart.

== Remixes and other use ==
The song received a number of reinterpretations by various artists such as Kid Cudi, who freestyled over the song in "London Girls." Hip hop duo Clipse released a remix of the track in December 2008, included on their mixtape Road to Till the Casket Drops. Baas B and Brace covered the song on "Stalker." It was sampled by Olivia on her 2011 single "December."

Lunice and Altered Natives released their reworked versions in December 2010, as a part of Skydiver, a Cassie tribute remix compilation album by independent British label Local Action. Producer Phazz uploaded his remix online in 2013 and Iman Omari posted his adaptation in 2014, with Noisey writing that "he flips Ryan Leslie and Cassie's classic into a red-eyed slumber party where the snacks and conversation never run dry."

== Music videos ==
Two music videos were shot for the song; the first was filmed on July 23, 2008, in a Chelsea studio, and directed by Diane Martel. It premiered on Yahoo! Music on September 8, 2008. The entirely-grayscale video shows Leslie performing the track after a small Sony television is turned on by a feminine hand covered by a bed sheet. Jamaican models Jeneil Williams and Gaye McDonald dance and lip sync to Cassie's parts throughout the clip. Leslie then appears on a bigger projection screen as the models move in front of it. George Michael's "Freedom! '90" music video served as inspiration. Leslie talked about the video stating: "one look and you'll notice I'm not wearing a tuxedo or even a suit in the clip. Director Diane Martel assured me that this one should be all about the beauty of simplicity." He considered it to be a statement "about the need for more diversity in the fashion business."

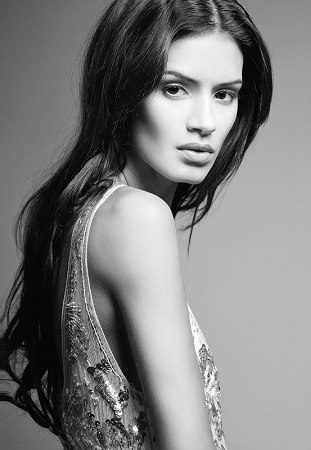
Model Jaslene Gonzalez plays Leslie's love interest in the second music video.

An alternate video directed by Aaron Platt, John Monopoly and Leslie was released later that month. It shows Leslie spending a day with his love interest, played by America's Next Top Model Cycle 8 winner Jaslene Gonzalez, as they're followed by another woman, played by Jeannena Flores from his previous "Diamond Girl" movie. The video ends after the woman poisons Leslie's date at a nightclub (who passes out in his arms) after sending him a text message that reads: "we will be together." American record producer Swizz Beatz makes a cameo appearance with Fabolous during his verse. Shots of Leslie Leslie singing in a recording studio and playing piano are shown throughout the clip. Leslie said the video represented a different "imaginative, creative" side of him and expressed the concept was based on a "tale of a stalker super-fan come to life. [...] This video finds me in studio, shopping with my girl, and catching her as she falls – swooning unconsciously from my stalker's poisoned libation." He explained Cassie's absence was due to her "hectic schedule" recording her new album, pointing out he initially had a vision for the song to be a duet between the two and have a video that showed their chemistry together. Despite Cassie not making an appearance in neither of the visuals, Fabolous has guest spots in both videos performing his rap verse.

== Track listing ==
- Digital download
1. "Addiction" (featuring Cassie and Fabolous) – 4:00
- 12-inch vinyl
1. "Addiction" (featuring Cassie and Fabolous) (Main) – 3:59
2. "Addiction" (featuring Cassie) (Main) – 4:02
3. "Addiction" (Instrumental) – 3:59
4. "Addiction" (Acapella) – 3:55
- CD single
1. "Addiction" (featuring Cassie and Fabolous) (Main) – 3:59
2. "Addiction" (featuring Cassie) (Main) – 4:02
3. "Addiction" (Instrumental) – 3:59
4. "Addiction" (Call Out Hook) – 0:19

== Credits and personnel ==
Credits adapted from the liner notes of Addiction and Ryan Leslie.

Locations

- Recorded at Chung King Studios and The Apartment, New York City
- Mixed at Bennett Studios, Englewood
- Mastered at Sterling Sound, New York City

Personnel

- Ryan Leslie – vocals, composer, primary artist, producer, background vocals, instruments, engineer, programming
- Cassie – vocals, featured artist
- Fabolous – vocals, featured artist, composer
- Stevie Wonder – composer
- Susaye Greene-Brown – composer
- Rich Keller – mixing
- Chris Athens – mastering
- Anthony Palazzole – assistant engineer

== Charts ==
Chart (2008)	Peak position
Germany (Deutsche Black Charts)	13
US Bubbling Under Hot 100 Singles (Billboard)	15
US Hot R&B/Hip-Hop Songs (Billboard)	35
US Hot R&B/Hip-Hop Airplay (Billboard)	35
US Mainstream R&B/Hip-Hop (Billboard)	39

== Release history ==
Country	Date	Format	Label
United States	July 7, 2008	Rhythmic contemporary	NextSelection; Universal Motown
United States	July 7, 2008	Urban contemporary	NextSelection; Universal Motown
United States	July 8, 2008	Digital download	NextSelection; Universal Motown
United States	August 19, 2008	Vinyl	NextSelection; Universal Motown
United States	August 19, 2008	CD single	NextSelection; Universal Motown
