= Patrick Bateman (disambiguation) =

Patrick Bateman is a character from the book American Psycho. Patrick Bateman may also refer to

- "Patrick Bateman", a 1992 song by Manic Street Preachers
- "Patrick Bateman", a song by Local H from Lifers
- Patrick Bateman, a 2004 ep by Krieg

== See also ==
•Patrick Bateson, an English biologist

• American Psycho (disambiguation)
