= So Fly =

Single by Slim featuring Yung Joc

from the album Love's Crazy
- Released: June 10, 2008
- Recorded: 2007–08
- Genre: R&B
- Length: 3:36
- Label: M3 Productions/Asylum
- Songwriter(s): Marvin Scandrick, Justin Harris, Nick Lazzeri, Jasiel Amon Robinson
- Producer(s): Oddz.N.Endz

Slim singles chronology
"So Fly" (2008)	"Good Lovin'" (2008)

Yung Joc singles chronology
"Lookin Boy" (2008)	"So Fly" (2008)	"Beep" (2008)

Shawty Lo singles chronology
"Foolish (Remix)" (2008)	"So Fly" (2008)	"Break Ya Ankles" (2008)

"So Fly" is the debut single of 112 group member Slim from his debut album Love's Crazy. It features rapper Yung Joc and produced by Oddz N Endz. The song reached No. 49 on the U.S. Billboard Hot 100.

== Track listing ==
Digital download

1. "So Fly" - 3:36 (feat. Yung Joc)

== Remixes ==
On October 27, 2008, the main official remix was released and features new verses and vocals by Slim and new verses by R&B singer Faith Evans and Atlanta rapper Big Boi.

The single/video version that features Shawty Lo is the second main official remix.

Another remix called the "East Coast Remix" featuring Jadakiss, Busta Rhymes and Freeway was also released in 2008.

== Charts ==
=== Weekly charts ===
Chart (2008)	Peak position
US Billboard Hot 100	49
US Hot R&B/Hip-Hop Songs (Billboard)	8
US Hot Rap Songs (Billboard)	18
US Rhythmic (Billboard)	14

=== Year-end charts ===
Chart (2008)	Position
US Hot R&B/Hip-Hop Songs (Billboard)	60
