= Long Way 2 Go =

2006 single by Cassie

- Digital cover

Single by Cassie

from the album Cassie
- B-side: "Can't Do It Without You"; "When Your Body Is Talking"
- Released: August 28, 2006
- Genre: Hip-hop; R&B
- Length: 3:40
- Label: NextSelection; Bad Boy; Atlantic
- Songwriters: Casandra Ventura; Ryan Leslie
- Producer: Ryan Leslie

Cassie singles chronology
"Me & U" (2006)	"Long Way 2 Go" (2006)	"Is It You" (2007)

Alternative cover
- Physical cover

"Long Way 2 Go" is a song by American singer Cassie from her self-titled debut studio album (2006). It was co-written by Cassie herself alongside the song's producer, Ryan Leslie. The song was released as the second and final single from the album by Bad Boy Records on August 28, 2006. Musically, "Long Way 2 Go" is an upbeat hip hop song which contains prominent R&B characteristics with a laid-back and imperious theme. Lyrically, it discusses brushing off a would-be suitor like dirt off one's shoulder. Additional vocals are provided by Leslie, who provides a call-and-response dichotomy with Cassie.

"Long Way 2 Go" received positive reviews from contemporary critics who deemed it a stand-out on the album. It was also praised for its cool and playful nature. The single became Cassie's second consecutive top twenty hit in Ireland, New Zealand and the United Kingdom. It also garnered further chart success in Australia, France and Sweden where it peaked within the top thirty. On the Billboard Hot 100, the single reached a peak of ninety-seven only, due to limited radio play.

The music video accompanying "Long Way 2 Go" was directed by Erik White. It premiered on MTV's Total Request Live on September 12, 2006. The video has a social networking theme to it and features Ryan Leslie playing the role of Cassie's would-be lover. Cassie performed the song on French TV show Hit Machine (2007) and has regularly included it in the setlist of her live shows.

== Background and composition ==
Cassie was spotted frequently in late 2002 at clubs and parties by music producer Ryan Leslie. The two worked together and wrote a duet called "Kiss Me", and after recording the track, Leslie played the song for music executive Tommy Mottola. After hearing "Kiss Me" Mottola offered Cassie a management deal, and Leslie also signed her to NextSelection Lifestyle Group, his music-media company he founded with online marketing partner Rasheed Richmond. Leslie wrote and produced Cassie's first single, "Me & U", in 2005. The song became a successful club song in Germany. During this time, Diddy heard "Me & U", and Leslie convinced him to partner his Bad Boy Records with Leslie's NextSelection imprint for the release of Cassie's debut album. In different fashion to previous single "Me & U", Cassie raps on "Long Way 2 Go". Speaking to MTV News, she explained what the song was about: "The song is about a guy who's trying to get with me but he's got a long way to go."

The song is performed in the key of C minor with a tempo of 105 beats per minute.

== Critical reception ==
Sal Cinquemani of Slant Magazine positively reviewed "Long Way 2 Go", deeming it a "sassy smash-in-the-make that should prove popular with fans of Nelly Furtado's 'Promiscuous'." Cinquemani went on to praise Cassie's rapping in the song's verses, saying: "Cassie raps the verses in a nonchalant, dispassionate tone, as if she's dismissing the advances of a poor boy while simultaneously blowing on freshly painted fingernails". The Slant Magazine reviewer mentioned the lines "I love it when they try to get intimate/Even though they know I really ain't into it" as a highlight. AllMusic's Andy Kellman said that "the snapping and swirling 'Long Way 2 Go' is just as irresistible in its flippant playfulness [as 'Me & U']." Kellman elaborated: "Cassie scolds a hopeless suitor with such cutting nonchalance -- she's basically swatting a fly-- that you can see her delivering the lines by cellphone as she eyes a display of designer shoes." Doriah Lynskey from Blender said that "Long Way 2 Go" is as coolly imperious as "Me & U". Lynskey positively described its lyrical conception saying that in the song Cassie is "brushing away a would-be lover like dirt off her shoulder." While Daily Mirror reviewed the track saying it shows that Cassie is no one-trick pony, further describing the song as "blending cute and clever mating rituals".

== Chart performance ==
In Ireland, "Long Way 2 Go" debuted at number forty-nine on October 19, 2006. The single went on to peak at number fourteen and spend a total of ten weeks on the chart. Also on October 19, the single peaked and debuted at number twenty-eight in Sweden. "Long Way 2 Go" also achieved chart success in mainland Europe where it peaked at number forty-three in Germany and number forty-seven on European Hot 100 Singles. In France, despite peaking at a lower position (number twenty-one) than "Me & U" (number eight), "Long Way 2 Go" had a significantly longer charting length than it, spending a total of twenty-two weeks on the chart.

On October 22, 2006 "Long Way 2 Go" debuted at number thirty-eight on the UK Singles Chart. The single's chart debut brought about Cassie holding the record of being the only artist to have two singles in the top forty (the other being "Me & U" which was at number thirty-one that week) in the same week for week forty-three of 2006. The following week, "Long Way 2 Go" climbed twenty-six places to number twelve becoming the second greatest gainer for week forty-four of 2006 on the chart. The single peaked at twelve and spent a total of twelve weeks on the chart. It subsequently became Cassie's second top twenty hit and second most successful single to-date in the United Kingdom behind "Me & U".

On December 18, 2006 "Long Way 2 Go" debuted at number eighteen in New Zealand as the third highest new entry for the week. In its fifth week on the chart the single held the record for the greatest gainer of the week; climbing seventeen places from thirty-four to peak at number seventeen. In Australia, the single debuted at number twenty-four before peaking at number twenty-three for two consecutive weeks.

In the United States, "Long Way 2 Go" had minor chart success due to limited radio play. It spent two weeks on the Billboard Hot 100, peaking at number ninety-seven. It also peaked at number eighty-six on Billboard Pop 100 and at number twenty-nine on Billboard Rhythmic Top 40.

== Music video ==
Cassie lying on a bed beside a red laptop in the social networking-themed music video for "Long Way 2 Go".

On July 17, 2006, Cassie told MTV News about her preparing a music video for "Long Way 2 Go". She said: "We're probably doing the video in the next two or three weeks, so look out for it." It was filmed on August 17, 2006 with American music video director, Erik White. White's previous work includes "Leave (Get Out)" for American pop and R&B singer JoJo, and Chris Brown's "Run It!"

The video premiered worldwide on MTV's Total Request Live on September 12, 2006 and stayed on the countdown for 13 days. Baby G, a member of Brooklyn rock band Shinobi Ninja appeared in the video.

== Formats and track listing ==
- US 12"
1. "Long Way 2 Go" – 3:40
2. "Me & U" (remix) (featuring Diddy and Yung Joc) – 4:47
3. "Me & U" (Ryan Leslie Remix) – 3:14
4. "Long Way 2 Go" (instrumental) – 3:40
- EU digital EP
1. "Long Way 2 Go" – 3:40
2. "Long Way 2 Go" (instrumental) – 3:40
3. "Long Way 2 Go" (a cappella) – 3:10
4. "Can't Do It Without You" – 3:55
- EU CD single
1. "Long Way 2 Go" – 3:40
2. "Long Way 2 Go" (instrumental) – 3:40
- AUS / CAN / NZ digital EP
1. "Long Way 2 Go" – 3:40
2. "When Your Body Is Talking" – 3:43
3. "Can't Do It Without You" – 3:55
- UK CD1
1. "Long Way 2 Go" – 3:40
2. "Long Way 2 Go" (instrumental) – 3:40
3. "Long Way 2 Go" (a cappella) – 3:10
4. "When Your Body Is Talking" – 3:43
5. "Can't Do It Without You" – 3:55
6. "Long Way 2 Go" (music video) – 3:40
- UK CD2 / FRA CD single
1. "Long Way 2 Go" – 3:40
2. "When Your Body Is Talking" – 3:43
- GER CD single
1. "Long Way 2 Go" – 3:40
2. "When Your Body Is Talking" – 3:43
3. "Can't Do It Without You" – 3:55
4. "Long Way 2 Go" (music video) – 3:40

== Credits and personnel ==
- Cassie – songwriting, vocals
- Ryan Leslie – songwriting, additional vocals, record production, mixing, instrumentation, recording, programming, arranging

== Charts ==
=== Weekly charts ===
Chart (2006–2007)	Peak position
Australia (ARIA)	23
Australian Urban (ARIA)	8
European Hot 100 Singles (Billboard)	47
France (SNEP)	21
Germany (GfK)	43
Germany (Deutsche Black Charts)	12
Ireland (IRMA)	14
New Zealand (Recorded Music NZ)	17
Scottish Singles Sales (Official Charts)	21
Sweden (Sverigetopplistan)	28
UK Singles (Official Charts)	12
UK Hip Hop/R&B (Official Charts)	3
US Billboard Hot 100	97
US Bubbling Under R&B/Hip-Hop Songs (Billboard)	15
US Pop 100 (Billboard)	86
US Rhythmic Airplay (Billboard)	29

=== Year-end charts ===
Chart (2006)	Position
Germany (Deutsche Black Charts)	111
UK Singles (OCC)	148
Chart (2007)	Position
Australian Urban (ARIA)	47

== Certifications ==
Region	Certification	Certified units/sales
Denmark (IFPI Danmark)	Gold	45,000^{‡}
New Zealand (RMNZ)	2× Platinum	60,000^{‡}
United Kingdom (BPI)	Platinum	600,000^{‡}
^{‡} Sales+streaming figures based on certification alone.

== Release history ==
Region	Date	Format	Catalog	Ref.
United States	August 28, 2006	Rhythmic contemporary radio	—N/a	
United States	October 2, 2006	Contemporary hit radio	—N/a	
United Kingdom	October 23, 2006	Digital EP	201228335	
United Kingdom	October 23, 2006	CD single	0075679446428	
Sweden	October 23, 2006	Digital EP	201228335	
Netherlands	October 23, 2006	Digital EP	201228335	
Norway	October 23, 2006	Digital EP	201228335	
Switzerland	October 23, 2006	Digital EP	201228335	
Belgium	October 23, 2006	Digital EP	201228335	
Australia	January 27, 2007	Digital EP	212031232	
New Zealand	January 27, 2007	Digital EP	212031237	
Germany	February 1, 2007	CD single	0075679446657	
France	August 21, 2007	CD single	0075679446459	
