= Direct text marketing =

Form of SMS marketing

Direct text marketing is a form of SMS marketing. This includes using a medium which involves text messaging over a mobile device and can be done from a mobile phone or in bulk using an SMS Aggregator and distributor online. Some businesses provide the entire service including creating the messages and sending them via an aggregator on behalf of a business. Today, direct text marketing has been subsumed under mobile marketing, which includes rich media embedded into the marketing messages as well as those messages sent via mobile applications besides SMS.

== Advantages ==
Companies and businesses can benefit from using this form of modern marketing by sending either promotional content, reminders, event announcements, discount coupons or any other informational content via text format directly to individuals via their personal mobile phones or PDAs, which is beneficial because of the relatively low cost entailed. Some observers have commented that it allows companies to reduce their impact on the environment because they are no longer using paper for their direct mails. The fundamental value is that the target audience is often compelled to open the text messages that arrive in their inbox. In a study in the United Kingdom, 81 percent opened and read text messages sent for the purpose of direct marketing. There are numerous possibilities for direct text marketing, including customer services, alerts, CRM, communication via a two-way direct response mechanism, brand bonding, and event ticketing.

== Disadvantages ==
Mobile phones and PDAs are personal technologies, but "57% of adults with cell phones have received unwanted or spam text messages on their phones". Services of sending promotional or coupon discounts are usually an opt-in service, which means a business cannot send any content to an individual's mobile device unless requested by the owner of the mobile device. Nevertheless, interference is still considered as a disadvantage, particularly with respect to the impact of timeliness, relevance, and appropriateness of the messages in addition to information overload.

In Australia, receivers of text messages for promotional purposes must opt-in.
