= Slim (singer) =

American singer

- Born: Marvin Scandrick; September 25, 1974 (age 51)
- Origin: Atlanta, Georgia, U.S.
- Genres: R&B; neo soul
- Occupation: Musician
- Instruments: Vocals; piano
- Years active: 1991-present
- Labels: Asylum; Shanachie Records; Bad Boy
- Member of: 112

Marvin Scandrick (born September 25, 1974), known professionally as Slim, is an American contemporary R&B singer best known as the lead singer/frontman for the group 112. His 2008 debut album Love's Crazy peaked at No. 32 on the Billboard 200. It included the hit singles "So Fly", which reached No. 49 on the Billboard Hot 100, and "Good Lovin'", which reached No. 39 on the Hot R&B/Hip-Hop Songs chart.

== Discography ==
=== Albums ===
- Love's Crazy (2008)
- Re-Fueled (2016)

=== Singles ===
Year	Song	Chart positions			Album
Year	Song	U.S. Hot 100	U.S. R&B	U.S. Pop 100	Album
2008	"So Fly" (featuring Shawty Lo & Yung Joc)	49	5	75	Love's Crazy
2008	"Good Lovin'" (featuring Ryan Leslie & Fabolous)	—	39	—	Love's Crazy
2015	"Killin' Em Girl"	—	—	—	Re-Fueled
2016	"Never Break Up" (featuring Rich Homie Quan)	—	—	—	Re-Fueled
