= Red Café =

Guyanese-American rapper

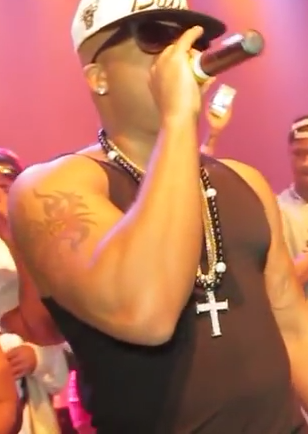
- Red Café performing in 2012

Background information
- Also known as: Arm & Hammer Man
- Born: Jermaine Alfred Denny; September 19, 1976 (age 49); Guyana
- Origin: Brooklyn, New York City, U.S.
- Genres: East Coast hip-hop, gangsta rap
- Works: Red Café discography
- Years active: 1999–present
- Labels: ShakeDown; Bad Boy; Street Family; Interscope; Hoo-Bangin'; Desert Storm; Konvict; Universal Motown; Capitol; Arista; Trackmasters
- Formerly of: Da Franchise
- Website: redcafe.tv

Jermaine Alfred Denny, (born September 19, 1976), known professionally as Red Café, is a Guyanese-American rapper. He formed the short-lived hip hop group Da Franchise in the late 1990s, who signed with the company Violator and saw local success before his departure in 2001. As a solo act, he signed three ineffective recording contracts with Trackmasters Entertainment, an imprint of Arista Records, Mack 10's Hoo-Bangin' Records, an imprint of Capitol Records, and Motown due to label disputes, company fallouts, and creative differences throughout the 2000s.

During this time, he amassed a number of underground mixtapes and singles that were met with regional praise. His debut album, The Co-Op (2007) was released independently as a collaborative project with DJ Envy. He signed with Fabolous' Street Family Records by 2007, and gained further recognition for his 2010 single "I'm Ill" (featuring Fabolous). He then signed with Akon's Konvict Muzik and Puff Daddy's Bad Boy Records through a triple-joint venture with Interscope Records to release his 2011 commercial single, "Fly Together" (featuring Rick Ross and Ryan Leslie). Intended to lead his major label debut album ShakeDown, the song and its follow-up singles failed to enter mainstream charts and led to the album's cancellation; he quietly parted ways with the labels shortly after.

== Personal life ==
Red Café is an East Coast rapper, and has been closely identified with Brooklyn, New York City throughout his career. His nickname "Red" was his father's nickname; "Red Café" is what was stamped on bags of his drug merchandise. Café stated that he was born in Guyana, but he and his family moved to Brooklyn at the age of six.

He was imprisoned for four years starting in 1992.

== Career ==
After his release from jail, he joined the group Da Franchise, which consisted of Gravy and Q Da Kid and were signed by Violator Records. The group released the 2000 single "We Gotta Eat". Seeing further promise in his solo work, Café parted ways with the group shortly after. He was signed by Arista in 2003, Capitol (Hoo-Bangin' Records) in 2005, Universal (Konvict Muzik) in 2006, and Interscope (Konvict Muzik) in 2007, but failed to release a major studio album with each. His song "All Night Long" was included on the 2005 soundtrack to the film Coach Carter. As an underground rapper, his work is not internationally recognized, though he has been rapping on the circuit since the late 1990s.

He released an album with DJ Envy, The Co-Op, in 2007. Remy Ma was featured on the album. Red Cafe made an original song, "Stick'm" for the video game Grand Theft Auto IV.

On March 17, 2011, Café released his retail mixtape, Above the Cloudz. On January 13, 2012, Café released his mixtape Hell's Kitchen. On December 12, 2012, Café released his mixtape American Psycho. American Psycho has featurings coming from French Montana, Chief Keef, Fabolous, Jeremih, T-Pain, Trey Songz, The Game, and 2 Chainz, with production from Young Chop, Reefa, Soundsmith Productions, and others.

On February 17, 2014, Café released his mixtape American Psycho 2. On July 29, 2014, Café released his latest single entitled "Pretty Gang" featuring frequent collaborator and close friend Fabolous.

=== Acting ===
In 2009, Café played Primo, the freestyle battle rapper, in the 2009 Biggie Smalls biopic Notorious. The film starred fellow Da Franchise member Gravy who portrayed Smalls. In 2011, he performed at the debut television event of the Urban Wrestling Federation, though the show was never released. Red Cafe co-wrote and performed uncredited guest vocals on Rick Ross' song "Peace Sign", from Ross' eighth studio album Black Market (2015).

== Discography ==
Collaborative albums

- The Co-Op (with DJ Envy)
