= Love's Crazy =

Studio album by Slim
- Released: November 18, 2008
- Recorded: 2007–08
- Genre: Contemporary R&B
- Labels: M3; Asylum
- Producers: Slim (exec.); Midnight Black (also co-exec.); Derek "DOA" Allen; Kuya Productions; Oddz N Endz; Ryan Leslie; Rockyard for Couture Music; DJ Baby Yu; Jeremy Manongdo

Slim chronology
Love's Crazy (2008)	Refueled (2016)

Singles from Love's Crazy
- 1. "So Fly" Released: June 10, 2008; 2. "Good Lovin'" Released: November 2008

Love's Crazy is the debut solo studio album by American singer Slim. It was released on November 18, 2008 through M3 Productions with distribution via Asylum Records. Production was handled by Midnight Black, Derek "DOA" Allen, Kuya Productions, Oddz N Endz, Ryan Leslie, Rockyard for Couture Music, Jeremy Manongdo and DJ Baby Yu. It features guest appearances from Big Boi, Deezo, Fabolous, Faith Evans, Ryan Leslie, Yung Berg and Yung Joc. In the United States, the album debuted at number 32 on the Billboard 200 and number 4 on the Top R&B/Hip-Hop Albums, selling 27,000 units in its first week.

Its lead single, "So Fly", peaked at number 49 on the Billboard Hot 100. The second single of the album, "Good Lovin'", made it to No. 39 on both the Hot R&B/Hip-Hop Songs and R&B/Hip-Hop Airplay.

== Critical reception ==
Professional ratings
Review scores
Source	Rating
Artistdirect	3/5 stars

Amy Sciarretto from Artistdirect described Love's Crazy as "slicker than a wet floor" and praised its "sensitive soulfulness," noting that its polished R&B slow jams appeal to women without becoming vulgar. She concluded that the album is "truly a sexy record" that "maintain[s] its cool exterior and allure."

== Track listing ==
No.	Title	Writer(s)	Producer(s)	Length
1.	"Intro"	Marvin Scandrick; Derek Allen	Derek "DOA" Allen	1:19
2.	"She Got That"	Scandrick; Angelica Faye Tucker; Tracey Demont Sewell; Phillip Williams; Vasco Ladell Whiteside; Delano Horn	Midnight Black	4:24
3.	"Good Lovin'" (featuring Fabolous and Ryan Leslie)	Ryan Leslie; John David Jackson	Ryan Leslie	4:21
4.	"So Fly" (featuring Yung Joc)	Scandrick; Jasiel Robinson; Justin Harris; Nicholas Lazzeri	Oddz N Endz	3:32
5.	"Baby Yu (Interlude)"	Scandrick; Daniel Nakayama	DJ Baby Yu	0:48
6.	"So Gone" (featuring Faith Evans)	Scandrick; Faith Renee Evans; Williams; Sewell; Whiteside; Cedric Barnett; Rufus Moore	Midnight Black	5:15
7.	"Sweet Baby"	Scandrick; Allen; Salime Asid; T Roc	Derek "DOA" Allen; Salime Asid (co.)	4:29
8.	"Heels On" (featuring Yung Berg and Deezo)	Scandrick; Christian Ward; Donzelle Tate; Sewell; Tucker; Williams; Wendell T. Fite; Horn	Midnight Black	4:51
9.	"Bedtime Stories"	Scandrick; Allen; Rogenive Mamauag	Derek "DOA" Allen	4:49
10.	"U Got Me (Addicted)"	Scandrick; Sewell; Williams; Whiteside; Barnett; Horn	Midnight Black	5:13
11.	"Don't Say It"	Scandrick; Sewell; Williams; Whiteside; Barnett	Midnight Black	3:34
12.	"Leave U Alone"	Scandrick; Talia Coles; Sherman Tisdale	Rockyard For Couture Music	4:15
13.	"More (Interlude)"	Scandrick	Jeremy Manongdo	1:19
14.	"Apologize"	Attozio Dishawn Towns; Robert Gerongco; Samuel Gerongco	Kuya Productions	4:19
15.	"Love's Crazy" (featuring Big Boi)	Scandrick; Antwan Patton; Sewell; Williams; Whiteside; Horn; Cameron Smith	Midnight Black	3:43

Bonus tracks
No.	Title	Writer(s)	Length
16.	"Pretty Kitty"	Scandrick; Coles; Tisdale; Victan Paul Edmund	4:43
17.	"So Fly (R & B Version)"	Scandrick; Mario W. Blair	3:33
18.	"The Way That It Is" (featuring 8Ball)		3:55

iTunes bonus tracks
No.	Title	Writer(s)	Producer(s)	Length
16.	"Anything"	Scandrick; Sewell; Whiteside	Midnight Black	4:53
17.	"Girl Like You"	Allen	Derek "DOA" Allen; Warrington "Warr Rich" Richardson (add.)	3:38

== Charts ==
=== Weekly charts ===
Chart (2008)	Peak position
US Billboard 200	32
US Top R&B/Hip-Hop Albums (Billboard)	4

=== Year-end charts ===
Chart (2009)	Position
US Top R&B/Hip-Hop Albums (Billboard)	81
