= Good Lovin' (Slim song) =

Single by Slim featuring Fabolous and Ryan Leslie

from the album Love's Crazy
- Released: November 2008
- Genre: R&B
- Length: 4:25
- Label: M3 Productions, Asylum
- Songwriters: Anthony Ryan Leslie; John David Jackson
- Producer: Ryan Leslie

Slim singles chronology
"So Fly" (2008)	"Good Lovin'" (2008)	"Heels On" (2008)

Ryan Leslie singles chronology
"How It Was Supposed to Be" (2008)	"Good Lovin'" (2008)	"You're Not My Girl" (2009)

Fabolous singles chronology
"I Can't Hear the Music" (2008)	"Good Lovin'" (2008)	"She Got Her Own" (2008)

Music video
- Good Lovin' on YouTube

"Good Lovin'" is a song by American R&B singer Slim, released by M3 Productions and Asylum Records in November 2008 as the second single from his debut album, Love's Crazy (2007). The song features vocals from American rapper Fabolous and American singer Ryan Leslie, the latter of whom also wrote the song (excluding Fabolous's verse) and handled its production.

== Music video ==
The music video, filmed in New York City, was directed by Vashtie Kola. On November 19, 2008 a behind-the-scenes video was released where Slim described the video as "a 1930s, 1940s style". The video was released on November 20, 2008.

== Other versions ==
American singer-songwriter Ciara, recorded her own rendition of the song to promote her then-upcoming album Fantasy Ride (2009). The rendition features vocals from American rapper 50 Cent and the song was re-titled "Slow Down".

== Charts ==
Chart (2009)	Peak position
U.S. Billboard Hot R&B/Hip-Hop Songs	39
