= Me & U (Cassie song) =

2006 single by Cassie

- Original CD single cover

Single by Cassie

from the album Cassie
- Released: April 25, 2006
- Genre: Electro-R&B
- Length: 3:11
- Label: NextSelection; Bad Boy; Atlantic
- Songwriter: Ryan Leslie
- Producer: Ryan Leslie

Cassie singles chronology
"Me & U" (2006)	"Long Way 2 Go" (2006)

Alternative cover
- Digital and promotional cover

Music video
- "Me & U" on YouTube

"Me & U" is a song by American singer Cassie. It was released on April 25, 2006, as her debut single and as the lead single from her self-titled debut album (2006). Written and produced by Ryan Leslie, the song reached number three on the Billboard Hot 100 and remained in the chart's top 40 for nearly five months.

The song's "Bad Boy" remix features Diddy and Yung Joc and the song's "The Inc" remix features Ja Rule and Harry-O. The single became a top-three single in the United States, a top-five single in New Zealand, and a top-10 hit in France, Ireland, and the United Kingdom. The song was considered "a slinky, vintage-sounding track with a hypnotic, snake-charming whistle," and likened to imitating Janet Jackson. The song is performed in the key of G♯ minor with a tempo of 100 beats per minute.

The single received two platinum certifications from the Recording Industry Association of America (RIAA): one for sales and streaming figures and one for mastertone sales. It was also certified double platinum by the British Phonographic Industry (BPI).

== Critical reception ==
The song received critical acclaim and appeared on various critics' and music publications' best song rankings. Pitchfork listed it at number forty-eight of the top 100 tracks of 2006 with Stephen Troussé writing that it "recalled the crypto-emotional coolness of Cameo circa "Single Life," and proved the most refreshingly minimal R&B hit of the year," while Marc Hogan described it in 2011 for the same publication as an "icily minimal electro-R&B seduction" with its "steamy lyrical content and flat, distanced delivery helped it sell more than 1 million digital downloads en route to becoming an international hit." Blender ranked it as the 11th greatest song of 2006, while Stylus listed it at number seventeen of the top 50 singles of the year and Porcys ranked it as the 2nd best song of 2006, hailing the track as "genius" for its "remarkable versatility". It also appeared at number twenty-two on The Village Voice’s Pazz & Jop end-of-year critics' poll of 2006 and number forty-one on Rolling Stone’s 100 best songs of 2006, commenting: "Cassie ain't necessarily the most gifted singer in the world, but none of the world's most gifted singers have done an electro tune this spellbinding lately."

Complex included "Me & U" at number fifty-four on their best songs of the decade list, blurbing: "Under Cassie's coos to a guy she's ready to get busy with are shooting synths and chord progressions that, now evolved, are the types of soundbeds rappers like Fabolous ask to jump on often." Billboard ranked it as one of the 50 sexiest songs of all time in 2022 and one of the 500 best pop songs of all time in a 2023 staff list, saying: "A hypnotically twinkling and deeply synthed statement of romantic intention that quickly became a classic of the ringtone pop era."

== Chart performance ==
"Me & U" topped the US Billboard Hot R&B/Hip-Hop Songs chart and peaked at number three on the US Billboard Hot 100 for four consecutive weeks from July 22 to August 12, 2006. In the UK, the song entered the UK Singles Chart at number 23 and rose to its peak of number six the following week. The song also did well around the rest of Europe, including France, Germany, and Ireland.

== Music video ==
The official music video for "Me & U" was directed by Ray Kay and had its world premiere on BET's 106 & Park on May 31, 2006. A few days later, Cassie appeared on MTV's Total Request Live for a "First Look" segment to premiere the video on June 2. In the video, Cassie comes in at a dance studio with her MP3 player which is playing "Me & U" while improvising some lyrics from the chorus. She puts the song on and begins to dance and sing along, hurting herself while doing a spinning move, pouring water over her body, changing her dancing outfit to a dress and high heels and then being able to successfully complete the spinning move later on. It drew comparisons to Janet Jackson's "The Pleasure Principle", described as evoking Jackson's "impromptu solo dance rehearsal" during the video's mirror scenes. Cassie stated: "I'm a diehard Janet Jackson fan. A lot of people compare my video for "Me & U" to hers for "Pleasure Principle". I was just rehearsing in the studio, they filmed me and the record label thought it would be great for the video. I'd love to emulate her career. She's incredible, from her moves to her voice."

Around the same time, an unofficial uncut version of a low-budget and more risqué music video for the song surfaced online. Cassie went on to denounce the leak on her blog, stating: "Well, the truth is, is that I did shoot a video for this song before. It was extremely low budget and it was before I signed to a label. Unfortunately that BAD video that's going around, I felt like it scarred the very beginnings of a promising future." She explained she wanted the official version to feature just herself as the song is already "very suggestive" and "there's no guy because I personally felt that it would have been tacky." She elaborated in an interview the original video was directed by Little X, who had invited her to Toronto to film it and, while she initially felt pressure to do something different to help the song stand out, it didn't feel authentic: "I saw it [the video] and was like, 'No. This isn't me." [Little X] was like, 'Ok let's edit it and do it again.' He edited it, and it didn't change anything. I was like, 'Look, I can't do this. I'm sorry. It's not me.' About a week later it was leaked on the internet... uncut. Everything was just raw. I was so embarrassed. I didn't expect this."

== Charts ==
=== Weekly charts ===
Chart (2006)	Peak position
Australia (ARIA)	12
Australian Urban (ARIA)	4
Austria (Ö3 Austria Top 40)	34
Belgium (Ultratop 50 Flanders)	16
Belgium (Ultratop 50 Wallonia)	15
Canada CHR/Top 40 (Billboard)	6
Denmark (Tracklisten)	17
Europe (Eurochart Hot 100)	9
Finland (Suomen virallinen lista)	4
France (SNEP)	8
Germany (Deutsche Black Charts)	3
Germany (GfK)	12
Ireland (IRMA)	9
Lithuania (EHR)	5
Netherlands (Dutch Top 40)	36
Netherlands (Single Top 100)	47
New Zealand (Recorded Music NZ)	4
Scotland Singles (OCC)	13
Sweden (Sverigetopplistan)	22
Switzerland (Schweizer Hitparade)	11
UK Singles (OCC)	6
UK Hip Hop/R&B (OCC)	2
US Billboard Hot 100	3
US Dance/Mix Show Airplay (Billboard)	22
US Hot Latin Songs (Billboard)	38
US Hot R&B/Hip-Hop Songs (Billboard)	1
US Pop Airplay (Billboard)	3
US Rhythmic Airplay (Billboard)	1

=== Year-end charts ===
Chart (2006)	Position
Australia (ARIA)	62
Australian Urban (ARIA)	26
Europe (Eurochart Hot 100)	59
France (SNEP)	82
Germany (Deutsche Black Charts)	18
Switzerland (Schweizer Hitparade)	93
UK Singles (OCC)	50
UK Urban (Music Week)	10
US Billboard Hot 100	14
US Hot R&B/Hip-Hop Songs (Billboard)	27
US Mainstream Top 40 (Billboard)	15
US Rhythmic (Billboard)	1

=== Decade-end charts ===
Chart (2000–2009)	Position
US Rhythmic (Billboard)	16

== Certifications ==
Region	Certification	Certified units/sales
Canada (Music Canada) Ringtone	Gold	20,000^{*}
Canada (Music Canada) Ringtone, remix version	Gold	20,000^{*}
Denmark (IFPI Danmark)	Gold	45,000^{‡}
Germany (BVMI)	Gold	300,000^{‡}
New Zealand (RMNZ)	3× Platinum	90,000^{‡}
United Kingdom (BPI)	2× Platinum	1,200,000^{‡}
United States (RIAA)	Platinum	1,000,000^{‡}
United States (RIAA) Mastertone	Platinum	1,000,000^{*}
^{*} Sales figures based on certification alone.^{‡} Sales+streaming figures based on certification alone.

== Release history ==
Region	Date	Format	Label	Ref.
United States	April 25, 2006	12-inch vinyl	Bad Boy	
United States	May 15, 2006	Contemporary hit radio; rhythmic contemporary radio	Bad Boy	
United States	May 16, 2006	Digital download	Bad Boy	
United Kingdom	August 14, 2006	Digital download	Bad Boy	
United States	August 22, 2006	12-inch vinyl (remixes)	Bad Boy	
Australia	August 28, 2006	CD	Bad Boy	
