= Les Is More =

Studio album by Ryan Leslie
- Released: October 22, 2012
- Recorded: 2010–2012
- Genre: R&B, Hip hop
- Length: 51:31
- Label: NextSelection; BDG; RED
- Producer: Ryan Leslie, Cardiak

Ryan Leslie chronology
Transition (2009)	Les Is More (2012)	Black Mozart (2013)

Singles from Les Is More
- 1. "Glory" Released: April 19, 2011; 2. "Beautiful Lie" Released: November 30, 2011

Les Is More is the third studio album by R&B singer-songwriter and producer Ryan Leslie, it was released on October 22, 2012. The album features a guest appearance from Fabolous. Another version of "Swiss Francs" (Remix) with French rapper Booba is present on the European album.

== Track listing ==
No.	Title	Writer(s)	Length
1.	"Glory"	Anthony Leslie	4:28
2.	"Beautiful Lie"	Leslie	2:32
3.	"Good Girl"	Leslie	3:17
4.	"5 Minute Freshen Up"	Leslie	5:18
5.	"Dress You to Undress You"	Leslie, Sharon Robinson	4:08
6.	"Maybachs & Diamonds"	Leslie	3:26
7.	"Swiss Francs"	Leslie	4:10
8.	"Ups & Downs (Prelude)"	Leslie	0:44
9.	"Ups & Downs"	Leslie	4:43
10.	"Ready or Not"	Leslie	3:04
11.	"Lovers & Mountains"	Leslie	3:56
12.	"The Black Flag"	Leslie, Carl McCormick, Adam Feeney	4:31
13.	"Joan of Arc"	Leslie	4:39
14.	"Beautiful Lie" (Remix) (featuring Fabolous)	Leslie, John Jackson	2:34
Total length:			51:31

European Bonus Tracks
No.	Title	Writer(s)	Length
15.	"Swiss Francs" (Remix) (featuring Booba)	Leslie, Elie Yaffa	3:21
16.	"#Winning"	Leslie	4:38

German/Austrian Exclusive Snipes Store Edition Bonus Tracks
No.	Title	Writer(s)	Length
15.	"Swiss Francs" (Remix) (featuring Fard)	Leslie, Fard	3:22

== Personnel ==
- Ryan Leslie - vocals, all keyboards, drum programming, recording, mixing
- Jermaine Parrish - drums on "Glory"
- DeWayne "DW" Wright - bass on "Glory" and "Joan of Arc"
- Chris Morgan - guitar on "Glory", "Dress You to Undress You" and "Joan of Arc"
- Gabriel Lambirth - guitar on "Lovers & Mountains"
- Rico Beats - drum programming on "Joan of Arc"
- Travis Sayles - keyboards on "Glory"
- Pawel Szarjeko, Anthony Palazzole, Will Hensley, Moses Gallart, Anthony Cruz - recording and mixing
- Chris Athens - mastering
- Armen Djerrahian, Evan Rogers, Getm Jaf - photography
- Grandarmy - art direction and design
- Armen Djerrahian, Evan Rogers, Getm Jaf, Alex Bittan & Brian Gregory - visual media
- Adam Meyer, Yamill Vallecillo - Digital Media & Application Development

== Charts ==
Chart (2012)	Peak position
Belgian Albums (Ultratop Flanders)	132
Belgian Albums (Ultratop Wallonia)	124
French Albums (SNEP)	81
German Albums (Offizielle Top 100)	85
Swiss Albums (Schweizer Hitparade)	85
UK Independent Albums (OCC)	48
UK R&B Albums (OCC)	26
US Billboard 200	74
US Top R&B/Hip-Hop Albums (Billboard)	12
US Independent Albums (Billboard)	15
