= How It Was Supposed to Be =

Single by Ryan Leslie

from the album Ryan Leslie
- Released: December 23, 2008
- Genre: Hip-hop; R&B
- Length: 3:25
- Label: NextSelection/Universal
- Songwriter: Ryan Leslie
- Producer: Ryan Leslie

Ryan Leslie singles chronology
| "Addiction" (2008) | "How It Was Supposed to Be" (2008) | "Good Lovin'" (2008) |

"How It Was Supposed to Be" is a song by American singer and record producer Ryan Leslie, released by Universal Motown Records on December 23, 2008, as the third single from his debut album Ryan Leslie (2009).

== Music videos ==
There were three music videos made for this song.

- The first video released in December 2008, takes place in a building. It also has an alternate instrumental, having more of a rock-influenced sound than the original.
- The second (official) music video consists of a more military-theme. It starts with Ryan and three other men crooning and deals with Leslie shipping out to sea. While he is on stage performing, a man played by Tyson Beckford tries to steal his girlfriend. Which leads to a fight between the two at the end of the video. This version was released to BET's 106 & Park on January 16, 2009, and later ranked at #64 on BET's Notarized: Top 100 Videos of 2009 countdown.

== Remixes ==
- "How It Was Supposed to Be" (Official Remix) - Ryan Leslie featuring Jadakiss

== Charts ==
| Chart (2008–09) | Peak position |
|---|---|
| US Billboard Hot R&B/Hip-Hop Songs | 71 |
| US Hot R&B/Hip-Hop Airplay (Billboard) | 70 |
