= Fly Together =

2011 single by Red Café featuring Rick Ross and Ryan Leslie

Single by Red Café featuring Ryan Leslie and Rick Ross
- Released: September 13, 2011
- Recorded: 2011
- Genre: Hip hop, R&B
- Length: 4:57
- Label: Street Family; ShakeDown; Konvict; Desert Storm; Bad Boy; Interscope
- Songwriters: Anthony Leslie; Jermaine Denny; William Leonard Roberts II
- Producer: Ryan Leslie

Red Café singles chronology
"We Get It On" (2011)	"Fly Together" (2011)

Ryan Leslie singles chronology
"So Forgetful" (2011)	"Fly Together" (2011)

Rick Ross singles chronology
"Anything (To Find You)" (2011)	"Fly Together" (2011)	"You the Boss" (2011)

Music video
- "Fly Together" on YouTube

"Fly Together" is a 2011 song by American rapper Red Café, released by his own label ShakeDown Entertainment, Street Family Records, Konvict Muzik, Desert Storm Records, Bad Boy Records and Interscope Records on September 13, 2011 as a promotional single for his debut studio album ShakeDown, which was never released. The song features guest appearances from fellow American rapper Rick Ross and American singer Ryan Leslie; all three performers co-wrote the track while Leslie produced it.

"Fly Together" peaked at number 44 on the Hot R&B/Hip-Hop Songs chart and number 22 on the Hot Rap Songs chart; it remains Red Cafe's sole entry on both charts as a lead artist.

== Remix ==
On December 9, 2011 a remix was released, featuring Trey Songz, Wale and J. Cole. The remix is included on Red Café's third mixtape Hell's Kitchen, which was released on January 13, 2012.

== Music video ==
On October 7, 2011 a trailer for the music video was released through Café's official YouTube page. Directed by Colin Tilley, it was released on October 14, 2011.

== Chart performance ==
"Fly Together" entered the U.S. Billboard R&B/Hip-Hop Songs on the week of September 12, 2011 at number 66. It has since peaked at number 44.

=== Charts ===
Chart (2011–12)	Peak position
US Billboard R&B/Hip-Hop Songs	44
US Billboard Rap Songs	22

== Radio and release history ==
Country	Date	Format	Label
United States	September 13, 2011	Digital download	Bad Boy, Konvict Music, Interscope
United States	October 4, 2011	Urban contemporary radio	Bad Boy, Konvict Music, Interscope
