= Transition (Ryan Leslie album) =

Studio album by Ryan Leslie
- Released: November 3, 2009
- Recorded: 2008–2009
- Genres: R&B; hip hop
- Length: 55:53
- Labels: NextSelection; Casablanca; Universal
- Producer: Ryan Leslie

Ryan Leslie chronology
Ryan Leslie (2009)	Transition (2009)	Les Is More (2012)

Singles from Transition
- 1. "You're Not My Girl" Released: June 29, 2009; 2. "I Choose You" Released: January 2010

Professional ratings
Review scores
Source	Rating
About.com	3/5 stars
Allmusic	3.5/5 stars
DJBooth.net	3.0/5 stars
Hiphopdx	3.0/5 stars
Rap2k	4.0/5 stars
Sound-Savvy	3.0/5 stars

Transition is the second album by American R&B singer-songwriter and producer Ryan Leslie. This is the second album by Leslie released in 2009, nine months after his self-titled debut album. The entire album is written, arranged, produced and engineered by Ryan Leslie. It was inspired by a lady whom Leslie met during a rehearsal for his showcase at New York's S.O.B.'s. They went on to have a relationship during the summer of 2009, which the album tells the story of. The first single for the album is entitled "You're Not My Girl", which was released in July 2009. The second single "I Choose You" was released in January 2010. The album was nominated for Best Contemporary R&B album at the 53rd Annual Grammy Awards. The Album has sold 60,000 copies in US.

== Track listing ==
All tracks are written by Ryan Leslie, except "Something That I Like", co-written with Terrence Thornton.

No.	Title	Length
1.	"Never Gonna Break Up"	4:13
2.	"Something That I Like" (featuring Pusha T)	4:08
3.	"Zodiac"	3:44
4.	"Is It Real Love?"	4:04
5.	"Sunday Night"	4:27
6.	"You're Not My Girl"	3:54
7.	"To the Top"	4:53
8.	"Nothing"	4:21
9.	"Guardian Angel"	3:31
10.	"All My Love"	4:24
11.	"I Choose You"	2:54

Deluxe Edition bonus tracks
No.	Title	Length
12.	"When We Dance"	3:30
13.	"Promise Not 2 Call"	3:37
14.	"Rescue U"	4:25

== Personnel ==
- Ryan Leslie – producer, engineer, mixing, executive producer, instruments and programming (1, 2, 5, 6, 9–14), additional instruments and programming (3, 4, 7, 8), guitar engineer (4)
- Chris Athens – mastering
- Daniel Betancourt – Pusha T vocal engineer (2)
- Sandra Brummels – creative direction
- Alek Edmonds – assistant engineer (2), assistant guitar engineer (4)
- Anthony Mandler – photography
- Chris "Morganism" Morgan – guitar (3, 6–8)
- Anthony Palazzole – engineer (1, 3–7, 9–11), guitar engineer (8)
- Brent Paschke – guitars (4)
- Jermaine "Maineo" Parrish – drums (3)
- Dwayne "DW" Wright – bass guitar (3, 6, 7)
