= Diamond Girl (Ryan Leslie song) =

Single by Ryan Leslie

from the album Ryan Leslie
- Released: December 11, 2007
- Genre: Hip-hop
- Length: 3:46
- Label: NextSelection/Universal
- Songwriter: Ryan Leslie
- Producer: Ryan Leslie

Ryan Leslie singles chronology
"Used to Be" (2006)	"Diamond Girl" (2007)	"Addiction" (2008)

"Diamond Girl" is the debut song by the American record producer and singer Ryan Leslie. Released on December 11, 2007, the song serves as the lead single from his debut album, Ryan Leslie.

== Remixes ==
The official remix features Craig David and Mims. American hip-hop and gangsta rap group G-Unit recorded their own version of the song, titled "Bottom Girl" and featured it on their mixtape Return of the Body Snatchers (Volume 1) (2008).

== Commercial performance ==
The single peaked at number 35 on the Billboard Hot R&B/Hip-Hop Songs chart, and at number 95 on the U.S. Billboard Hot 100.

== Charts ==
Chart performance for "Diamond Girl"
Chart (2008)	Peak position
US Billboard Hot 100	95
US Hot R&B/Hip-Hop Songs (Billboard)	35
US Hot R&B/Hip-Hop Airplay (Billboard)	35
US Rhythmic (Billboard)	22
