= Ryan Leslie (album) =

Studio album by Ryan Leslie
- Released: February 10, 2009
- Recorded: 2007–2008
- Genre: R&B; hip-hop
- Length: 48:12
- Label: NextSelection; Casablanca; Universal
- Producer: Ryan Leslie

Ryan Leslie chronology
Ryan Leslie (2009)	Transition (2009)

Singles from Ryan Leslie
- 1. "Diamond Girl" Released: December 11, 2007; 2. "Addiction" Released: August 19, 2008; 3. "How It Was Supposed to Be" Released: December 23, 2008

Professional ratings
Review scores
Source	Rating
AllMusic	4/5 stars
The Boston Globe	(mixed)
Entertainment Weekly	B
New York Times	(unfavorable)
Okayplayer	77/100
Pitchfork	8.0/10
PopMatters	8/10 stars
Rolling Stone	2.5/5 stars
Vibe	(mixed)

Ryan Leslie is the debut album of the singer-songwriter and producer Ryan Leslie, released February 10, 2009, on Universal Motown in the United States. Three singles were released from the album: "Diamond Girl", "Addiction", and "How It Was Supposed to Be". The album was produced by Leslie. While it received some negative criticism regarding Leslie's songwriting, Ryan Leslie earned generally favorable reviews from music critics.

== Track listing ==
All tracks are written by Ryan Leslie, except "Addiction", written by Leslie, John Jackson, Stevie Wonder and Susaye Greene-Browne.

Ryan Leslie track listing
No.	Title	Length
1.	"Diamond Girl"	3:44
2.	"Addiction" (featuring Cassie and Fabolous)	4:00
3.	"You're Fly"	4:27
4.	"Quicksand"	3:43
5.	"Valentine"	3:44
6.	"Just Right"	4:43
7.	"How It Was Supposed to Be"	3:22
8.	"I-R-I-N-A"	4:09
9.	"Out of the Blue"	3:41
10.	"Shouldn't Have to Wait"	4:11
11.	"Wanna Be Good"	4:01
12.	"Gibberish"	4:20

Notes

- "Addiction" contains elements of "I Can't Help It", written by Stevie Wonder and Susaye Greene-Browne.

== Personnel ==
- Ryan Leslie: All keyboards, drum programming, background vocals and producer
- Chanel Iman: Additional keyboard on "Just Right"
- Tom "T-Bone" Wolk: Bass and guitar on "You're Fly", "Shouldn't Have to Wait" and "Wanna Be Good"
- Brent Paschke: Bass and guitar on "Quicksand"
- Jermaine Parrish: Drums and additional percussion on "I-R-I-N-A"
- Al Carty: Bass on "I-R-I-N-A"
- Tommy Mottola: Additional guitar on "Wanna Be Good"
- David Sancious: Keyboard on "Wanna Be Good"
- Recording engineers: Ryan Leslie, Anthony Palazzole, Scott Elgin, Rob Kinelski, Jim Caruana
- Mixing engineers: Ryan Leslie, Kevin Crouse, Jim Caruana
- Mastering: Chris Athens
- Photography: Armen Djerrahian, Kameron Crone

== Charts ==
Chart performance for Ryan Leslie
Chart (2008)	Peak position
US Billboard 200	35
US Top R&B/Hip-Hop Albums (Billboard)	9
