= Cassie (album) =

Studio album by Cassie
- Released: August 8, 2006
- Recorded: 2005–2006
- Studios: The Apartment; Right Track Recording; Integrated; Sterling Sound, New York City
- Genre: R&B
- Length: 35:22
- Labels: NextSelection; Bad Boy; Atlantic
- Producer: Ryan Leslie

Cassie chronology
Cassie (2006)	RockaByeBaby (2013)

Singles from Cassie
- 1. "Me & U" Released: April 25, 2006; 2. "Long Way 2 Go" Released: August 28, 2006

Cassie is the only studio album by American singer Cassie, released on August 8, 2006, by NextSelection Life Group, Bad Boy Records, and Atlantic Records. Cassie was discovered by record producer Ryan Leslie, who helped her record demo tapes. After Cassie was signed by Diddy, the founder of Bad Boy Records, she continued to work with Leslie who produced the entire album. Musically, Cassie is primarily an R&B album with elements of pop, hip hop, electro and soul music.

The album was well-received critically and praised for its production. In addition to being called "confection", it drew comparisons to Janet Jackson. It debuted at number four on the US Billboard 200 with first-week sales of 100,374 copies, staying on the chart for thirteen weeks. By January 2010, the album had sold 650,000 copies worldwide. Cassie received a vinyl reissue nine years after its original release, reasserting its cult following and influence in certain circles according to music critics.

"Me & U" was released as the lead single from the album on May 16, 2006. It peaked at number 3 on the US Billboard Hot 100 and hit the top 20 in ten other countries. "Long Way 2 Go" was released as the second and final single from the album in September 2006. It reached number 97 on the Hot 100, but achieved more success internationally, charting within the top 40 of various countries, including number 12 in the United Kingdom.

== Background ==
At the age of 14, Cassie began modeling, and when she was 16, she was modeling for local department stores, Delia's fashion catalog, and Seventeen magazine. She also briefly appeared in the music video for R&B singer Mario's "Just a Friend 2002". Encouraged by producer Rockwilder, Cassie took vocal lessons as well as using her school's performing arts program, taking modern ballet. She finished high school in 2004, and moved to New York City where she modeled and attended classes at the Broadway Dance Center. She began booking print and commercial modeling gigs while being represented by Wilhelmina Models.

== Development ==
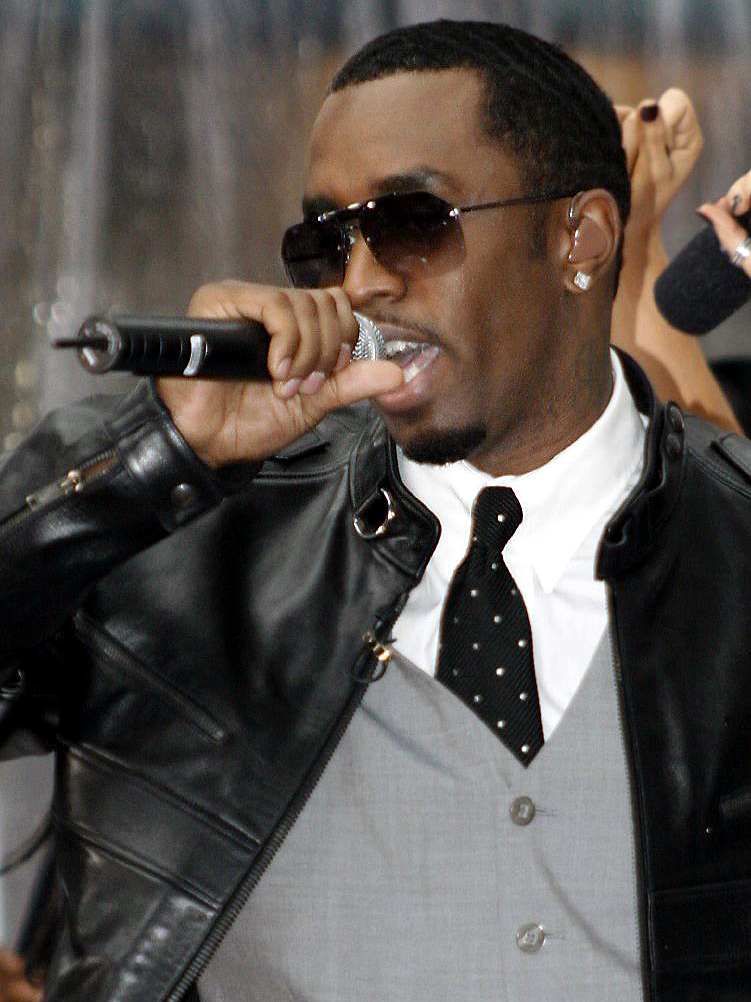
Diddy, founder of Bad Boy Records, signed Cassie to his record label.

Ryan Leslie started spotting Cassie at clubs and parties in late 2004. They were introduced by Diddy's makeup artist, who had worked with her on a modeling photoshoot, and in February 2005, the two wrote a duet called "Kiss Me", as a result of Cassie being asked by her mother to record a song as a birthday gift. After recording the track, Leslie played it for music executive Tommy Mottola. Mottola offered Cassie a management deal, and Leslie signed her to NextSelection Lifestyle Group, his music-media company founded with online marketing partner Rasheed Richmond. Leslie wrote and produced Cassie's first single, "Me & U", in 2005. That same year, they set up a MySpace page, and the song went viral. Diddy heard "Me & U" in a club, and Leslie convinced him to partner his Bad Boy Records with Leslie's NextSelection imprint for the release of Cassie's debut album. "I think that was one of the only songs that we didn't do organically—I'll literally come in and we wrote from scratch [...] I love how the tone feels of the song. It's not too much. It's really simple and nobody has anything like this."

Leslie produced the album, which is a mix of pop and R&B. Cassie described her sound as "mellow, chill, and easy to relate to. This album represents what I've always wanted to do." She said in another interview, "I rap, I sing, I do my R&B, I do my slow songs and stuff that the girls will love, I have a down South joint, I have a rock song that I did with my girls–this band called Pretty Boys. [...] It has some funk, some old stuff, it's really fun." She paid tribute to her Filipino culture by incorporating OPM sounds into some of the ballads. While describing the process of working with Leslie, she stated, "I will talk about situations that I was going through at the time and we'll talk about that and it comes straight from the heart that's why it works out well between us," continuing about her songwriting input, "I was just kind of going along with it trying to get the vibe. I'm starting to get into it and I'm excited to write." Cassie also mentioned "Not with You" was one of her favorite songs, "It's slow, it's simple, and you get to really hear me as opposed to all the synthesizers and everything in the background," and compared the second single, "Long Way 2 Go", to Vanity 6's vibe. "I'm hoping to show I can do a wide range of things," concluding, "The whole album really just goes back to love songs."

== Release and promotion ==
The album was released on August 8, 2006. Cassie made television appearances on MTV's Total Request Live and BET's 106 & Park to support the album on its release week. Her first televised performances were described as "rocky" and "less-than-stellar", but Diddy said that it was due to her inexperience, continuing that he would be "with her through her development," and has no "question on her ability [to sing]". Cassie later added: "I don’t think I should have done those shows. But I didn't know I had a choice. I would sit in rehearsals and sing full songs a cappella. I wasn't Beyoncé, but I wasn't fucking up. Then I got out there and was like, 'Oh my God, millions of people are watching me right now. I have stage fright.'"

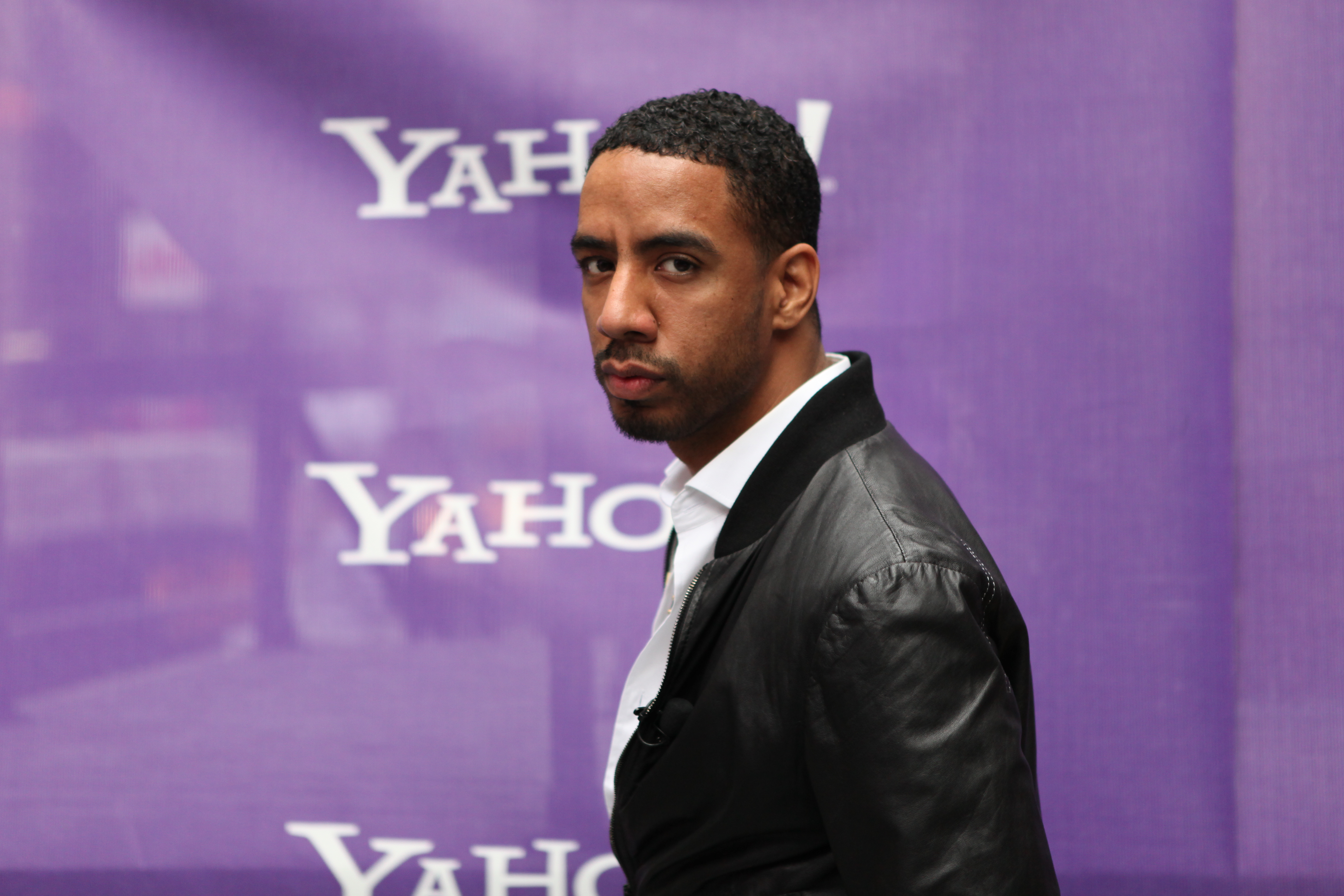
Ryan Leslie wrote and produced the album.

On August 9, 2006, she had an album release party, hosted by Danny A and Ryan Leslie at New York's Marquee. Later that month, Cassie was a part of Warner Music Japan's annual showcase at the Heatseekers Convention in Tokyo. On September 7, 2006, she performed at the NFL Opening Kickoff presented by the National Football League and NBC in Miami Beach.

== Singles ==
"Me & U" was released as the lead single from the album on May 16, 2006, peaking in the top 10 of several charts, having spent a month at number 3 on the US Billboard Hot 100 and seven weeks atop the US Airplay chart, receiving a Platinum certification by the Recording Industry Association of America selling over one million digital downloads. The official music video for the track featured Cassie in a solo dance rehearsal, which drew comparisons to Janet Jackson's "The Pleasure Principle" visuals from 1987. Cassie, a fan of Jackson, explained the concept came from Mottola and Diddy who suggested the idea after watching her rehearsal videos dancing alone in front of the mirror.

"Long Way 2 Go" was released as the second single from the album in September 2006. It did not perform as well as its predecessor in the United States, only reaching number 97 on the Hot 100. Its music video did, however, peak at number 3 on MTV's Total Request Live, and the single did well internationally, reaching the top 40 of various countries, in addition to number 12 on the UK Singles Chart. No further singles were released.

== Critical reception ==
Professional ratings
Review scores
Source	Rating
AllMusic	4/5 stars
Blender	4/5 stars
DJBooth.net	3.5/5 stars
Rolling Stone	3.5/5 stars
Slant Magazine	3/5 stars
Stylus Magazine	D+
USA Today	2/4 stars

Upon its release, Cassie received generally positive reviews from music critics. The Washington Post's Chris Richards described it as "One of the best pop albums released this year sounds it came from outer space. Or the future. Or maybe just heaven," adding that "Cassie's voice is incredibly sweet and somewhat hypnotic." Rob Sheffield of Rolling Stone praised Leslie's production, "a master of the minimal electro hook, whether he's going for an R&B ballad ("Kiss Me") or hip-hop ("Long Way 2 Go")," while Cassie "shines with her understated cool", highlighting "What Do U Want" for mashing "bhangra with the Go-Go's [...] But the whole album coasts on the hypnotic groove of "Me and U"."

In Slant Magazine, Sal Cinquemani also praised the production, making comparisons between Cassie and Janet Jackson, continuing to say "the album, which is only slightly longer than half-an-hour in length, plays to the singer's strengths, maximizing her limited range by keeping the songs short and the production simple." Mallory O'Donnell from Stylus Magazine called Cassie's vocals "confection", claiming that she "is possessed of a voice that's like candy: sweet, simple, and see-through-thin when you stretch it out like taffy," pointing out potential in "Cassie's still-developing vocal presence." Writing for the Los Angeles Times, Casey Dolan considered that Cassie "has fashioned an album that slots easily into the new hybrid stream of R&B with nods toward hip-hop and pop. Her distinguishing vocal delivery is soft and languid, unlike almost every other singer out there who shouts you into submission," continuing that it "deftly flirts with adult themes but in a youthful way".

Kelefa Sanneh of The New York Times said that the album "mastered R&B-lite songs over space-age beats", noting the track "Ditto" as a standout. AllMusic editor Andy Kellman commented that "As a vocalist, Cassie has enough character and ability to sell her material without fail. And there will never not be a need for a vocalist who doesn't handle each stage of a relationship as if her life depends on it." Blender's Dorian Lynskey wrote, "Even the 35-minute running time indicates a rare self-control that makes this the most consistently arresting R&B debut since Kelis's." Steve Jones of USA Today felt despite vocal limitations, Cassie is "engaging enough to keep things interesting." Clover Hope from Billboard stated the album "offers sexy, laid-back tunes, dainty ballads and midtempo dance jams" and its "whispery piano runs and simple basslines create a fresh listening experience". In an editorial review on Amazon.com, Tammy La Gorce opined that, other than the singles, "this brief disc bumps along on the greatness of its beats. Credit Cassie, though, for concocting a whole lotta 'tude," calling her "a master of sass, a guru of guile".

== Impact and vinyl reissue ==
Throughout the decade following the album release and with its follow-up slated and shelved twice, Cassie developed a cult following. She has been credited as one of the pioneers of "experimental R&B", and it was drawn attention to "how far she's consistently been ahead of trends like the wave of atmospheric R&B". "Cassie's is the kind of voice that demands your attention without caring whether or not it gets it," Noisey's Emma Garland explained, "It's spacious, seductive and borderline melancholy, which is why her material has been heavily sampled and remixed by an endless list of artists and producers." Her debut album was subject of more recognition, particularly in the underground circuit. "Me & U" ranked in multiple "Best of..." lists by The Guardian, Complex and The Village Voice, among others. "["Me & U"] recalled the crypto-emotional coolness of Cameo circa "Single Life," and proved the most refreshingly minimal r&b hit of the year," said Stephen Troussé for Pitchfork, while Marc Hogan wrote for the same publication: "[Cassie] hasn't had a sophomore slump, because as of press time, [she] still hasn't released a sophomore album. Her self-titled 2006 debut [...] might just have been enough."

"[Cassie] is another CD-only album that I, and many others judging by the pre-orders on this one, love. It’s another one of those 'why wasn’t it ever on vinyl?!' mysteries [...] it’s a great, influential record, like the LP Aaliyah could’ve gone on to make in terms of the production; it’s got that 'mad-slow techno' vibe that Weatherall talked about in Jockey Slut all those years ago when discussing 'acid r&b.' It's well documented how her icy delivery and the cold production made a big impression on the Tri Angle Records crew as well as others like Four Tet and The xx etc."

— Be With's founder Rob Butler talks about Cassie.

In October 2014, Fact reported that Cassie's debut album would be appearing on vinyl for the first time, calling it "influential" and a "minimalist R&B classic". On July 10, 2015, the LP was released by Be With Records, an English record label who specialise in reissuing unavailable material. Described as a "seductive debut" and "late-night classic of chilly electro-soul", it was officially licensed and cut at Abbey Road Studios, continuing, "The dark, hypnotic high ends coupled with Cassie's ice-queen delivery made this stand out from the tired crowd of mainstream r'n'b at the time. It still sounds wholly and eerily unique." A release party was held at Ace Hotel London's Miranda club on July 10, 2015.

The reissue was acclaimed by critics. Mikey Jones from Fact named Cassie a "must-hear reissue", that "reasserts the album's cult following and continuing influence." It appeared at number nine on their "Best Reissues of 2015" year-end list, stating "time has proved kind to the album, and its playful, modernist beauty." Writing for Record Collector, Paul Bowler noted tracks "About Time" and "Kiss Me" as first-rate examples of "this hidden talent's slick soul" and "her silken, sensual and soulful vocals – at times vulnerable, at others icy cool [... are] the perfect foil for the harder, more street-savvy strains of R&B" and was later picked as the top reissue of 2015 by the magazine. Bleep.com posted: "this record paved the way for a number of radio-built R&B sounds which we hear today", comparing its minimal production to DJ Mustard, while Norman Records also referenced its impact. The Quietus listed it as sixth among the top 100 of reissues, compilations, DJ mixes, live albums, and other releases of 2015, "with its ultra crisp, economical production, giant shiny hooks and ultra-satisfying bass, with tracks evenly divided between clubby R&B and straight up pop." Meanwhile, Cassie appeared at number twenty on The Vinyl Factory's "30 Best Vinyl Reissues of 2015", commenting the record "is so dark and sexy it should come with a health warning as Cassie's voice rides over some of the most minimal and stone cold frozen beats ever laid down." In 2021, Rolling Stone named Cassie one of the greatest "one-album wonders" in music history, describing it as "the most brilliantly minimalist R&B album of its era."

== Commercial performance ==
Cassie debuted at number four on the US Billboard 200 on August 26, 2006, with 100,374 copies sold in its first week. It stayed in the top twenty for two weeks, in the top forty for three weeks and on the chart for thirteen weeks. As of April 2008, the album had sold 321,000 copies in the United States. It charted in other major international territories including France at forty-eight, Germany at eighty-two, while peaking in the Netherlands at seventy-eight. In Switzerland, it peaked at number fifty-seven, in Belgium Wallonia at number seventy-eight and Flanders at ninety-six. The album appeared at number six on the Australian Hitseekers Albums and on the Australian Urban Albums at number thirteen.

It also peaked within the top forty in Japan at number thirty and the United Kingdom at thirty-three, reaching number three on the R&B Albums Chart and receiving a Silver certification by the British Phonographic Industry for combined sales of over 60,000 in 2015. Cassie had sold 650,000 copies worldwide as of January 2010.

== Track listing ==
Cassie – Standard edition
No.	Title	Writer(s)	Producer(s)	Length
1.	"Me & U"	Ryan Leslie	Leslie	3:12
2.	"Long Way 2 Go"	Leslie; Cassie Ventura	Leslie	3:39
3.	"About Time"	Leslie; Youness Maroufi	Leslie	3:33
4.	"Kiss Me"	Leslie; Angela Beyincé; Vidal Davis; Garrett Hamler; Andre Harris; Beyoncé Knowles; Kelendria Rowland; Tenitra Williams	Leslie	4:07
5.	"Call U Out"	Leslie; Brandon Fletcher	Leslie	3:32
6.	"Just One Nite"	Leslie	Leslie	4:06
7.	"Hope You're Behaving (Interlude)"	Leslie; Ventura	Leslie	0:36
8.	"Not with You"	Leslie; Maroufi	Leslie; Uness	3:17
9.	"Ditto"	Leslie; Corey Williams	Leslie	3:34
10.	"What Do U Want"	Leslie; Galadriel Masterson; Hopey Rock; Ventura	Leslie; G. Masterson; H. Rock	3:13
11.	"Miss Your Touch"	Leslie; Chino Lewis	Leslie; C. Maurice	2:33
Total length:				35:22

Cassie — South Asian digital edition (bonus track)
No.	Title	Writer(s)	Producer(s)	Length
12.	"When Your Body Is Talking"	Ventura; JY Park; Leslie; T. E. Kwon; S. U. Beam; G. Ealey	Park; Tae Kwon; Seo "Bomb"; Leslie	3:43
Total length:				39:05

Cassie — Circuit City edition (bonus track)
No.	Title	Writer(s)	Producer(s)	Length
13.	"Can't Do It Without You"	Leslie; Makeba Riddick	Leslie	3:55
Total length:				43:00

Cassie — Japanese edition (bonus track)
No.	Title	Writer(s)	Producer(s)	Length
13.	"Me & U" (remix featuring Diddy and Yung Joc)	Leslie; Sean Combs; Jasiel Robinson	Leslie	4:48
Total length:				43:53

Cassie — Target edition (bonus DVD content)
No.	Title	Length
1.	"No Regrets – The EPK"
2.	"The Making of "Me & U" Video"
3.	"Me & U" (music video)

Notes

- "Kiss Me" contains interpolations from the composition "T-Shirt" written by Davis, Hamler, Harris, Knowles, Rowland and Williams, as performed by Destiny's Child.

== Credits and personnel ==
Credits adapted from AllMusic and the liner notes of Cassie.

- Eric Archibald – styling
- Angela Beyincé – composer
- Cassie – vocals, primary artist, background vocals, composer
- Champion Entertainment Organization – direction
- Sean "Diddy" Combs – executive producer
- Vidal Davis – composer
- Brandon Fletcher – composer
- Chris Gehringer – mastering
- Akisia Grigsby – creative director, design
- Garrett Hamler – composer
- Andre Harris – composer
- Beyoncé Knowles – composer
- Kevin Krouse – engineer, mixing
- Charlie Langella – photography
- Ryan Leslie – arranger, audio production, engineer, executive producer, instrumentation, main personnel, mixing, piano, producer, programming, various instruments, vocals
- Youness Maroufi – background vocals, composer, producer, programming
- Galadriel Masterson – engineer, composer, additional vocals
- Chino Maurice – composer, guitars, producer
- Gwendolyn Niles – executive producer, project manager
- Harve Pierre – co-executive producer
- Hopey Rock – engineer, composer, guitars, main personnel, additional vocals
- Kelendria Rowland – composer
- Warwick Saint – photography
- Corey Williams – composer
- Tenitra Williams – composer
- Ed Woods – executive producer
- Brandee Younger – harp, main personnel

== Charts ==
=== Weekly charts ===
Weekly chart performance for Cassie
Chart (2006)	Peak position
Australian Hitseekers Albums (ARIA)	6
Australian Urban Albums (ARIA)	13
Belgian Albums (Ultratop Flanders)	96
Belgian Albums (Ultratop Wallonia)	78
Canadian Albums (Nielsen SoundScan)	29
Dutch Albums (Album Top 100)	78
French Albums (SNEP)	48
German Albums (Offizielle Top 100)	82
Japanese Albums (Oricon)	30
Swiss Albums (Schweizer Hitparade)	57
UK Albums (Official Charts)	33
UK R&B Albums (Official Charts)	3
US Billboard 200	4
US R&B/Hip Hop Albums (Billboard)	2

=== Year-end charts ===
Year-end chart performance for Cassie
Chart (2006)	Position
US R&B/Hip Hop Albums (Billboard)	96

== Certifications and sales ==
Certifications and sales for Cassie
Region	Certification	Certified units/sales
New Zealand (RMNZ)	Platinum	15,000^{‡}
United Kingdom (BPI)	Silver	60,000^{‡}
United States	—	321,000 (Note: Sales of Cassie in the United States as of April 2008.)
Summaries
Worldwide	—	650,000 (Note: Sales of Cassie worldwide as of January 2010.)
^{‡} Sales+streaming figures based on certification alone.

== Release history ==
Release history and formats for Cassie
Region	Date	Format	Label	Ref.
United States	August 8, 2006	CD; digital download	Bad Boy; NextSelection; Atlantic	
United Kingdom	August 28, 2006	CD; digital download	Bad Boy; NextSelection; Atlantic	
Japan	October 11, 2006	CD; digital download	Warner Music Japan	
United Kingdom	July 10, 2015	LP	Be With Records	
