= Ryan Leslie =

American singer and record producer (born 1978)

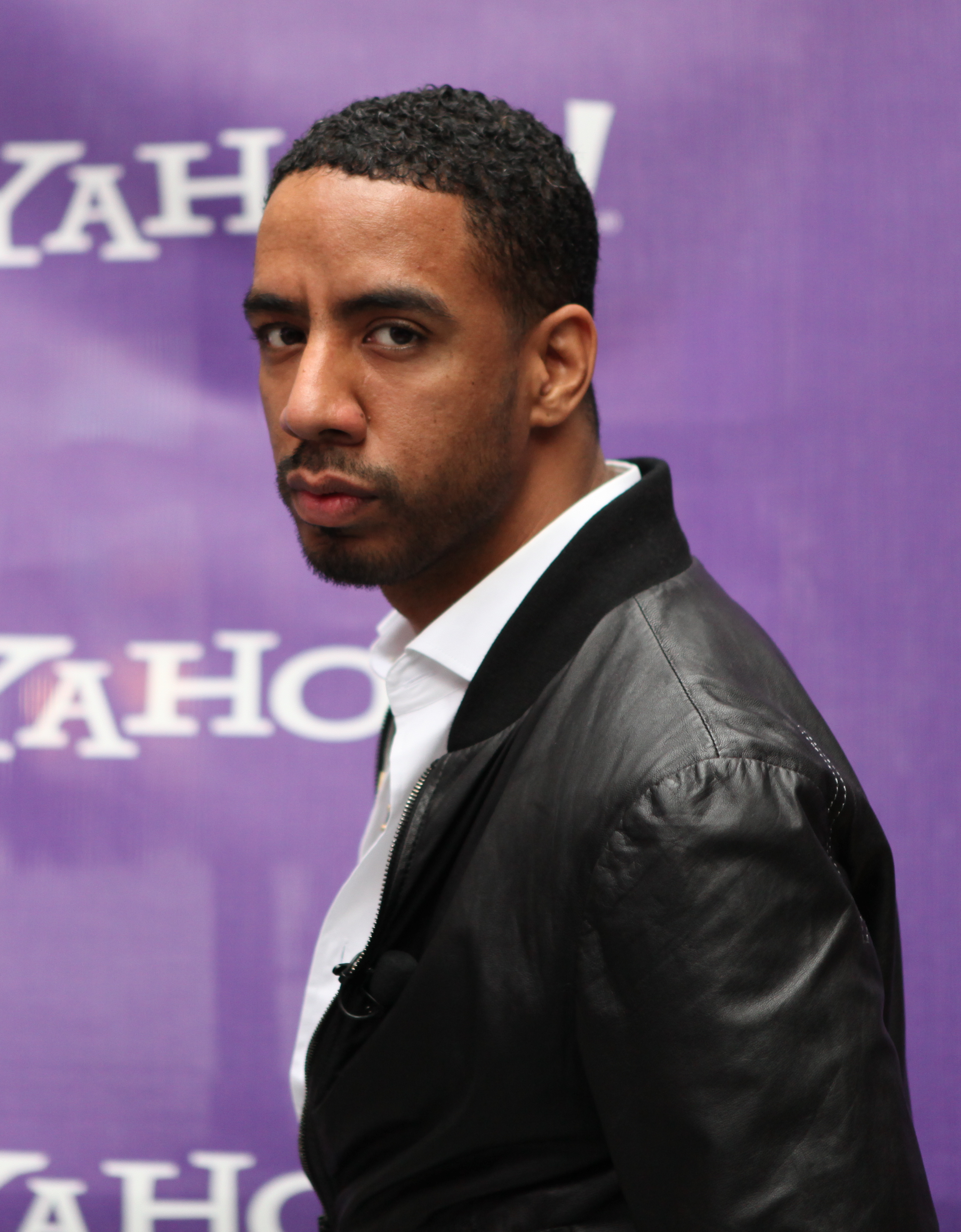
- Leslie in 2007

Background information
- Also known as: Castor Troy
- Born: September 25, 1978 (age 48); Richmond, Virginia, U.S.
- Origin: Boston, Massachusetts, U.S.
- Education: Harvard University (BS)
- Genres: R&B; pop
- Occupations: Singer; songwriter; record producer; businessman
- Works: Discography; production
- Years active: 1997–present
- Labels: Disruptive Multimedia; NextSelection Lifestyle Group; Casablanca; Sony RED; Universal Motown
- Member of: The Hitmen
- Formerly of: The Harvard Krokodiloes
- Website: ryanleslie.com

Signature
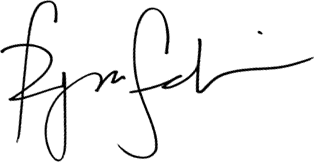

Ryan Leslie (born September 25, 1978) is an American singer, songwriter, record producer, and businessman. Working predominantly in contemporary R&B and hip-hop, he has released six studio albums and written songs for artists including Beyoncé, Britney Spears, Chris Brown, Diddy, Fabolous, LL Cool J, Kanye West and Usher, among others.

Leslie is credited with discovering singer Cassie Ventura in 2004, who signed to his NextSelection record label in a joint-venture with Sean Combs's Bad Boy Records two years later. Leslie wrote and produced her 2006 debut single "Me & U", which peaked at number three on the Billboard Hot 100 and received platinum certification by the Recording Industry Association of America (RIAA); he did so on the entirety of her eponymous debut studio album (2006). In his own recording career, Leslie signed with Universal Motown Records to release his self-titled debut studio album (2009), which was met with moderate critical and commercial reception. It was supported by the singles "Diamond Girl," "Addiction" (featuring Fabolous and Ventura), and "How It Was Supposed to Be," and followed by his second album Transition (2009), which was nominated for Best R&B Album at the 53rd Annual Grammy Awards, and his self-released third album, Les Is More (2012).

Outside of music, Leslie founded the direct text marketing service SuperPhone in 2015.

== Early life and education ==
Leslie was born in Richmond, Virginia, and relocated homes frequently due to his parents' jobs as Salvation Army officers. Leslie graduated from Bear Creek High School in Stockton, California in 1994. He attended Harvard College, graduating at the age of 19 with a degree in government, concentrating in political science and macroeconomics. During Harvard's undergraduate Class Day ceremonies, Leslie was selected to be the Harvard Male Orator, one of four seniors who deliver orations to the graduating senior class.

Leslie grew up around music, playing cornet as a child in the Salvation Army band. He taught himself how to play the piano, along with the ability to recite music, as well as arrange chords to create songs. At Harvard, he joined the Krokodiloes, an a cappella group. Leslie suddenly saw a new future for himself when a friend played him a Stevie Wonder CD freshman year, and began spending time at the on-campus recording studio. While still a college student, Leslie began producing tracks for local Boston artists.

== Music career ==
=== 1997–2003: Career beginnings ===
After graduating college, Leslie urged his parents to allow him to go into the music industry. While living in Boston, Leslie worked community service jobs to help support himself and would spend nights in the recording studio working on his music. Eventually, Leslie moved back home with his parents in Phoenix where he convinced them to take out a $15,000 loan for a production studio so that he could pursue music full-time. In the summer of 2003, Ryan landed a production internship with producer Younglord. Within the first week, Leslie produced the song "Keep Giving Your Love to Me" that would later be performed by Beyoncé for the Bad Boys II soundtrack. The soundtrack was supervised by Sean Combs, who was impressed by Leslie's production style and offered him a management contract upon meeting him.

Under the management of Combs, Leslie worked on various Bad Boy Records projects, including releases from Loon, Cheri Dennis, B5, New Edition and Danity Kane. During that time, Leslie co-produced a record for Britney Spears. Also in 2003, Leslie was introduced by his then attorney Ed Woods to Tommy Mottola. Mottola soon became a mentor of Leslie's and offered him a publishing deal with Aspen Songs and a recording contract with Casablanca, Mottola's imprint distributed by Universal Music Group. Under the mentorship of Mottola and Combs, Leslie signed then-aspiring model Cassie Ventura to his imprint, NextSelection in 2005.

In late 2003, Leslie began recording his debut album, entitled Just Right, and released two singles: "The Way That U Move Girl" and "Used 2 Be" (with Fabolous). The album was never officially released due to creative differences between Leslie and his record label.

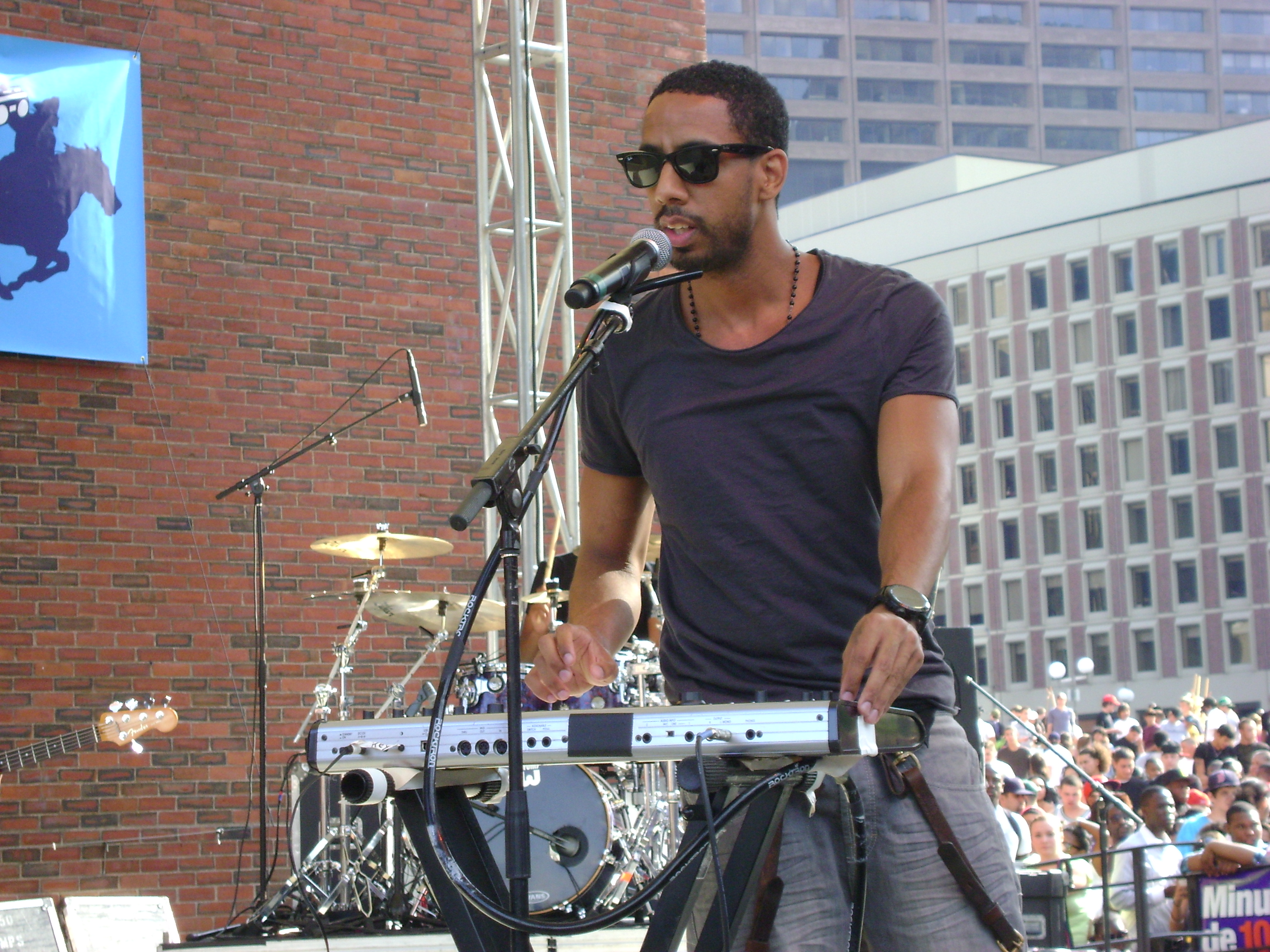
Ryan Leslie performing at the B.U.M.P. Music Festival in Boston in 2010.

=== 2004–2010: Debut album, Transition and leaving label ===
Ryan Leslie returned to the studio in 2006 to record a new debut album. The lead single, "Diamond Girl" was released in December 2007. The video for "Diamond Girl" was premiered on BET's 106 & Park, and released on Leslie's YouTube channel with a special behind-the-scenes clip. In November 2007, he released a video for a song named "I-R-I-N-A" that was produced in-house and released through his YouTube channel as well.

His second single, "Addiction" features Cassie Ventura, with a rap cameo from long-time collaborator, Fabolous. The song was officially released in August 2008.

His third single, "How It Was Supposed to Be" was released with two music videos: a rock version and a military take on the song, which was Leslie's directorial debut and was co-directed by model Tyson Beckford. The single was released March 23, 2009. After many setbacks, his self-titled album, Ryan Leslie, was finally released on February 10, 2009.

Initially, Leslie had a four-album deal with Universal Motown, but he departed the label toward the end of that contract, saying "Universal was interested in reshaping my deal to more of a 360, and they actually made a counter-offer from the initial recording fund," Leslie tells Billboard.com. "At that point I saw that as a window to potentially branch off and try something that was going to be new and dynamic."

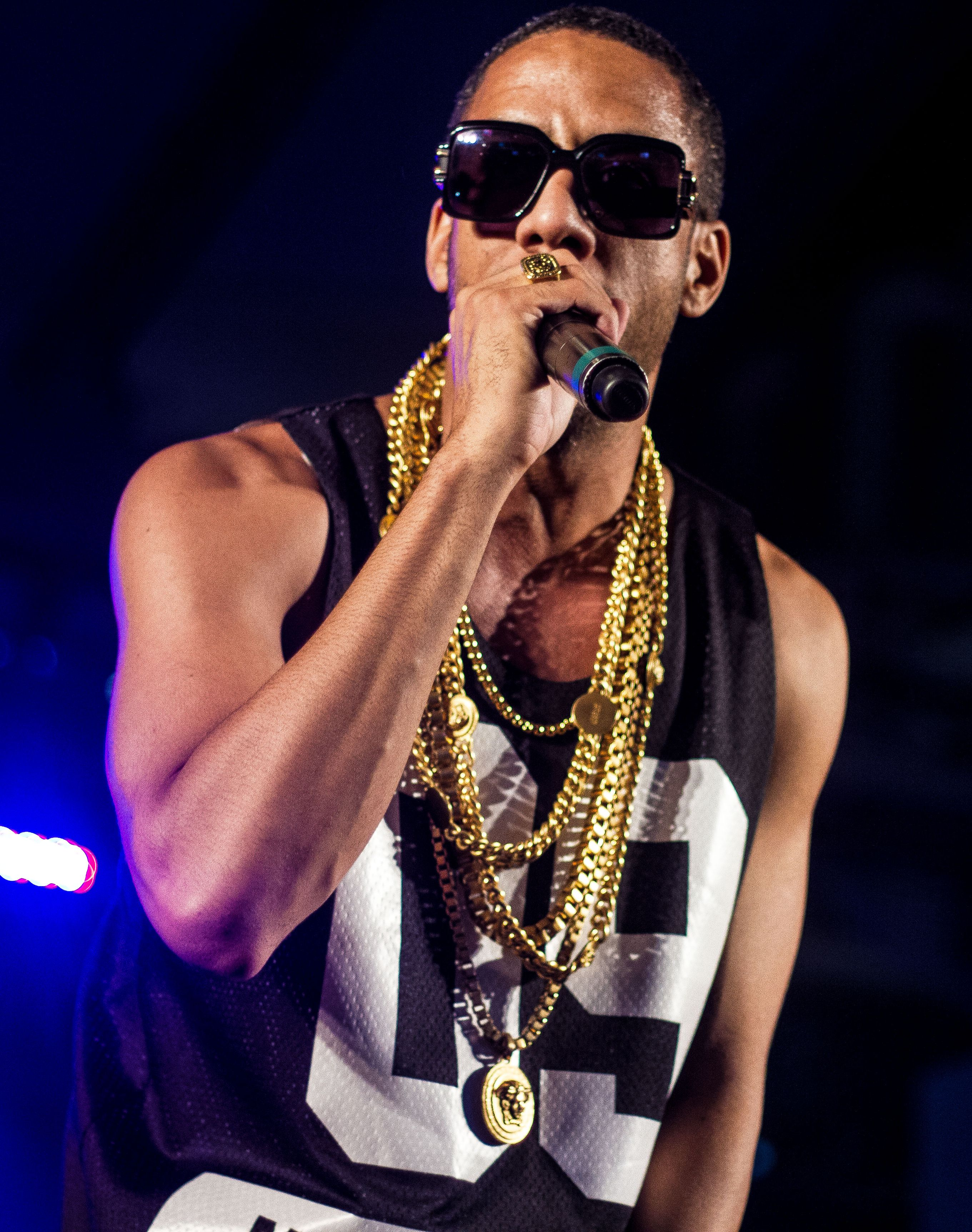
Ryan Leslie performing at the Manifesto 8th Year (2014) in Toronto.

=== 2011–present: Les Is More and Black Mozart ===
Ryan Leslie announced on Twitter and Facebook in January 2011, that his third album would be released July 4, 2011. His first official single from the album released was 'Glory', despite the first singles performed being 'Beautiful Lie' and 'Breathe'. However Leslie would later announce on his website and Twitter account that the album was pushed back for a Fall 2011 release. On October 11, he sent an e-mail to his fanbase saying "I promise 'Les Is More' is just a few weeks away." One year later, in October 2012, Les is More was released. The album features a guest appearance from Fabolous. Another version of "Swiss Francs" (Remix) with French rapper Booba is present on the European album.

He announced in February 2013 that his fourth studio album Black Mozart would be released April 16, 2013. The full album was ultimately released to members of Leslie's #Renegades club on August 31, 2013.

== Other ventures ==
=== NextSelection Lifestyle Group ===
While working as a producer, Leslie went on to create NextSelection Lifestyle Group, his music-media company he founded with online marketing partner Rasheed Richmond. Leslie signed his first artist, Cassie Ventura, in 2005. Under Leslie's guidance, Ventura began working on a debut album preceded by the single "Me & U" (written and produced by Leslie), which spent 20 weeks within the Billboard Hot 100's top 40, where it peaked at number three. Furthermore, it sold over a million digital units and was the 14th most successful song of 2006, according to the Billboard Year-End.

=== SuperPhone ===
After releasing Black Mozart in 2013, the album rollout strategy galvanized him to start SuperPhone, a direct text marketing service. In subsequent months, musicians such as 50 Cent, Raphael Saadiq, and Talib Kweli would use the underlying technology to launch their respective upcoming studio albums and power their own music membership clubs. Kweli spoke about the experience in an interview, "The first thing that appeals to me is the direct contact with the fans and the fact that I receive their e-mails...The second thing is the fact that the money comes directly to me when you buy the album from me. It goes directly to my account. There is nobody taking their cut."

Leslie's work with SuperPhone has been supported by venture capitalists such as Ben Horowitz, journalists such as TechCrunch's Josh Constine, and musicians such as Kanye West. Miley Cyrus, Zayn, Silk Sonic, Ava Max, and Cardi B have employed SuperPhone direct-texting marketing methods.

== Artistry ==
=== Musical influences ===
Leslie has stated that Stevie Wonder is one of the biggest influences on his music. He attributes Michael Jackson, Prince, Jimi Hendrix, James Brown, Quincy Jones, The Beatles, and D'Angelo as musical heroes as well.

=== Online presence ===
Leslie's blog, YouTube channel, MySpace page and Twitter have been the biggest contributors to his fanbase. Leslie often documented his interaction with his audience, including giving away free iPods, backstage passes to his concerts, and invitations to have dinner with him.

Leslie has spoken about the impending rise of digital streaming replacing physical media as a means to consume music. Prior to his 2009 MySpace Release concert, Leslie encouraged aspiring musical artists to utilize digital media while marketing themselves.

=== Legal issues ===
In October 2010, Leslie's laptop was stolen from his Mercedes, while he was on tour in Cologne, Germany. Leslie would offer $20,000, raising it to $1 million reward for the return of it due to his recent productions that it contained. The laptop was returned; however, the intellectual property that Leslie was trying to recover was not present, and Leslie did not feel the reward terms had been met. Armin Augstein, who runs a garage in Pulheim, near Cologne, who returned the laptop was granted the $1 million reward in 2012 after a lawsuit. He was later also made to pay an extra $180,000 in interest for refusing to pay for those two years. Leslie is still in search of the material that was missing.

== Discography ==
- Just Right (2005)
- Ryan Leslie (2009)
- Transition (2009)
- Les Is More (2012)
- Black Mozart (2013)
- MZRT (2015)
- You Know My Speed (2024)

== Awards and nominations ==
- BET Awards
  - 2009, Best Male R&B Artist (nominated)
  - 2009, Best New Artist (nominated)
- Grammy Awards
  - 2011, Best Contemporary R&B Album: Transition (nominated)
- Soul Train Music Awards
  - 2009, Best R&B/Soul or Rap New Artist (nominated)
- Academic Awards
  - 2010, AMBLE Vanguard Award from Harvard University
