= Cassie Ventura discography =

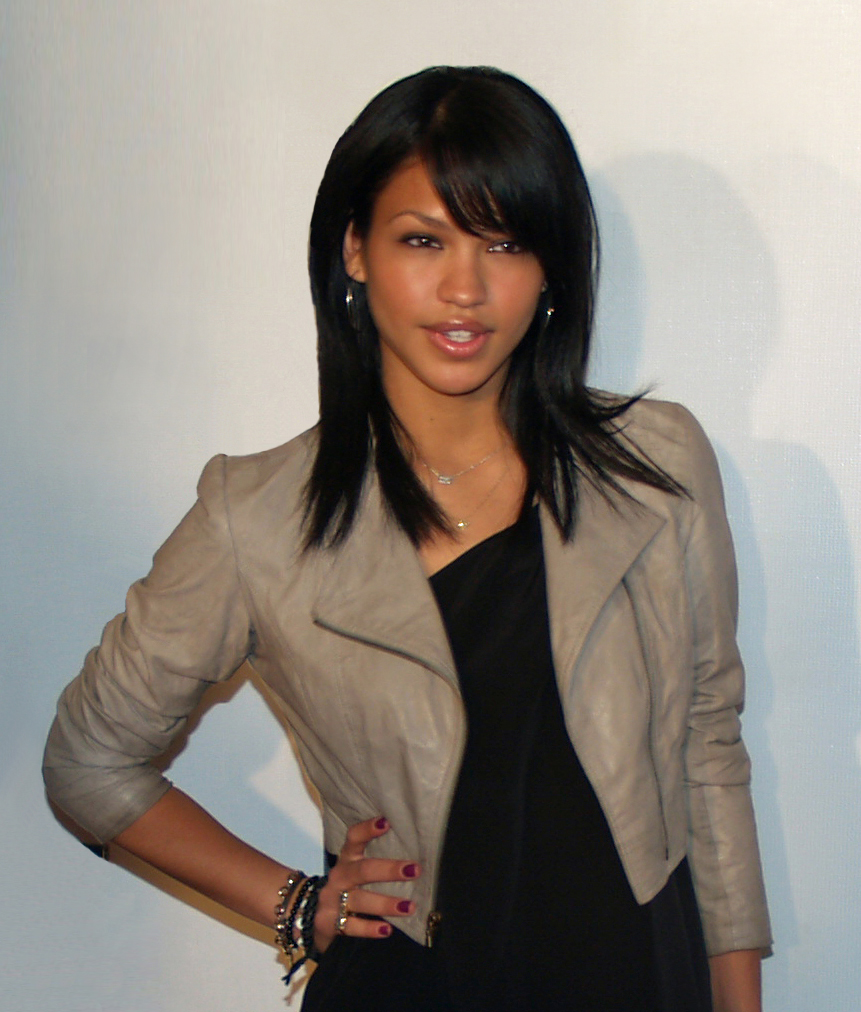
- Cassie in 2007
- Studio albums: 1
- Singles: 25
- Music videos: 11
- Mixtapes: 1
- Promotional singles: 5

American singer Cassie Ventura, known simply as Cassie, has released one studio album, one mixtape, thirteen singles (including three as a featured artist) and eleven music videos. She recorded her first song, "Kiss Me", with Ryan Leslie for her mother's birthday in February 2005. Leslie then signed Ventura to his NextSelection imprint, writing and producing her first single, "Me & U", that same year. The song soon went viral after made available on her MySpace page and became a club hit in Germany. In the meantime, Diddy partnered with Leslie to release Ventura's self-titled debut album Cassie in August 2006, through Bad Boy and Atlantic Records. The album debuted at number four on the US Billboard 200 and charted within the top forty in the UK Albums Chart, where it later received a Silver certification by the British Phonographic Industry. "Me & U" peaked in the top ten of several countries, including number three on the US Billboard Hot 100 and spent seven weeks atop the US Airplay chart, being certified Platinum by the Recording Industry Association of America selling over one million digital downloads. The follow-up "Long Way 2 Go" was the final single of the album and despite less successful in the US, it went on to peak within the top forty of various other countries.

In 2007, Ventura contributed with "Is It You" to the Step Up 2: The Streets soundtrack, also starring in the film. During this time, she was featured on Leslie's single "Addiction" from his debut album. In following years, Ventura released a string of standalone singles that failed to lead a second full-length project, including "Official Girl", featuring Lil Wayne (2008), "Must Be Love", featuring Puff Daddy (2009), and "Let's Get Crazy", featuring Akon (2009), while multiple demo tracks from the project's recording sessions leaked online. In September 2011, she was featured on the Bad Boy Presents: The Preview mixtape with two new songs, "Radio", featuring Fabolous, and "Make You a Believer", featuring Jadakiss, announcing the release of a new single "King of Hearts" the following year, through Interscope Records (later included on the Bad Boy 20th Anniversary Box Set Edition). In 2012, Ventura also released a collaborative track with Nicki Minaj, "The Boys", among guest appearances with other artists, and another promotional single, "Balcony", featuring Young Jeezy, after revealing she was working on a mixtape.

In April 2013, Ventura released her debut mixtape RockaByeBaby to positive reception and critical acclaim, which was preceded by the video premieres of "Numb", featuring Rick Ross, and "Paradise", featuring Wiz Khalifa, while claiming to still be working on her sophomore album simultaneously. Later that year, she contributed with a song, "Indo", to Solange Knowles' record label compilation album Saint Heron. In September 2016, "Joint (No Sleep)" was released as a part of the Honey 3: Dare to Dance soundtrack after Ventura was cast in the film's leading role. In August 2017, she announced signing a joint deal with Epic Records and Bad Boy with the release of a single called "Love a Loser". It was followed by "Don't Play It Safe", produced by Kaytranada and was set to precede a project by the two.

In the summer of 2019, Cassie revealed through social media she would be dropping songs exclusively on streaming platforms throughout a few weeks, dubbed as Free Friday's, which formed a playlist to celebrate the launch of her new independent label Ventura Music. She stated, "#FreeFridays was an exercise in freedom that I hope you all enjoyed and will continue to enjoy."

== Albums ==
=== Studio albums ===
List of studio albums, with selected details, chart positions, sales figures and certifications
Title	Album details	Peak chart positions										Sales	Certifications
Title	Album details	US	US R&B/HH	BEL (WA)	FRA	GER	JPN	NL	SWI	UK	UK R&B	Sales	Certifications
Cassie	Released: August 8, 2006; Label: Bad Boy, NextSelection, Atlantic; Formats: CD, digital download	4	2	78	48	82	30	78	57	33	3	US: 321,000 (Note: Sales of Cassie in the United States as of April 2008.)	BPI: Silver; RMNZ: Platinum

=== Mixtapes ===
List of mixtapes, with selected details
Title	Details
RockaByeBaby	Released: April 11, 2013; Label: Bad Boy; Format: Digital download

== Singles ==
=== As lead artist ===
List of singles as lead artist, with selected chart positions and certifications, showing year released and album name
Title	Year	Peak chart positions										Certifications	Album
Title	Year	US	US R&B/HH	US Rhy.	AUS	CAN	FRA	GER	IRE	NZ	UK	Certifications	Album
"Me & U"	2006	3	1	1	12	— (Note: "Me & U" did not enter the Canadian Singles Chart, but peaked at number six on the Canada CHR/Top 40 chart.)	8	12	9	4	6	RIAA: Platinum; BPI: 2× Platinum; BVMI: Gold; MC: Gold; RMNZ: 3× Platinum	Cassie
"Long Way 2 Go"	2006	97	— (Note: "Long Way 2 Go" did not enter the Billboard Hot R&B/Hip-Hop Songs, but peaked at number 15 on the Bubbling Under R&B/Hip-Hop Singles chart.)	29	23	—	21	43	14	17	12	BPI: Platinum; RMNZ: 2× Platinum	Cassie
"Is It You"	2007	—	—	—	— (Note: "Is It You" did not enter the ARIA Australian Top 50 Singles Chart, but peaked at number 49 on the ARIA Digital Track Chart.)	85	—	—	—	—	52		Step Up 2: The Streets
"Official Girl" (featuring Lil Wayne)	2008	— (Note: "Official Girl" did not enter the Billboard Hot 100, but peaked at number one on the Hot Videoclip Tracks chart.)	—	—	—	—	—	—	—	—	—		Non-album singles
"Must Be Love" (featuring Puff Daddy)	2009	—	56	—	—	—	—	—	—	—	—		Non-album singles
"Let's Get Crazy" (featuring Akon)	2009	—	—	33	—	—	—	—	—	—	—		Non-album singles
"King of Hearts"	2012	—	—	39	—	—	—	—	—	—	—		Bad Boy 20th Anniversary
"The Boys" (with Nicki Minaj)	2012	— (Note: "The Boys" did not enter the Billboard Hot 100, but peaked at number 14 on the Bubbling Under Hot 100 Singles chart.)	41	—	—	—	—	—	95	—	101		Pink Friday: Roman Reloaded – The Re-Up
"Love a Loser" (featuring G-Eazy)	2017	—	— (Note: "Love a Loser" did not enter the Billboard Hot R&B/Hip-Hop Songs, but peaked at number 23 on the R&B/Hip-Hop Digital Songs chart.)	—	—	—	—	—	—	—	—		Non-album singles
"Don't Play It Safe"	2017	—	—	—	—	—	—	—	—	—	—		Non-album singles
"—" denotes a recording that did not chart or was not released in that territory.

=== As featured artist ===
List of singles as featured artist, with selected chart positions, showing year released and album name
Title	Year	Peak chart positions										Album
Title	Year	US	US R&B/HH	AUS	CAN	FRA	GER	NL	NZ	SWI	UK	Album
"Addiction" (Ryan Leslie featuring Cassie and Fabolous)	2008	— (Note: "Addiction" did not enter the Billboard Hot 100, but peaked at number 15 on the Bubbling Under Hot 100 Singles chart.)	35	—	—	—	—	—	—	—	—	Ryan Leslie
"#Wheresthelove" (The Black Eyed Peas featuring Cassie as part of the World)	2016	— (Note: "#Wheresthelove" did not enter the Billboard Hot 100, but peaked at number 39 on the Digital Songs chart.)	—	15	— (Note: "#Wheresthelove" did not enter the Canadian Hot 100, but peaked at number 21 on the Canadian Digital Songs chart.)	26	39	— (Note: "#Wheresthelove" did not enter the Dutch Top 40, but peaked at number 28 on the Dutch Top 40 Tipparade.)	— (Note: "#Wheresthelove" did not enter the NZ Top 40 Singles Chart, but peaked at number 3 on the NZ Heatseekers Singles Chart.)	41	47	Non-album singles
"Obvious" (Eden Prince featuring Cassie)	2017	—	—	—	—	—	—	—	—	—	—	Non-album singles
"—" denotes a recording that did not chart or was not released in that territory.

=== Promotional singles ===
List of promotional singles, showing year released and album name
Title	Year	Album
"Sound of Love" (DJ Komori featuring Cassie)	2011	The Exclusives R&B Hits Vol.4
"Make You a Believer" (featuring Jadakiss)	2011	Bad Boy Presents: The Preview
"Radio" (featuring Fabolous)	2011	Bad Boy Presents: The Preview
"Babygirl" (N.O.R.E. featuring Cassie)	2012	Crack on Steroids
"Balcony" (featuring Young Jeezy)	2012	Non-album single
"Moments" (featuring The Code)	2019	Free Friday's Playlist (Note: The songs were available on streaming platforms as a playlist and were not released for sale.)
"Excuses"	2019	Free Friday's Playlist
"Hungover"	2019	Free Friday's Playlist
"Don't Let Go"	2019	Free Friday's Playlist
"Speaking Of"	2019	Free Friday's Playlist
"Rollercoaster" (featuring Ro James)	2019	Free Friday's Playlist
"Teach Me"	2019	Free Friday's Playlist
"Simple Things"	2019	Free Friday's Playlist

== Guest appearances ==
List of guest appearances, with other performing artists, showing year released and album name
Title	Year	Other artist(s)	Album	Ref.
"Roc Boys (And the Winner Is)..." (Note: Credited with additional and/or background vocals.)	2007	Jay-Z	American Gangster	
"Sweet"	2007	Jay-Z	American Gangster	
"Swagga Like Puff"	2008	Diddy	None	
"Chloe Jones" (Skit)	2009	Chester French	Jacques Jams, Vol. 1: Endurance	
"Venus vs. Mars"	2009	Jay-Z	The Blueprint 3	
"Repercaution"	2010	Diddy – Dirty Money	Last Train to Paris: Prelude	
"Shades"	2010	Diddy – Dirty Money	Last Train to Paris: Prelude	
"Coming Home"	2010	Diddy – Dirty Money, Skylar Grey	Last Train to Paris	
"Sex, Drugs, & Rock-N-Roll"	2011	Planet VI	The American Dream	
"Warning Shot"	2012	Machine Gun Kelly	Half Naked & Almost Famous	
"Fly with U"	2012	Far East Movement	Dirty Bass	
"I'm Not Drunk" (Interlude)	2012	Colin Munroe	Unsung Hero	
"Not Love" (Interlude)	2012	Colin Munroe	Unsung Hero	
"Diced Pineapples"	2012	Fabolous, Trey Songz	The S.O.U.L. Tape 2	
"Weak"	2013	Los, Wiz Khalifa	Becoming King	
"Hit It"	2013	Jonte', Dai Burger	Dirty Werk	
"In the Mood"	2013	LoLa Monroe	Lipstick and Pistols	
"Indo"	2013	None	Saint Heron	
"Joint (No Sleep)"	2016	None	Honey 3: Dare to Dance	
"SDP Interlude"	2016	Travis Scott	Birds in the Trap Sing McKnight	
"Lose"	2016	Travis Scott	Birds in the Trap Sing McKnight	
"Muse / About Ava"	2018	The Code	Paramount	
"Big Shoes" (Remix)	2018	Empire Cast, Yazz	Empire Original Soundtrack Season 4	
"Way to the Show"	2019	Solange	When I Get Home	
"Time"	2021	Black Coffee	Subconsciously	
"Universal Love"	2022	The Game, Chris Brown, Chlöe	Drillmatic – Heart vs. Mind	

== Music videos ==
List of music videos, showing year released, other artists and directors
Title	Year	Other artist(s)	Director(s)	Ref.
As lead artist
"Me & U"	2006	None	Ray Kay	
"Me & U"	2006	None	Little X (Note: Little X's video version was not officially released.)	
"Long Way 2 Go"	2006	None	Erik White	
"Is It You"	2008	None	Jon M. Chu	
"Official Girl"	2008	Lil Wayne	Chris Robinson	
"Must Be Love"	2009	Puff Daddy	Bernard Gourley	
"King of Hearts"	2012	None	Christopher Sims	
"King of Hearts" (R3hab Remix)	2012	None	Julien Bachelet	
"The Boys"	2012	Nicki Minaj	Colin Tilley	
"Numb"	2013	Rick Ross	Alex Nazari	
"Paradise"	2013	Wiz Khalifa	Alex Nazari	
"I Know What You Want"	2013	None	Chris Latouche, Jay-Ohh	
"I Love It"	2013	Fabolous	Chris Latouche	
"Love a Loser"	2017	G-Eazy	Harrison Boyce	
"Don't Play It Safe"	2018	None	Life Garland	
Guest appearances
"Just a Friend 2002"	2002	Mario	Diane Martel	
"Here I Go Again"	2005	Mario	Ray Kay	
"Stronger"	2007	Kanye West	Hype Williams	
"Roc Boys (And the Winner Is)..."	2007	Jay-Z	Chris Robinson	
"Crawl"	2009	Chris Brown	Joseph Kahn	
"Ciroc Star"	2010	Chester French, Diddy, Jadakiss, Clinton Sparks	Spiff TV	
"B.M.F. (Blowin' Money Fast)"	2010	Rick Ross, Styles P	Parris	
"Roll Up"	2011	Wiz Khalifa	Jake Davis	
"Shot Caller" (Remix)	2012	French Montana, Diddy, Rick Ross, Charlie Rock	Colin Tilley	
"I'm a Coke Boy" (Remix)	2013	Chinx Drugz, Rick Ross, French Montana, Diddy	Spiff TV	
"I Don't Belong to You"	2015	Keke Palmer	Mia Swier, Jim Swaffield	
"#Wheresthelove"	2016	The Black Eyed Peas, The World	Michael Jurkovac	
"Corazon"	2022	Ilham, French Montana	Karrueche Tran, Robert Hanaford	
"Psychic"	2023	Chris Brown, Jack Harlow	Cameron Dean	
