= RockaByeBaby =

Mixtape by Cassie
- Released: April 11, 2013
- Recorded: 2012–13
- Genres: Hip hop; R&B
- Length: 37:17
- Labels: Bad Boy; Interscope
- Producers: Mike Will Made It; Da Internz; Magnificent; Knotch; BJONES!; Noel Cadastre; The Fr3shmen; THC; Sounwave; Terrace Martin; Young Chop; David D.A. Doman; Aubry Delaine; Soundz

Cassie chronology
Cassie (2006)	RockaByeBaby (2013)

RockaByeBaby is the first mixtape by American singer Cassie, released on April 11, 2013, by Bad Boy Records. It was her first full-length project released since her self-titled debut studio album Cassie (2006). Following the premiere of the track "King of Hearts" in February 2012, which was initially announced as the lead single from her upcoming second studio album, Cassie announced that she would be releasing a mixtape. The mixtape's concept is based on the 1991 film New Jack City.

RockaByeBaby marked Cassie's first body of work to include a diverse roster of collaborators including musical guests Meek Mill, French Montana, Jeremih, Fabolous, Rick Ross, Pusha T, Ester Dean, Wiz Khalifa, and Too $hort, as well as writer James Fauntleroy. Recording and production sessions for the mixtape took place with producers Rob Holladay, Da Internz, Knotch, Noel Cadastre, The Fr3shmen, Soundz, Magnificent, BJONES!, Mike Will Made It, Young Chop, David D.A. Doman, THC, Sounwave and Terrace Martin, with Cassie, Sean "Diddy" Combs, Matthew "Matty Rich" Testa and Holladay serving as executive producers.

RockaByeBaby received positive reviews from music critics, who praised Cassie's vocal performances and complimented its production and the mixtape features, with some calling it "hip-hop's streetest spitters." On April 2, 2013, "Numb" featuring American rapper Rick Ross was released online alongside its accompanying music video. "Paradise," featuring rapper Wiz Khalifa, premiered the following week on BET's 106 & Park.

== Background and development ==
After being spotted frequently in late 2004 at clubs and parties by music producer Ryan Leslie, the two worked together and wrote a duet called "Kiss Me" in 2005 and, after recording the track, Leslie played the song for music executive Tommy Mottola. After hearing "Kiss Me," Mottola offered Cassie a management deal, with Leslie also signing her to NextSelection Lifestyle Group, his music-media company he had founded with online marketing partner Rasheed Richmond. Leslie then wrote and produced Cassie's first single, "Me & U", also in 2005. The song became a successful club song in Germany. During this time, Diddy heard "Me & U," and Leslie convinced him to partner his Bad Boy Records with NextSelection imprint for the release of Cassie's debut album, produced entirely by Leslie.

After signing the record deal in 2006, Cassie released her self-titled debut album Cassie, which was released on August 8, 2006. Its lead single, "Me & U," peaked at number three on the Billboard Hot 100, selling more than 1 million digital downloads. In 2007, Cassie began work on her second studio album, and released a string of singles intended for the project; "Official Girl," featuring Lil Wayne, in August 2008, "Must Be Love," featuring Diddy, in April 2009, and "Let's Get Crazy," featuring Akon, in August 2009. In December 2009, it was announced that Cassie had signed a new deal with Interscope Records. Cassie then released yet another single from her planned sophomore album, "King of Hearts", in the United States on February 14, 2012, along with the official music video.

== Title, concept and artwork ==
Puff helped me come up with the concept of it being RockaByeBaby being based on New Jack City, like how do we want to make this an idea and a concept without forcing it on people and making it something cheesy.

— Cassie speaking on the mixtape's concept.

Sean Combs helped Cassie come up with concept of the mixtape being based on the crime film New Jack City (1991). It was based on the character Keisha from the film New Jack City played by Vanessa A. Williams, during an interview Cassie spoke on this decision saying, "At first when we came up with the concept of RockaByeBaby it was loosely based on New Jack City and Keisha in New Jack City, who was sent to do the dirty work for the guys in the film. RockaByeBaby is really based on Keisha and her just no-bullshit attitude and I wanted it to be a reflection of a different side of my personality that people haven't really gotten to experience yet. It’s just a tougher side of my personality." The mixtape's official artwork was revealed through both Cassie's official Twitter and Instagram accounts on the day of its release. The cover consists of Cassie appearing with a gold "smoking gun", gold necklace, earrings, rings and gold lipstick. Cassie described the artwork as her "tougher" side of her personality which has an "attitude".

== Composition ==
Speaking on the mixtape's genre Cassie described, "It's not pop, it's not R&B, it's Cassie." Furthermore, Cassie said, "My goal was to make a tape that you could vibe to and that people could enjoy from the beginning until the end. I want this to be what you listen to when you need to escape." "Paradise" is a "Slow-bubbling minimalist" song and has an "old-school vibe", it features American rapper Wiz Khalifa, is produced by Da Internz and written by James Fauntleroy. "Numb" featuring Rick Ross was described by Idolator as being "haunting and eerie and minimalist and a little bit trippy." "Sound of Love" featuring American singer Jeremih is a "slow jam" that last for a duration of four minutes sixteen seconds. "Sound of Love" was written by The Real Knotch and produced by the latter and Rob Holladay. "Turn Up" features rapper Meek Mill produced by Young Chop, "Turn Up" is "sinister synthscape" song. The song "I Know What You Want" utilises the instrumental from "m.A.A.d City" by Kendrick Lamar and "Do My Dance" the instrumental of the song of the same name by Tyga.

== Release ==
In July 2012, Cassie announced in a letter to her fans that she has been working simultaneously on her album and a new mixtape entitled "Rock-A-Bye Baby", which will be released on April 11, 2013. The mixtape will be released online through various media outlets.

On March 12, 2013, Cassie revealed a photo via her official Instagram, the photo consisted of Cassie and armed men as well as the mixtape's official release date "April 11, 2013." On March 20, 2013, Cassie released a trailer in support of the mixtape, The clip features footage of a shooting scene from New Jack City, where she got the title from. Cassie is seen walking down a dark road and blows smoke into the camera, while a vehicle drives by. During an interview Cassie described the mixtape and why she released it saying “This mixtape is about more than just music, it’s about the art, the visuals and the people,” continuing to say “I wanted to release RockaByeBaby to show my appreciation to the supporters that have been there from day one and always believed in me and my art.” on April 8, 2013, Cassie held a "listening party" in which fans could meet and greet her.

On April 11, 2013, RockaByeBaby was released as a free digital download exclusively on online mixtape distribution platform DatPiff. RockaByeBaby has so far been downloaded 690,000 times.

== Promotion ==
On December 17, 2012, a new Cassie song "End Of The Line" surfaced online along with its video, it contained "string-and-piano melody" and was produced by Knotch. On January 24, 2013, Cassie released a remix of Trinidad James single "All Gold Everything" entitled "All Gold, All Girls," featuring American rappers Trina and LoLa Monroe, to announce the upcoming release of the mixtape. Neither of the two latter songs were featured on the mixtape's final track listing.

On March 26, 2013, Cassie released a trailer for "Numb" featuring American rapper Rick Ross, which is featured on the mixtape. The video for the song was released on April 2, 2013, and directed by Alex Nazari. The video depicts Cassie walking down Hollywood Boulevard, on the beach at sunset, and on a dark road at night.

On March 21, 2013, Cassie shot the video in Los Angeles for the mixtape's song "Paradise" which features American rapper Wiz Khalifa, the video featured a cameo appearance from model Karrueche Tran. On April 5, 2013, via her official Twitter and Vimeo accounts, Cassie released a trailer for the song "Paradise" directed by Alex Nazari. The video sees Cassie and Khalifa with "friends" on a porch and her driving a in an "old school" Chevrolet. On April 9, 2013, the video for "Paradise" premiered on BET 106 & Park.

A behind the scenes video for the song "I Love It," featuring rapper Fabolous, premiered online on May 20, 2013. The music video, directed by Chris Latouche and filmed in an underground club, ended up not getting a release. On September 5, 2013, Cassie released a video for the track "I Know What You Want," directed by Christopher LaTouche and JayOhh. The video depicts Cassie ridding a BMX bike in Rodeo Drive and pouring Ciroc on two men with illustrations by Eric-Shabazz Larkin.

== Critical reception ==
Professional ratings
Review scores
Source	Rating
BET	4/5 stars
MuuMuse	4/5 stars
Pitchfork Media	7.8/10
The 405	7.5/10
The Drop	8/10

RockaByeBaby received critical acclaim, with critics commending Cassie's versatility and confidence crafting a cohesive and polished body of work. Noisey's Ezra Marcus praised the mixtape calling it "so evocative and abundant," with "supple, diamond-tipped production" that "mercifully avoids any hint of EDM," continuing to laud Cassie's vocals: "over the last seven years, Cassie's become something of a religion—a lost deity for those of us captivated by her voice's singularly devastating confluence of innocence and experience." Miles Raymer of Pitchfork detailed the cult following Cassie's debut album had inspired, noting that she "had yet to release its proper follow-up," adding, "even if it never comes, RockaByeBaby, the mixtape she’s released to hold us over until then, would more than suffice." Raymer then drew comparisons between the project and, not only to "risk-taking" R&B singers Jeremih and the Weeknd, but also "melody-intensive" rappers Drake and Future, concluding: "Cassie fans have spent a long, long time waiting for the rest of the world to start paying attention to her. After RockaByeBaby I can't imagine they'll be able to ignore her for much longer." Dummy Mag echoed a similar sentiment, describing it "an entertaining listen" with "an impressive bill." Bradley Stern of MuuMuse found the record to be "a much more aggressive experience than anything she’s ever done." PrettyMuchAmazing posted on their website, "While the best songs on the mixtape play on the vaporous alt r&b tropes that are en vogue right now, Cassie's uniquely uninterested – if not flat-out bored – vocal delivery somehow keep things interesting."

BET's Jacob Rohn opined, "Cassie reinvents herself, singing, rapping and showing a much more risqué side. With her maturity in pocket, an all-star roster of features (risqué experts included) and production reminiscent of that early 2000s Timbaland sound," commenting that her best verse is featured on the track "Numb," and finalizing, "it's easily good enough to be an official album." Marc Hogan of Spin wrote that the mixtape offers both "Cassie's icy digital soul and her no-holds-barred vision of hip-hop — and on early listens it’s thrillingly audacious." Writing for The 405, Tom Baker picked "Sound of Love" as the stand-out song, writing that "her delivery has a real flow" and expressed that "even when she's playing the part of the gangsta's moll this is Cassie's show," and she "has a magnetism that explain why people are still so eager to listen to anything she touches, and for the most part this could serve as a solid – if different – follow-up to her first album." Dimas Sanfiorenzo of Global Grind complimented the mixtape's "dark music," as well as the use of "clips from New Jack City intertwined throughout the project," calling the featured rappers "hip-hop's streetest spitters." In the opinion of The Washington Post's Allison Stewart, the mixtape "feels like the work of a returning heroine stooping to conquer: It’s twitchy and raunchy, begrudging and spare." Zcamp of Tiny Mix Tapes described it as "an out-of-nowhere pop juggernaut that's entirely unlike anything we've heard from Cassie thus far," elaborating, "Yeah, Cassie's gone American Gangster on us, and it sounds damn good: a schooling in the methodologies of pop/rap/R&B fusion, backed up by a reputable roster of guest stars."

VIBE Vixen received the mixtape positively claiming its "new sound's giving us chills," with writer Jaz Cuevas stating that the singer is "serving up a raw, laid back vibe, and it's obvious that Cassie is making music that is true to herself," listing "that sexy, sultry, low voice that made us fall in love with Cassie from the jump (cue "Me & U")" and the accompanying collaborations and visuals as some of its positive aspects. Singersroom.com applauded the body of work for its "aggressive sound" and Cassie's "edgier side," saying that she "rocks out on every track with her soft voice, but with the bravado of a female rapper." At HNHH, Rose Lilah mentions it is "a nice addition to the impressive catalogue Cassie has been building over the years," while Dhruva Balram declared RockaByeBaby to set "an example of how an infusion of R&B and hip-hop can work" and Cassie showcasing "her ability to not just sing but mix in rhymes with her vocals," suggesting it "heightens the expectation for the singer's actual album." Despite the project boasting several featured artists unlike 2006's Cassie, Interview's Marcus Holmlund felt "it stays true to her now-lauded transient affect: only amplifying her aggression lyrically while sticking to her atmospheric vocal style." In a review for The Quietus, Gary Suarez said "RockaByeBaby features an ultramodernity that Cassie's contemporaries continue to struggle with."

=== Accolades ===
RockaByeBaby was named mixtape of the week by Stereogum's Tom Breihan, who also remarked it could've been released as a proper album, likening the "same sinister, debauched chill to it" as the Weeknd's House of Balloons: "Cassie's got that same predatory, almost threatening sexuality in her voice, but she sounds in control in ways that Abel Tesfaye rarely does," praising her voice and stating all the featured rappers brought "their A-game" with the project still sounding "like it belongs entirely to her, like it’s being beamed directly from a world of her creation." The mixtape was then placed at number forty-three on the same publication's 50 Best Albums of 2013 list, observing "she succeeds like no R&B singer since Aaliyah." It was picked as one of Fact's 20 Best Mixtapes of 2013, who dub Cassie as the "Ice Princess of R&B," and call it the publication's "most anticipated mixtape of 2013" serving as a "lean, straight-to-the point reminder of why we actually care about Cassie Ventura so much," and ranked at number eleven on Centric's "13 Best R&B/Soul Mixtapes & EPs of 2013" year-end list. The Fader referred to Cassie as "the pioneer of R&B vaporware" and listed the extended edit of the mixtape track "All My Love" by producer Kingdom as one of the most underrated songs of 2013. The mixtape appeared on Idolator's "10 Favorite EPs/Mixtapes Of The Year," and at number fifty-six on eMusic's 100 Best Albums of 2013. RockaByeBaby was also rated the best mixtape of the year by Dazed, calling Cassie "the ultimate contemporary R&B dreamgirl."

== Track listing ==
No.	Title	Writer(s)	Producer(s)	Length
1.	"Intro"			0:15
2.	"Paradise" (featuring Wiz Khalifa)	James Fauntleroy; Cameron Thomaz	Da Internz; Rob Holladay	3:57
3.	"Take Care of Me Baby" (featuring Pusha T)	Terrence Thornton; Fauntleroy	Mike Will Made It; Rob Holladay	3:05
4.	"Addiction" (featuring French Montana)	Karim Kharbouch; J-Doe	Rob Holladay; Magnificent; Knotch; BJONES!	3:38
5.	"Numb" (featuring Rick Ross)	William Roberts; Jasmine Nicole Spence	Track King Cole	3:58
6.	"Sound of Love" (featuring Jeremih)	Jeremih Felton; Knotch	Knotch; Rob Holladay	4:16
7.	"I Love It" (featuring Fabolous)	Felton; John Jackson	The Fr3shmen; Rob Holladay	3:26
8.	"RockaByeBaby"	Carlos Coleman; Michaela Shiloh	Rob Holladay; Magnificent	2:30
9.	"I Know What You Want"	Fauntleroy	THC; Sounwave; Terrace Martin	2:21
10.	"Turn Up" (featuring Meek Mill)	Christian Ward; Shiloh; Robert Williams	Young Chop	2:33
11.	"Do My Dance" (featuring Too Short)	Felton; Todd Shaw	David D.A. Doman	2:29
12.	"Bad Bitches" (featuring Ester Dean)	Ester Dean	Aubry Delaine	2:55
13.	"All My Love"	Felton	Soundz	1:54
Total length:				37:17

Sample credits

Information adapted from WhoSampled.

- "Paradise" contains a sample of "Bang Bang Bang" by Mindless Behavior.
- "Take Care of Me Baby" contains a sample of "Got One" by 2 Chainz.
- "I Know What You Want" contains a sample of "m.A.A.d city" by Kendrick Lamar.
- "Do My Dance" contains a sample of "Do My Dance" by Tyga featuring 2 Chainz.

== Credits and personnel ==
Credits adapted from the liner notes of RockaByeBaby.

- BJONES! – producer
- Noel Cadastre – producer
- Cassie – primary artist, executive producer, vocals, styling
- Sean "Diddy" Combs – executive producer
- James Cruz – management
- Da Internz – producer
- Ester Dean – featured artist, vocals, composer
- Aubry Delaine – producer
- David D.A. Doman – producer
- Neil Dominique – A&R, production coordinator
- Fabolous – featured artist, vocals, composer
- James Fauntleroy II – composer
- Steven Gomillion and Dennis Leupold – photography
- Rob Holladay – executive producer, producer
- J-Doe – composer
- Jeremih – featured artist, vocals, composer
- Wiz Khalifa – featured artist, vocals, composer
- Knotch – producer, composer
- Christopher "Video Chris" LaTouche – viral video content
- Los – composer
- Magnificent – producer
- Terrace Martin – producer
- Mike Will Made It – producer
- Meek Mill – featured artist, vocals, composer
- French Montana – featured artist, vocals, composer
- Chaz Morgan – art direction, design
- Deonte Nash – styling
- Pusha T – featured artist, vocals, composer
- Derek Roche – styling
- Rick Ross – featured artist, vocals, composer
- Michaela Shiloh – composer
- Soundz – producer
- Sounwave – producer
- Jasmine Nicole Spence – composer
- THC – producer
- Matthew "Matty Rich" Testa – executive producer, engineer, mixing
- The Fr3shmen – producer
- Too Short – featured artist, vocals, composer
- Young Chop – producer
- Yung Berg – composer
