= Let's Get Crazy =

Let's Get Crazy may refer to:

- "Let's Get Crazy" (Cassie song)
- "Let's Get Crazy" (Hannah Montana song)
- "Let's Get Crazy", a song by Quiet Riot from Metal Health
- "Let's Get Crazy", a song by White Lion from Big Game

== See also ==
- "Let's Go Crazy", a song by Prince and The Revolution
- "Let's Go Crazy", a song by The Clash from Sandinista!
- Get Crazy, a 1983 film directed by Allan Arkush
