= Alex Fine =

American actor (born 1993)

- Born: March 12, 1993 (age 33); Cincinnati, Ohio, U.S.
- Education: Central Michigan University
- Occupations: Actor; producer; fitness entrepreneur
- Years active: 2015–present
- Spouse: Cassie Ventura (m. 2019)
- Children: 3

Alex Fine (born March 12, 1993) is an American fitness entrepreneur and actor. He has had recurring roles in the American Western drama miniseries 1883 (2021) and American Primeval (2025) as well as the British crime drama series MobLand (2025).

== Early life and education ==
Fine was born in Cincinnati, and raised in Lake Orion, Michigan. He graduated from Lake Orion High School in 2011. Fine played college football as a defensive back at Central Michigan University from 2012 to 2014, where he studied entrepreneurship. Inspired by the transformation of actor Bradley Cooper in American Sniper, he pursued a career in fitness, reaching out to media personality and trainer C.T. Fletcher. He moved to Los Angeles shortly before graduating to begin working under Fletcher's mentorship.

== Career ==
In 2015, Fine founded Alex Fine Performance, a personal training brand which quickly gained popularity and began catering to high-profile clients including Jennifer Aniston, Odell Beckham Jr., and members of the Riverdale series cast. He later rebranded the company as Almost Home, expanding into wellness services through a fitness app offering workouts, nutrition plans and other motivational content. Fine was also affiliated with the Unbreakable Performance Center in Los Angeles. During this period, he trained to become a professional bull rider. He walked the runway at fashion shows including Paris Fashion Week, where he modeled for KidSuper in 2022 and Louis-Gabriel Nouchi in 2024.

In 2021, Fine ventured into acting, appearing in the Western drama miniseries 1883, a prequel to Taylor Sheridan's Yellowstone. In 2023, he was cast in the independent horror thriller film The Resurrection of Charles Manson which starred Frank Grillo. He stated that he used his fitness background to build a steady career that supported his pursuit of acting, which he began studying at the Royal Academy of Dramatic Art in London, taking weekly lessons in ballet, gun and close combat training, and dialect in the following years. In 2025, he starred in recurring roles in the Western drama miniseries American Primeval as Gant and the crime drama series MobLand as Donnie, an adversary of Tom Hardy's character Harry.

== Personal life ==
Fine married singer Cassie Ventura in August 2019. The couple have two daughters, born December 2019 and March 2021, and a son, born May 2025.

Fine has supported organizations such as the Compton Cowboys and Haven Homes of Detroit. His advocacy work often draws from personal experience, including his mother's history as a domestic abuse survivor. Fine has also publicly supported Ventura during her legal battle against Sean Combs, condemned violence against women, and participated in awareness efforts, including a 50-mile marathon in 2019.

== Filmography ==
=== Film ===
Year	Title	Role	Ref.			
Year	Title	Role	Ref.	2023	The Resurrection of Charles Manson	Travis
TBA	Breathe Deep	Valentine				

=== Television ===
Year	Title	Role	Notes	Ref.				
Year	Title	Role	Notes	Ref.	2020	Iron Sharpens Iron	—N/a	Executive producer
2021	1883	Grady	2 episodes					
2025	American Primeval	Gant	6 episodes					
2025–2026	MobLand	Donnie	9 episodes					
