= Cassie Ventura =

American singer, dancer, actress, and model (born 1986)

Cassie
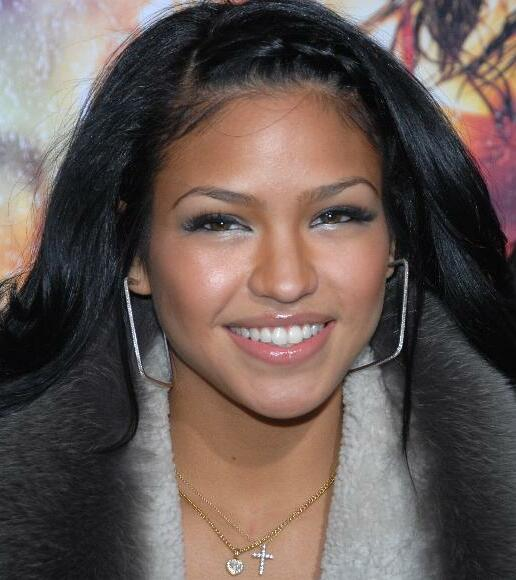
- Cassie in 2008
- Born: Casandra Elizabeth Ventura; August 26, 1986 (age 40); New London, Connecticut, U.S.
- Occupations: Singer; dancer; actress; model
- Years active: 2004–present
- Works: Discography
- Spouse: Alex Fine (m. 2019)
- Partner: Sean Combs (2007–2018)
- Children: 3
- Musical career
- Genres: R&B; pop; hip-hop
- Labels: Empire; NextSelection; Bad Boy; Interscope

Casandra Elizabeth Ventura (/vɛnˈtʊrə/ ven-TUU-rə; born August 26, 1986) known mononymously as Cassie, is an American singer, dancer, actress, and model. Born in New London, Connecticut, she began her musical career in 2004 after meeting producer Ryan Leslie, who signed her to his record label, NextSelection Lifestyle Group. She was then discovered by Sean Combs, who signed her to a joint venture with his label, Bad Boy Records, to commercially release her 2006 debut single, "Me & U". The song marked the first of her two entries on the Billboard Hot 100, peaking at number three.

With "Me & U" as its lead single, Ventura's self-titled debut studio album (2006) peaked at number four on the Billboard 200 and spawned the follow-up single, "Long Way 2 Go". In 2008 and 2009, she released the singles "Official Girl" (featuring Lil Wayne), "Must Be Love" (featuring Combs), and "Let's Get Crazy" (featuring Akon). She signed with Interscope Records to release her debut mixtape, RockaByeBaby (2013), which was promoted by the videos for its singles "Numb" (featuring Rick Ross) and "Paradise" (featuring Wiz Khalifa).

Ventura signed with Lewis modeling agency Wilhelmina Models early in her career, and later One Management. She has modeled for Calvin Klein and been featured in magazines including GQ, Seventeen, and Bust. She was the face of ASOS's 2013 spring collection. She has also starred in advertising for Delia's, Adidas, Abercrombie & Fitch, and Clean & Clear. She has appeared in films such as Step Up 2: The Streets (2008) and The Perfect Match (2016).

In late 2023, Ventura settled a high-profile sexual assault and abuse lawsuit against her former partner, Sean "Diddy" Combs. Numerous lawsuits regarding sexual misconduct were filed in the following months.

== Early life ==
Casandra Elizabeth Ventura was born on August 26, 1986, in New London, Connecticut. Her mother, Regina, is of African-American, Mexican and West Indian descent. Her father, Rod, is Filipino. She attended The Williams School, a preparatory school on the Connecticut College campus. Ventura began modeling at age 14 and by 16 was modeling for local department stores, Delia's fashion catalog, and Seventeen. She briefly appeared in Mario's "Just a Friend 2002" music video.

Encouraged by producer Rockwilder, Ventura took vocal lessons and modern ballet and used her school's performing arts program. She finished high school in 2004 and moved to New York City, where she returned to modeling and took classes at the Broadway Dance Center. She began booking print and commercial modeling gigs and was represented by Wilhelmina Models.

== Career ==
=== 2004–2007: Beginnings with Bad Boy Records and Cassie ===
Ryan Leslie often saw Ventura at clubs and parties in late 2004. The two wrote a duet, "Kiss Me", and Leslie played a recording of it for music executive Tommy Mottola. Mottola offered Ventura a management deal, and Leslie signed her to NextSelection Lifestyle Group. Leslie wrote and produced Ventura's first single, "Me & U", in 2005. The song became a club hit in Germany. During this time, Sean Combs heard "Me & U" in a club, and Leslie convinced him to partner his Bad Boy Records with Leslie's NextSelection imprint for the release of Ventura's debut album.

Leslie produced most of the album, which is a mix of R&B, hip-hop and pop. Ventura said in an interview, "I rap, I sing, I do my R&B, I do my slow songs and stuff that the girls will love, I have a down South joint, I have a rock song that I did with my girls this band called Pretty Boys." She paid tribute to Filipino culture by incorporating OPM sounds into some of the ballads. The album, Cassie, was released on August 8, 2006, and sold 321,000 copies in the United States. Its lead single, "Me & U", peaked at number three on the Billboard Hot 100, selling more than 1 million digital downloads.

To promote her album, Ventura performed on Total Request Live and 106 & Park: BET's Top 10 Live. Her performances were described as "rocky" and "less-than-stellar", but Combs said that was due to her inexperience. He said he would be "with her through her development" and that he had no "question on her ability [to sing]". Ventura addressed the events on her MySpace page, saying she was aware that her performances were "pretty bad" and was "still getting over stage fright".

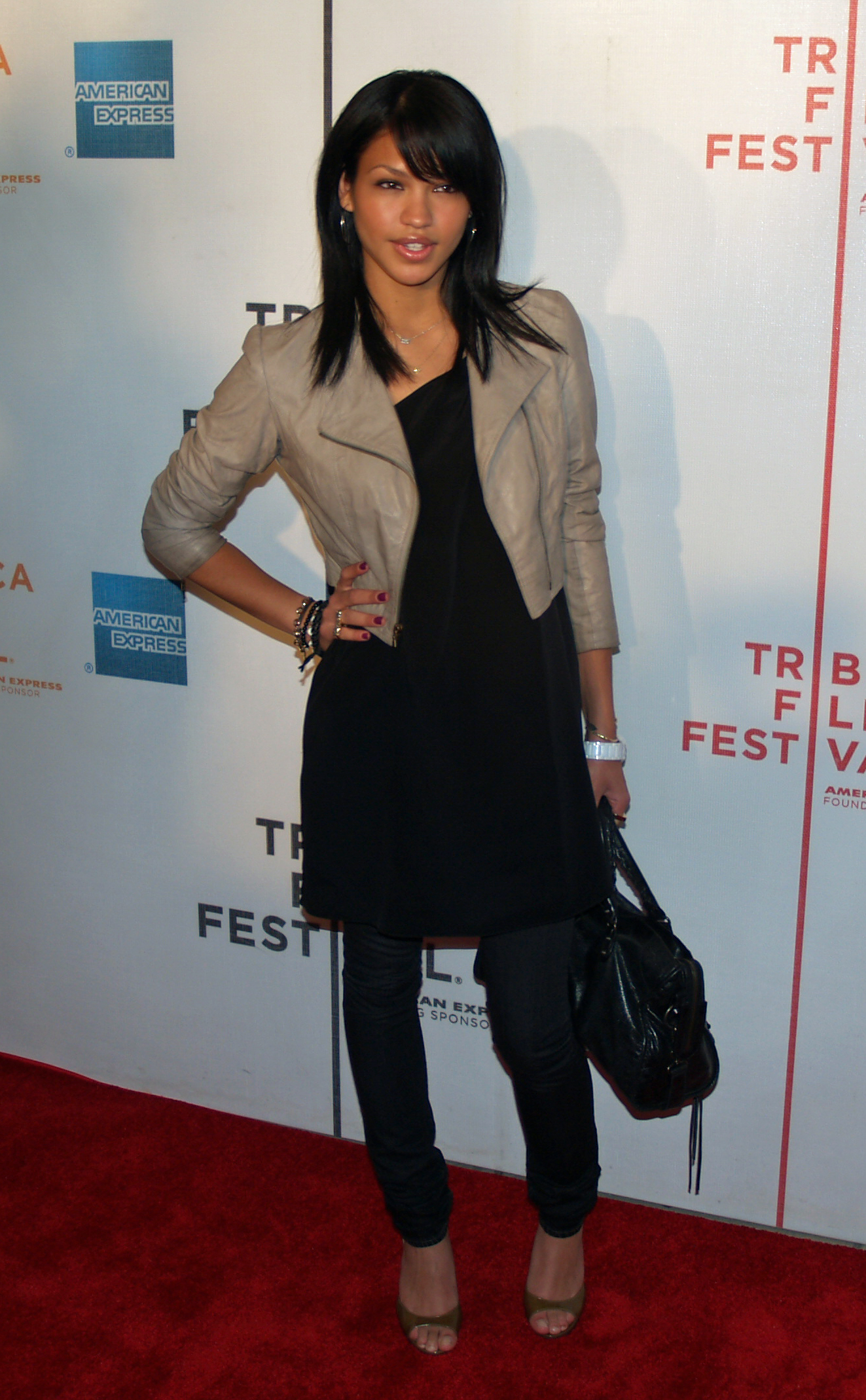
Ventura in 2007

MTV News reported in June 2007 that, contrary to rumors, Bad Boy Records had not dropped Ventura after releasing two singles from Cassie. Combs said she was working with producers Kanye West and Pharrell Williams on her second album. It was reported that Ventura was no longer collaborating with Leslie. Ventura later said she had been open to working with Leslie again. According to Bad Boy A&R Daniel "Skid" Mitchell, rather than largely relying on one songwriter-producer, the new album's mix of writers and producers and her own co-write input made it a more personal record for Ventura.

Additional production on the album came from Seven, LV, and Combs. Ventura said she had collaborated with Akon, The Neptunes, Danja, Eric Hudson, The Surf Club, and Rob Holiday, although she was not sure which tracks were going to be on the album. Of the number of producers, Ventura said she "collaborated with a lot of different producers and a lot of different writers, which was an amazing opportunity for me, because on my first album, one producer straight through... which was fun, but it was nice to experience other people."

=== 2008–2013: Acting debut and RockaByeBaby ===
In 2008, Ventura made her acting debut as Sophie Donovan in the dance film Step Up 2: The Streets. She also sang the lead single "Is It You" on the Step Up soundtrack. The song was released on November 13, 2007, and peaked at number 85 on the Canadian Hot 100 and 52 in the UK's The Official Charts Company. In July 2009, Ventura announced that her second studio album's title would be Electro Love. Ventura described the album as "sensual" and said it would demonstrate more "independence" with a "difference in vocals, a little bit more personality". Three singles have been released from the album; "Official Girl" featuring Lil Wayne in August 2008, "Must Be Love" featuring Combs in April 2009, and "Let's Get Crazy" featuring Akon in August 2009. None of them charted in the United States.

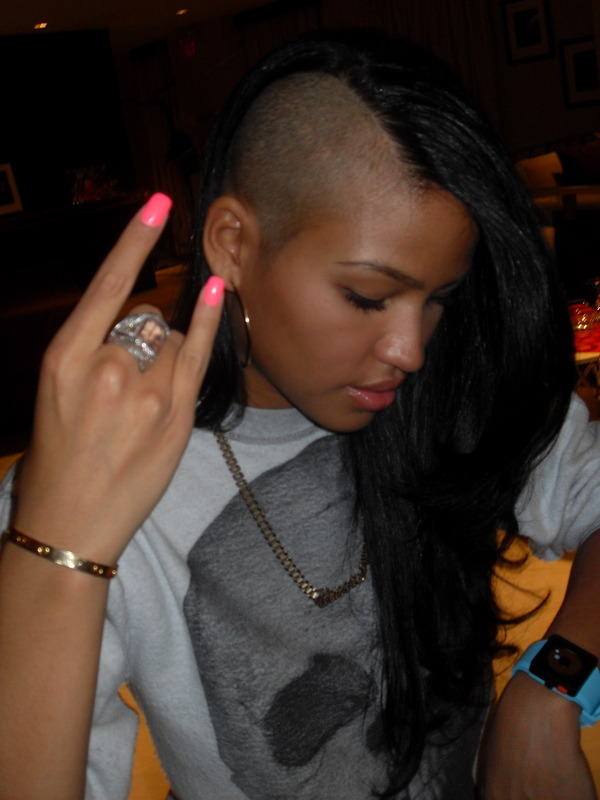
Ventura in 2009

After several delays, it was announced in December 2009 that Ventura had signed a new record deal with Interscope Records. She was featured in a spread in the August/September issue of Bust, in which she said a new single would be released in the fall. At the time of an October 2010 interview with HitQuarters, Mitchell said that Ventura had already recorded around 50 songs for the album and that she was taking her time because she wanted "it to be something that people are going to respect". She appeared in rapper Wiz Khalifa's "Roll Up" music video as his love interest.

Ventura released the single "King of Hearts" in the United States on February 14, 2012, along with its video. On April 24, 2012, she performed the single live for the first time at BET's 106 & Park music video show. She concluded the performance with a brief dance number set to Kanye West's remix of the song, along with four dancers. After the performance Ventura and 106 & Park were worldwide trending topics on Twitter and it received mostly mixed to positive reviews. The single "Balcony", featuring Young Jeezy, was sent to U.S. urban radio stations on September 18, 2012.

On September 13, 2012, Nicki Minaj released the lead single off her re-release album Pink Friday: Roman Reloaded – The Re-Up, titled "The Boys", featuring Ventura, who sung the chorus. The song was sent to urban radios on September 25. A video was released on October 18.

In July 2012, Ventura announced that she had been working simultaneously on her album and a new mixtape, RockaByeBaby. It was released on April 11, 2013, and was named the best mixtape of the year by Dazed & Confused. The mixtape saw the release of "Numb" featuring Rick Ross on April 2, along with the song's video. "Paradise", featuring Wiz Khalifa, premiered on April 9, 2013, alongside the video on BET 106 & Park. In April 2013 it was announced that Ventura was the face of the Summer 2013 Forever 21 collection.

=== 2015–2019: Unreleased second studio album and singles ===
In March 2015, after a two year hiatus, Combs announced that he would return to producing and would produce songs for Ventura's second studio album. In 2016, it was announced that Ventura would return to acting, playing the lead role in the romantic comedy The Perfect Match. It was released on March 11, 2016. In late 2017, she released the singles "Love a Loser" featuring American rapper G-Eazy and "Don't Play It Safe".

In January 2019, after ending her relationship with Combs and leaving Bad Boy Records, Ventura worked with producers Chris n Teeb and singer-songwriter Ro James. In the summer of 2019, she released several singles on her Ventura Music label: "Moments" with The Code, "Excuses", "Hungover", "Don't Let Go", "Speaking Of", "Rollercoaster" featuring Ro James, "Teach Me", and "Simple Things". Ventura called the series of releases "Free Fridays". They served as a teaser for her second album's release.

== Artistry and public image ==
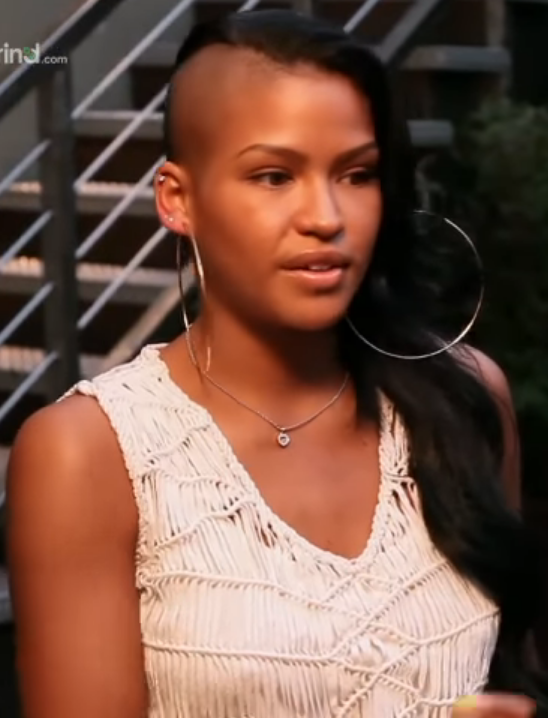
Cassie in 2012

Ventura's music has been described as R&B, pop, and hip-hop soul. Andy Kellman of AllMusic praised her vocal performances' "character and ability". Ventura cites Aaliyah, Jennifer Lopez, Christina Aguilera, Madonna, Stevie Wonder, Nine Inch Nails, Britney Spears, La Lupe, Mariah Carey, Faith Evans, and Usher as musical influences. She has called herself a "die-hard Janet Jackson fan" and said "I'd love to emulate Janet Jackson's career".

Ventura's debut album is R&B and pop rock with urban and contemporary R&B styles. It contains "looming synthesizer patterns" and "ice-cream-truck melody to give it a slightly twisted and threatening edge", as well as "flippant playfulness". RockaByeBaby is an R&B and hip-hop mixtape with a "dark" and "raw, laid back vibe".

Ventura is considered a style icon due to her "edgy style" and "feminine" and "sophisticated" fashion. She is credited with setting the trend among women of shaving their hair after shaving hers in 2009, influenced by punk. She has cited Kate Moss as a style influence.

== Personal life ==
Ventura married personal trainer Alex Fine in August 2019. They have two daughters, born in 2019 and 2021, and a son, born in 2025. As of 2026, the family resides outside of the United States.

=== Relationship with Sean Combs and lawsuit ===
Ventura was in a long-term relationship with rapper Sean Combs from 2007 to 2018. On November 16, 2023, she filed a lawsuit against Combs alleging that he subjected her to a decade-long "cycle of abuse, violence and sex trafficking". The lawsuit was filed in the U.S. District Court for the Southern District of New York under the Adult Survivors Act, a New York law that allows people who say they have suffered sexual abuse to sue after the statute of limitations has expired. Ventura claimed that the abuse began when their relationship started and that this included a 2018 rape after she tried to leave him, and multiple instances of domestic violence. Combs's attorney Ben Brafman denied the allegations. One day after Ventura filed the lawsuit, the parties announced they had reached an out-of-court settlement and did not disclose its terms. Ventura later testified in court that she had received a $20 million settlement in the case.

In 2011, Ventura was also in a relationship with Kid Cudi, who later claimed that Combs blew up his car and testified in Combs's trial that his car was destroyed by a Molotov cocktail.

In May 2024, CNN obtained and published a video of Combs grabbing Ventura, punching her, throwing her to the ground, kicking her, and stomping on her in a hotel hallway on March 5, 2016. Combs subsequently issued a video apology in which he acknowledged the incident. On May 12, 2025, Ventura began testifying in the federal sex-trafficking, racketeering, and prostitution case against Combs, detailing the abuse to which he subjected her while they were dating.

On October 3, 2025, Ventura's lawyer, Doug Wigdor, issued a statement to ABC News after Combs's sentencing, saying, "While nothing can undo the trauma caused by Combs, the sentence imposed today recognizes the impact of the serious offenses he committed."

== Discography ==
- Cassie (2006)

== Filmography ==
Film performances
Year	Title	Role
2008	Step Up 2: The Streets	Sophie
2016	The Perfect Match	Eva
2016	Honey 3: Dare to Dance	Melea Martin
2020	Spenser Confidential	Elise

Television performances
Year	Title	Role	Notes
2018	Empire	Haven Quinn	2 episodes
2022	Hip Hop Family Christmas Wedding	Jai Turner	Television film

== Awards and nominations ==
Year	Organization	Award	Work	Result
2007	NRJ Music Awards	International Revelation of the Year	Herself	Nominated
2007	ASCAP Pop Music Awards	Most Performed Songs	"Me & U"	Won
2012	MVPA Awards	Best Direction of a Female Artist	"King of Hearts"	Nominated
2012	MVPA Awards	Best R&B Video	"King of Hearts"	Won
2013	MVPA Awards	Best Art Direction	"The Boys"	Nominated
2017	Toyota Bold Awards	Beauty Bombshell of the Year	Herself	Won

== See also ==
- List of Afro-Latinos
