= Let's Get Crazy (Cassie song) =

Single by Cassie featuring Akon
- Released: August 10, 2009
- Recorded: Daddy's House Recording Studio (New York City); Chalice Recording Studio; 2nd Floor Studios (Los Angeles)
- Genre: Dance-pop; electropop
- Length: 3:56
- Label: Bad Boy; NextSelection; Atlantic
- Songwriters: Bilal Hajji; Kinnda Hamid; Nadir "RedOne" Khayat; Aliaune "Akon" Thiam
- Producer: RedOne

Cassie singles chronology
"Must Be Love" (2009)	"Let's Get Crazy" (2009)	"King of Hearts" (2012)

Akon singles chronology
"Sexy Bitch" (2009)	"Let's Get Crazy" (2009)	"On Top" (2010)

"Let's Get Crazy" is a song recorded by American singer Cassie. It features a guest appearance from American singer Akon, who co-wrote the song with Bilal Hajji, Kinnda Hamid and RedOne, with the latter also helming the song's production.

The single impacted rhythmic contemporary radio stations in the United States on August 10, 2009, and was initially digitally released on September 1, 2009, through Bad Boy in association with Atlantic Records. It peaked at number thirty-three on the US Billboard Rhythmic chart.

A reworked version of the song titled "Party Rock Remix," featuring American hip hop-electronic dance music duo LMFAO, premiered shortly after the singer moved to Interscope Records with the Bad Boy roster in late 2009. Despite Cassie originally hinting a music video shoot was being planned, accompanying visuals were not released for the track.

== Background and release ==
Cassie started working on her sophomore album in 2007, with producers Kanye West, Pharrell Williams and Ryan Leslie, who co-wrote and produced her 2006 self-titled debut album, which spawned the number three Billboard Hot 100 hit "Me & U." In the following year, Cassie released "Is It You" for the soundtrack album of the dance film Step Up 2: The Streets, in which she also co-starred as Sophie Donovan, and a single titled "Official Girl," featuring Lil Wayne. On April 14, 2009, Bad Boy Records released the single "Must Be Love," featuring Puff Daddy, tentatively a part of her upcoming second studio album Electro Love.

It was then announced that yet another new single, "Let's Get Crazy," featuring Akon, would be impacting rhythmic contemporary radio in the US on August 10, 2009. The track had previously been leaked in March 2009, as various other demos from the project's recording sessions were also surfacing online around that time. Cassie talked about working with Akon on it during a radio interview in June 2009, calling him "super creative, I can't even explain it [...] he's got a great vibe, fun to work with," expressing interest in doing another collaboration.

"Let's Get Crazy" was then made available for digital download on September 1, 2009, with a promotional CD single distributed later that year, through NextSelection, Bad Boy Records, and Interscope Records, marking Cassie's first release by the latter since her record deal signing. Wonderland described it as a "more standard-issue club banger," in comparison to her previous singles. AXS listed it as one of Cassie's ten most notable songs, in 2015, with a writer for the website commenting: "Cassie spreads the magic of her vocals with Akon in this song. You hear Akon in the back constantly [...] The beat is something to dance to [and it is] like a pop song."

== Remixes ==
A number of remixes were commissioned for the single's release, including an official reworked version of the song, the Party Rock remix featuring American hip hop-electronic dance music duo LMFAO. A Blue Ice Trance Edit also surfaced online while Philadelphia DJ Benja Styles teamed up with rapper Ness to remix "Let's Get Crazy."

== Track listing ==
- Digital download
1. "Let's Get Crazy" (featuring Akon) – 3:56
- Promo CD single
1. "Let's Get Crazy" (featuring Akon) (LMFAO Remix) – 3:16
2. "Let's Get Crazy" (featuring Akon) (LMFAO Remix Instrumental) – 3:15
3. "Let's Get Crazy" (featuring Akon) (Main) – 3:57
4. "Let's Get Crazy" (featuring Akon) (Main Instrumental) – 3:57

== Credits and personnel ==
Credits adapted from Qobuz, ASCAP and the liner notes of Let's Get Crazy.

Locations

- Recorded at Daddy's House Recording Studio, New York City, and Chalice Recording Studio and 2nd Floor Studios, Los Angeles
- Mixed at Larrabee Studios, Los Angeles

Personnel

- Cassie – vocals, background vocals, primary artist
- Akon – vocals, background vocals, featured artist, songwriter
- Bilal "The Chef" Hajji – songwriter
- Kinnda "Kee" Hamid – songwriter, background vocals
- RedOne – producer, programming, instruments, songwriter, vocal arranger
- Dave Pensado – mixing
- Jaycen Joshua – mixing
- Giancarlo Lino – mixing assistant
- Matthew Testa – assistant engineer
- Mike Donaldson – assistant engineer
- Party Rock (GoonRock, Redfoo) – remix producer

== Charts ==
Chart (2009)	Peak position
Germany (Deutsche Black Charts)	23
US Rhythmic (Billboard)	33

== Release history ==
Country	Date	Format	Label
United States	August 10, 2009	Rhythmic contemporary	Bad Boy; NextSelection; Atlantic
United States	September 1, 2009	Digital download	Bad Boy; NextSelection; Atlantic
United Kingdom	October 18, 2009	Digital download	Bad Boy; NextSelection; Atlantic
United States	2009	Promo CD single	Bad Boy; NextSelection; Interscope
