= King of Hearts (Cassie song) =

Single by Cassie
- Released: February 14, 2012
- Recorded: 2011
- Genre: Dance-pop; electro house
- Length: 3:37
- Label: Bad Boy; Interscope
- Songwriters: John J. Conte Jr.; Raelene Arreguin; Jay Singh
- Producer: J2

Cassie singles chronology
"Let's Get Crazy" (2009)	"King of Hearts" (2012)	"The Boys" (2012)

Music video
- "King of Hearts" on YouTube

"King of Hearts" is a song recorded by American singer Cassie. It was written by Jay Singh, John J. Conte Jr. and Raelene Arreguin. "King of Hearts" is an uptempo electronic dance song that features jungle beats and escalating synths. The song is lyrically centered on the theme of seduction. Music critics praised it for the musical structure, many writing that it differs from most dance-pop music on the radio.

== Background ==
MTV News reported in June 2007 that contrary to rumors, Cassie had not been dropped from Bad Boy Records after releasing two singles from her self-titled debut album. The original first single from Cassie's second studio album was to be "Official Girl", but its lack of commercial success prompted the label to release two other promotional singles: "Must Be Love" and "Let's Get Crazy", both which failed to garner commercial success. After several delays, it was announced in December 2009 that Cassie had signed a new record deal with Interscope Records. In late August 2011, Cassie announced that the album is complete, and that she recorded the last song for the album on August 26, 2011. On September 15, 2011, Cassie announced on 106 & Park that the lead single "King of Hearts" would premiere by the end of October 2011 and the album would be released in early 2012. The song was finally released for digital download on February 14, 2012 and serviced to US Rhythmic radio on March 13, 2012.

== Composition ==
"King of Hearts" is a dance-pop and electro-dance song that runs for 3:37 (3 minutes and 37 seconds). The song incorporates elements of several musical genres such as electronic music, Europop, eurodance and contemporary R&B. It features the use of echoing vocal effects Mix/Mastered by Its Hott 2 Productions (Lamis Carneiro) and a fast backbeat while running through a four-on-the-floor rhythm and playing over a bouncy beat. It begins with staccato electro synths and handclaps then follows with "thudding, slightly syncopated" drum programming. The synth arrangements escalate throughout the song. The song's musical structure has been compared to Janet Jackson's "Rock with U" and Kelis' electro-dance album Flesh Tone (2010). The beats have been described as jungle-sounding while Cassie's vocals are described as "cool and restrained". Robbie Daw of Idolator.com found Cassie's vocals to be "paper-thin". The lyrics are centered on seduction, evident in the lyrics: "You are the prince of charm, seduction is your art/ You never play my love, you're just my king of hearts."

== Critical reception ==
Marc Hogan of SPIN.com praised the song for its quality and sounding, comparing it to music by Kylie Minogue and Robyn while contrasting it with Usher's song "Climax", which was released at the same time. Hogan further writes that "Cassie's song really does keep building from beginning to end, starting with staccato pinpricks of synth and handclaps soon joined by thudding, slightly syncopated drum programming." The staff at Idolator.com writes "Unfortunately, it sounds to us as though Cassie’s heart was missing from this one." They find that "her customary distance works against her in this one, and the result is a throwaway." Prefix's Andrew Winistorfer finds that the song "will not replace "Me & U" in anyone's mind when it comes to Cassie." Bradley Stern of MuuMuse rated the song five out of five stars, lauding it as better than top 40 dance-pop songs. He writes "It’s that kind of fresh, it’s that kind of innovative: The lyrics, the melodies, the song structure, the delivery, the beats–there’s not one part of this song that contains even a single molecular flaw." DJ Ron Slomowicz of About.com praised "King of Hearts" as a dance track unlike anything on the radio, comparing it to music by Taio Cruz and Chris Brown. A writer from Evention writes "“King Of Hearts” is club music, Cassie style... An icy Ibiza-sized anthem that's just snatched the wig of every pop song released this year, without even sounding like it tried to... She sounds too bored to seduce you, but too cool to care, and that's just what makes her so darn enticing." Jim Tonze of The Guardian writes that "What’s striking about the track she posted this month, King Of Hearts, is how it involves elements of nearly everything we’ve talked about. It has the ravey club-banger aspect, it has the innovative yet commercialedge of early noughties R&B, and it has enough sadness in her vocal to draw in the indie crowd. Put simply, it’s the best-sounding identity crisis I’ve heard for a while." Beyoncé stated on her website that 'I can't stop listening to this song'.

== Promotion ==
In December 2011, Interscope released a 37-second preview of the video onto their official YouTube account. The official music video for "King of Hearts" then premiered on February 14, 2012 on VEVO. Cassie later premiered the video on BET two days later. The video was directed by Christopher Sims and takes place in a Beverly Hills mansion. Through the video Cassie wears a barely-there top and appears in different scenarios where she is dancing on the dining table and reclining in the bathtub by the fireplace.

King of Hearts was remixed by numerous DJ's including Dutch DJ R3HAB to which Rap-Up.com said it "starts off with Cassie’s sexy vocals, escalating into a synth-heavy riot for the dance floor". Erick Morillo has also remixed the track. On March 30, 2012, a Kanye West produced remix of "King of Hearts" was released online. The following month, Richard X also released his remix of the song, which got named Pitchfork's "Best New Track".

On April 24, 2012, Cassie performed the single live for the first time at BET's 106 & Park music video show. She concluded the performance with a brief dance number set to the Kanye West remix of the song, along with four dancers. After the performance Cassie and 106 & Park were worldwide trending topics on Twitter and it received mostly mixed to positive reviews from various online media outlets.

== Charts ==
Chart (2012)	Peak position
Slovakia Airplay (ČNS IFPI)	46
US Rhythmic (Mediabase)	39
