= The Boys (Nicki Minaj and Cassie song) =

Single by Nicki Minaj and Cassie

from the album Pink Friday: Roman Reloaded – The Re-Up
- Released: September 13, 2012
- Recorded: 2012
- Studio: Studio Malibu (Malibu); Jonas Mobile Studio and Jeberg Studios (Copenhagen)
- Genre: Hip hop; electropop
- Length: 4:08
- Label: Young Money; Cash Money; Universal Republic
- Songwriters: Onika Maraj; Jonas Jeberg; Jean Baptiste; Anjulie Persaud
- Producers: Jeberg; Baptiste (co.)

Nicki Minaj singles chronology
"Out of My Mind" (2012)	"The Boys" (2012)	"Automatic" (2012)

Cassie singles chronology
"King of Hearts" (2012)	"The Boys" (2012)	"Love a Loser" (2017)

"The Boys" is a song by rapper Nicki Minaj and singer Cassie from the reissue of Minaj's second studio album, Pink Friday: Roman Reloaded – The Re-Up (2012). It was released on September 13, 2012 by Young Money, Cash Money and Universal Republic as the album's lead single. It was written by Minaj, producers Jonas Jeberg and Jean Baptiste, and Anjulie Persaud. It was Minaj's last single released by Universal Republic before the label went defunct and its artists roster moved to the revived Republic Records. Initially a track recorded by Cassie for her second studio album under the title "Money on Love," it was subsequently played for Minaj during sessions for The Re-Up, who decided to keep Cassie's vocals and wrote her own verses with parts of the production re-worked.

Generally categorized as a mix of hip hop and pop, "The Boys" also incorporates elements of other genres, such as dancehall and folk music. Musically, it features strong basslines and synthesizers, along with guitar riffs and rapping. Its lyrical content is described as a "fun but pithy kiss-off to men who try to buy love with money and jewels." The song received positive reviews from music critics. It peaked at number 14 on the US Billboard Bubbling Under Hot 100 Singles and number 41 on the Hot R&B/Hip-Hop Songs chart. It also charted in European countries including Belgium, Ireland and the United Kingdom.

An accompanying music video premiered on Vevo on October 18, 2012, and was teased by Minaj with a behind-the-scenes featurette earlier that year. Directed by Colin Tilley, the video was met with generally positive reception. The colorful cartoonish visuals are set in an imaginary neighborhood where Minaj burns down a barbershop with a flamethrower after a visit to a beauty salon. Cassie plays an androgynous-looking character, inspired by the Ken doll, that "mocks the boys a little bit." Minaj performed the track on her Pink Friday: Reloaded Tour (2012).

== Background and release ==
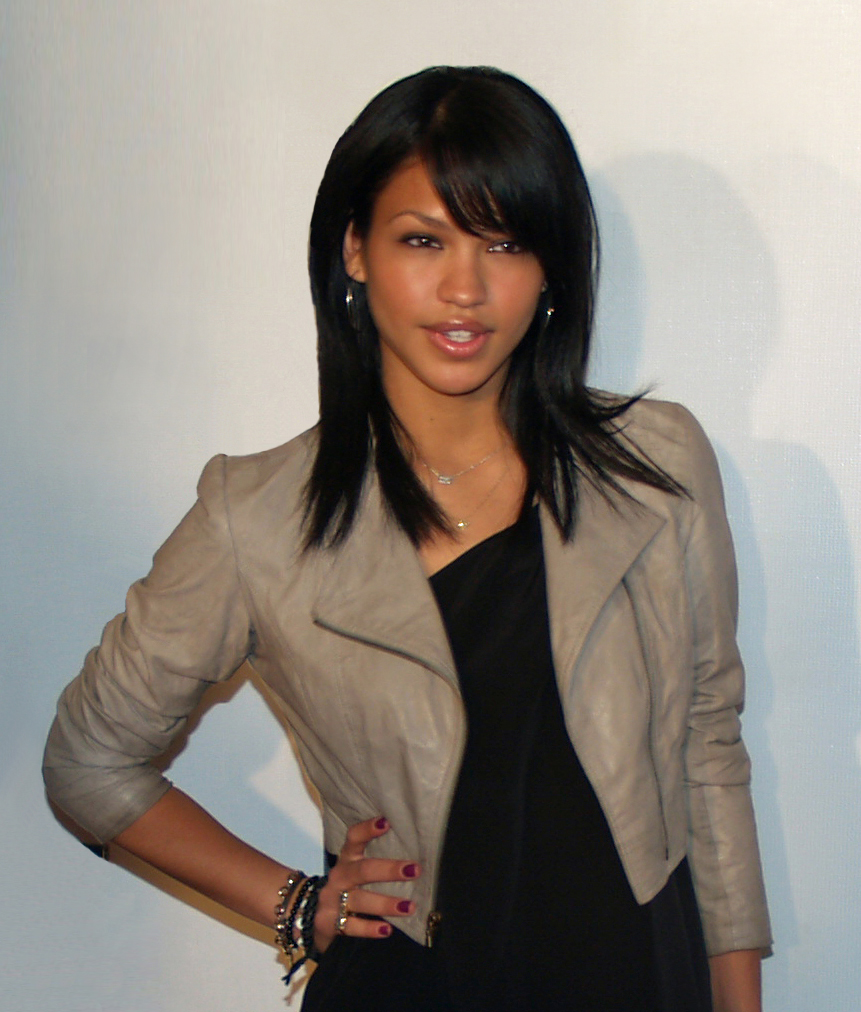
Cassie originally recorded a solo version of the track intended for her second studio album.

Minaj confirmed the re-issue of Pink Friday: Roman Reloaded and its lead single in September 2012 at the 2012 MTV Video Music Awards." She revealed through Twitter that the song's title was "The Boys" and that a "real pretty" female would be collaborating with her on it, along with a music video being planned for the track. A day later, Minaj tweeted "Thursday" which was believed to be the release date of the single. The song was released on September 13, 2012, being made available for digital download via the iTunes Store. It premiered on American radio platform iHeartRadio that same day.

"The Boys" originated from a demo called "Money on Love" that was initially recorded solely by Cassie and intended to be her second single from her second studio album. Cassie mentioned that the song was different for her and "kind of disrespectful a little," observing, "but the funny thing is, it's more my personality than anything else that anyone else has heard." "It's more of an in-your-face, tougher Cassie." She also defined it as being "a little bit funkier." The album was delayed and the track was subsequently played for Minaj during sessions for The Re-Up. Minaj decided to keep Cassie's vocals on the track, but re-wrote the majority of the verses and additional production elements were also included. "I love her verses on this record, she went in," Cassie told MTV News about working with Minaj, "I love when women collab and are all about girl power. It's not that we're against the boys; we just wanted to sing about them. And Nicki is so inspiring, I learned so much from her just even being on camera and watching her perform." Minaj and Cassie had previously collaborated on the unreleased song "Fuck U Silly," that was leaked online in January 2010.

== Composition ==
The BBC described "The Boys" as having "a mix of dancehall, folk and machine gun beats." It was written by Minaj, Anjulie Persaud, along with Jonas Jeberg and Jean Baptiste, who produced and co-produced the track respectively. It features a mix of synth swoops, syncopated percussion and gurgling acoustic guitar arpeggios by Jeberg and Baptiste. It also has a "throbbing beat, harsh basslines and hyperactive breaks." Cassie's parts, written by Canadian pop singer Anjulie, are backed up by a guitar line. Artistdirect characterized the song by stating that it "stirs a perfect storm between clever hip hop, potent pop, and soulful acoustic pondering." They detailed its structure: "Minaj lets haters know what they can do via a blunt, brilliant verse before the otherworldly cyber beat funnels into an impressive infectious robotized refrain," continuing that "then, utterly unexpectedly, the track descends into an acoustic strum and Cassie pristinely singing, 'You get high and fuck a bunch of girls and then cry on top of the world.'"

The song is about a "pithy kiss-off to men who try to buy love with money and jewels." The lyrics include references to the songs "Hey Soul Sister" by Train and "Technologic" by Daft Punk. In the lyrical content, it appears to have Minaj rapping her "most ferocious lines" according to Pitchfork, exemplified by: "I tell 'em Nicki be chillin'/ I'ma keep hurting their feelings/ Because you'll never be Jordan/ You couldn't even be Pippen/ You couldn't even be trippin'/ You can't afford a vacation/ I'm out in Haiti with Haitians/ I go to Asia with Asians/ You mad dusty/ You a lil' dusty possum/ I just come through with the six like my name was Blossom." It is written in the key of C minor at a tempo of 109 beats per minute.

== Critical reception ==
The song garnered praise from contemporary music critics. Gerrick D. Kennedy from the Los Angeles Times commented that Minaj has "married the two styles" of rap and pop with "The Boys," adding that the song "begs for immediate radio play" and is a "fresh reminder of the Minaj tracks her rap fans love." Popdust's Nate Jones gave four out of five stars to the track, saying that it is "catchy as hell, but with enough 'credibility'." Writing for Artistdirect, Rick Florino gave the song five out of five stars, calling it "one of Minaj's best tracks yet and a landmark song for 2012," thanking her for "changing the game again" and claiming that "there's no one as exciting as Nicki Minaj in either pop or hip hop." Carrie Batten of Pitchfork gave it a positive review by writing the track is "a zig-zagging pocket symphony whose bubblegum is so sugary it might actually raise your glycemic index just by hitting your ears." MuuMuse's Bradley Stern called the duet "fiery" and "robo-tastic," also comparing "The Boys" to Minaj's previous singles "Super Bass" and "Stupid Hoe."

A writer for The Huffington Post stated: "The track is actually interesting because it vacillates from rap song to some version of a downtempo singer-songwriter tune." Sal Cinquemani from Slant Magazine positively expressed that the song "mixes hard and soft, with Minaj's Daft Punk-inspired flow complemented by an acoustic guitar-accompanied chorus." MTV's Michael Depland remarked that "on her latest banga, Nicki spits hot rhymes while Cassie brings the smooth vocals," and recognized they "make a pretty spectacular team." Nadeska Alexis of the same publication wrote that "the rapper has finally found a bit of balance between her hip-hop roots and her pop persona," attributing that to the fact "while the radio-ready beat is certainly pop, Minaj also gets back to spitting bars," noticing Cassie's "sugary hook." Spin's Marc Hogan deemed it "a hybrid between the light, buoyant pop of Minaj's biggest hit to date, "Super Bass," and her old, unhinged guest and mixtape appearances." Mickey Woods from Glamour felt that "The Boys" is "just as rainbow-brite spaz-tastic as we've come to expect from Nicki," elaborating, "Kaleidoscopic in its scope, the song practically zig-zags through genres and rapid-fire rhyme schemes while somehow managing to sound catchy enough to give me one of those insta-sugar boosts that only the catchiest pop music can give."

== Music video ==
=== Background and concept ===
Minaj announced that a video for "The Boys" was in the works during a Twitter Q&A with fans in early September 2012. It was filmed later that month at a closed studio set in Los Angeles. The music video was directed by Colin Tilley, who had worked with Minaj in the music video for "I Am Your Leader" earlier that year. Behind-the-scenes footage was shared online on October 3, 2012, showing a colorful pink set with Minaj wearing neon colored clothing and driving around a block in a "souped-up pink whip" featuring "Barb-inspired delights" and her alter ego Roman's own ice cream parlor. Minaj can be heard saying, "Whoa, I wanna live on this block." She teased still shots from the video in the days leading up to its release. The official music video for "The Boys" premiered on October 18, 2012, on Vevo.

Cassie explained everyone had an opportunity to play on set with their interpretation of the track, and she came up with the idea of sporting a men's suit with Ken doll-inspired hair while counting money to "mock the boys a little bit." The final scene originated from Tilley so there would be "some sort of ending to the story." She cleared up the original concept and talked about the experience: "[Nicki's] taking over, she's re-upping, she's re-loading, so that was just Colin's off-the-wall concept and idea but I love it. I've never done a video that's actually felt like pop art when I was on the set. It was really cool."

=== Synopsis ===
Minaj in a colorful salon wearing a pink wig and purple Louboutins

The colorful visuals, set in an imaginary neighborhood, open with a white fountain flowing with pink liquid, introducing the director and the two artists in the video. The scene changes to a woman reading a newspaper with Minaj's photo on the cover next to the headline "Barber Shop Burns Down After "Freak" Flame-Thrower Accident," Minaj is then quickly seen looking maliciously at the camera indicating her as the culprit. A scene is shown of a man unconsciously knocked out with sounds of fire alarms going off. The scene changes to Minaj crashing a pink car, with men smirking at her as she steps out wearing a yellow and pink wig. Minaj begins walking down a colorful street rapping to the song, with men behind her dressed in pink holding umbrellas. Cassie is shown singing the chorus in the same setting with a yellow mohawk, multicolored blazer, white pants and black platforms, with men gazing in awe while ostentatiously lusting after her, as women continue to roller skate in the background. The scene then cuts to Cassie in a white bikini in a pink and white polka dotted room with a giant ball of the same pattern. The angle switches to Minaj pulling off in an orange Campagna T-Rex, in a yellow background sporting a blonde wig, a pink bikini, and shades. Minaj joins Cassie in the polka-dotted scene, donning a blue and pink wig this time, and a yellow and black outfit with blue shoes, while Cassie continues to sing her part. Minaj sensually touches Cassie, dancing in precarious positions along Cassie's waistline and thighs.

Minaj and Cassie go through many costume changes in the video. Various clips of Minaj and Cassie appear as the chorus goes, including Minaj bouncing on the ball as she raps along. Minaj then starts the second verse inside of a colorful beauty salon, sporting a pink wig, getting her hair done. Dancers are seen doing choreography in the salon and Cassie begins to sing the chorus again while sitting down in the same setting, dressed in a blue men's suit, holding a stack of money that she proceeds to throw in the air as she joins the dancers. Minaj is now rapping the last verse of the track and opens the scene with a flamethrower, donning a blonde wig, wearing a denim bra and a skirt, in a crime scene set in a burnt down barbershop, with blazing blue flames and unconscious men behind her. More clips from previous scenes of Minaj and Cassie interacting are continuously shown throughout the visuals. Towards the end of the music video, Minaj is seen playing with her hair, as Cassie appears in another scene sitting on a lip shaped couch and Minaj smiling in her T-Rex automobile.

=== Reception ===
Rolling Stone described the music video as "chock full of two things: fire and the color pink." Vibe called it "steamy" and "sexuality-challenging," and explored discussion of women "exhibiting lesbian curiosity." Stereogum's Tom Breihan posted that the video had "vicious day-glo absurdity" levels, drawing comparisons between Cassie's looks and Grace Jones, referencing "a futuristic motorcycle thing that may have escaped from a 2002 Jadakiss video." Carrie Battan of Pitchfork stated the "bubblegummy single" had the "brightest video ever," detailing it as "an epic, rainbow-bright, gender-bending tale of revenge crimes against the entire male population."

Billboard's Erika Ramirez commented that "both ladies wow the working gentlemen with their 'tude and revealing outfits, from swimwear to sexy menswear" in the clip. Katie Hasty from HitFix noted that it "will ring familiar, albeit in furious colors of magenta, aggressive greens, volcanic reds and the rapper's favorite color" on the track that "takes solid aim at the boys of hip-hop, how they expect their "love" to be hand-delivered as a commodity," and that its creators also tried to mix up the genders with the styling in the visuals, "by putting Cassie in a suit without a shirt on underneath, for instance, or Nicki rocking denim in a princess-styled two-piece." At Hip-Hop Wired, Kazeem Famuyide wrote they delivered a video that "seems to be made for the hyper-media generation of GIF-makers and Tumblr addicts." Spin declared "the clip melds cartoonish hyper-sexuality with a murderous rampage," defining it as "outlandish and revealingly attired."

Lauren Nostro from Complex pointed out "it was captivating as we had hoped" and "marks the debut of Cassie's big return as a pop star." Other publications also commended Cassie's androgyny looks in the video, embracing "her masculine side in a blue suit," with Allure suggesting the "extreme looks are so easy to imitate, making Minaj and Cassie such a great (and timely) duo Halloween costume." MTV's Nadeska Alexis selected "Cassie's transformation into a man, sporting a dark blue suit with cropped neon hair, is our favorite look." Popdust recounted the video as Minaj and Cassie embarking "on giving a tutorial in how to make certain boys – the kind who've probably done you wrong or will soon do you wrong – jealous, and maybe a little scared for their well-being," and added that the opening newspaper headline warning was reminiscent of another "femme fatale" collaboration, Lady Gaga and Beyoncé's "Telephone." The music video was nominated for Best Art Direction at the 2013 MVPA Awards.

== Track listing ==
- Digital download (Explicit version)
1. "The Boys" – 4:08
- Digital download (Clean version)
1. "The Boys" – 4:09

== Credits and personnel ==
Credits adapted from the liner notes of Pink Friday: Roman Reloaded – The Re-Up.

- Nicki Minaj – vocals
- Cassie – vocals
- Jonas Jeberg – producer, instruments, programming, mixing, engineer
- Jean Baptiste – co-producer
- Chris Athens – mastering
- Ariel Chobaz – mixing, engineer
- Kuk Harrell – additional vocal producer, engineer
- Josh Gudwin – engineer

== Charts ==
Chart (2012)	Peak position
Belgium (Ultratip Bubbling Under Flanders)	54
Belgium (Ultratop Urban Flanders)	37
Germany (Deutsche Black Charts)	9
Ireland (IRMA)	95
South Korea International Singles (Gaon)	94
UK Singles (Official Charts Company)	101
UK Hip Hop/R&B (Official Charts)	15
US Bubbling Under Hot 100 (Billboard)	14
US Hot R&B/Hip-Hop Songs (Billboard)	41

== Certifications ==
Region	Certification	Certified units/sales
Brazil (Pro-Música Brasil)	Gold	30,000^{‡}
^{‡} Sales+streaming figures based on certification alone.

== Release history ==
Country	Date	Format	Label
United States	September 13, 2012	Digital download	Young Money; Cash Money; Universal Republic
United Kingdom	September 14, 2012	Digital download	Young Money; Cash Money; Universal Republic
United States	September 25, 2012	Urban contemporary	Young Money; Cash Money; Universal Republic
