= Official Girl =

2008 single by Cassie featuring Lil Wayne

Single by Cassie featuring Lil Wayne

from the album Official Girl (unreleased)
- Released: August 5, 2008
- Recorded: 2007–08; Legacy Studios (New York City)
- Genre: Electro-R&B
- Length: 4:17
- Label: Bad Boy; NextSelection; Atlantic
- Songwriters: Balewa Muhammad; Candice Nelson; Ezekiel Lewis; Dwayne Carter; Nathaniel Hills; Marcella Araica
- Producer: Danja

Cassie singles chronology
"Addiction" (2008)	"Official Girl" (2008)	"Must Be Love" (2009)

Lil Wayne singles chronology
"Shawty Say" (2008)	"Official Girl" (2008)	"Haterz" (2008)

"Official Girl" is a song recorded by American singer Cassie. It features vocals by American rapper Lil Wayne, who wrote his guest verse, while the original composition was written by members of collective The Clutch including Balewa Muhammad, Candice Nelson, Ezekiel Lewis, along with Marcella Araica and Nathaniel "Danja" Hills. Production was also handled by Hills. The song was first released for digital download in the United States on August 5, 2008, through Bad Boy and NextSelection in association with Atlantic Records, who then serviced it to rhythmic contemporary radio stations on September 22, 2008. The single was issued on vinyl as well with a promotional record being released that month.

Originally intended to be the first single from her second studio album, "Official Girl" is an R&B song, with the beat being referred to as "candy-floss production." Cassie stated the track stood out to her for its relatability with a good message and for being musically different. The song's lyrics consist of Cassie seeking status confirmation in a relationship as she is presented at a crisis between vulnerability and authority; she clarified its meaning as "standing up for what you want out of it." It garnered generally favorable reviews from music critics, who complimented its production and Cassie's delivery of the song's lyrical content.

The accompanying music video was directed by Chris Robinson and its concept revolves around Cassie's interpretation of the track's message, in which she grows frustrated over the uncertainty of a relationship with a man before deciding to break things off with him. The video's dance segments and styling generated Aaliyah comparisons. "Official Girl" debuted at number one on the US Billboard Hot Videoclip Tracks and the Norway Digital Songs charts, also topping MTV's TRL countdown.

== Background ==
After releasing two singles from her self-titled debut album, "Me & U" and "Long Way 2 Go," Cassie went back home for a period of time, "I got really sick and was in the hospital in like November or December. It was stress and exhaustion, and I ended up going home to Connecticut. [Puffy] actually called me up when I was at home and asked me what I wanted to do. I was like, 'I want to do another album.'" She returned to the studio in 2007 with Ryan Leslie, who had co-written and produced the entire album released in the past year. It was reported she would also be collaborating with Pharrell Williams and Kanye West, after being featured as the female lead in the latter's "Stronger" music video. Later that year, she released "Is It You," included in the soundtrack album of the dance flick Step Up 2: The Streets released in February 2008, in which she starred as Sophie Donovan.

Cassie then talked about her yet-untitled sophomore project: "I found the sound that I was after, which is the hardest thing especially when you're moving onto a project that is so much more important and you have so much to prove," elaborating on its sound, "Now it's about becoming a woman, and I'm not quite there yet, but I'm going through the experiences that make me get there. It's a more vulnerable album; it's a little bit stripped down as far as vocally and the content in the songs." Cassie added she was working with various other producers, including Danja and Jim Beanz, and had been looking forward to that opportunity particularly after hearing a song they had produced for Britney Spears called "Perfect Lover." She stated in another interview that she was more vulnerable in her new songs, and that her vocals could be heard better. She felt there was "real emotion and a much realer connection with [her] fans." She said that her first single would be "a club record – something fun and danceable," and cited "My House," "Push It" and "Thirsty" as possible single choices for the album.

== Release ==
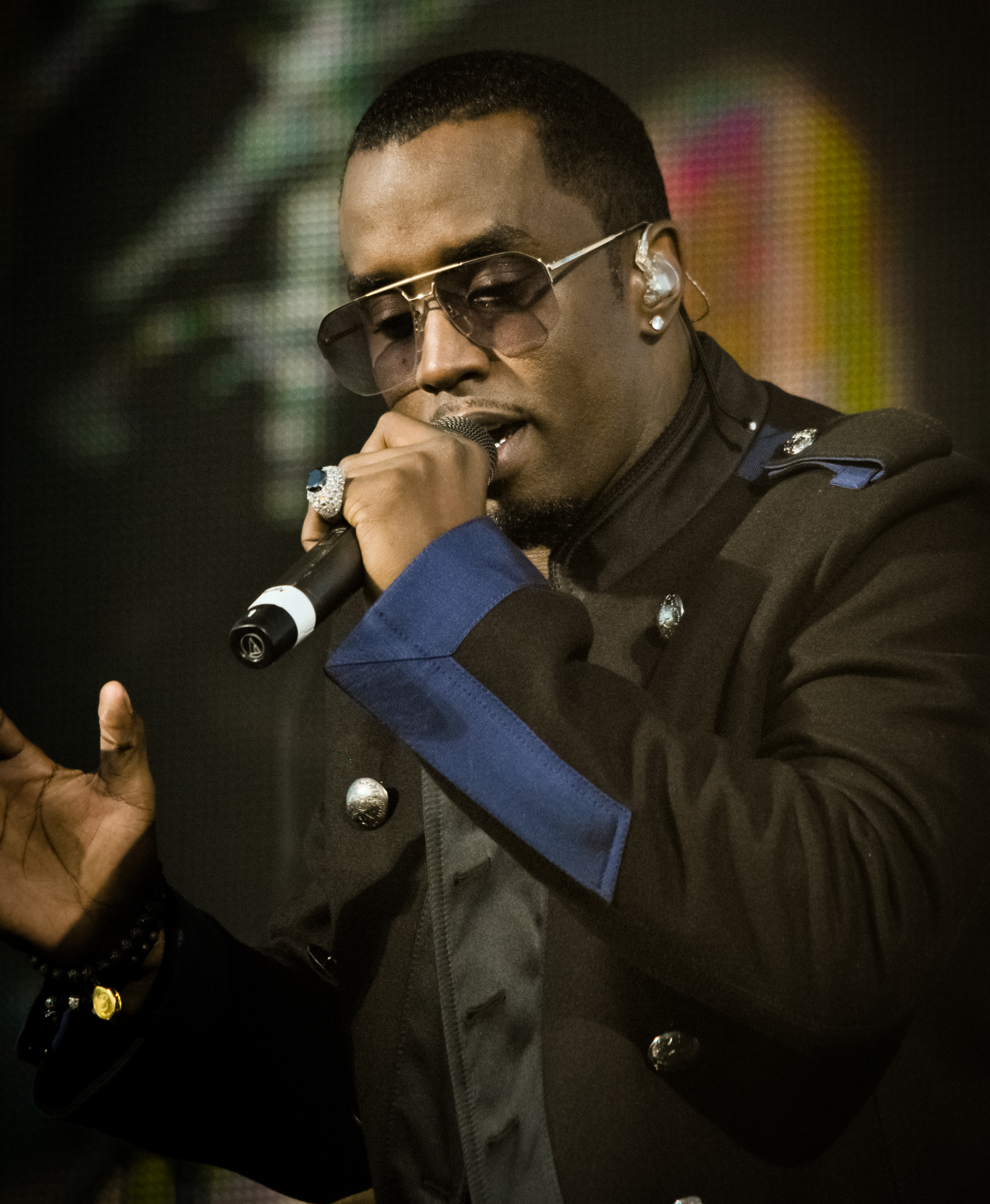
Diddy surprised Cassie with Lil Wayne's verse for the single release.

On February 11, 2008, Cassie made an appearance on MTV's TRL to promote the movie Step Up 2: The Streets and announced the first single from her upcoming album would be "Official Girl," produced by Danja and written by The Clutch. Diddy discussed the single with Billboard, revealing the album was tentatively scheduled for a September release and it would "really, really catch people off guard," mentioning Spears and Janet Jackson as influences. A solo version of "Official Girl" was made available for streaming on Cassie's MySpace page on April 10, 2008. A demo version of the track had been originally recorded by a young singer Karina Pasian and was also leaked. Diddy and Cassie shared another video introducing the song, with Cassie saying: "I think a lot of girls are gonna be able to relate to it." In June 2008, footage from a promotional photoshoot for the single was posted online. It was then announced Lil Wayne would be featured on the final version of the single and he had filmed his guest spot in the video. It premiered online in late July 2008. "Official Girl" was finally made available for digital download on August 5, 2008, via the iTunes Store.

Lil Wayne called it "wonderful" to work with Cassie, "she's a beautiful person, her voice is crazy," continuing that the reason he got on the track was due to Danja's "tricky" and creative production which he considered difficult and challenging to lay his rap verse over. Cassie was surprised by Diddy with the rapper's inclusion and complimented it noting, "It was great energy. I couldn't have asked for anything more." She remembered first hearing "Official Girl" in a mix that was playing in the studio and it "just really stood out to me. It's so relatable to me as well to other young girls. I think the song has a good message and musically it's so different." Cassie addressed claims regarding the song being a marketing ploy to cash in on rumors about her relationship with Diddy stating, "It wasn't planned. It was just a song I really loved that I heard. Nobody will ever know who [the song] is about. [...] Anything that happens in my personal life is personal. [...] I don't want it to be about who I'm dating. I want people to take my career more seriously." However, she later confirmed she was indeed someone's "un-official" girl at the time. Meanwhile, her second album was then set for an early 2009 release. Ryan Leslie noted Cassie had "played a huge role in the selection of songs and a huge role in the execution" of the album. Despite the single also being released under his NextSelection imprint, it marked her first music release not to be written nor produced by Leslie.

== Composition and lyrical interpretation ==
"Official Girl" is an R&B song, with a length of four minutes and seventeen seconds. It was written by members of The Clutch collective: Balewa Muhammad, Candice Nelson, Ezekiel "Zeke" Lewis, along with Marcella "Ms. Lago" Araica, Lil Wayne and Nathaniel "Danja" Hills. The Clutch were responsible for the musical arrangement and Danja produced it, while Araica handled mixing at the Hit Factory Criteria, Miami, with additional collaborator Chad Jolley. Cassie recorded the song at Legacy Studios, New York City, with engineering by Dave Hyman. Cassie said that "Official Girl" was a great first single for her because "it said something." Lyrically, she explained, "from the beginning of the record you kind of feel like, you know, 'I'm leaving it up to you. I left it to you,'" and by the second verse until the end, "it just feels like I'm saying, 'I don't want to put up with it anymore. It's not fair.'" Cassie hoped that the song could spread the message of girl power and empower girls to stand up and take control of their romantic relationships. She said that she "fell in love with records like Beyoncé's "Irreplaceable," where you could emotionally attach yourself to the record as soon as you heard it. I didn't want something so vague and so clubby, because I wanted people to see me as a woman with something to say."

The Clutch wrote "Official Girl." It fit really well right into actually being able to emotionally attach myself to a song, knowing that other girls out there would totally feel it too.

— Cassie discussing her connection to the lyrics.

Cassie defined an official girl as somebody who is in a relationship or seeing someone, and they're "attentive, honest, forthright and not seeing anybody else." She declared, "[...] but at the same time you can let go a little bit. To be an official girl, you just have to ride for your significant other and support them 100 percent." The opposite would be someone who does not want "a full blown relationship and doesn't wanna take it that far." She confessed knowing a lot of women who have been through a situation where "the guy just doesn't take them seriously because they just want to have fun and be a dude," and recalled being in a similar position herself, "I've been in a relationship before and I was ready to make it official but they weren't, we were on two different pages and it didn't work out." Deciding that an official girl gets more respect as a woman, she believes that title symbolizes "standing up for what you want, saying this is what I need out of this relationship and if I'm not gonna get it then, I'm sorry, we're through." According to Cassie, the song is for "anybody that believes that they deserve something great."

== Critical reception ==
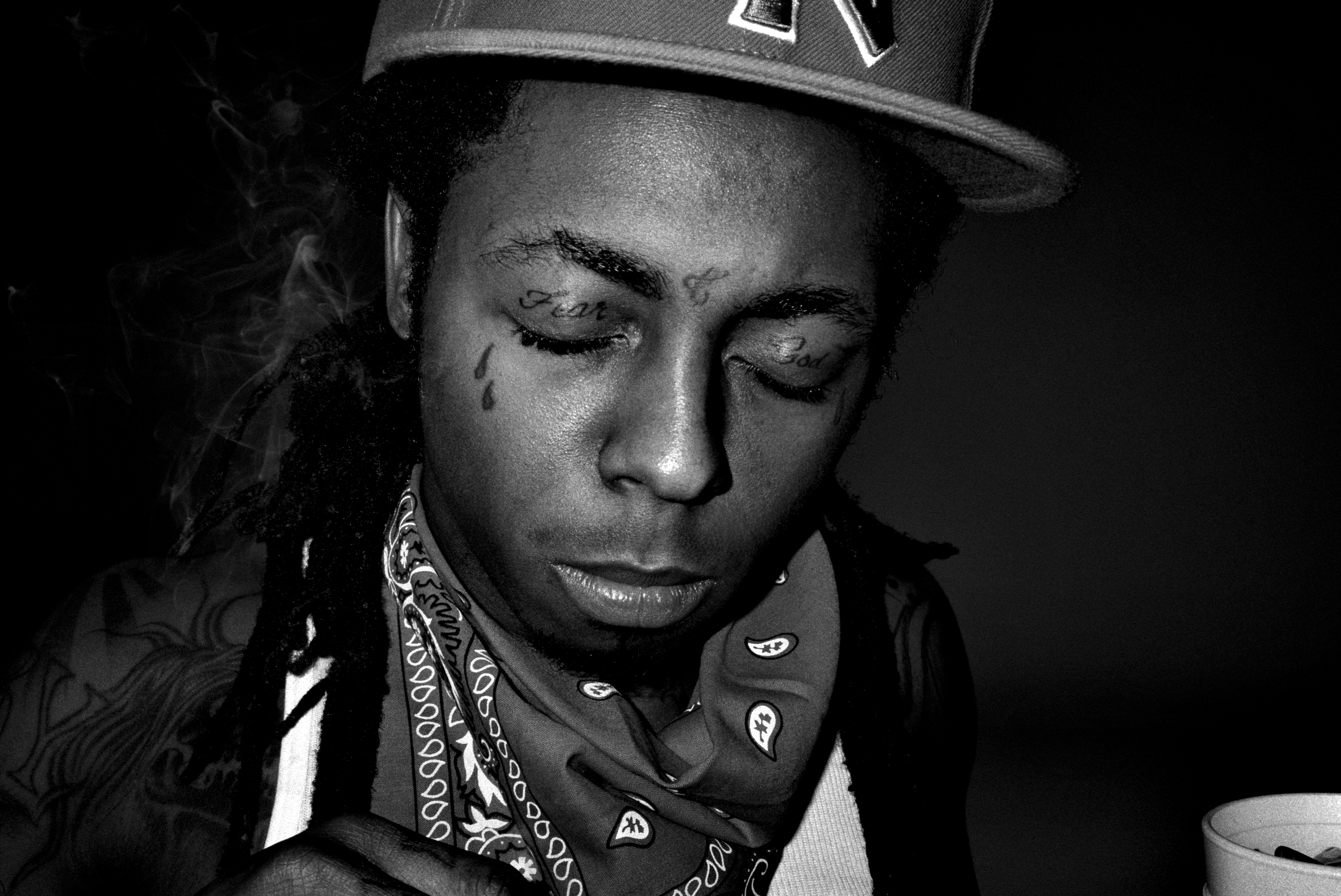
Lil Wayne's guest appearance was well received by critics.

"Official Girl" was received with generally positive reviews from music critics. August Brown of the Los Angeles Times wrote the fact that Cassie is "a total cypher for whatever producer she's working with makes for some pretty interesting moments of electro-R&B minimalism" and "such an aggressive non-presence in any song still makes for striking radio singles," despite the track not being her best work. MTV's Jocelyn Vena felt that Cassie's "personality comes through on her latest single," describing it as "a song dedicated to independent-spirited ladies everywhere." Jonathan Reyes of AllHipHop praised Danja's production noting "it packs the signature that we've grown to love from the Virginia native," continuing, "The lyrics are simple and really show the Clutch's superior ability to adapt to each artist they write for. As a statement, "Official Girl" really makes one." Waqar Hassan of AXS also pointed out that "the beat on this song remains in your head for years," and applauded the performers: "The singing on this track is perfect too. Lil Wayne shows up in the middle of the track to show his rapping skills and does his part extremely well."

The Guardian's Alex Macpherson commented that "producer Danjahandz swathes [Cassie] in candy-floss production" on the track as she demands clarity in a relationship, "she cajoles, threatens, pleads, swears she can measure up. The song climaxes with the frankly brilliant line, 'I ain't making ultimatums – I'mma tell you like this verbatim!'" Writing for Dummy Mag, Tom Lea of Local Action Records remarked that the song "showcases Cassie at the perfect crossroads between vulnerability ("I wanna be your official girl") and authority ("be a shame to say you lost me / but if you want that it's a wrap and I won't look back")," concluding "It's that perfect juxtaposition between hard and soft that makes so much R'n'B work." While in Fact Magazine stated: "The source material on "Official Girl" is pretty flawless – Cassie's brilliant, and Lil Wayne's always great when he's a) talking about giving oral sex in the way that most rappers won't ("I'll never diss you / and I'll kiss you / on your little pearl") and b) thinking he's said something really clever when he actually hasn't ("I know I can make you come... right back!")." BET listed "Official Girl" as one of Cassie's best collaborations, expressing: "Every girl has questions if they're waiting for their boo to make it official, so the message was clear. It was time for her man to step up, make it official and let love rule [...] she went in!"

== Remixes and other use ==
CFCF remixed the track, with The Fader detailing, "where he takes the robotic detachment of the original and transforms it into a song full of warm sci-fi synth ripples that conveniently emphasize the ultra-creepiness of Wayne's verse." Deadboy released his reworked "Unofficial Girl," included on his 2010 EP Cash Antics Volume 1. Fact gave the remix a score of three and a half, remarking that Deadboy "doesn't do much on this edit bar speed up the vocal, add a drum loop and a sea-sick, loping synth melody, but it works brilliantly." Matthew Schnipper of The Fader wrote that "he's reassigned the upper hand to Cassie, an ultimatum song, not a dear diary rant about side chick status. That repowering is Deadboy's MO, a partnership between sadness and triumph." The Blessings also remixed it for Skydiver, a 2010 remix compilation album by independent British label Local Action tributing Cassie.

== Music video ==
=== Background and synopsis ===
Cassie was spotted filming the music video in Manhattan in April 2008. In June 2008, it was reported Lil Wayne had shot his scenes in Los Angeles. The music video was directed by Chris Robinson. On August 1, 2008, a trailer was released online and announced the video would be premiering in the following month. Cassie premiered the music video for "Official Girl" on August 22, 2008, on MTV's FNMTV. Cassie affirmed that she couldn't take credit for Lil Wayne's guest appearance as Diddy surprised her with his verse and cameo, who she considered to be "one of the best rappers out right now." "The first time I actually got to hang out with him was on the video set, and he has such great energy. That was actually the day he went platinum, so that energy on the shoot was amazing too," she told Rap-Up.

The music video includes dance scenes of Cassie and male dancers, which were characterized as being reminiscent of Aaliyah.

Cassie described the video's plot as "a series of things," where she is in the "crazy-girl stage." She said that it was "about the fly chick, she's going into the hotel, feeling out her situation, talking to the guy who she thinks is there, but it's really not. You have to see it. It's hard to explain." At the end of the video, dissatisfied and tired of the uncertainty, Cassie decides to call off the relationship by going to her love interest's offices and "show him what he'll be missing." She proceeds to throw some portraits on his desk she had been taking of herself as previously shown, before storming off. Along with several background settings and wardrobe changes, it also includes a series of dance shots, with Cassie considering her choreography to be at a "whole new level," and that she had "never seen myself dance like this before." Cassie can be seen in a Bugatti Veyron in the video. She visited BET's 106 & Park on September 23, 2008, to introduce the music video.

=== Concept and reception ===
While talking about the definition of the track's title, Cassie specified: "[An "official girl" is] strong, she knows what she wants, and she won't let a man dictate what she wants to do in her life. If he doesn't want to be with her, then she doesn't need him," explaining how that was translated visually, "I don't know if it's necessarily a title [...] but it's about being the only one. I think that's more or less where I was going with the video, and the song, saying that I won't play side-girl, I won't play second girl." Marni Senofonte styled the video with "elements of unattainable, yet attainable," as Cassie disclosed to People: "I wanted this to be a very stylish video. I wanted for a guy to see it and say 'Oh, I want to be with her,' and for the girls to say 'Oh, I would definitely wear what she wore.'" The music video drew comparisons to Aaliyah. Seventeen admired the styling, highlighting the Givenchy boots she wears in the beginning of the video and observing, "I mean seriously can this girl get anymore fly? Not only is she drop-dead gorgeous, but her style is off-the-radar cool too!"

"Official Girl" debuted at number one on the US Billboard Hot Videoclip Tracks chart for the week of September 13, 2008, which ranked component digital sales and airplay, becoming the first ever to do so. The video also peaked at number one on MTV's TRL on September 9, 2008. The music video ranked at ninety-three on BET: Notarized Top 100 Videos of 2008 countdown.

== Track listing ==
- Digital download
1. "Official Girl" (featuring Lil Wayne) – 4:17
- 12-inch vinyl
1. "Official Girl" (featuring Lil Wayne) (Main) – 4:18
2. "Official Girl" (featuring Lil Wayne) (Instrumental) – 3:30

== Credits and personnel ==
Credits adapted from the liner notes of Official Girl.

Locations

- Recorded at Legacy Studios, New York City
- Mixed at The Hit Factory Criteria, Miami

Personnel

- Cassie – vocals, primary artist
- Lil Wayne – vocals, featured artist, songwriter
- Balewa Muhammad – songwriter
- Candice Nelson – songwriter
- Ezekiel "Zeke" Lewis – songwriter
- Nathaniel "Danja" Hills – producer, songwriter
- Marcella "Ms. Lago" Araica – songwriter, mixing
- The Clutch – arrangement
- Dave Hyman – engineer
- Chad Jolley – mixing assistant
- Ryan Leslie – executive producer
- P. Diddy – executive producer
- Harve Pierre – co-executive producer
- Gwendolyn Niles – associate executive producer

== Charts ==
Chart (2008)	Peak position
Norway Digital Songs (Billboard)	1
US Hot Videoclip Tracks (Billboard)	1

== Release history ==
Country	Date	Format	Label
United States	August 5, 2008	Digital download	Bad Boy; NextSelection; Atlantic
United States	September 16, 2008	Vinyl	Bad Boy; NextSelection; Atlantic
United States	September 22, 2008	Rhythmic contemporary	Bad Boy; NextSelection; Atlantic
United Kingdom	February 22, 2009	Digital download	Bad Boy; NextSelection; Warner
