= Is It You (Cassie song) =

Single by Cassie

from the album Step Up 2: The Streets (soundtrack)
- Released: November 13, 2007
- Recorded: May 2007; Paramount Studios (Los Angeles)
- Genre: R&B; pop rock
- Length: 3:57
- Label: NextSelection; Bad Boy; Atlantic
- Songwriters: Ryan Leslie; Brent Paschke
- Producers: Ryan Leslie; Brent Paschke (co.)

Cassie singles chronology
"Long Way 2 Go" (2006)	"Is It You" (2007)	"Addiction" (2008)

"Is It You" is a song recorded by American singer Cassie for the soundtrack album of the 2008 dance film Step Up 2: The Streets, in which she co-stars as Sophie Donovan. It was made available for digital download on November 13, 2007, through NextSelection Lifestyle Group's venture with Bad Boy and Atlantic Records. The song was written by producer Ryan Leslie and co-producer Brent Paschke.

Cassie stated she recorded it in May 2007 in Los Angeles and "tucked it away" for her album as she was preparing to shoot the film and not planning on being a part of the soundtrack. She described it as "something a lot different for me," but when asked by Touchstone to submit a track she considered it was the "perfect song," calling it young and fresh. "Is It You" received positive reception from contemporary critics and was listed as one of the best songs of 2007 by Pitchfork. It peaked at number fifty-two on the UK Singles Chart, while reaching the top ten on the UK R&B Singles Chart, and also gained attention in Canada and Australia where it appeared inside the digital charts.

An accompanying music video premiered online in February 2008 to promote the movie's theatrical release and was also featured as an outtake on its DVD release, indicating it had been considered for inclusion in the feature film but ultimately did not make it, which Cassie appreciated so people could differentiate her music career from the acting and did not wish to mix the two. The visuals mostly show Cassie singing next to Ryan Leslie while he plays the piano in a dance studio, as other clips from Step Up 2 are interspersed between different shots of the two performers.

== Background and development ==
After moving to New York City to pursue a modeling career, Cassie met producer Ryan Leslie in 2004. They started recording music together in the following year, with Leslie eventually writing and producing her entire self-titled debut album Cassie, released on August 8, 2006, through his NextSelection imprint in partnership with Diddy's Bad Boy Records, and distributed by Atlantic Records. It was preceded by the Platinum single "Me & U," which peaked in the top ten of several countries, including number three on the US Billboard Hot 100 and spent seven weeks atop the US Airplay chart.

In 2007, it was revealed Cassie was back in the studio working on her sophomore album, with Leslie listed again as one of her collaborators. It was also announced she had been cast on the sequel to the 2006 American dance film Step Up from Touchstone Pictures as Sophie Donovan, portrayed as a "triple threat, and supposed to be an intimidating character towards [the lead] Andie." Cassie didn't plan being featured on the soundtrack, initially wanting to separate her music career from the acting, but when approached for song submissions, she recalled during an appearance on MTV's Total Request Live to promote Step Up 2, she had been recording in Los Angeles before shooting the movie, and came up with "Is It You." "[It] is one of the most fun songs I've done, it's very pop, very different from what I'm normally doing. But, it's raw at the same time, and fits the movie perfectly," she elaborated. The track became digitally available on November 13, 2007, with a CD single released on May 13, 2008.

== Critical reception ==
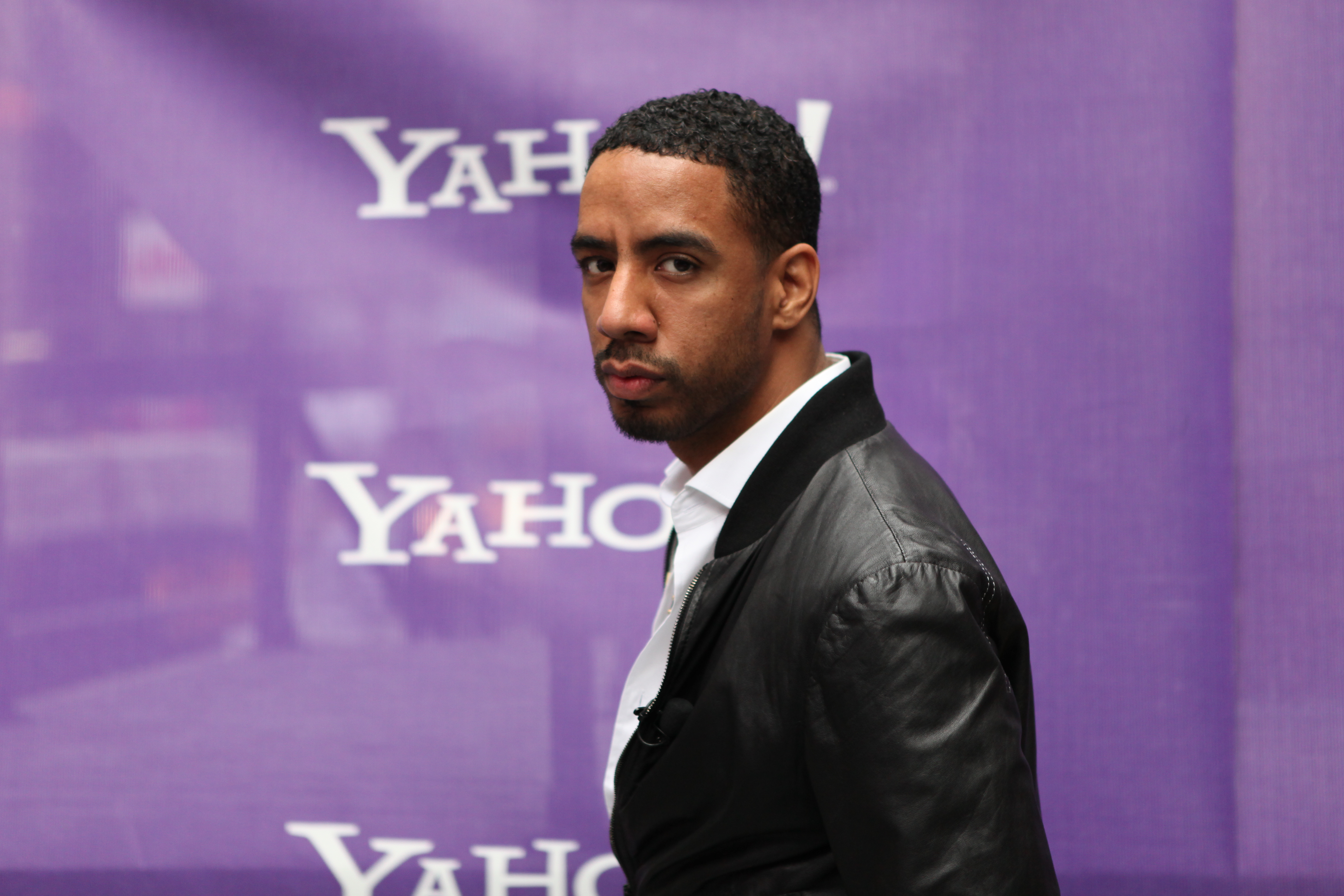
Ryan Leslie composed the song.

AllMusic's Andy Kellman picked "Is It You" as one of the soundtrack album's highlights, saying it "is Cassie's most "pop" song yet, as light as a feather, reliant mostly on a simple combination of handclaps and a fuzzy guitar." In other positive soundtrack reviews, Jessica Dawson of Common Sense Media says the "slow, grinding grooves" can be found on the song describing it "Cassie's sweet and innocent airy pop," while movieXclusive.com's John Li noted the song to be one of "the closest radio-friendly pop songs" featured on it, as the "soulful vocals help to soothe things down a bit." Waqar Hassan of AXS wrote about the track: "The main riff with the distorted sound is a killer on this track," continuing that it "starts to grow on you as discrete notes on the piano start to add into the beat. The "is it you, is it you" part brings the song to a peak."

The Guardian's Alex Macpherson called it a "delightful bubblegum pop song made touchingly human by the hint of tentativeness in Cassie's performance: the slight gasp she gives after the line "I'm looking for someone to share my pain," for instance, as if mindful of the risk she's taking in revealing too much of herself." Pitchfork ranked it at number seventy of the top 100 tracks of 2007, with Tim Finney writing: "Cassie's singing is sweet and understated, the emotive guitar-dominated arrangement is pleasant more than startling, and the song's tangle of hope and uncertainty is instantly familiar," continuing that "it's precisely this which makes "Is It You" such a tantalizing proposition: With every possible obstruction to pop transcendence gently moulded away, we're left only a gleaming paean to the first flush of romance and it's all the more affecting for its modest universality."

== Commercial performance ==
"Is It You" charted in major international territories, such as the United Kingdom at number fifty-two, reaching the top ten of its component R&B chart where it peaked at number ten. It also peaked at number sixty-three on the Scottish Singles Chart. In Australia, the song appeared at number forty-nine on the ARIA Digital Track Chart, which ranks the country's highest selling legally downloaded music tracks. In Canada, it peaked at number eighty-five on the Canadian Hot 100 published weekly by Billboard magazine, and at number sixty-seven on the sales-only based version of the chart called Hot Canadian Digital Songs.

== Music video ==
A music video for the song, directed by the film's director Jon M. Chu, was released on the Step Up 2: The Streets official MySpace page in early February 2008. In the visuals, set in the film's school dance studio, song producer Ryan Leslie begins with an introduction on the piano. Cassie, who plays the character Sophie Donovan in the movie, then begins singing while standing next to the piano. Clips from the film also appear throughout the video.

It was later included as an outtake from Step Up 2: The Streets on its DVD release. Cassie talked about the scene not making the final cut of the film, "we tried to make it so it wasn't like Cassie the artist doing it and I think they took it out. And I'm kinda happy about that because it's hard to differentiate, especially when there are young kids watching it and they're gonna always think that's Cassie on the screen," concluding, "But I don't want it to always be like that, so I'd rather not take the part of being the singer on screen." After her first major film experience, she described music videos with it being "all about you, your personal style and your own attitude and personality" in comparison to a more "intimidating" environment of a movie set working with other actors, "just dialogue that's completely different and you're not really being yourself obviously."

== Track listing ==
- Digital download
1. "Is It You" – 3:57
- CD single
1. "Is It You" – 3:31

== Credits and personnel ==
Credits adapted from AllMusic and the liner notes of Step Up 2: The Streets.

Locations

- Recorded at Paramount Studios, Los Angeles
- Mixed at Legacy Studios, New York City
- Mastered at Sterling Sound, New York City

Personnel

- Cassie – vocals, primary artist
- Scott Elgin – assistant engineer
- Chris Gehringer – mastering
- Ryan Leslie – producer, executive producer, engineer, mixing, composer, programming, instruments
- Gwendolyn Niles – associate executive producer
- P. Diddy – executive producer
- Brent Paschke – co-producer, guitar, composer, engineer
- Harve "Joe Hooker" Pierre – co-executive producer
- Ed Woods – associate executive producer

== Charts ==
Chart (2008)	Peak position
Australia Digital Track Chart (ARIA)	49
Canada (Canadian Hot 100)	85
Hot Canadian Digital Songs (Billboard)	67
Scottish Singles Sales (Official Charts)	63
UK Singles (Official Charts)	52
UK Hip Hop/R&B (Official Charts)	10

== Release history ==
Region	Date	Format	Label
United Kingdom	November 13, 2007	Digital download	Bad Boy; NextSelection; Atlantic
United Kingdom	May 13, 2008	CD single	Bad Boy; NextSelection; Atlantic
