= Must Be Love (Cassie song) =

Single by Cassie featuring Puff Daddy
- Released: April 14, 2009
- Genre: R&B; downtempo
- Length: 4:34
- Label: Bad Boy; NextSelection; Atlantic
- Songwriters: Mario Winans; Sean Combs; Aion Clarke; Leroy Watson; Michael Jones
- Producer: Mario Winans

Cassie singles chronology
"Official Girl" (2008)	"Must Be Love" (2009)	"Let's Get Crazy" (2009)

Puff Daddy singles chronology
"Imma Put It on Her" (2009)	"Must Be Love" (2009)	"Angels" (2009)

"Must Be Love" is a song recorded by American singer Cassie. It features guest vocals by American rapper Puff Daddy, who also co-wrote the song with Aion Clarke, Michael Jones, Leroy Watson and the producer Mario Winans. The song was released for digital download in the United States on April 14, 2009, by Atlantic Records under the Bad Boy imprint, impacting urban radio stations in that region on April 27, 2009.

Cassie stated she had fallen in love with the "soulful R&B record" after it was lingering around in the Bad Boy studios, with demos initially being recorded by other artists, and she immediately wanted the track for herself before having the opportunity to try it out. She considered it an "honor" to have Puff Daddy featured on the song. It was well received by music critics, who complimented its minimalist style recalling Bad Boy Records' classic hit singles of the 1990s.

"Must Be Love" peaked at number fifty-six on the US Billboard R&B/Hip-Hop Songs chart. It received remix versions and was sampled by various artists such as Busta Rhymes, Day26, Trey Songz, J. Cole and Jacques Greene. The song's accompanying music video was directed by Bernard Gourley and features Cassie and Puff Daddy in different sides of a wall from adjacent apartments while performing the record to each other. Cassie appreciated the treatment had a "nice story" that wasn't overdone which she felt added warmth to it allowing Diddy to have a bigger role in the visuals.

== Background and release ==
In 2007, it was revealed that Cassie had begun recording material for her sophomore album. In August 2008, she released a new single "Official Girl," featuring Lil Wayne and produced by Danja. Later that year, she noted being most excited about putting another single and video out before the project's release and "people getting it a bit more every time they see [her]." The album was then scheduled for a spring 2009 release and Cassie talked about its production and mentioned other collaborators also included Pharrell Williams, Darkchild, Kanye West, Ryan Leslie, Bryan-Michael Cox, and Mario Winans. On March 12, 2009, Diddy shared footage from a mixing session with Cassie working on a collaborative track between the two called "Must Be Love," with Diddy referring to it as a "Bad Boy classic." Cassie reacted in an interview stating: "When people say that, it's an honor. I really fought for the record, it was kind of like lingering around in Bad Boy and I was like 'Can I please have it?' They said ok and we tried it out. I really fell in love with that record." The full song, produced by Winans, surfaced online the following day. She elaborated, "I've never like really had a soulful R&B record, something that just gave a good Bad Boy vibe. [...] So I tried it and it worked. Puff got on it, which is really an honor to have him on the record or want to be on the record."

It was made available for digital download on April 14, 2009. That same month Cassie debuted a new look by shaving the right side of her head. Diddy confirmed on his video blog that her new album would be called Electro Love and was slated to be released later that year, with Cassie telling MTV News: "You're definitely going to see more independence [...] a difference in vocals, a little bit more personality. And it's definitely a sensual album." Bad Boy Records serviced it to urban contemporary radio stations on April 27, 2009. Cassie said the track is "about finding yourself in unexpected love and how strong the feeling is, that it takes over you and you can't control it but you love [the feeling]. That's all love should be." She explained why Diddy was credited as Puff Daddy for the release, "It was funny when he was doing the rhyme, when he was recording it, he sounded like himself back in the '90s, so we were like 'that's Puff Daddy,' and so he was like 'alright cool, that's what we're putting on the record'."

== Critical reception ==
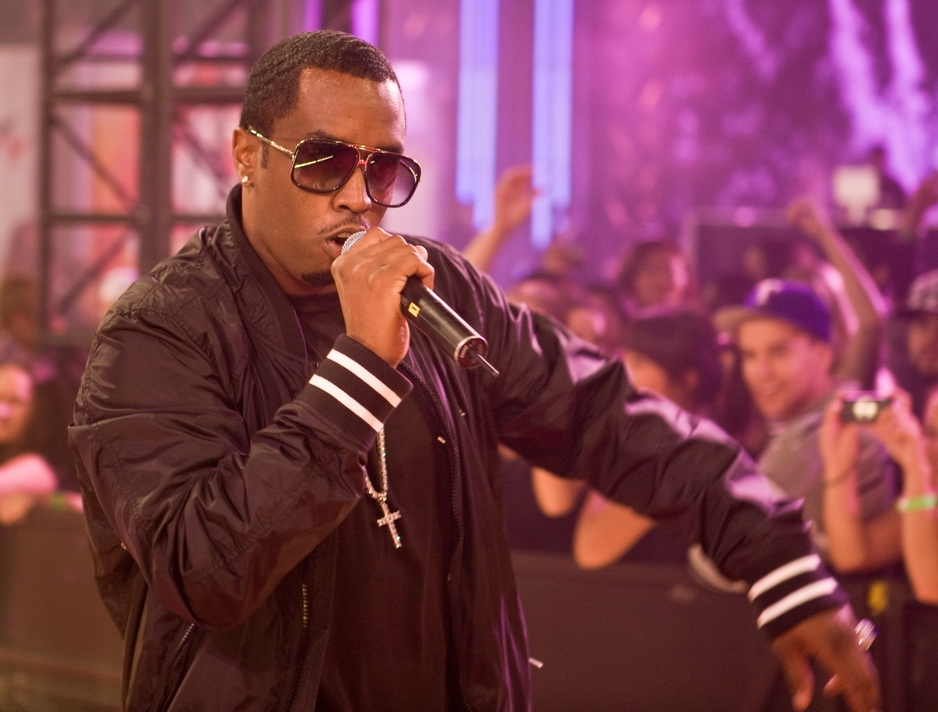
Puff Daddy appears as a featured artist.

Bill Lamb of About.com called Cassie the "queen of minimalist soul" and remarked "Must Be Love" to be almost as "effortlessly catchy" as her debut single "Me & U." He wrote that the "warm guitar" is hypnotic and that "there is just enough of a groove to make you want to move." According to a writer for Rap-Up, the song recalls "Bad Boy circa the '90s," and, at MTV, it was referred to as a "minimal R&B slow-burner with a beat that sounds like rain" and that "[Diddy's] rhymes definitely beef up the track." Tom Lea of Local Action Records stated the song is "pure heartbreak" and praised Cassie's vocal performance, adding: "if the "I think about you all the time" line doesn't make you melt on sight, you've been on the internet too long." Wonderland defined it as being "insidious" and "enchanting."

The Guardian's Eleanor Morgan named "Must Be Love" one of Cassie's "essential tunes" in 2012, describing it as a "flamenco-kissed love-in with Diddy." BET also ranked it one of Cassie's best collaborations, adding "Diddy was so into it that he felt like using his original moniker, "Puff Daddy" for the track. It must really have been love from the start!" Billboard listed it as one of the twenty best love songs by real-life couples in 2014.

== Remixes and other use ==
A remix of "Must Be Love" was released featuring Busta Rhymes, Day26 (who had recorded a demo of the track) and Red Café. N.O.R.E. recorded a remix of the song. Diddy posted his own remix on Twitter in June 2009 saying, "Attn all DJ's! I did a special CLUB remix for Cassie's "Must Be Love" just for you." His club remix is a mashup of the song with The Notorious B.I.G.'s "Gimme the Loot". Aasim (who co-wrote the track) and E Ness recorded their version of the remix. Trey Songz also released a remix of the track during that month. Cassie and Diddy then shared another remix to "Must Be Love" produced by Rob Holladay in late July 2009.

Jacques Greene released his reworked "Marriage Proposal Mix" in December 2010, as a part of Skydiver, a remix compilation album by independent British label Local Action showing appreciation to Cassie, and was later included on Jamie xx’s mix for Benji B on BBC Radio 1. J. Cole freestyled over the song in "Back to the Topic," included on his 2010 mixtape Friday Night Lights. It was also sampled by Snakehips on their version titled "Miss U Always," and by producer Rupert Taylor, otherwise known as xxxy, on "I Know This Can't Be Love," from his 2012 Everything EP. Producer Ed Flis known as Duran Duran Duran released a remix that same year. Riton also shared his remixed version of the song in 2013.

== Music video ==
=== Background and synopsis ===
On May 8, 2009, Diddy stated on his Twitter account he was shooting the "Must Be Love" music video with Cassie. Filming took place at a warehouse in Los Angeles. Earlier that month, it had been revealed Bernard Gourley would be directing. On May 9, Diddy posted behind-the-scenes footage on his YouTube channel. On June 12, the video premiered on MTV.com. More behind-the-scenes content was released that day. Laurieann Gibson choreographed the video with "natural, raw, fluid movements," while Derek Roche styled the performers. Cassie then visited BET's 106 & Park to premiere the video on June 16, 2009.

When Bernard's treatment came in it had so much warmth to it, and a nice story that wasn't overdone so that's how Puff ended up in the video as much as he did – because of the story that Bernard told. It was sold to us in the best way ever.

— Cassie discussing the director's treatment for the Must Be Love video.

In the Gourley-directed visuals, Cassie and Puff Daddy are shown in two separate apartments performing the song to each other through opposite sides of a single wall. In the treatment, the director describes the video concept as "something smoldering and sensual [...] cinematic [...] dripping with desire," set in the middle of a heat wave established with a series of detail shots, creating an intense mood with dramatic lighting. The 2002 wuxia film Hero and Gordon Parks' photographs are used as reference to form this tension while telling the story of "an extraordinarily hot day inside the two adjoining apartments," as the increasing heat throughout "becomes a metaphor for love." The focus of the video are Cassie and Puff Daddy's performances in a "simple but dramatic" setting as they "internalize the desire" verbalized in the song's lyrics, accentuated by the wall separating them which is brought to its combustion point, reaching a climactic moment when smoke and flames start to build around them.

=== Concept and reception ===
Cassie described it as "a very sexy, sensual video but at the same time it's very honest," detailing, "I think as an artist, with every video you grow and you change, and I definitely have changed physically since my last video "Official Girl," and become more of a woman so I'm more comfortable in my own skin and I move differently, so I think that's definitely reflected." Rap-Up wrote that the video featured the "most-talked-about haircut on the Internet," after Cassie created buzz with a new look when she shaved the right side of her head a couple of months prior to its release. She would then be credited in following years with popularizing the half-shaved hairstyle trend among women. Cassie addressed the haircut while on set filming the video: "Recently I just shaved the right side of my head. Everybody thought I was crazy [...] I just woke up one morning and I was ready to do it, it was a very liberating feeling and I almost feel more comfortable and more myself with this hairstyle so I'm glad that I get to debut it in the video."

== Track listing ==
- Digital download
1. "Must Be Love" (featuring Puff Daddy) – 4:34

== Credits and personnel ==
Credits adapted from Qobuz and ASCAP.

- Cassie – vocals, primary artist
- Aion David Clarke – songwriter
- Puff Daddy – vocals, featured artist, songwriter
- Mario Winans – producer, songwriter
- Leroy Watson – songwriter
- Michael Carlos Jones – songwriter
- Kristal Oliver – vocal producer
- Shannon Jones – vocal producer
- Matthew Testa – mixing
- Neal Pogue – mixing
- Steve Dickey – assistant engineer

== Charts ==
Chart (2009)	Peak position
Germany (Deutsche Black Charts)	16
US Hot R&B/Hip-Hop Songs (Billboard)	56

== Release history ==
Country	Date	Format	Label
United States	April 14, 2009	Digital download	Bad Boy; NextSelection; Atlantic
United States	April 27, 2009	Urban radio	Bad Boy; NextSelection; Atlantic
United Kingdom	May 17, 2009	Digital download	Bad Boy; NextSelection; Warner
