= Step Up 2: The Streets (soundtrack) =

Step Up 2: The Streets (Original Motion Picture Soundtrack)
- Soundtrack cover

Soundtrack album by Various artists
- Released: February 5, 2008
- Genres: Hip-hop; dance; R&B
- Length: 60:22
- Label: Atlantic
- Producer: Various artists

Step Up 2: The Streets (Original Motion Picture Soundtrack) is the soundtrack for the 2008 film Step Up 2: The Streets. It was released on February 5, 2008, by Atlantic Records.

The album debuted at number thirteen on the US Billboard 200, and peaked at number five two weeks later. It also reached number one on the US Top Soundtracks chart. The album appeared in various other charts worldwide, including in the top five of countries such as Switzerland, Austria, New Zealand, and Australia, where it peaked at number three on the ARIA Albums Chart, later receiving a Gold certification.

Step Up 2: The Streets featured the US Billboard Hot 100 number one hit single "Low," by rapper Flo Rida featuring hip-hop and R&B artist T-Pain, which helped the soundtrack's commercial performance. Rappers Missy Elliott and Plies both contributed with two tracks to the album. American R&B singers Cassie, Trey Songz, the group Cherish and Spanish singer Enrique Iglesias were also featured in the soundtrack.

== Critical reception ==
Professional ratings
Review scores
Source	Rating
AllMusic	3/5 stars
DJBooth.net	3/5 stars
Common Sense Media	4/5 stars
mX	3/5 stars

"Low"
A 22-second sample of Flo Rida featuring T-Pain's "Low," from Step Up 2 The Streets.

Andy Kellman of AllMusic wrote that the soundtrack is "unsurprisingly, a mixed bag of pop-oriented rap and R&B featuring second-rate tracks from well-known stars, follow-ups from relative newcomers attempting to maintain and increase momentum, and a whole bunch of up-and-comers with early material," selecting Cassie's "Is It You", Cherish's "Killa" and KC's "Say Cheese" as highlights. Nathan S. from DJBooth.net commented "the best part of any decent soundtrack is listening to up-and-comers compete with the big boys, and some of Step Up's best songs come from some decidedly non-major artists," continuing, "it's not exactly a work of art, but it's not supposed to be, it's supposed to be entertaining. If you liked the movie you'll like the soundtrack." John Li of movieXclusive.com opined, "The head-bobbing tunes, the bouncy raps and the heavy rhythms are definitely not for those who like their music lyrical and sweet," noting the closest radio-friendly pop songs are "Is It You" and Trey Songz's "Can't Help But Wait" with the performers' "soulful vocals" heping to "soothe things down a bit."

While reviewing the film for ComingSoon.net, Brad Brevet stated the soundtrack "is filled with music far better than what most dance films have to offer." High-Def Digest reviewer Peter Bracke described "the pounding bass beats and intricate high-end, hip-hop intonations sound fantastic - I'm a fan of any track that hits from all angles and this kept me immersed in the film's key dance sequences." Adam Tyner of DVD Talk said the "Step Up 2: The Streets' soundtrack is all about the music, with hip-hop beats flooding every speaker and backed by a monstrous, room-rattling low-frequency kick." Bob Hoose from Plugged In (publication) selected the soundtrack as a negative element of the movie, "the hip-hop tunes in the soundtrack include repeated—though often hard to make out—references to "booty" and backsides." People picked it as "soundtrack of the week" on their issue dated March 3, 2008, adding that it "gives you plenty of reason to bust a move."

== Track listing ==
No.	Title	Artist(s)	Length
1.	"Low"	Flo Rida featuring T-Pain	3:50
2.	"Shake Your Pom Pom"	Missy Elliott	4:00
3.	"Killa"	Cherish featuring Yung Joc	3:50
4.	"Hypnotized"	Plies featuring Akon	3:08
5.	"Is It You"	Cassie	3:57
6.	"Can't Help But Wait"	Trey Songz featuring Plies	3:24
7.	"Church"	T-Pain	4:00
8.	"Ching-a-Ling"	Missy Elliott	3:38
9.	"Push"	Enrique Iglesias	3:28
10.	"369"	Cupid featuring B.o.B	3:31
11.	"Impossible"	Bayje	4:08
12.	"Lives In Da Club"	Sophia Fresh featuring Jay Lyriq	3:28
13.	"Girl You Know"	Scarface featuring Trey Songz	4:15
14.	"Say Cheese"	Kevin Cossom	4:05
15.	"Let It Go"	Brit & Alex	3:21
16.	"Ain't No Stressin"	Montana Tucker, Sikora and Denial	4:19
Total length:			63:46

Notes

- Other songs such as "Bounce," performed by Timbaland featuring Dr. Dre, Justin Timberlake and Missy Elliott, "The Diary of Jane," by Breaking Benjamin, "Money in the Bank," by Swizz Beatz, "Everything I Can't Have," by Robin Thicke, and "Midnight" by Pitbull featuring Casely among others, also appear in the movie, but weren't featured in the soundtrack album.

== Credits and personnel ==
Credits adapted from AllMusic.

- Akon – primary artist
- Michael Barnett – composer
- Bayje – primary artist
- B.o.B – primary artist
- B.O.B.B.Y. IV – primary artist
- Brandon Bowles – composer
- Brit & Alex – primary artist
- Craig Brockman – instrumentation
- Cassie – primary artist
- Cherish – primary artist
- Desirée Craig-Ramos – soundtrack director
- Cupid – primary artist
- Buck Damon – music supervisor, soundtrack producer
- Denial – primary artist
- Missy Elliott – primary artist
- Mikkel Storleer Eriksen – composer
- Theron "Neff U" Feemster – composer, producer
- Flo Rida – primary artist
- Kaylin Frank – composer
- Enrique Iglesias – composer, primary artist
- Brad Jordan – composer
- Craig Kallman – soundtrack producer
- KC – primary artist
- Fallon King – composer
- Farrah King – composer
- Felisha King – composer
- Pat Kraus – mastering
- Glen Lajeski – composer, marketing, music creative
- Mitchell Leib – executive in charge of music,
  executive of soundtracks, soundtrack producer
- Ryan Leslie – producer
- Jay Lyriq – primary artist
- Tal Miller – mastering
- Steve Morales – composer, producer
- Melissa "Tortuga Wench" Muik – music editor
- Brent Paschke – producer
- Plies – composer, primary artist
- John Regan – design, layout design
- Rodney Richard – composer
- Makeba Riddick – composer
- Craig Rosen – A&R
- Scarface – primary artist
- Adam Shankman – executive soundtrack producer
- Sikora – primary artist
- Rich Skillz – producer
- Sophia Fresh – primary artist
- Tiffany Staton – art manager
- T-Pain – composer, primary artist
- Timbaland – producer
- Trey Songz – primary artist
- Montana Tucker – primary artist
- Teddy Verseti – primary artist
- Don Vito – producer
- Lambert Waldrip – composer
- Kevin Weaver – executive of soundtracks, soundtrack producer
- Young Joc – primary artist

== Charts ==
=== Weekly charts ===
Chart (2008)	Peak position
Australian Albums (ARIA)	3
Austrian Albums (Ö3 Austria)	4
Belgian Albums (Ultratop Flanders)	12
Belgian Albums (Ultratop Wallonia)	72
Canadian Albums (Billboard)	5
Dutch Albums (Album Top 100)	97
French Albums (SNEP)	55
German Albums (Offizielle Top 100)	16
Italian Compilation Albums (FIMI)	5
New Zealand Albums (RMNZ)	4
Swiss Albums (Schweizer Hitparade)	5
UK Compilation Albums (Official Charts)	6
US Billboard 200	5
US Top R&B/Hip-Hop Albums (Billboard)	7
US Soundtrack Albums (Billboard)	1

=== Year-end charts ===
Chart (2008)	Position
Australian Albums (ARIA)	48
Australian Urban Albums (ARIA)	5
Belgian Albums (Ultratop Flanders)	77
Swiss Albums (Schweizer Hitparade)	23
US Billboard 200	146
US Top R&B/Hip-Hop Albums (Billboard)	87
US Soundtrack Albums (Billboard)	16
Chart (2009)	Position
Australian Urban Albums (ARIA)	36

== Certifications ==
Region	Certification	Certified units/sales
Australia (ARIA)	Gold	35,000^{^}
^{^} Shipments figures based on certification alone.
