= Chip tha Ripper discography =

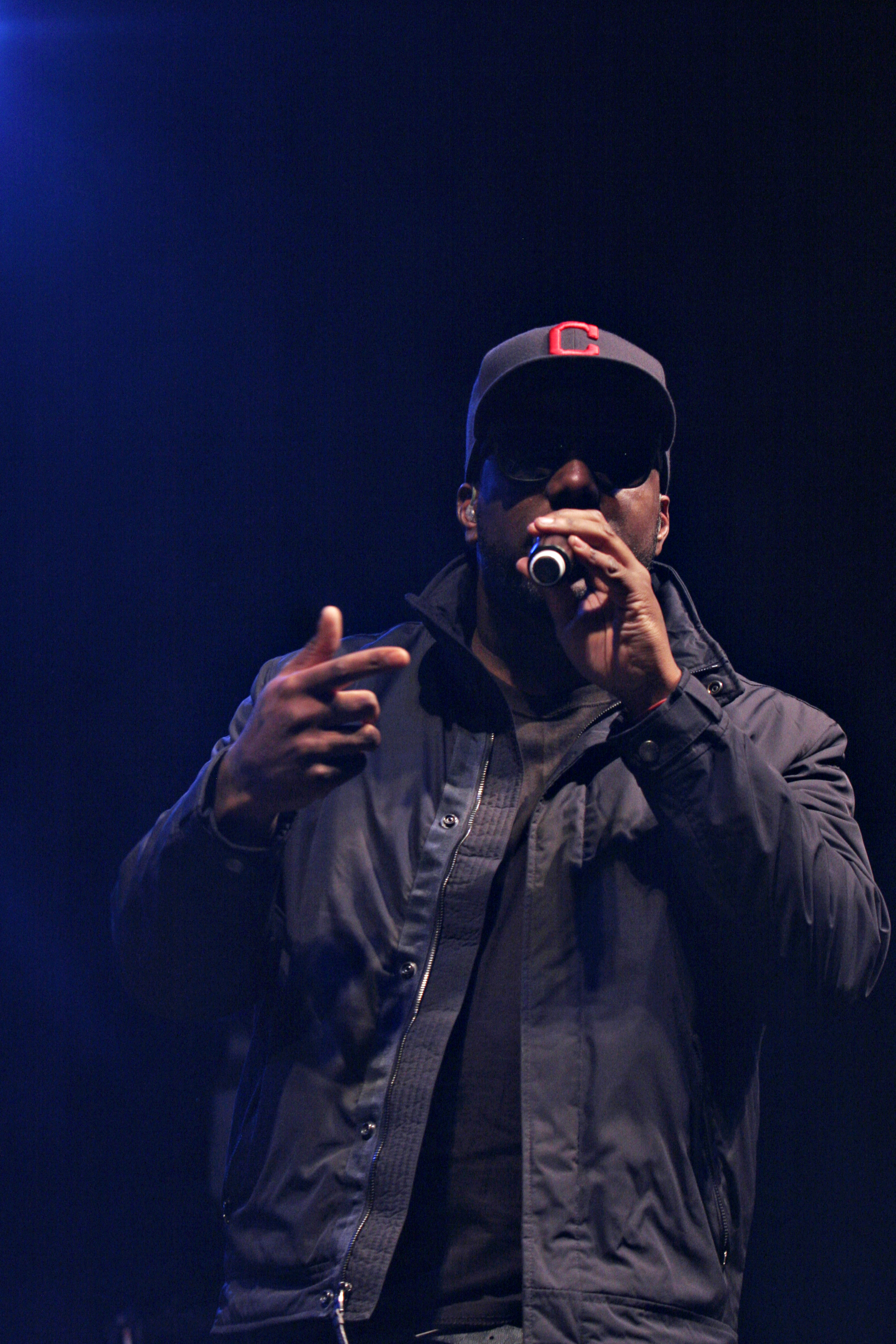
- Chip tha Ripper performing in 2010
- Studio albums: 5
- EPs: 1
- Singles: 14
- Mixtapes: 8

This is the discography for American hip hop recording artist Chip tha Ripper, also known as King Chip.

Chip tha Ripper was part of a collective with fellow Cleveland rapper Kid Cudi called The Almighty GloryUs, as well as part of the supergroup P.O.C. (Pulled Over by the Cops), along with Freddie Gibbs and the Cool Kids.

== Studio albums ==
- Gift Raps (with Chuck Inglish) (2011)
- 44108 (Deluxe) (2014)
- CleveLAfornia (2015)
- Bonfire (with Lex Luger) (2022)
- The Charles Worth LP (2023)

== EPs ==
- From Me to You: The Prelude to Gift Raps (2010)

== Mixtapes ==
- Money (2007)
- Can't Stop Me (2008)
- The Cleveland Show (2009)
- Independence Day (2010)
- Tell Ya Friends (2012)
- 44108 (2013)
- Thornhill (2017)

== Collaborative mixtapes ==
- Double Trouble (with Al Fatz) (2007)

== Singles ==
=== As lead artist ===
List of singles as lead artist, showing year released and album name
| Title | Year | Album |
|---|---|---|
| "Can't Stop Me" (featuring Kid Cudi) | 2009 | Can't Stop Me |
| "Ask About Me" (featuring Kid Cudi) | 2011 | Can't Stop Me |
| "GloryUs" (featuring Kid Cudi) | 2012 | Tell Ya Friends |
| "The Truth" | 2012 | Non-album single |
| "Under Palm Trees" | 2013 | Non-album single |
| "Heinous" (featuring Tezo) | 2013 | Non-album single |
| "WTF I Want To" | 2013 | Non-album single |
| "Lazy and Lucrative" | 2014 | Non-album single |
| "Brand New Hoes" | 2015 | Non-album single |

=== As featured artist ===
List of singles as featured artist, with selected chart positions, showing year released and album name
| Title | Year | Peak chart positions | | | Album |
| Title | Year | US | US R&B | US Rap | Album |
|---|---|---|---|---|---|
| "Just What I Am" (Kid Cudi featuring King Chip) | 2012 | 74 | 17 | 13 | Indicud |
| "I Can't Lose" (H-Flo featuring King Chip) | 2012 | — | — | — | Non-album single |
| "So Slow" (Blended Babies featuring Anderson .Paak and King Chip) | 2015 | — | — | — | The Anderson .Paak EP |
| "Not Me" (Yonni featuring Game, King Chip and Rifah) | 2015 | — | — | — | Non-album single |
| "On Me" (Lil Mussie featuring Chip tha Ripper) | 2020 | — | — | — | Non-album single |
"—" denotes a recording that did not chart or was not released in that territory.

== Guest appearances ==
List of non-single guest appearances, with other performing artists, showing year released and album name
| Title | Year | Other artist(s) | Album |
|---|---|---|---|
| "Ohio All Stars" | 2007 | Hi-Tek, Cross, Showtime, Mann | Hi-Teknology 3 |
| "T.G.I.F." | 2008 | Kid Cudi | A Kid Named Cudi |
| "Mr. Alldatshit" | 2008 | Kidz in the Hall, Donnis | The In Crowd |
| "Jockin'" | 2009 | Donnis, Naledge | —N/a |
| "Hyyerr" | 2009 | Kid Cudi | Man on the Moon: The End of Day |
| "Fresh Academy" | 2010 | Kidz in the Hall, Donnis | Land of Make Believe |
| "Polo Rugby" | 2010 | Skooda Chose | Top Five Material Pt.2 |
| "I Am the Man" | 2010 | Jadakiss, Nipsey Hussle, Mikey Rocks | The Choice Is Yours |
| "Oil Money" | 2010 | Freddie Gibbs, Chuck Inglish, Bun B, Dan Auerbach | Str8 Killa |
| "Five Bucks (5 On It)" | 2010 | Big Sean, Curren$y | Finally Famous Vol. 3: Big |
| "Fat Raps" (Remix) | 2010 | Big Sean, Chuck Inglish, Asher Roth, Dom Kennedy, Boldy James | Finally Famous Vol. 3: Big |
| "The End" | 2010 | Kid Cudi, Nicole Wray, GLC | Man on the Moon II: The Legend of Mr. Rager |
| "Runnin’ My City" | 2010 | Mikkey Halsted, Bun B, Killer Mike, Crooked I, Mistah F.A.B, Gillie da Kid | The Dark Room |
| "Back Home" | 2011 | Mike Posner | —N/a |
| "Roll Call" | 2011 | The Cool Kids, Asher Roth | When Fish Ride Bicycles |
| "Bastermating" | 2011 | Asher Roth, ASAP Twelvyy, YP | Pabst & Jazz |
| "Marsha Braidy" | 2012 | The World Famous Tony Williams, Fonzworth Bentley | Some of My Best Rappers Are Friends |
| "For Seasons" | 2012 | Curren$y | Priest Andretti |
| "Extra Well" | 2012 | Chiddy Bang | —N/a |
| "Busta Ass Nigga" | 2012 | Hit-Boy, Bun B | HITstory |
| "Turned Up" | 2012 | Paypa | The Bottle: Henny on the Rocks 2 |
| "Weed Raps" | 2012 | Smoke DZA | K.O.N.Y |
| "Experimental" | 2012 | Big Sean, Juicy J | Detroit |
| "Yes Lord" | 2012 | Audio Push, Travi$ Scott | Inland Empire |
| "Church" | 2012 | Game, Trey Songz | Jesus Piece |
| "Back Home" | 2012 | Mike Posner | —N/a |
| "Official" | 2013 | Eric Bellinger | —N/a |
| "M.O.B." (Remix) | 2013 | Rocky Diamonds, Tomorrow, Thatguysoda | —N/a |
| "Grow Up" | 2013 | Rolls Royce Rizzy | Grustling 101 |
| "Old English" | 2013 | Travi$ Scott | 44108 |
| "Another You" (Remix) | 2013 | The World Famous Tony Williams, Kanye West, Freddie Gibbs | 44108 |
| "Brothers" | 2013 | Kid Cudi, A$AP Rocky | Indicud |
| "Afterwards (Bring Yo Friends)" | 2013 | Kid Cudi, Michael Bolton | Indicud |
| "Stand Up" | 2013 | —N/a | The L.A. Leakers & L-R-G Present: #LeaksOfTheIndustry |
| "ASAP (Remix)" | 2013 | Eric Bellinger, Hit-Boy | —N/a |
| "They Said" | 2013 | Key Wane, Roscoe Dash, Dusty McFly | Detroit vs. Everybody |
| "Two Kings" | 2013 | Logic | —N/a |
| "Surprise Party" | 2013 | Boldy James, Freeway | My 1st Chemistry Set |
| "Skyscraper" | 2015 | Demrick, Logic | Losing Focus |
| "All Night" | 2016 | Domo Genesis | Genesis |
| "Shout out to the Bay" | 2016 | Riff Raff | Peach Panther |
| "Big Deal" | 2019 | Oba Rowland | Lion King |
