= Chuck Inglish discography =

- Studio albums: 2
- EPs: 2
- Singles: 2
- Collaborative albums: 1
- Mixtapes: 9

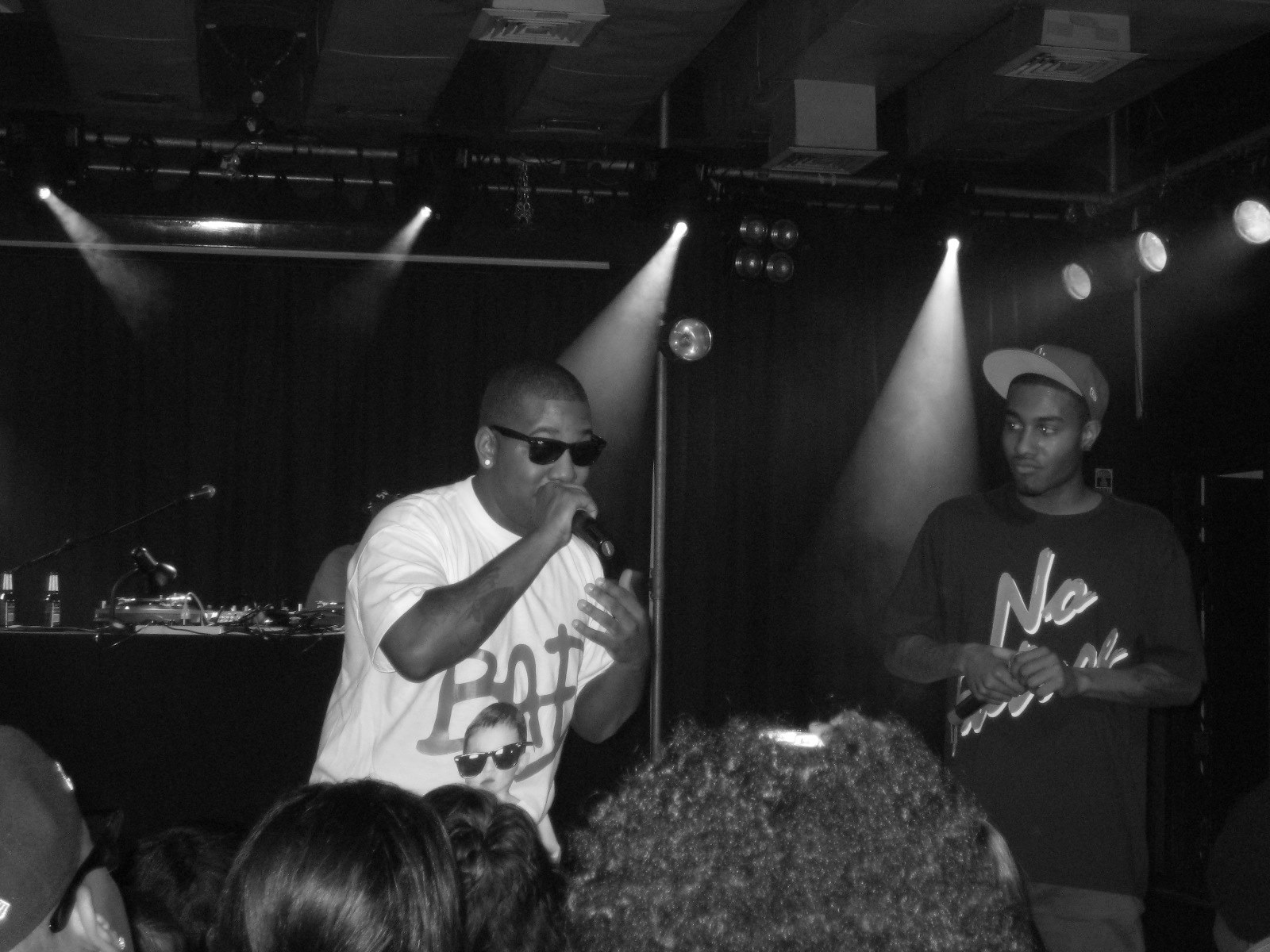
Inglish (left) performing with Sir Michael Rocks in July 2008

This is the discography of American hip hop musician Chuck Inglish.

== Albums ==
=== Studio albums ===
List of studio albums, with selected chart positions
Title	Album details	Peak chart positions		
Title	Album details	US	US R&B	US Rap
Convertibles	Released: April 8, 2014; Label: Sounds Like Fun Records, Federal Prism Records; Formats: CD, digital download	—	24	—
Everybody's Big Brother	Released: October 2, 2015; Label: Sounds Like Fun Records; Formats: CD, digital download	—	—	—
Ev Zeppelin (with Blended Babies)	Released: April 29, 2016; Label: BBMG; Formats: CD, digital download	—	—	—

=== Collaborative albums ===
List of studio albums, with selected chart positions
Title	Album details	Peak chart positions		
Title	Album details	US	US R&B	US Rap
When Fish Ride Bicycles (with The Cool Kids)	Released: July 12, 2011; Label: Green Label Sound, C.A.K.E. Recordings; Formats: CD, digital download	—	—	—

=== Extended plays ===
List of extended plays, with selected chart positions
Title	Album details	Peak chart positions		
Title	Album details	US	US R&B	US Rap
The Bake Sale (with The Cool Kids)	Released: June 10, 2008; Label: XL, Chocolate Industries, C.A.K.E.; Formats: CD, digital download	—	—	—
Easily	Released: October 15, 2013; Label: Sounds Like Fun Records, Federal Prism Records; Formats: CD, digital download	—	—	—

=== Mixtapes ===
List of mixtapes, with year released
Title	Album details
Totally Flossed Out (with The Cool Kids)	Released: 2007; Label: Self-released; Formats: digital download
Cool Ass Ninjas (with The Cool Kids)	Released: April 24, 2008; Label: Self-released; Formats: digital download
That's Stupid (with The Cool Kids)	Released: July 1, 2008; Label: Self-released; Formats: digital download
Gone Fishing (with The Cool Kids)	Released: May 5, 2009; Label: Self-released; Formats: digital download
Merry Christmas (with The Cool Kids)	Released: December 25, 2009; Label: Self-released; Formats: digital download
Tacklebox (with The Cool Kids)	Released: May 31, 2010; Label: Self-released; Formats: digital download
WRKING	Released: January 2, 2012; Label: Self-released; Formats: digital download
WRKOUT	Released: April 23, 2012; Label: Self-released; Formats: digital download
Droptops	Released: June 13, 2013; Label: Self-released; Formats: digital download

== Singles ==
List of singles, with selected chart positions, showing year released and album name
Title	Year	Peak chart positions			Album
Title	Year	US	US R&B	US Rap	Album
"Swervin'" (featuring Polyester The Saint and Sir Michael Rocks)	2013	—	—	—	Convertibles
"Legs" (featuring Chromeo)	2014	—	—	—	Convertibles
"—" denotes a recording that did not chart or was not released in that territory.

=== As featured artist ===
List of singles as featured performer, with selected chart positions showing year released and album name
Title	Year	Peak chart positions			Album
Title	Year	US	US R&B	US Rap	Album
"Oil Money" (Freddie Gibbs featuring Chuck Inglish, Chip tha Ripper, Bun B and Dan Auerbach)	2013	—	—	—	Str8 Killa
"Not Hit Enough" (Jesse Rose & Playmode featuring Chuck Inglish)	2013	—	—	—	—
"See the World" (Blended Babies featuring Asher Roth, Chuck Inglish and ZZ Ward)	2013	—	—	—	—
"Keep Smoking" (Asher Roth featuring Chuck Inglish)	2014	—	—	—	RetroHash
"Can't Jump" (Asher Roth featuring Chuck Inglish)	2019	—	—	—	—
"—" denotes a recording that did not chart or was not released in that territory.
