= Sir Michael Rocks discography =

- Studio albums: 1
- EPs: 2
- Singles: 1
- Collaborative albums: 1
- Mixtapes: 12

This is the discography of American hip hop musician Sir Michael Rocks.

== Albums ==
=== Studio albums ===
List of studio albums, with selected chart positions
Title	Album details	Peak chart positions		
Title	Album details	US	US R&B	US Rap
Banco	Released: July 29, 2014; Label: 6 Cell Phones; Formats: CD, digital download	118	21	13

=== Collaborative albums ===
List of studio albums, with selected chart positions
Title	Album details	Peak chart positions		
Title	Album details	US	US R&B	US Rap
When Fish Ride Bicycles (with The Cool Kids)	Released: July 12, 2011; Label: Green Label Sound, C.A.K.E. Recordings; Formats: CD, digital download	76	16	9

=== Extended plays ===
List of extended plays, with selected chart positions
Title	Album details	Peak chart positions		
Title	Album details	US	US R&B	US Rap
The Bake Sale (with The Cool Kids)	Released: June 10, 2008; Label: XL, Chocolate Industries, C.A.K.E.; Formats: CD, digital download	—	—	—
Populair	Released: September 11, 2015; Label: 6 Cell Phones; Formats: CD, digital download	—	—	—
Part 2	Released: April 8, 2016; Label: 6 Cell Phones; Formats: CD, digital download	—	—	—

=== Mixtapes ===
List of mixtapes, with year released
Title	Album details
Totally Flossed Out (with The Cool Kids)	Released: 2007; Label: Self-released; Formats: digital download
Cool Ass Ninjas (with The Cool Kids)	Released: April 24, 2008; Label: Self-released; Formats: digital download
That's Stupid (with The Cool Kids)	Released: July 1, 2008; Label: Self-released; Formats: digital download
Gone Fishing (with The Cool Kids)	Released: May 5, 2009; Label: Self-released; Formats: digital download
Merry Christmas (with The Cool Kids)	Released: December 25, 2009; Label: Self-released; Formats: digital download
Tacklebox (with The Cool Kids)	Released: May 31, 2010; Label: Self-released; Formats: digital download
The Rocks Report	Released: March 14, 2011; Label: Self-released; Formats: digital download
Premier Politics	Released: October 3, 2011; Label: Self-released; Formats: digital download
Premier Politics 1.5	Released: April 6, 2012; Label: Self-released; Formats: digital download
Lap of Lux	Released: August 2, 2012; Label: Self-released; Formats: digital download
Lap of Lux 1.5	Released: December 6, 2012; Label: Self-released; Formats: digital download
While You Wait...	Released: May 30, 2013; Label: Self-released; Formats: digital download
Funds and Access	Released: 2019; Label: Self-released; Formats: digital download

== Singles ==
List of singles, with selected chart positions, showing year released and album name
Title	Year	Peak chart positions			Album
Title	Year	US	US R&B	US Rap	Album
"Foreign Features"	2010	—	—	—	—
"—" denotes a recording that did not chart or was not released in that territory.

== Guest appearances ==
List of non-single guest appearances, with other performing artists, showing year released and album name
Title	Year	Other artist(s)	Album
"The Hangover"	2010	Currensy	Pilot Talk
"I Am the Man"	2010	Jadakiss, Nipsey Hussle	The Choice Is Yours
"1st Place"	2011	Jet Life, Currensy, Trademark Da Skydiver, Young Roddy	Jet World Order
"Pranks 4 Players"	2011	Mac Miller	I Love Life, Thank You
"New Jeeps"	2011	Dom Kennedy, Asher Roth	From the Westside with Love, II
"Aliens Fighting Robots"	2012	Mac Miller	Macadelic
"Living It Up"	2012	Ski Beatz, Trademark Da Skydiver	24 Hour Karate School Presents Twilight
"Fly Out (Part Tres)"	2012	Currensy, Sean O'Connell, Tabi Bonney	Muscle Car Chronicles
"Round Table Discussion"	2012	Rapsody, Mac Miller, Chuck Inglish	The Idea of Beautiful
"Yes Man"	2012	Kiza Sosay, Omekka	—
"Flickin'"	2013	Calliko, Mic Terror	—
"Practice"	2013	Robb Banks	—
"Swervin'"	2013	Chuck Inglish, Polyester the Saint	Convertibles
"Raw Cypher"	2014	Dizzy Wright, Like, Mod Sun	—
"Riddims 2.0"	2014	Jesse Medina, Ab-Soul, Anya Kvitka	Meet Jesse Medina
"I Wanna Do It"	2014	Freddie Gibbs, The World's Freshest	The Tonite Show
"What Do You Do"	2014	Mac Miller	Faces
"FYE"	2015	Pouya	South Side Slugs
"TTYL" (Remix)	2016	Fat Nick, Suicideboys, Pouya, Robb Banks	When the Lean Runs Out
"Phone"	2016	iLL Chris, Mackned	Honor Thy Father
"Gold High:[7]	2020	A Certain Energy, Bluff Gawd, Sir Michael Rocks	Non-Album Single
