= Sir Michael Rocks =

American rapper (born 1987)

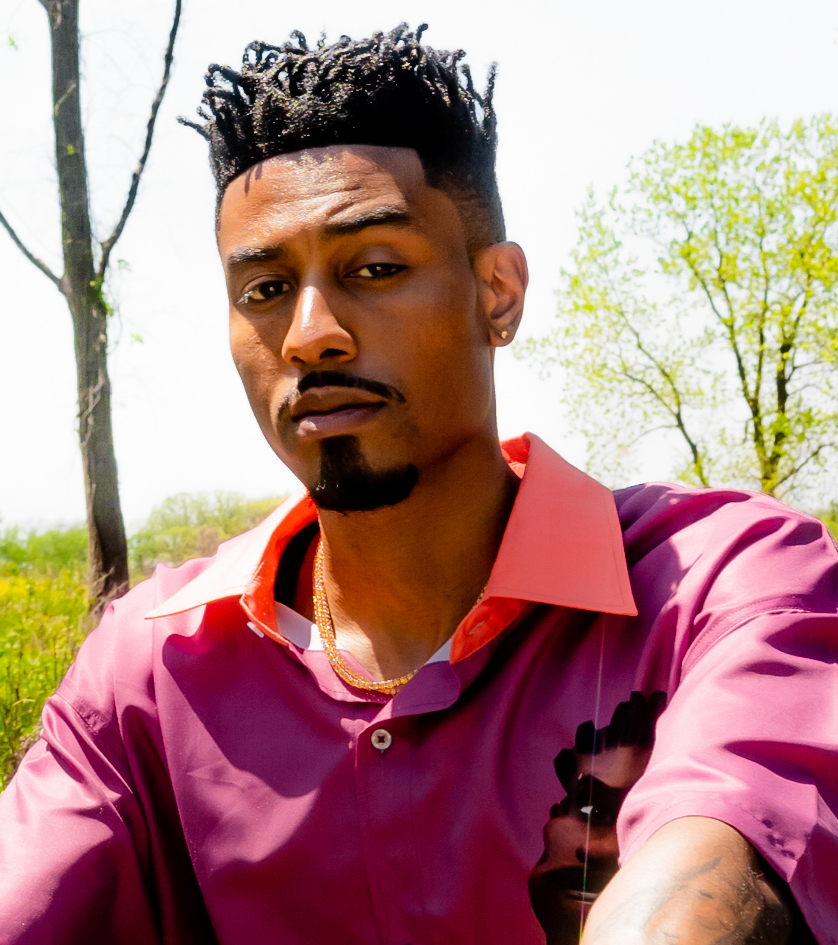
- Sir Michael Rocks in 2023

Background information
- Also known as: Mikey Rocks
- Born: Antoine Amari Reed; December 24, 1987 (age 38); Matteson, Illinois, U.S.
- Genres: Hip hop
- Occupations: Rapper; songwriter; record producer
- Years active: 2007–present
- Labels: 6 Cell Phones; Propelr Music; C.A.K.E.; One Off Music Group; Green Label Sound; Fontana
- Member of: The Cool Kids
- Formerly of: All City Chess Club; P.O.C; The Toothpick Clique

Antoine Amari Reed (born December 24, 1987) is an American rapper better known by his stage name Sir Michael Rocks (or Mikey Rocks). He started his music career in 2005 as a member of the hip hop duo The Cool Kids, and later joined the groups All City Chess Club, the "super group" P.O.C. (Pulled Over by the Cops), and The Toothpick Clique. The Cool Kids released their debut album When Fish Ride Bicycles in 2011, which features production by The Neptunes and artists such as Ghostface Killah. The album peaked at No. 76 on the Billboard 200, and No. 9 on Top Rap Albums.

Starting in 2011, Rocks began releasing a number of free mixtapes. He also contributed as guest artist to tracks by Mac Miller, Dom Kennedy, Jeremih, Curren$y, Freddie Gibbs, Ski Beatz, and more. In April 2014 he contributed to the Chuck Inglish album Convertibles. His first commercial solo album, Banco, was released on July 29, 2014, and features guest appearances by artists such as Too $hort, Mac Miller, Twista, Iamsu, and Pouya.

== Early life ==
Antoine "Sir Michael Rocks" Reed was born in 1987 in the Chicago suburb of Matteson, Illinois, where he was raised. At a young age he listened to artists such as Nas, Jay-Z, Slick Rick, and Eric B. and Rakim, and he started rhyming at the age of ten. Despite an interest in sports, academics, and graphic art, he has stated that even at age ten he knew he would go into hip hop: "I never had a backup plan or plan B. I've always known that this was what I was supposed to be doing. As far as time goes, I've put all my time into it."

As a teenager he began producing his own music, also working on rhymes and making music with friends, including his future collaborators Tris J and Shorty K. He attended Rich South High School and Walter Payton College Prep in Chicago. Beyond music, he had an early interest in zoology, stating he would be specializing in reptile and mammal studies if not rapping. He began producing under the moniker Sir Michael Rocks, also going by Mikey Rocks.

== Music career ==
=== The Cool Kids ===
==== 2005–07: Founding ====
In mid-2005 Rocks was mostly working on music production, and doing some rapping as well. He founded the hip hop duo The Cool Kids when he was still sixteen. He met co-founder Evan "Chuck Inglish" Ingersoll on Myspace in 2005, after Rocks found a beat that Ingersoll had produced. The two met to discuss terms of the beat's sale, and eventually ended up recording for two hours. Stated Inglish, "One day we just met up--I came over to his house with some CDs, and that's all she wrote. We were both, like, searching for each other without searching for each other." They discovered common influences (Outkast, Gorillaz, and 1980s hip hop) and a shared sense of retro fashion.

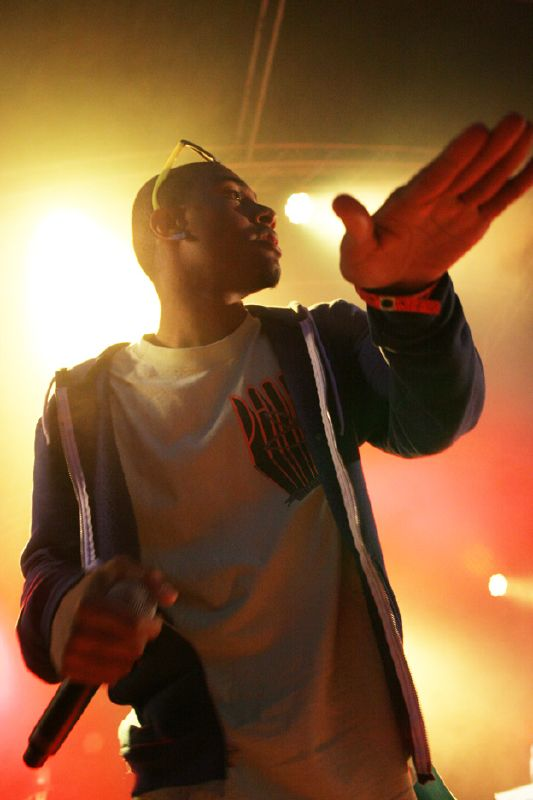
Sir Michael Rocks performing in 2008

Inspired by golden age hip hop and artists like LL Cool J and Eric B. & Rakim, they formed a production duo The Cool Kids that year. The band stated they "originally were only going to make beats and produce for other artists." However, "Rocks himself rapped during a session and wound up as the temporary 'voice' of the Cool Kids", though the two soon began sharing vocal duties.

The group was soon booked by Josh Young of Flosstradamus for a DJ performance, where they encountered DJ Diplo. Diplo offered to release a mixtape of their unreleased tracks titled Totally Flossed Out on his label Mad Decent, though it was eventually released on C.A.K.E. Recordings in 2007 instead. Also in 2007 the group collaborated with Lil Wayne and DJ Benzi through the Internet on a track entitled "Gettin' It".

As of summer 2007 all of their material had been released solely on their MySpace page—their recording contract with Chocolate Industries and C.A.K.E. came after performances at the CMJ Music Festival and Pitchfork Music Festival that July. They were listed in Rolling Stone's Ten Artists to Watch in 2008. According to Rolling Stone, "since "Black Mags" debuted, the Cool Kids have gone from an underground sensation in their native Chicago to the hottest ticket at New York's CMJ festival." In 2007 they opened for M.I.A. on her KALA Tour, and the band performed at the 2008 Rock the Bells hip hop festival.

==== 2008–09: Touring, singles ====
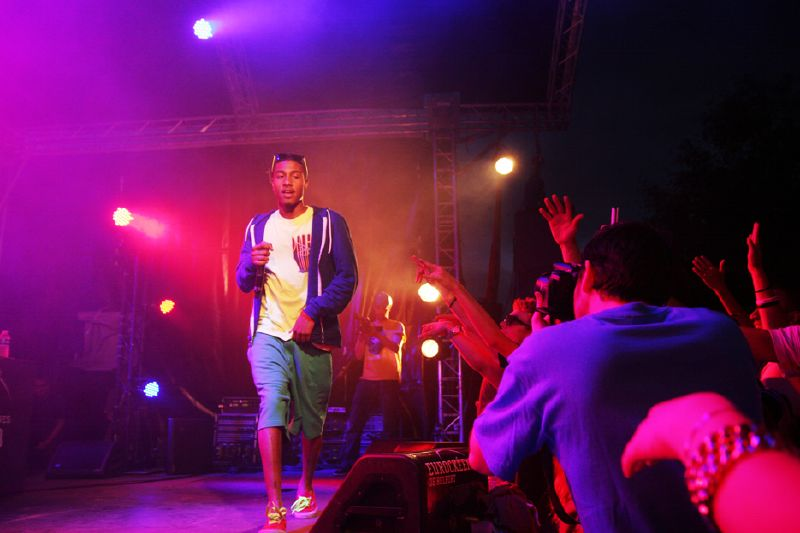
Sir Michael Rocks performing with The Cool Kids in 2008

In January 2008 the duo put up their first for-profit single, selling the track online. Devoted to their love of BMX bikes, "Black Mags" led to a black and white music video, and was featured in a Rhapsody TV commercial along with Sara Bareilles. The group toured across Australia in February 2008 and also appeared at the Laneway Festival. The group also appeared at SUNY Purchase's Culture Shock event in April 2009. Their sophomore EP, The Bake Sale, was their first commercially available disc, released in June 2008. As of 2008, an unofficial bootleg mixtape of their music, titled Totally Flossed Out, was being circulated online.

In August 2008 The Cool Kids became the first hip hop group signed to the Green Label Sound imprint, a label backed by Mountain Dew and devoted only to singles. The duo was then endorsed by Mountain Dew for their single, "Delivery Man", to which commercials and the music video have aired on MTV2. In 2008 they headlined the "NBA 2K Bounce Tour" along with Q-Tip.

Also in 2008, the group had a number of their singles featured in video games and television episodes. They were featured in the video games NBA Live 08 and MLB 2K8 with the song "88", in Need for Speed Nitro, with The Bloody Beetroots in the song "Awesome," and in the episode "The First Cut Is the Deepest" from HBO's TV series Entourage with the song "Mikey Rocks". The group's song "Bassment Party" was featured in the September 21, 2008, episode of the HBO comedy Entourage. They also recorded an original track, "2K Pennies", for the soundtrack of NBA 2K9.

==== 2009–11: Albums ====
The group's second official mixtape, Gone Fishing was released on May 5, 2009. A new mixtape called Tacklebox came out on May 31, 2010. Tacklebox was assembled by the LA Leakers, and featured new singles and "leftovers" from When Fish Ride Bicycles, with freestyles from both members of The Cool Kids. The band also received an offer from the DJ A-Trak to sign to his Fool's Gold Records label, which they did for one single in 2011, titled "Gold and a Pager."

Their debut studio album, When Fish Ride Bicycles, was released July 12, 2011, on Green Label Sound. The album had originally been slated for release in 2009, only to be delayed by legal issues with Chocolate Industries. The album features production by The Neptunes and also features artists such as Bun B, Chip tha Ripper, and Ghostface Killah. The album peaked at No. 76 on the Billboard 200, and No. 9 on Top Rap Albums. The album's song "A Little Bit Cooler" was used in a "Most Valuable Puppets" commercial from Nike with LeBron James and Kobe Bryant entitled "Mrs. Lewis."

=== 2010–11: New groups ===
The Cool Kids are members of the hip-hop collective All City Chess Club founded in 2010. Also in 2010, Mikey Rocks teamed up with Chuck Inglish, Gary, Indiana's Freddie Gibbs and Cleveland's Chip tha Ripper to form the "super group" P.O.C. (Pulled Over by the Cops). The crew had first worked together on the 2010 track "Oil Money" by Freddie Gibbs, and kept working afterwards. Their first single, "Authority", was produced by Blended Babies and featured singer Nate Santos. Around 2011 Rocks co-founded The Toothpick Clique with his friends Tris J and Shorty K, collaborators from his teenage years. They were working on new material as of 2012.

=== 2011–13: Solo mixtapes ===
In 2011 both Rocks and Inglish began working on solo material separate from The Cool Kids. However, they continued to help each other on their various projects and continued to tour together as the band. On March 14, 2011, Sir Michael Rocks released his debut solo album, the Rocks Report mixtape, which featured twenty five original songs and skits. Guest appearances include Like and Mibbs of Pac Div, Sir Charles, and Trademark Da Skydiver, with production by Ski Beatz, Madlib, and others.

This mixtape was followed on October 2, 2011, by Premier Politics. The album features sixteen tracks with Rocks doing most of the writing on all. About the production process, Rocks stated "It didn't take too long because I'm a studio rat, so I'll be in the lab for 2 weeks straight, 10 hours a day, and just grind out non-stop." A number of different producers besides Rocks contributed, including the Alchemist. He also released a collection of sweatshirts and T-shirts with the release of the Premier Politics, promoting various independent designers.

On October 23, 2011, it was announced that Rocks joined forces with the independent label Jet Life Recordings, a Warner Bros. imprint owned by fellow rap artist Curren$y, whom Rocks had first befriended over Myspace around 2008. Rocks appeared as a featured artist on a number of the albums released by the label. In 2011, this included "1st Place" (featuring Currensy, Trademark Da Skydiver, Young Roddy & Mikey Rocks), which appeared on the album Jet World Order. Rocks toured in late 2011 on the Smoker's Club Tour, which featured Curren$y, Method Man, Smoke DZA and Big K.R.I.T. While working on solo material he also continued to work on music with The Cool Kids.

On April 6, 2012, he released the mixtape Premier Politics 1.5, which included songs he'd originally intended for Premier Politics. Contributing producers and featured artists included Cardo, Tye Hill, Brandun DeShay, Cookin' Soul, Like, his close friend Tris J, Shorty K, and Chuck Inglish. As stated in Hot New Hip Hop, "Sir Michael Rocks's future brightens with every new release, and Premier Politics 1.5 certainly isn't an exception. It's a fitting addition to a solid catalogue."

His mixtape Lap of Lux was released on August 2, 2012. Lap of Lux feature appearances from Mac Miller, Rockie Fresh, and Casey Veggies along with production from Hit-Boy and Inglish. For the Lap of Lux track "Reservations" he collaborated with actress and singer Teyana Taylor to shoot a music video, which later premiered on MTV in December 2012. He toured in the fall of 2012 with Mac Miller, and for the second part of the year toured with Pac Div. Rocks released an 8-track follow-up mixtape, Lap of Lux 1.5, in December 2012, with producer Harry Fraud also contributing.

Stated Hip Hop Vibe in February 2013, "Though he is overlooked in the wake of Chief Keef, Rockie Fresh, and Lil Reese, it is highly likely that Sir Michael Rocks is Chicago's biggest newer artist. He performed at SXSW 2013 in Austin, having performed at the festival annually since 2007. As of February 2013 he was associated with but not signed to Jet Life Recordings, instead remaining independent. On May 30, 2013, he released the mixtape While You Wait..., a ten track project with guest appearances by artists such as Ab-Soul, Mac Miller, and Larry Fisherman, who also contributed to production.

=== 2013–17: Banco, Guest Appearances ===
His debut album Banco was released on July 29, 2014. The album features guest appearances from Twista, Casey Veggies, Iamsu!, Mac Miller, Trinidad James, Too Short and Chuck Inglish.

Rocks continues to be active as a guest artist, and he has contributed to tracks by artists such as Dom Kennedy, Ski Beatz, Sean O'Connell, Curren$y, Rapsody, Dizzy Wright, Freddie Gibbs, and The World's Freshest. In April 2014 he contributed to the Chuck Inglish album Convertibles, which was preceded by three singles – one of which was "Swervin'" featuring Rocks and Polyester the Saint.

Rocks appeared on Famsquadilliana's Sport Coat Willie project alongside Tuki Carter on "I Get It" and the remix of their record "I Get Me Me".

=== 2018–19: Mystery School & Livestream ===
Entering a new musical era. The artist has linked up with Owen Bones to create a new group called MYSTERY SCHOOL to form an experimental electronic hip-hop duo. In February 2019, they released their self-titled debut EP, Mystery School. The campaign leading up to this release consisted of Owen Bones and Sir Michael Rocks on Twitch for "Sudden Death" segments, where they gave themselves half an hour to create a beat from scratch with at least one verse on it.

== Style and genre ==
=== Equipment ===
As a music producer, Rocks has been known to use the music software program Reason from Propellerhead Software.

=== Sound, lyrics and influences ===
"[Growing up] Ilistened to 'Pac and Slick Rick and all that, but I don't think that's my biggest influence... It's not really about me getting inspiration from other rappers and stuff, 'cause I don't really sound like anybody... other people I know, and my friends, and other smart people, and just learning more about myself and the world and how people work and stuff, I think that's like more where I pull my raps from."
— Sir Michael Rocks (2012)

Stated by Hot New Hip Hop in May 2012, "His laidback flow is definitely a good fit for Curren$y's Jet Life Recordings... but you really can't compare Mikey Rocks to other rappers because his flow and sound are so different from what is constantly heard nowadays; staying with the fresh theme, listening to Sir Michael Rocks' rap is like a breath of fresh air." He stated in late 2012 about his rhymes, "I just write something that I or my friends would listen to. Nine out of ten times if we like it, other people will fuck with it."

=== Genres ===
Sir Michael Rocks has referenced local Chicago rappers as influences on his sound. Stated Rocks in 2011, "of course, [Chicago] classics like Twista, Crucial Conflict, Kanye, Common and Lupe was a big influence on what I am doing now. A lot of Chicago music has definitely raised me to be who I am." Stated Chicago Reader in 2007, "Over the past year and a half, a new crowd of omnivorous, beat-obsessive DJs and rappers--Flosstradamus, Kid Sister, Hollywood Holt, The Cool Kids [with Sir Michael Rocks], Mano--has done what nobody's managed to do in years: developed what you could conceivably call a Chicago hip-hop sound. It takes cues from the indie-rock-influenced hipster dance scene, relying more on four-on-the-floor club rhythms from juke and house than the languid, syncopated beats common in mainstream hip-hop. And it borrows some of the most appealing elements from the other major regional styles: the screwed vocals of Houston hip-hop, the good-natured rowdiness of Dirty South crunk, and the playful, casual attitude of Bay Area hyphy, with its rhymes about hanging out, dressing up for the club, and gettin' retarded."

=== Fashion ===
As of September 2012, Rocks was the face of the clothing line Marriani. The brand describes itself as having "always been inspired by urban, black designers, and Chicago fashion of the late 1990s and early 2000s". In an interview with magazine Ruby Hornet, Mac Miller said The Cool Kids deserved more credit "for what they've done in style, music, and fashion". According to All Hip Hop in 2012, "All gold everything, Retro J's, and a Neiman Marcus wardrobe – these are all things hot in popular hip-hop fashion culture today, but nothing that is extremely new. In 2007, The Cool Kids strutted out all of the above fashion trends and rocked it all years before it was mentioned in recent songs. There is no doubt that Sir Michael Rocks and Chuck Inglish pioneered modern swag." Rocks announced the official relaunch of Marriani in 2022.

== Personal life ==
As of May 2012, Sir Michael Rocks was dividing his time between Chicago and Los Angeles.

== Discography ==
=== Studio albums ===
- Banco (2014)
- Broken Window of Opportunity (2020)

=== Mixtapes ===
- The Rocks Report (2011)
- Premier Politics (2011)
- Lap of Lux (2012)
- While You Wait... (2013)

=== Extended plays ===
- Populair (2015)
- Populair Pt.2 (2016)

=== Collaborations ===
The Cool Kids

- The Bake Sale (EP, 2008)
- Gone Fishing (Mixtape, 2009)
- Tacklebox (Mixtape, 2010)
- When Fish Ride Bicycles (Album, 2011)
- Special Edition Grandmaster Deluxe (Album, 2017)
- The Cool Kids Before Shit Got Weird (Album, 2022)
- Baby Oil Staircase/Chillout (Album, 2022)

Features/Guest Appearances

== Guest appearances ==
List of non-single guest appearances, with other performing artists, showing year released and album name
Title	Year	Other artist(s)	Album
"The Hangover"	2010	Currensy	Pilot Talk
"I Am the Man"	2010	Jadakiss, Nipsey Hussle	The Choice Is Yours
"1st Place"	2011	Jet Life, Currensy, Trademark Da Skydiver, Young Roddy	Jet World Order
"Pranks 4 Players"	2011	Mac Miller	I Love Life, Thank You
"New Jeeps"	2011	Dom Kennedy, Asher Roth	From the Westside with Love, II
"Aliens Fighting Robots"	2012	Mac Miller	Macadelic
"Living It Up"	2012	Ski Beatz, Trademark Da Skydiver	24 Hour Karate School Presents Twilight
"Fly Out (Part Tres)"	2012	Currensy, Sean O'Connell, Tabi Bonney	Muscle Car Chronicles
"Round Table Discussion"	2012	Rapsody, Mac Miller, Chuck Inglish	The Idea of Beautiful
"Yes Man"	2012	Kiza Sosay, Omekka	—N/a
"Flickin'"	2013	Calliko, Mic Terror	—N/a
"Practice"	2013	Robb Banks	—N/a
"Swervin'"	2013	Chuck Inglish, Polyester the Saint	Convertibles
"Raw Cypher"	2014	Dizzy Wright, Like, Mod Sun	—N/a
"Riddims 2.0"	2014	Jesse Medina, Ab-Soul, Anya Kvitka	Meet Jesse Medina
"I Wanna Do It"	2014	Freddie Gibbs, The World's Freshest	The Tonite Show
"What Do You Do"	2014	Mac Miller	Faces
"FYE"	2015	Pouya	South Side Slugs
"TTYL" (Remix)	2016	Fat Nick, Suicideboys, Pouya, Robb Banks	When the Lean Runs Out
"Phone"	2016	iLL Chris, Mackned	Honor Thy Father
"Gold High:[79]	2020	A Certain Energy, Bluff Gawd, Sir Michael Rocks	Non-Album Single
