= Naledge =

American rapper

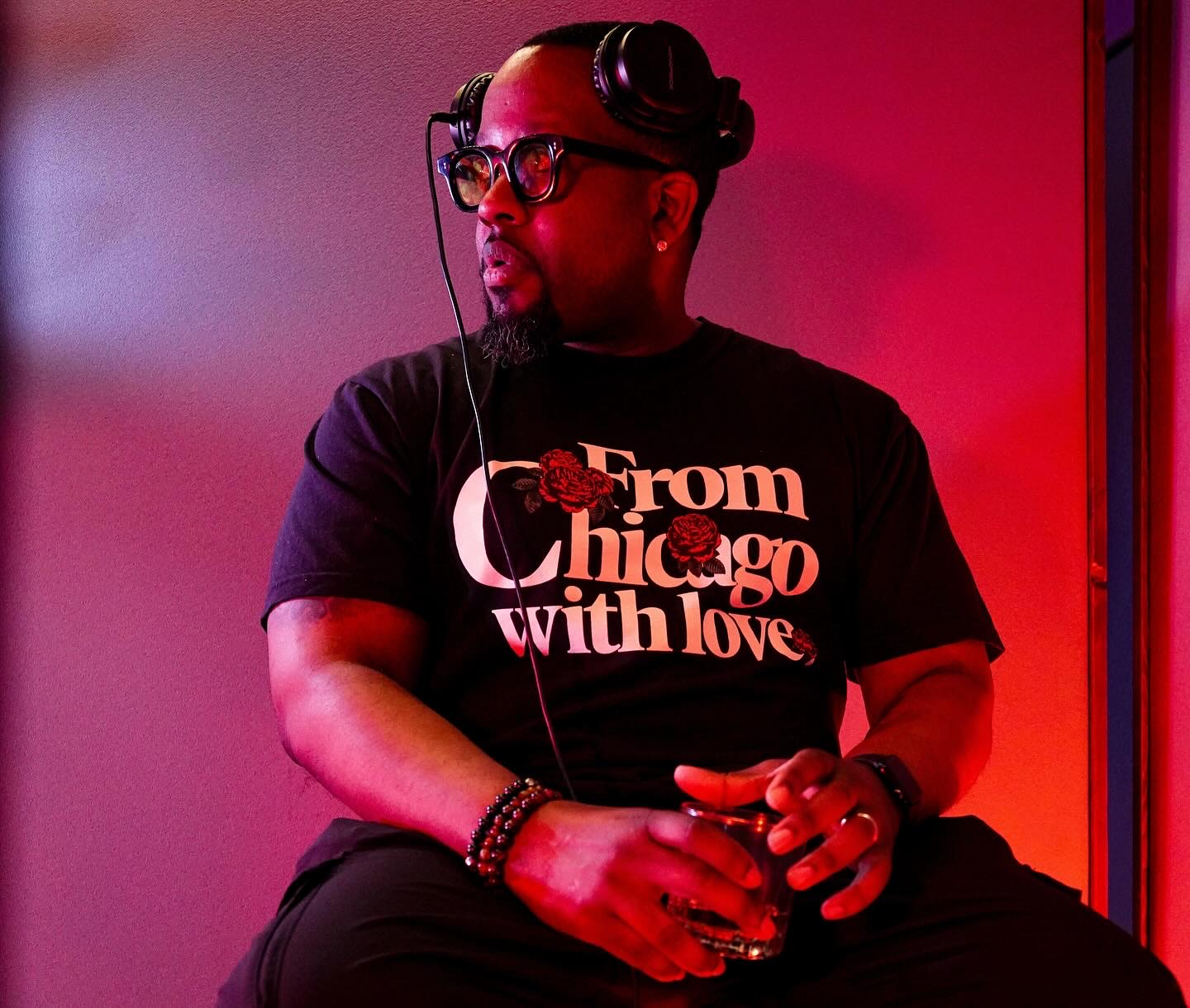

Background information
- Born: Jabari Miles Evans; September 10, 1983 (age 43); Chicago, Illinois, U.S.
- Origin: Chicago, Illinois, U.S.
- Genre: Hip hop
- Occupations: Rapper
- Years active: 2000–present
- Labels: Rawkus Records (2006–2007); Duck Down Records (2007–present)
- Website: www.naledge.com

Jabari Miles Evans, better known by his stage name Naledge, is an American rapper and one half of the hip-hop duo Kidz in the Hall. He is also an assistant professor of Race and Media at the University of South Carolina in School of Journalism and Mass Communication. In 2012, Naledge created a company, a platform for local artists to share their work.

== Life and career ==
=== Early life ===
Evans grew up in the South Side neighborhood of Chicago. The son of mental health experts, Dr. Robert Evans and Dr. Helen Evans, Naledge displayed lyrical ability at an early age and by fourteen he had become a member of a local Chicago-based rap group called FFC (Famous From the Chi). In addition to his early musical accomplishments, he demonstrated an interest in academics, writing and publishing a book entitled “The Straight Jab” at the age of 16. Upon his graduation from Luther High School South, he attended the University of Pennsylvania, where he majored in Communications with a minor in Sociology. At Penn, Naledge became a member of the Kappa Alpha Psi fraternity. While attending college he met classmate Michael Aguilar, a hip-hop producer now known as Double-O. The two began working together and formed the hip-hop group Kidz in the Hall.

=== Kidz in the Hall ===
Upon Naledge's graduation from the University of Pennsylvania in 2004, he and Double-O signed with Rawkus Records and in 2006 released their first album, School Was My Hustle.

In early 2007, Kidz in the Hall created a song entitled "Work To Do" in support of democratic presidential nominee Barack Obama, who has ties to Naledge's hometown of Chicago. They were among the first artists to support Obama in their music. The song features a sample from The Main Ingredient's version of The Isley Brothers original of the same name.

In November 2007, Kidz in the Hall were officially signed to Duck Down Records, an independent label started by founding members of the Boot Camp Clik. The duo's second album, The In Crowd, was released in May 2008, with the lead single "Drivin' Down the Block," which samples Masta Ace's song "Born to Roll" for the hook and contains an interpolation of Outkast's "Elevators (Me & You)" on the bridge. Many other tracks on the album use samples and interpolations of early 1990s hip hop, including their song "Snob Hop" featuring Camp Lo which uses the hook from Black Sheep's song "Flava of the Month" for the chorus. Their song "Blackout" was featured on the soundtrack of Madden '09. The group's most recent album Land of Make Believe was released on March 9, 2010, and features guests MC Lyte, Just Blaze, Chip tha Ripper, Donnis, Amanda Diva and co-production by Just Blaze and Picnic Tyme. The album was declared the most "commercially viable" album the group has made thus far and received an XL rating in XXL Magazine.

=== Solo career ===
Naledge is also planning to come out with a solo album in the near future. He was quoted by rap website Hiphopdx, "My solo album is still in the process of being put together. I’ve been busy with shows, but I have some tracks in the works," says the rising MC. "I got beats from 9th Wonder, Black Milk, Double-O, Pete Rock and [two or three from] Just Blaze. Just Blaze has been my ‘yes man,’ okaying tracks for the album."

Naledge has released solo work in the past, having dropped the mixtape Chicago Picasso on June 30, 2009. The mixtape was in anticipation of the release of his solo album. It was hosted by Mick Boogie RTC and DJ Timbuck2, and featured guest artists include Chip Tha Ripper, Jay Electronica, Mickey Factz, Bun B, Curren$y, with production by Double-O, Analogic, Picnic Tyme, Nez & Rio, and many others. The first single off the mixtape, entitled “Star Struck” (produced by Sa-Ra and featuring Rus Soul), was released on May 6, 2009.

In June 2009, Naledge was featured in Chicago Magazine as one of the city's top singles.

In September 2010, Naledge announced on his Facebook Page and Twitter account the release of his second upcoming mixtape " Twentysomething LP" hosted by DJ Moondawg on September 10, 2010. He also announced an exclusive preview of his mixtape on iTunes on September 7.

In 2012, Naledge has created his company (Brainiac Society), with hope of helping local artists have a creative outlet to have their work heard. Aside from music, Naledge frequently speaks as guest lecturer at high schools, colleges and universities in the Chicago area and he is committed to doing community service within around the South Side area where he was raised.(link) Additionally, Naledge is a graduate of the University of Southern California School of Social Work (link) and earned his PhD at Northwestern University's Media, Technology and Society program, where he was a research associate at the Center on Media and Human Development. He is also a past selection for the PhD Research Internship at Microsoft’s Social Media Collective in Cambridge, Massachusetts. Naledge is currently an Assistant Professor of Race and Media at the University of South Carolina in the School of Journalism and Mass Communication and Affiliate Faculty at the Rebooting Social Media Institute within the Berkman Klein Center for Internet and Society at Harvard University.

== Discography ==
=== Mixtapes ===
- Will Rap for Food: The Mixtape (2006)
- The Crown Jewel (2007)
- Chicago Picasso (June 30, 2009)
- Naledge Is Twenty Something (September 10, 2010)
- Night at the Elysian (with Tony Baines) (2012)
- Chicago Picasso 2 (2012)
- Brain Power (2013)
- Brain Power 2 (2014)
- Chicago Picasso 3 (2017)
- Twenty Something 2 (with DJ Moondwag)

=== As featured artist ===
- 2004: "Love Me" (Just Blaze remix) (Janet Jackson featuring Naledge)
- 2012: "Stand Up" (Yung Berg featuring Naledge)
- 2012: "The Sandlot" (Jordan Hollywood & Yung Berg featuring Naledge)
- 2012: "Nah Mean?" (A.J. Crew featuring Naledge)
- 2016: "That N**** Ain't Do Nothing" (Yung Berg featuring Naledge)

== Books ==
- Drill Rap, Sex Work and the Digital Underground: (Clout)chasing on Chicago's Southside. Langham, MD: Rowman and Littlefield. 2024 ISBN 978-1-6669-0997-5
- Hip-Hop Civics: Connected Learning in the Rap Classroom. Ann Arbor, MI: University of Michigan Press ISBN 978-0-472-05717-7
