= Broken Window of Opportunity =

Studio album by Sir Michael Rocks
- Released: January 17, 2020
- Recorded: 2018–2020
- Genre: Hip hop
- Length: 40:00
- Label: Propelr Music
- Producer: Tye Hill; The WatcherZ; Chuck Inglish; Ziptopher; JuniorChef; Sunny Norway; Squatch

Sir Michael Rocks chronology
| Populair Pt 2 (2016) | Broken Window of Opportunity (2020) |

Broken Window of Opportunity is a 2020 album by American rapper Sir Michael Rocks. The album features contributions from artists such as Shorty K and Mickey Factz. The production was handled by Tye Hill, The WatcherZ, Ziptopher, JuniorChef, Sunny Norway, and Squatch, complementing Rocks' lyrics with a mix of propulsive and atmospheric beats. Chuck Inglish contributed production to the tracks "Ice Skate" and "Punchin'".

== Release and promotion ==
The release and promotion of Sir Michael Rocks' album Broken Window of Opportunity in January 2020 were characterized by minimal promotional efforts.

The album's thirteen tracks showcased a variety of sounds, from mainstream trap to boom bap style raps, all imbued with Rocks' playful lyricism and vibrant production. The project highlighted his quirky rhymes and eccentric ear for beats, continuing his tradition of infusing his music with a distinct personality.

== Critical response ==
The Lyrical Lemonade review of Broken Window of Opportunity highlighted the album's diverse musical range, from R&B vibes to rap bars. The reviewer particularly enjoyed the tracks "Ice Skate" and "Exotica Maximum" for their distinctiveness and overall contribution to the project's strength.

HipHopWired's review emphasized the album's consistent quality, noting Rocks' return to form as a style innovator. While pointing out the album's lack of tempo variation as its only drawback, the review celebrated Rocks' smooth delivery and the reflective depth of tracks like "Sometimes," positioning the album among the best early releases of 2020.

== Track listing ==
| No. | Title | Length |
|---|---|---|
| 1. | "Open the Vault" | 3:52 |
| 2. | "Mo Money" (featuring Shorty K) | 3:36 |
| 3. | "Art Show" (featuring Mickey Factz) | 3:10 |
| 4. | "You Can Do It" | 2:34 |
| 5. | "Ice Skate" | 2:59 |
| 6. | "Can't Call It" | 3:12 |
| 7. | "Punchin'" | 2:32 |
| 8. | "No Me Toca" | 2:51 |
| 9. | "First I" | 2:44 |
| 10. | "Exotica Maximum" | 3:24 |
| 11. | "Overload" | 2:49 |
| 12. | "Tryna Hide" | 3:26 |
| 13. | "Sometimes" | 3:29 |
| Total length: | | 40:00 |
