= Tackle box =

tackle box or tacklebox may refer to:

- Tackle box (fishing), a box designed for fishing equipment
- Tackle box (American football), the area between where the two offensive tackles line up prior to the snap
- Tacklebox, 2006 collection of multi-track demos by Ty Tabor
- Tacklebox (mixtape), the 2010 mixtape by Midwest rap duo The Cool Kids
