= Special Edition Grandmaster Deluxe =

Studio album by The Cool Kids
- Released: September 15, 2017
- Recorded: 2016–2017
- Genre: Hip-hop
- Length: 65:18
- Label: Propelr Music; C.A.K.E. Recordings
- Producer: Chuck Inglish

The Cool Kids chronology
When Fish Ride Bicycles (2011)	Special Edition; Grandmaster Deluxe (2017)

Singles from The Cool Kids
- 1. "TV Dinner" Released: March 27, 2017

Special Edition Grandmaster Deluxe is the second studio album by The Cool Kids. It was released on September 15, 2017, through Propelr Music and C.A.K.E. Recordings. The album's launch marked the duo's return to the music scene after a six-year hiatus. The project features appearances from Hannibal Burress, Travis Barker, HXLT, Boldy James, Smoke DZA, Jeremih, Buddy, Jay Worthy, Warm Brew, Anthony Pavel, Ye Ali, A-Trak, Larry June, Reese Laflare, Quin, Syd, Helios Hussain, Joyce Wrice and Like.

== Critical response ==
Professional ratings
Review scores
Source	Rating
The Ringer	Positive
Hype Of Life	Positive
HipHopDX	3.9/5 stars
Genius	Positive

"Special Edition Grandmaster Deluxe," is generally regarded as a creative and innovative work. It stands out for its eclectic sound and the effective incorporation of various guest artists, which contributes to its dynamic and varied nature. The album is appreciated for maintaining the duo's unique style while exploring new musical avenues, marking a successful return after their hiatus.

The review of "Special Edition Grandmaster Deluxe" by The Cool Kids on HipHopDX appreciates the album's uniqueness and its appeal to true fans of the duo. The album is described as a roller coaster ride, produced entirely by Chuck Inglish. It highlights tracks like "The Moonlanding" and "Westside Connections" for their distinct styles and sounds. The review notes that while the album may lack cohesiveness due to its eclectic nature, it showcases the duo's coolness and their ability to do what they want creatively.

== Track listing ==
All tracks produced by Chuck Inglish.

No.	Title	Length
1.	"The Moonlanding" (featuring Hannibal Burress)	4:31
2.	"TV Dinner"	3:28
3.	"Get Out The Bowl" (featuring Travis Barker and HXLT)	2:39
4.	"Break Your Legs"	3:15
5.	"20/20 Vision"	2:12
6.	"Checkout"	4:09
7.	"On The Set" (featuring Boldy James and Smoke DZA)	1:35
8.	"9:15PM" (featuring Jeremih)	2:42
9.	"Westside Connections" (featuring Buddy, Jay Worthy and Warm Brew)	4:22
10.	"The Motion" (featuring Anthony Pavel and Ye Ali)	3:19
11.	"T.D.A." (featuring A-Trak, Larry June and Reese Laflare)	3:16
12.	"Jean Jacket"	3:21
13.	"Simple Things" (featuring Quin and Syd)	3:10
14.	"Symptons Of A Down" (featuring Helios Hussain)	3:09
15.	"Gr8full" (featuring Joyce Wrice and Like)	3:27
16.	"Francois"	3:27
Total length:		65:00
