= Double-O =

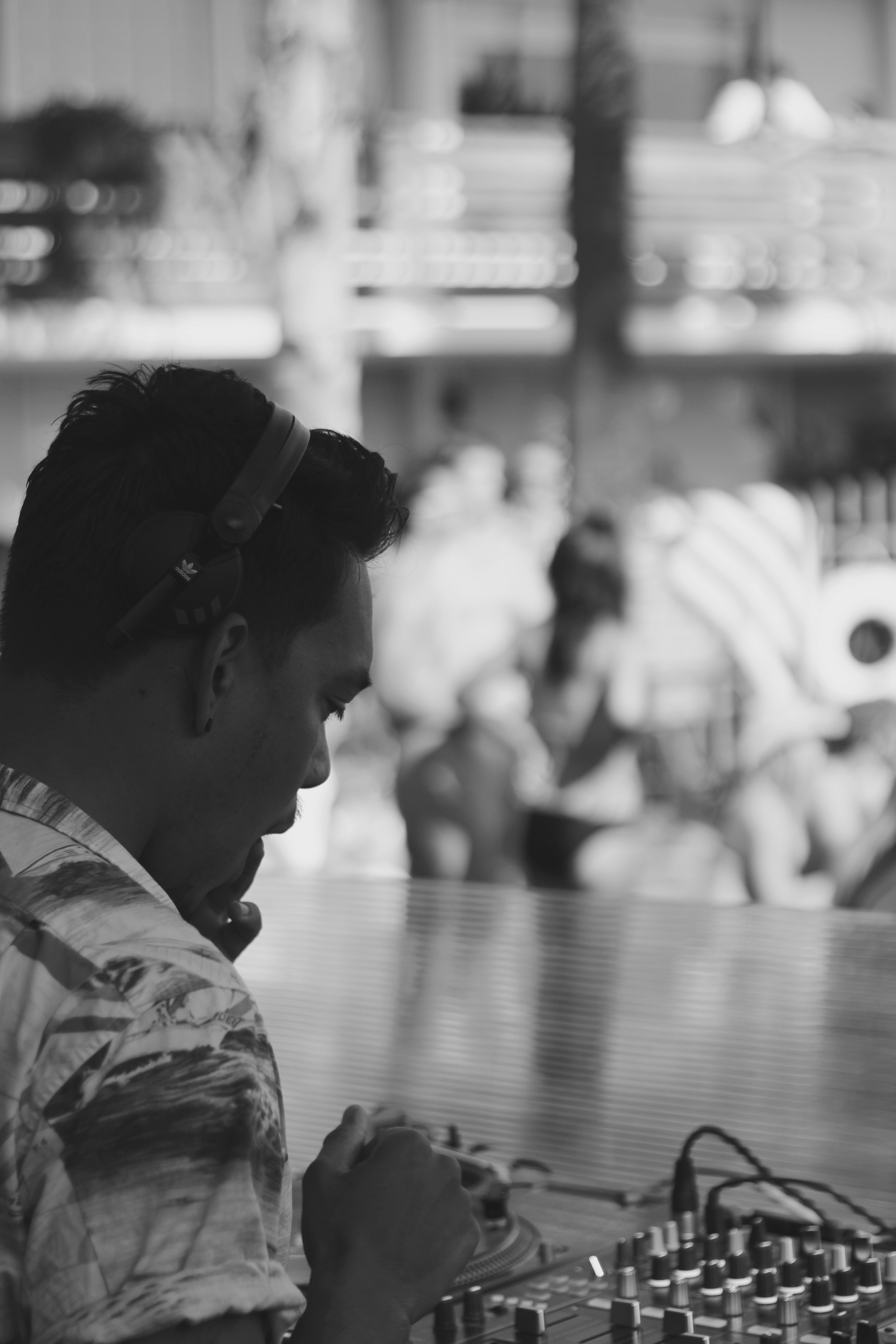
- Double-O

Background information
- Born: Michael Aguilar; Brooklyn, New York, United States
- Origin: New Jersey United States
- Genre: Hip hop
- Occupation: Producer
- Years active: 2000 – present
- Labels: Rawkus Records(2006-2007); Duck Down Records(2007-present)
- Website: https://www.kidzinthehall.com/

Michael Aguilar, better known by his stage name Double-O (or Double O), is an American producer, DJ and one half of the acclaimed hip-hop group Kidz in the Hall.

== Life and career ==
=== Early life ===
Born in Brooklyn, New York, United States, Double-O was introduced to music early by his father who was also a DJ and a guitarist/singer in a band during his youth in Belize. Even though Michael Aguilar Sr. ended his music career in its infancy, his love for music was apparent and passed down to his sons. "Even when we didn’t have much money I can always remember there being a loud system in the house" says Double-O of his early years. "He was always concerned with having a proper sounding system in the house and later the car." He later attended the University of Pennsylvania where he competed in track. Double-O is an accomplished track runner, having won multiple Ivy League championships and competing in the 2004 Olympics for Belize. While attending college he met classmate Jabari Evans, a rapper now known as Naledge. The two began working together and formed the hip-hop group Kidz in the Hall.

=== Kidz in the Hall ===
Double-O first met his future groupmate Jabari Evans (Naledge) in 2000 during a talent show at the University of Pennsylvania. They began recording songs, making demos, and performing at local shows which eventually led to Double-O and Naledge forming Kidz in the Hall. Double-O made a connection with Just Blaze through a job he had at T-Mobile, and Blaze soon recognized their immense talent. Blaze then aligned himself with the duo and oversaw their debut School Was My Hustle. Kidz in the Hall signed a group deal with Rawkus Records, and released the album to critical acclaim in 2006.

In early 2007, Kidz in the Hall created a song entitled "Work To Do" in support of democratic presidential nominee Barack Obama, who has ties to Naledge's hometown of Chicago. They were among the first artists to support Obama in their music. The song features a sample from The Main Ingredient's version of the Isley Brothers original of the same name.

In November 2007, Kidz in the Hall were officially signed to Duck Down Records, an independent label started by founding members of the Boot Camp Clik. The duo's second album, The In Crowd, was released in May 2008, with the lead single "Drivin' Down the Block," which samples Masta Ace's song "Born to Roll" for the hook and contains an interpolation of Outkast's "Elevators (Me & You)" on the bridge. Many other tracks on the album use samples and interpolations of early 1990s hip hop, including their song "Snob Hop" featuring Camp Lo which uses the hook from Black Sheep's song "Flava of the Month" for the chorus. Their song "Blackout" was featured on the soundtrack of Madden '09. The group's most recent album Land of Make Believe was released on March 9, 2010 and features guests MC Lyte, Just Blaze, Chip tha Ripper, Donnis, Amanda Diva and co-production by Just Blaze and Picnic Tyme. The album was declared the most "commercially viable" album the group has made thus far and was well-received critically, receiving an XL rating in XXL Magazine.

== 2013 - present ==
Double-O has been on tour as Lupe Fiasco's DJ since 2013.

== Discography ==
Solo Production

Tabi Bonney

Bang Bang (featuring Wiz Khalifa)

Nikki Jean

Champagne Water EP (2014) People & Planes (2018) Co-Production Pink Lemonade (2018) Co-Production

Freeway

- Free at Last (Freeway album) - Free At Last (song)

(with Kidz in the Hall)

Studio albums

- School Was My Hustle (2006), Rawkus Records
- The In Crowd (2008), Duck Down Records
- Land of Make Believe (2010), Duck Down Records

Mixtapes

- Detention (2007), Major League Entertainment
- Geniuses Need Love Too (2008)
- "The Professional Leisure Tour" (2009) LRG

Singles

- "Wheelz Fall Off ('06 'Til...)" (2006), Rawkus Records
- "Drivin' Down the Block" (2008), Duck Down Records
- "Love Hangover" (2008)
- "Take Over The World ft Colin Munroe and Just Blaze" (2010)
- "Jukebox" (2010)

Music videos

- "Wheelz Fall Off ('06 Til...)" (2006)
- "Drivin' Down The Block" (2008)
- "Love Hangover (feat. Estelle)" (2008)
- "I Got It Made (Reebok Classic)" (2009)
- "Jukebox" (2010)
