= Banco (Sir Michael Rocks album) =

Studio album by Sir Michael Rocks
- Released: July 29, 2014
- Recorded: 2013–2014
- Genre: Hip hop
- Length: 49:49
- Label: 6 Cell Phones
- Producer: Sir Michael Rocks; Blended Babies; DJ Mustard; Larry Fisherman; Reno; Tye Hill

Sir Michael Rocks chronology
While You Wait... (2013)	Banco (2014)	Populair (2015)

Singles from Banco
- 1. "Memo" Released: December 17, 2013

Banco is the debut studio album by American rapper Sir Michael Rocks. The album was released on July 29, 2014, by 6 Cell Phones. The album features guest appearances from Twista, Casey Veggies, Iamsu!, Robb Banks, Pouya, Mac Miller, Trinidad James, Too Short, Buddy and Chuck Inglish.

== Release and promotion ==
On December 17, 2013, the album's first single "Memo" was released. On January 14, 2014, the music video was released for "Memo". On June 19, 2014, the music video was released for "Playstation 1.5". On July 15, 2014, the music video was released for "Fuck SeaWorld". On July 23, 2014, the music video was released for "Bussin'" featuring Casey Veggies and Iamsu!.

== Critical response ==
Professional ratings
Review scores
Source	Rating
Consequence of Sound	B−
Exclaim!	7/10
HipHopDX	3.5/5 stars
RedEye	2.5/4 stars
XXL	3/5 (L)

Banco was met with generally positive reviews from music critics. Jesse Fairfax of HipHopDX stated "The choice of shrouding his trademark oddity in stock cuts and sheer confidence is a curious one, but Banco remains entertaining for the most part." Erin Lowers of Exclaim! said, "While the definitive setting of Banco is Chi-Town's disruptive powers and anger, Mikey Rocks brings forth the warming soul that soothes it. Having already established a career within the boom-bap realm, Sir Michael Rock's reinvention as a solo artist rips apart the blueprints he once laid and sets a foundation that may lead straight to el Banco." Michael Blair of XXL stated, "There are undeniable moments of prosperity within Banco, and it’s impossible to not vibe with Sir Michael for owning his lyrical distinction as confident as he does his luxurious wardrobe. But upon completion of the album, Banco unquestionably leaves the listener yearning for a certain type of production that more appropriately suits his lyrical capacity." Adam Kivel of Consequence of Sound said, "Though elements of it seem somewhat unconnected, Banco should go a long way towards making the solo stuff just as much of a hot commodity."

== Track listing ==
No.	Title	Writer(s)	Producer(s)	Length
1.	"Intro"	Antoine Reed	Reno	3:41
2.	"Memo"	Reed	Reno	3:41
3.	"Some Ish" (featuring Twista)	Reed; Carl Mitchell	Blended Babies	5:23
4.	"The Docks Skit"	Reed		1:28
5.	"Bussin'" (featuring Casey Veggies and Iamsu!)	Reed; Casey Jones; Sudan Williams	Reno	4:24
6.	"Playstation 1.5"	Reed	Sir Michael Rocks	1:59
7.	"Drug Dealer"	Reed	Reno	3:02
8.	"Kill Switch" (featuring Robb Bank$ and Pouya)	Reed; Richard Burrell; Kevin Pouya	Reno	3:43
9.	"Dino Feeding Skit"	Reed		1:14
10.	"Lost Boys" (featuring Mac Miller and Trinidad James)	Reed; Malcolm McCormick; Nicholas Williams	Larry Fisherman	5:39
11.	"One Time" (featuring Buddy)	Reed; Simmie Sims	Tye Hill	4:13
12.	"Cold Sore Skit"	Reed		1:37
13.	"Fuck SeaWorld"	Reed	Sir Michael Rocks	2:45
14.	"Ain't Nothing Like" (featuring Too $hort and Chuck Inglish)	Reed; Todd Shaw; Evan Ingersoll; Dijon McFarlane	DJ Mustard	3:28
15.	"Francois"	Reed	Reno	3:27
Total length:				49:49

== Charts ==
Chart (2014)	Peak position
US Billboard 200	118
US Top R&B/Hip-Hop Albums (Billboard)	21
US Top Rap Albums (Billboard)	13
US Independent Albums (Billboard)	19
