= The In Crowd (Kidz in the Hall album) =

Studio album by Kidz in the Hall
- Released: May 13, 2008
- Genre: Alternative hip hop
- Label: Duck Down; Koch
- Producer: Double-O; Black Milk

Kidz in the Hall chronology
School Was My Hustle (2006)	The In Crowd (2008)	Land of Make Believe (2010)

Singles from The In Crowd
- 1. "Drivin' Down the Block (Low End Theory)"

Professional ratings
Review scores
Source	Rating
URB	4/5 stars
RapReviews	8/10 stars
Metacritic	(73/100)
SPIN	3.5/5 stars
DJBooth.net	3.5/5 stars
Okayplayer	(90/100)
HipHopDX	3.5/5 stars

The In Crowd is the second album by Kidz in the Hall, released on May 13, 2008, by Duck Down Records. The first single released was "Drivin' Down the Block".

The album received mostly favourable reviews from critics who cited it to be an improvement on their debut, with Double-0's production in particular receiving credit.

== Track listing ==
No.	Title	Producer(s)	Length
1.	"The Blackout"	Double-O, DJ G.I. Joe	2:35
2.	"Paper Trail" (featuring Phonte)	Double-O	3:54
3.	"Drivin' Down the Block (featuring Masta Ace)"	Double-O	4:02
4.	"Lucifer's Joyride" (featuring Travie McCoy)	Double-O	3:26
5.	"Snob Hop" (featuring Camp Lo)	Double-O	3:35
6.	"Mr. Alldatshit" (featuring Donnis & Chip tha Ripper)	Double-O	4:01
7.	"Love Hangover" (featuring Estelle)	Double-O	4:06
8.	"Let Your Hair Down" (featuring Skyzoo & Lil Eddie)	Double-O	4:36
9.	"Middle of the Map (Part 1)" (featuring Fooch)	Black Milk, Double-O	2:28
10.	"Middle of the Map (Part 2)" (featuring Black Milk & Guilty Simpson)	Double-O	2:38
11.	"The In Crowd" (featuring Tim William)	Double-O	4:03
12.	"The Pledge" (featuring Sean Price & Buckshot)	Double-O	4:32
13.	"Inner Me"	Double-O	5:06
14.	"Drivin' Down the Block (Low End Theory)" (Remix) (featuring Pusha T, Bun B & The Cool Kids) (Bonus Track)	Double-O	4:05
15.	"God Bless" (Bonus Track)	Double-O	3:31

Deluxe edition bonus tracks
No.	Title	Producer(s)	Length
16.	"Cool, Relax" (featuring Jay Electronica)	Just Blaze, DJ Green Lantern	4:38
17.	"Love Hangover" (House Remix) (featuring Estelle)	Fred Falke	3:45
18.	"Love Hangover" (Instrumental)	Double-O	4:07
19.	"Drivin' Down The Block (Low End Theory)" (Instrumental)	Double-O	3:25
