= Land of Make Believe (Kidz in the Hall album) =

Studio album by Kidz in the Hall
- Released: March 9, 2010
- Genre: Hip-hop
- Length: 57:02
- Label: Duck Down
- Producer: Double-O

Kidz in the Hall chronology
The In Crowd (2008)	Land of Make Believe (2010)	Occasion (2011)

Singles from Land of Make Believe
- 1. "Take Over the World"

Land of Make Believe is the third studio album by American alternative hip-hop group Kidz in the Hall. It was released on March 9, 2010 via Duck Down Music. Produced by Double-O and Just Blaze with co-producers D.A. Got That Dope and PicnycTyme, it features guest appearances from Russoul, Amanda Diva, Chip tha Ripper, Colin Munroe, Donnis, Just Blaze, Marsha Ambrosius, MC Lyte, The Kid Daytona and Tim William.

== Critical reception ==
Professional ratings
Aggregate scores
Source	Rating
Metacritic	67/100
Review scores
Source	Rating
AllMusic	3.5/5 stars
Billboard	3.5/5 stars
HipHopDX	2.5/5
Pitchfork	4/10
Prefix	4.5/10
RapReviews	8/10
Spin	5/10 marks
XXL	XL (4/5)

Land of Make Believe was met with generally favorable reviews from music critics. At Metacritic, which assigns a normalized rating out of 100 to reviews from mainstream publications, the album received an average score of 67 based on nine reviews.

== Track listing ==
No.	Title	Producer(s)	Length
1.	"Intro"	Double-O	2:33
2.	"Traffic"	Double-O	3:59
3.	"Flickin'"	Double-O	4:06
4.	"Out to Lunch" (featuring The Kid Daytona)	Double-O	3:39
5.	"Bougie Girls" (featuring Russoul)	Double-O	4:41
6.	"JukeBox" (featuring MC Lyte)	Double-O	3:53
7.	"L_O_V_E"	Double-O	2:57
8.	"Will II Win" (featuring Marsha Ambrosius)	Double-O	4:15
9.	"Take Over the World" (featuring Just Blaze and Colin Munroe)	Double-O; Just Blaze; D.A. Got That Dope (add.)	4:34
10.	"Fresh Academy" (featuring Chip tha Ripper and Donnis)	Double-O	3:42
11.	"Simple Life" (featuring Amanda Diva)	Double-O; Picnic Tyme (co.)	4:39
12.	"Runnin'" (featuring Tim William)	Double-O	3:25
13.	"Do It All Again (I Am)"	Double-O	3:23
14.	"I Am (Reprise)"	Double-O	2:29
15.	"Rise & Shine" (featuring Russoul)	Double-O	4:47
Total length:			57:02
