= School Was My Hustle =

Studio album by Kidz in the Hall
- Released: October 31, 2006
- Genre: Hip hop, alternative hip hop
- Label: Rawkus Records
- Producer: Double O

Kidz in the Hall chronology
School Was My Hustle (2006)	The In Crowd (2008)

Professional ratings
Review scores
Source	Rating
The Guardian	5/5 stars
HipHopDX	4/5
Pitchfork	6/10

School Was My Hustle is the first studio album from Chicago hip hop duo Kidz in the Hall. It was the first release from a reactivated Rawkus Records, after its catalog was purchased by Universal Music Group.

== Track listing ==
1. "Hustler's Intro" – 0:57
2. "Ritalin" – 1:57
3. "Wassup Jo'" – 3:52
4. "Wheelz Fall Off ('06 Til)" – 3:44
5. "Ms. Juanita" – 3:57
6. "Cruise Control" – 3:17
7. "Go Ill" – 4:36
8. "Dumbass Tales" – 3:46
9. "Don't Stop" – 3:40
10. "Move on Up" featuring Mike Payne – 4:24
11. "Hypocrite" – 4:39
12. "Day by Day" / "We Almost Lost" (hidden track) – 8:19

== Samples ==
- "Wassup Jo'" contains a sample from "Dream Journey" by Bob James
- "Go Ill" contains a sample from "The Spic" by Alan Tew
- "Dumbass Tales" contains a sample from "Rockin' You Eternally" by Leon Ware
- "Move on Up" contains a sample from "Am I Black Enough for You?" by Billy Paul
