= Convertibles (album) =

Studio album by Chuck Inglish
- Released: April 8, 2014
- Recorded: 2011–13
- Genre: Hip hop
- Length: 53:32
- Labels: Sounds Like Fun; Federal Prism
- Producers: Mike Einziger (also exec.); Chuck Inglish; The Alchemist; Chuck Bein

Chuck Inglish chronology
Easily (2013)	Convertibles (2014)

Singles from Chuck Inglish
- 1. "Swervin'" Released: August 13, 2013; 2. "Came Thru/Easily" Released: October 15, 2013; 3. "Legs" Released: March 11, 2014

Convertibles is the debut studio album by American producer/rapper Chuck Inglish. The album was released on April 8, 2014, through Inglish's own Sounds Like Fun Records via Dave Sitek's Federal Prism Records. Co-produced by Inglish and Incubus' Mike Einziger, the 13-track project features collaborations with Chance the Rapper, Action Bronson, BJ the Chicago Kid, Ab-Soul, and Mac Miller amongst others, along with fellow Cool Kids member Sir Michael Rocks and Canadian electro funk duo Chromeo.

Convertibles was preceded by three singles – "Swervin'" featuring Sir Michael Rocks and Polyester the Saint, "Came Thru/Easily" featuring Ab-Soul and Mac Miller, and "Legs" featuring Chromeo.

== Critical reception ==
Professional ratings
Aggregate scores
Source	Rating
Metacritic	68/100
Review scores
Source	Rating
The 405	7.5/10
AllMusic	4/5 stars
Consequence of Sound	B−
HipHopDX	3.5/5 stars
Pitchfork	6.0/10
This Is Fake DIY	2/5 stars
XXL	(L)

Upon its release, Convertibles was met with generally positive reviews. At Metacritic, which assigns a normalized rating out of 100 to reviews from critics, the album received an average score of 68, based on 10 reviews. David Jeffries of AllMusic gave the album four out of five stars, saying "If there's a complaint to be made, it's that Convertibles is lightweight when it comes to subject matter, and with the whole whirlwind of influences flying about, the album could be taken as a slick showoff session, but these party songs stick to the bones. Skillfully strung together by ringleader Inglish, these flights of fancy turn into a substantial party album with plenty of fun and flash, so think of a more indie Pharrell or a modern ride through the Pharcyde because Convertibles is that kind of awesome." Ronald Grant of HipHopDX gave the album three and a half exes out of five, saying "Even with many of the compelling and genre-altering moments found on songs like 'Prism', 'Mas o Menos', 'Glam' and 'Dream', and the refreshing old school flavor of songs like 'Money Clip' and 'Game Time', the general lack of cohesion dims Convertibles' overall quality. Pair that with the fact that Inglish has always been known for enjoyably passable but not necessarily elite lyricism, and you're faced with an album that's fun and even at times challenging, but not as memorable as it should be. But give Inglish kudos for not balking to trends and being ballsy enough to venture far past the predictable and the stale with Convertibles. Frankly, it's a listen that's pretty enjoyable and well rounded. It could just stand to be a more tightly knit as a body of work." Larry Day of The 405 gave the album a 7.5 out of ten, saying "It may be a bit malnourished in thematic ingenuity – it's not as honest as Old or Oxymoron, or as celebratory as Acid Rap – but the allure comes from ingenious, inventive production."

In a mixed review, Michael O'Donnell of XXL gave the album an "L", saying "The 'Cool Kids' had a very distinct sound and it would have been easy for Inglish to retread his past. While he clearly still draws from what got him here, it's good seeing him reaching for a new sound, not wanting to be boxed into a particular style. The album, while slightly unfocused, does have its moments, and Inglish in particular, has revealed himself to be an artist to keep an eye on going forward." Pitchfork reviewer Renato Pagnani gave the album a 6.0 out of ten, saying "Because of this inherent charm, Convertibles ends up a low-stakes affair without being a low-quality one. And when you think about it, that's a pretty fair description of Inglish as an artist." In a less enthusiastic review, Matthew Davies of This Is Fake DIY gave the album two stars out five, saying "All things considered Chuck Inglish hasn't offered enough that's new or high quality enough to truly make a mark."

== Track listing ==
- All tracks are produced by Chuck Inglish, except where noted.

No.	Title	Writer(s)	Producer(s)	Length
1.	"Elevators" (featuring Buddy and Polyester the Saint)	Evan Ingersoll; Simmie Sims; Christopher Cleveland		5:15
2.	"Swervin'" (featuring Sir Michael Rocks and Polyester the Saint)	Ingersoll; Antoine Reed; Cleveland		4:00
3.	"Legs" (featuring Chromeo)	Ingersoll; Michael Einziger; David Macklovitch; Patrick Gemayel	Chuck Inglish; Mike Einziger	4:00
4.	"Came Thru/Easily" (featuring Mac Miller and Ab-Soul)	Ingersoll; Malcolm McCormick; Herbert Stevens IV		4:33
5.	"Attitude" (featuring BJ the Chicago Kid)	Ingersoll; Bryan Sledge		3:46
6.	"Ingles (Mas o Menos)" (featuring Cap Angels)	Ingersoll		3:34
7.	"Money Clip" (featuring Vic Mensa, Retch, Hassani Kwess and Sulaiman)	Ingersoll; Victor Mensah; Brian Onfroy, Jr.		4:27
8.	"P.R.I.S.M." (featuring Jade <3)	Ingersoll; Jade Hurtado	Chuck Inglish; Chuck Bein	5:25
9.	"Gametime" (featuring Action Bronson)	Ingersoll; Arian Asllani; Daniel Maman	Chuck Inglish; The Alchemist	2:03
10.	"H.M.U."	Ingersoll		3:58
11.	"Shitty Lullaby" (featuring Sabi)	Ingersoll; Jenice Portlock		3:47
12.	"Dreamy"	Ingersoll		2:57
13.	"Glam" (featuring Chance the Rapper and Macie Stewart)	Ingersoll; Chancelor Bennett; Macie Stewart		5:47
Total length:				53:32

== Credits and personnel ==
Credits for Convertibles adapted from AllMusic.

- Ab-Soul – featured artist
- Action Bronson – featured artist
- The Alchemist – engineer
- Chuck Bein – engineer, guitar, producer
- Josh Berg – engineer
- BJ the Chicago Kid – featured artist
- Jeff Bowers – A&R
- Nick Breton – engineer, mixing
- Buddy – featured artist
- Capangels – featured artist, vocals
- Benny Cassette – engineer, featured artist, vocals
- Chance the Rapper – featured artist
- Chromeo – engineer, featured artist
- Mike Einziger – engineer, executive producer, guitar, keyboards, mixing, producer
- Glenn Gonda – engineer, mixing
- Bernie Grundman – mastering
- Todd "Toddfather" Heathcote – Pro-Tools
- Jade <3 / Jade Hurtado – featured artist
- Chuck Inglish – drums, primary artist, producer
- Izzo – scratching
- Hassani Kwess – featured artist
- Carter Lang – bass
- Vic Mensa – featured artist
- Mac Miller – featured artist
- Jack Minihan – A&R, management
- Troy Mitchell – assistant, engineer, mixing
- Robert Peterson – guitar
- Polyester the Saint – featured artist, keyboards, piano
- Retch – featured artist
- Sir Michael Rocks – featured artist
- Sabi – featured artist
- Nico Segal – trumpet
- Ann Marie Simpson – violin
- Macie Stewart – featured artist, vocals
- Sulaiman – featured artist
- Alex Tenta – creative director, design

== Chart positions ==
Chart (2014)	Peak position
US Top R&B/Hip-Hop Albums (Billboard)	24
