= When Fish Ride Bicycles =

Studio album by The Cool Kids
- Released: July 12, 2011
- Recorded: 2009–2011
- Studios: The Blender; Freak City (Los Angeles, CA); Opra Studios (Los Angeles, CA); South Beach Studios; The Vault (Chicago, IL); Crescent Moon Studios (Miami, FL)
- Genre: Hip-hop
- Length: 51:07
- Labels: Cake; Green Label Sound
- Producers: Chuck Inglish; The Neptunes; Old Young; Pharrell Williams

The Cool Kids chronology
When Fish Ride Bicycles (2011)	Special Edition Grandmaster Deluxe (2017)

When Fish Ride Bicycles is the debut studio album by American hip-hop duo The Cool Kids. It was released on July 12, 2011, through Cake Recordings and Green Label Sound Records. The production was handled by Chuck Inglish and The Neptunes. It features guest appearances from Asher Roth, Boldy James, Bun B, Chip Tha Ripper, Ghostface Killah, Maxine Ashley, Mayer Hawthorne, Tennille and Travis Barker.

The album peaked at number 76 on the Billboard 200, number 16 on both the Top R&B/Hip-Hop Albums and Independent Albums, and number 9 on the Top Rap Albums charts in the United States.

== Critical reception ==
Professional ratings
Aggregate scores
Source	Rating
AnyDecentMusic?	6.4/10
Metacritic	75/100
Review scores
Source	Rating
AllMusic	4/5 stars
Beats Per Minute	80/100%
Chicago Tribune	2.5/4 stars
Consequence of Sound	B−
Pitchfork	6.9/10
PopMatters	8/10
Rolling Stone	3.5/5 stars
Spin	8/10 marks
The A.V. Club	C+
The Phoenix	2.5/4 stars

When Fish Ride Bicycles was met with generally favorable reviews from music critics. At Metacritic, which assigns a normalized rating out of 100 to reviews from mainstream publications, the album received an average score of 75 based on twenty-one reviews. The aggregator AnyDecentMusic? has the critical consensus of the album at a 6.4 out of 10, based on nine reviews.

AllMusic's David Jeffries praised the album, stating: "the kinetic, mini-funk monster "Swimsuits" with Mayer Hawthorne puts it over the top, making the long wait forgivable and the album highly recommendable". Cole Zercoe of Beats Per Minute resumed: "overall, When Fish Ride Bicycles won't convert any naysayers, but for both fans and those new to the group, this is a tightly-crafted showcase for the unique sound and style of The Cool Kids". Harley Brown of Consequence wrote: "some could argue that the Cool Kids abandoned their original minimalism on When Fish Ride Bicycles. However, they've contemporized their old-school influences for a wider audience. By incorporating both well-known names and lesser-known artists, the Cool Kids are finally in a position to get major exposure". David Amidon of PopMatters claimed: "the surprises of When Fish Ride Bicycles are more subtle than a title like that may suggest, and the influence of Pharrell on the final production even moreso". Mosi Reeves of Spin wrote: "When Fish Ride Bicycles may pay homage to Chicago summers, but this duo rarely break a sweat, rhyming in dulcet tones about designer sneaks and tricked-out GMCs".

Simon Vozick-Levinson of Rolling Stone claimed: "if the Cool Kids aren't quite as buzzy as they once were, their skills are tighter than ever". Tom Breihan of Pitchfork stated: "the Cool Kids have now proven that they can make an album, but they haven't proven that they ever needed to make an album". Greg Kot of Chicago Tribune concluded: "it makes for a solid if unremarkable follow-up, the kind of release that buys a little more time for the Cool Kids to live up to their original promise". Dan Weiss of The Boston Phoenix wrote: "When Fish Ride Bicycles doesn't have the same old-school shine to it. Instead it feels caught between a few different directions, as personified by its guest list: Travis Barker, Asher Roth, Bun B, and the irreducible Ghostface Killah. But even with the help, none of the tracks stretch particularly far from the Cool Kids' limited palette".

In her mixed review for The A.V. Club, Genevieve Koski determined "Fish feels a little warmed-over".

== Track listing ==
No.	Title	Writer(s)	Producer(s)	Length
1.	"Rush Hour Traffic"	Evan Ingersoll; Antoine Reed	Chuck Inglish	3:06
2.	"GMC's"	Ingersoll; Reed	Chuck Inglish	3:39
3.	"Freak City"	Ingersoll; Reed	Chuck Inglish; Old Young	2:32
4.	"Sour Apples" (featuring Travis Barker)	Ingersoll; Reed	Chuck Inglish	2:33
5.	"Bundle Up"	Ingersoll; Reed	Chuck Inglish	3:24
6.	"Boomin'" (featuring Tennille)	Ingersoll; Reed	Chuck Inglish	3:53
7.	"Penny Hardaway" (featuring Ghostface)	Ingersoll; Reed; Dennis Coles	Chuck Inglish	4:18
8.	"Get Right"	Ingersoll; Reed; Pharrell Williams; Chad Hugo	The Neptunes	3:15
9.	"Gas Station" (featuring Bun B)	Ingersoll; Reed; Bernard Freeman	Chuck Inglish	4:32
10.	"Flying Kites"	Reed	Chuck Inglish	3:40
11.	"Swimsuits" (featuring Mayer Hawthorne)	Ingersoll; Reed; Andrew Cohen	Chuck Inglish	2:33
12.	"Roll Call" (featuring Asher Roth, Chip Tha Ripper and Boldy James)	Ingersoll; Reed; Asher Roth; Charles Worth; James Jones	Chuck Inglish	5:04
13.	"Talk of the Town"	Ingersoll; Reed	Chuck Inglish	4:58
14.	"Summer Jam" (featuring Maxine Ashley)	Ingersoll; Reed; Williams	Pharrell Williams	3:40
Total length:				51:07

Notes

- Several versions of the album omitting songs "Freak City", "Flying Kites", and "Talk of The Town".

== Personnel ==
- Antoine "Mikey Rocks" Reed – vocals, executive producer
- Evan "Chuck Inglish" Ingersoll – vocals, producer (tracks: 1-7, 9-13), executive producer, photography
- Travis Barker – drum solo (track 4)
- Tennille – featured artist (track 6)
- Dennis "Ghostface Killah" Coles – featured artist (track 7)
- Bernard "Bun B" Freeman – featured artist (track 9)
- Andrew "Mayer Hawthorne" Cohen – additional keyboards (track 11)
- Asher Roth – featured artist (track 12)
- Charles "Chip Tha Ripper" Worth – featured artist (track 12)
- "Boldy" James Jones III – featured artist (track 12)
- Maxine Ashley – featured artist (track 14)
- Jonathan "JP" Keller – additional guitars (tracks: 1, 6), additional keyboards (track 9), recording (tracks: 1, 2, 4-6, 9-13), mixing (track 5)
- Jabari "Big Wiz" Page – additional vocals (track 6)
- Eddie L – additional vocals (track 9)
- Chuck Bein – additional guitars (track 11), mixing (tracks: 3, 10, 13)
- Old Young – producer & recording (track 3)
- Pharrell Williams – producer (tracks: 8, 14)
- Chad Hugo – producer (track 8)
- Kevin Bivona – recording (track 7)
- Andrew Coleman – recording (track 8)
- Ryan West – mixing (tracks: 1, 2, 4, 6, 7, 9, 11, 12)
- Ken "Duro" Ifill – mixing (tracks: 8, 14)
- Mark B. Christensen – mastering (tracks: 1, 2, 4, 6-9, 11, 12, 14)
- Scott Radke – mastering (tracks: 3, 10, 13)
- Chris Albers – mastering assistant (tracks: 1, 2, 4, 6-9, 11, 12, 14)

== Charts ==
Chart performance for When Fish Ride Bicycles
Chart (2011)	Peak position
US Billboard 200	76
US Top R&B/Hip-Hop Albums (Billboard)	16
US Top Rap Albums (Billboard)	9
US Independent Albums (Billboard)	16
