= Tacklebox (mixtape) =

Mixtape by The Cool Kids
- Released: May 31, 2010
- Recorded: 2009–2010
- Genre: Midwest hip hop; alternative hip hop
- Length: 41.40
- Label: C.A.K.E. Recordings
- Producer: Chuck Inglish; Old Young; Ski Beatz; The Productionix

The Cool Kids chronology
Gone Fishing (2009)	Tacklebox (2010)	When Fish Ride Bicycles (2011)

Tacklebox is the 2010 hip hop mixtape by Midwest hip hop duo The Cool Kids, and their third official mixtape after 2009's Gone Fishing. It was released by C.A.K.E. Recordings.

== Track listing ==
1. Fishing Lessons
2. Flying Kytes
3. Freak City
4. So Neat (featuring Tennille)
5. Going Camping
6. Volume II
7. Birthdays
8. Great Outdoors
9. Strawberry Girl
10. Systems
11. Good Afternoon
12. Parking Lot
13. Summer Nights (featuring Tennille)
14. Los Angeles Leakers Outro
15. Gettin' Flicked (featuring Boldy James)

== Critical reception ==
Sound In The Signals Magazine gave the mixtape a positive review, stating:

"When I listen to this mixtape I do feel that it lacks some things The Bake Sale had, and I miss those things, but in many ways I see new ideas developing and coming to fruition that make this group an undeniable force in hip hop. Nobody wants to hear the same thing twice and if there are hundreds of copycat groups, the best way to combat that is staying creative and I definitely won’t take down a group for experimenting with ideas and trying to create a unique product."
