= Donnis =

American rapper

- Born: Ladonnis DeCurtis Crump; June 2, 1984 (age 42); Montclair, California, United States
- Origin: Atlanta, Georgia, United States
- Genres: Hip hop
- Occupation: Rapper
- Years active: 2004–present
- Label: Atlantic/Fool's Gold
- Website: http://www.donnismusic.com/

Ladonnis Decurtis Crump (born June 2, 1984), better known by the stage name Donnis, is an American rapper based in Atlanta, Georgia. He released his debut mixtape, Diary of an ATL Brave, in 2009, and signed to Atlantic Records in 2010.

== Early life ==
Donnis was born in Montclair, California before moving to Atlanta. His inspiration to begin rapping was sparked by listening to Kris Kross, Kilo Ali, and the Dungeon Family while he was younger. He started to create and craft his own rhymes at the young age of 9 years old. After high school he joined the Air Force and was stationed in Tokyo, Japan. While on base he began performing and recording music, earning spots opening for such acts as T.I., Chingy, 112, and Erykah Badu. After roughly 2 and a half years in the Air Force, he stopped so he could finally pursue rapping as a full on career. Donnis stated in an interview with Amanda Bassa that his time in Japan helped to influence his sound and help him craft it into something a little bit different. Being around an entire new culture gave his sound a bit of an edge; saying that, "The Japanese are always a few steps ahead, that's why I love looking to them for what's next."

In an interview with Honey Mag, Donnis explained that he stays humble and keeps an underdog mindstate. He stated that, "I always keep an underdog mentality. I try not to act like I’m winning so much because I have idols out there that I watch kill it every day. I just saw John Mayer and said ‘Wow I hope I can fill up the Garden one day.’ And I watch Kanye and Andre 3000… these people get so much respect and were at one point the underdogs. And at the end of the day I want that same respect as one of the greatest, so I follow that lead."

== Career ==
Donnis released his first mixtape, Diary of an ATL Brave, in 2009 with the backing of streetwear brand 10 Deep. The mixtape led to a one single deal with Fool's Gold Records to release his single “Gone”. The success with this mixtape also earned Donnis on the very sought-after spot on XXL Magazine's 2010 Freshmen list. With one mixtape Donnis was shot into a bit of a spotlight.

According to XXL Magazine, he chose to ink a deal with Atlantic Records in early 2010. Atlantic won in a bidding war between Def Jam, Jive, Asylum and Downtown Records. “You know [Atlantic] put in the work and I feel like they the best label in the game right now,” he said. “I mean they makin’ the most money and makin’ shit happen.” He also felt that the label offered good, friendly competition so he could push himself and grow as an artist.

In March 2010, he appeared on the cover of XXL magazine for the magazine's annual list of Top 10 Freshman, which included J. Cole, Pill, Big Sean, and Wiz Khalifa. On March 31, 2010 he performed at New York City’s Highline Ballroom with other members of the Freshman 10.

June, 2010 saw Donnis release two mixtapes. The first, "The Invitation," was hosted by Atlanta notables DJ Infamous and DJ Holiday and featured freestyles of Usher's hit OMG and N.E.R.D's Everyone Nose. The project also featured early versions of tracks from "Fashionably Late."

"Fashionably Late" was hosted by Clinton Sparks and DJ Ill Will and included guests John Legend, Estelle, GLC, Yelawolf, and Atlanta natives OJ da Juiceman and Pill. The mixtape features production by Needlz who also produced Donnis' first single, "Gone."

On September 28, Donnis made his major label debut with the Atlantic Records release of the "Fashionably Late EP." Donnis' New mixtape "Southern Lights" was released on April 11, 2011 announced via Twitter. He also stated that there is major growth between this project, "Fashionably Late", and "Diary of an ATL Brave". His goal for "Southern Lights" was for it to offer a more personable feel to it. Each song involved more personal stories and events that helped to form this mixtape. Even the house on the cover art was the same house he grew up in during his youth in Atlanta, GA. "Southern Lights" was also made to show that Donnis wasn't a fluke. He wanted to show that he can consistently put out records and prove that he does indeed have what it takes to have earned that 2010 Freshman spot. In 2011, Donnis collaborated with Japanese lifestyle brand Onitsuka Tiger for the EP Nippon Sounds that featured original music and remixes by Japanese producers DE DE MOUSE, Joe Iron, and Taku Takashi.

== Tours ==
2010

- Crowd Control Tour (with Kidz in the Hall, 88-Keys, Izza Kizza)
- Homecoming: The Return of an ATL Brave (Japan)
- Swelly Life Tour (with Chiddy Bang)
- Sidewalks Tour (with Matt & Kim)
- Doo Wop and Hooligans Tour (with Bruno Mars)

2011

- Sgt. Schlepper's Who Needs Hearts Club Band Tour (with Travie McCoy, Pete Wentz, XV, Bad Rabbits)

== Discography ==
=== Mixtapes ===
- 2009: Diary of an ATL Brave
- 2010: The Invitation
- 2010: Fashionably Late
- 2011: Southern Lights

=== EP ===
Year	Title
2010	Fashionably Late EP: Released: June 22, 2010; Label: Atlantic Records; Format: Digital
2012	Break Hundreds & Hearts EP: Released: August 28, 2012; Label: Fool's Gold; Format: Digital

=== Singles ===
- 2009: "Gone"
- 2010: "Tonight"
- 2012: "Hello Kitty"
- 2017: "Touch"
