= Kidz in the Hall =

American hip hop group

- Origin: Chicago / New Jersey, U.S.
- Genre: Hip hop
- Years active: 2000–present
- Labels: Rawkus Records (2006–2007); Duck Down Records (2007–present); Interscope (2018–present)
- Members: Naledge; Double-0
- Website: http://www.kidzinthehall.com/

Kidz in the Hall is an American hip hop duo from Chicago, Illinois.

== History ==
Group members Jabari Evans (Naledge) and Michael Aguilar (Double-0) met in 2000 during a talent show at the University of Pennsylvania. They began recording songs, making demos, and performing at local shows which eventually led to Double-0 and Naledge forming Kidz in the Hall. Double-0 made a connection with Just Blaze through a job he had at T-Mobile. Blaze then aligned himself with the duo and oversaw their debut School Was My Hustle. Kidz in the Hall signed a group deal with Rawkus Records, and released the album in 2006.

In early 2007, Kidz in the Hall created a song entitled "Work to Do It" in support of democratic presidential nominee Barack Obama, who has ties to Naledge's hometown of Chicago. They were among the first artists to support Obama in their music. The song features a sample from The Main Ingredient's version of The Isley Brothers original of the same name.

In November 2007, Kidz in the Hall were officially signed to Duck Down Records, an independent label started by founding members of the Boot Camp Clik. The duo's second album, The In Crowd, was released in May 2008, with the lead single "Drivin' Down the Block," which samples Masta Ace's song "Born to Roll" for the hook and contains an interpolation of Outkast's "Elevators (Me & You)" on the bridge. This song was featured on the game Midnight Club Los Angeles: Complete Edition from Rockstar Games. Many other tracks on the album use samples and interpolations of early 1990s hip hop, including their song "Snob Hop" featuring Camp Lo which uses the hook from Black Sheep's song "Flava of the Month" for the chorus. Their song "Blackout" was featured on the soundtrack of Madden '09. The group's most recent album Land of Make Believe was released on March 9, 2010 and features guests MC Lyte, Just Blaze, Chip tha Ripper, Donnis, Amanda Diva and co-production by Just Blaze and Picnic Tyme. The album was declared the most "commercially viable" album the group has made thus far and was well-received critically, receiving an XL rating in XXL Magazine.

== Discography ==
=== Studio albums ===
- School Was My Hustle (2006), Rawkus Records
- The In Crowd (2008), Duck Down Records
- Land of Make Believe (2010), Duck Down Records
- Occasion (2011), Duck Down Records
- Free Nights & Weekends (2017)
- Adulting Anonymous (2023)

=== Mixtapes ===
- Detention (2007), Major League Entertainment
- Geniuses Need Love Too (2008)
- The Professional Leisure Tour (2009), LRG
- Semester Abroad (2011)

=== Extended plays ===
- Wishful Drinking (2013)

=== Singles ===
- "Wheelz Fall Off ('06 'Til...)" (2006), Rawkus Records
- "Drivin' Down the Block" (2008), Duck Down Records
- "Love Hangover" (2008)
- "Take Over the World" (featuring Colin Munroe and Just Blaze) (2010)
- "Jukebox" (2010)
- "Pour It Up" (2011)

=== Music videos ===
- "Wheelz Fall Off ('06 Til...)" (2006)
- "Drivin' Down the Block" (2008)
- "Love Hangover (featuring Estelle)" (2008)
- "I Got It Made (Reebok Classic)" (2009)
- "Jukebox" (2010)
- "Break It Down" (2011)
- "Occasion" (2011)
- "Pour It Up" (2012)
