= The Bake Sale =

EP by The Cool Kids
- Released: May 20, 2008
- Recorded: 2007–2008
- Genre: Alternative hip-hop
- Length: 32:16
- Labels: XL; Chocolate Industries; C.A.K.E.
- Producers: Evan "Chuck Inglish" Ingersoll; N. Cobey (exec.)

The Cool Kids chronology
That's Stupid! (2007)	The Bake Sale (2008)	Gone Fishing (2009)

Professional ratings
Review scores
Source	Rating
Allmusic	4/5 stars
The A.V. Club	(B+)
Blender	4/5 stars
Drowned in Sound	(8/10)
Dusted Magazine	(favorable)
The Guardian	3/5 stars
NME	(8/10)
Okayplayer	(89/100)
Pitchfork Media	(7.8/10)
PopMatters	(7/10)

The Bake Sale is the debut extended play (EP) by the American hip-hop duo The Cool Kids. It was released on May 20, 2008 by XL Recordings, Chocolate Industries and C.A.K.E. Recordings.

== Track listing ==
No.	Title	Length
1.	"What Up Man"	3:00
2.	"One Two"	3:32
3.	"Mikey Rocks"	3:27
4.	"88"	3:46
5.	"What It Is"	2:28
6.	"Black Mags"	3:11
7.	"A Little Bit Cooler"	2:51
8.	"Gold and a Pager"	3:47
9.	"Bassment Party"	3:27
10.	"Jingling"	2:47

CD bonus tracks
No.	Title	Length
11.	"Don't Trip"	3:18
12.	"Get Busy Sonnn"	3:02
13.	"Chicago Zoo"	3:12

== Charts ==
Chart (2008)	Peak position
U.S. Billboard 200	152
U.S. Top Heatseekers	8
U.S. Top Independent Albums	15
U.S. Top R&B/Hip-Hop Albums	64
UK Albums Chart	101
