= Gone Fishing (album) =

2009 mixtape by the Cool Kids

Mixtape by The Cool Kids
- Released: May 5, 2009
- Recorded: 2007–2009
- Genres: Midwest hip hop; alternative hip hop
- Length: 75:17
- Label: C.A.K.E. Recordings
- Producers: Jonathan "J.P." Keller (exec.); Chuck Inglish (also exec.)

The Cool Kids chronology
The Bake Sale (2008)	Gone Fishing (2009)	Tacklebox (2010)

Gone Fishing is the 2009 hip hop mixtape by Midwest rap duo The Cool Kids, and their second official mixtape after 2007's That's Stupid!. The project was executive produced by Jonathan "J.P." Keller and Chuck Inglish, and it was mixed by Don Cannon. The mixtape was released on May 5, 2009, as an appetizer for their forthcoming album When Fish Ride Bicycles.

== Reception ==
Professional ratings
Review scores
Source	Rating
Chicago Reader	(favorable)
Cokemachineglow	(73%)
Pitchfork Media	(5.7/10)

The mixtape was noted for its "electro banging beats and funny lyrics". The Chicago Reader noted that "the songs are ambitious and fully formed, showing a lot of range without sacrificing accessibility". According to FFWD's Garth Paulson, "The tape features the usual lackadaisical attitude, geeky references and early hip-hop idolization that rapidly sparks arguments over whether the Chicago duo is a breath of fresh air or willingly stale." Village Voice's Zach Baron said of the mixtape: "Inglish's beats are exactly as bass-thick, synth-wide, sample-heavy, and ambling as the duo's throwback raps, which here are in fine form." Pitchfork Media compared Gone Fishing unfavorably with The Bake Sale, suggesting it may be "a collection of castoffs that weren't good enough to make When Fish Ride Bicycles", but conceded that "Even when they're on autopilot, their icy flatness has style."

== Track listing ==
1. Introduction to Ice Fishing
2. Hammer Brothers
3. Champions
4. Gold Links
5. Cinnamon
6. Premium Blends (featuring Shorty K)
7. Step Back
8. Jump Rope (featuring Tennille)
9. The Last Stretch (featuring Jahda)
10. The Art of Noise (interlude)
11. The Light Company
12. Popcorn
13. Wise Words by GLC (told by GLC)
14. Pennies (The Updated Rosters Remix) (featuring Ludacris and Bun B)
15. Broadcast Live
16. Taking A Break Interlude
17. Tune Up
18. Weekend Girls Interlude (featuring Ryan Leslie and The S.O.S. Band)
19. Summer Vacation
20. Words of Wisdom by GLC (told by GLC)
21. Knocked Down
