= Chip tha Ripper =

American rapper from Ohio

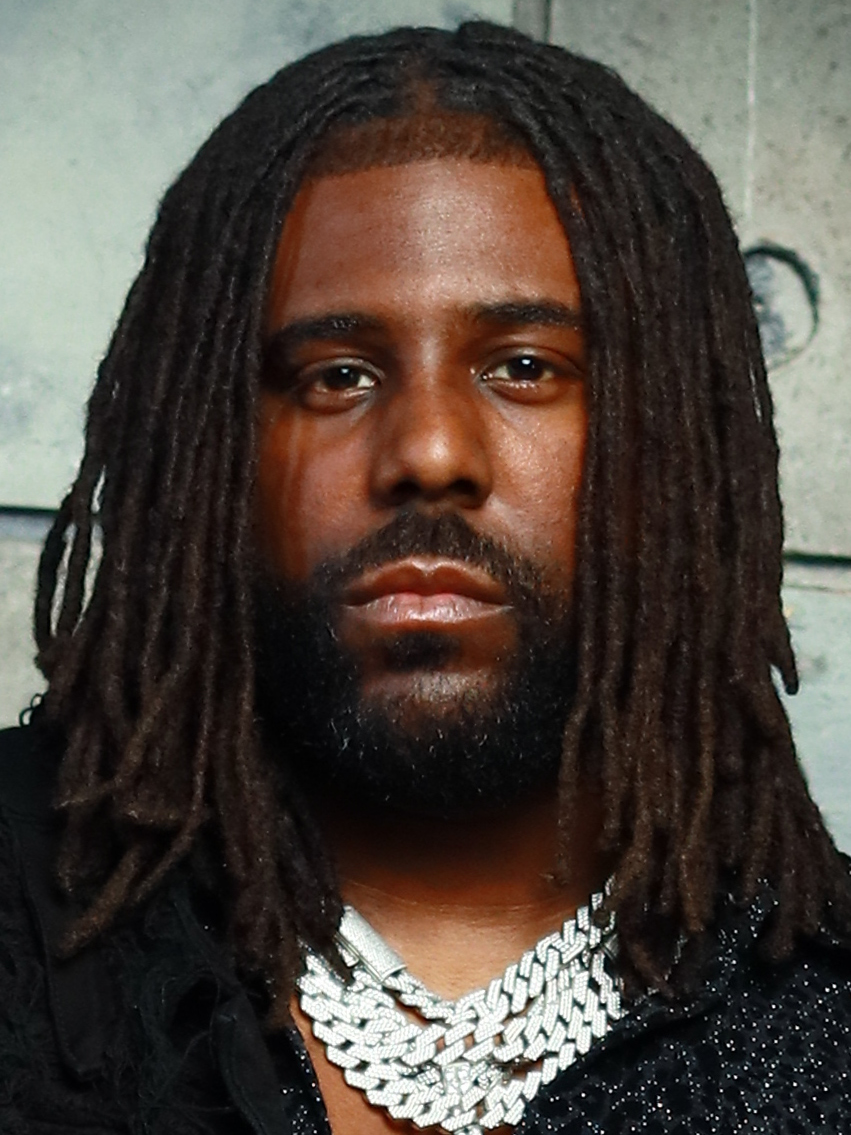
- Worth in 2023

Background information
- Also known as: King Chip
- Born: Charles Jawanzaa Worth; October 20, 1986 (age 39); Cleveland, Ohio, U.S.
- Genre: Hip-hop
- Occupations: Rapper; songwriter
- Instrument: Vocals
- Years active: 2006–present
- Labels: S.L.A.B.; Rebel Castles
- Formerly of: P.O.C.
- Website: www.kingchip.com

Charles Jawanzaa Worth (born October 20, 1986), known by his stage name Chip tha Ripper (also known as King Chip), is an American rapper from Cleveland, Ohio. He is best known for his guest appearance on fellow Cleveland rapper Kid Cudi's 2013 single "Just What I Am" (from the album Indicud), which received double platinum certification by the Recording Industry Association of America (RIAA). Along with his association with Cudi, Worth has amassed numerous mixtapes tailored for the Cleveland area.

== Musical career ==
=== 2006–2008 ===
Worth began releasing music on hip-hop blogs and mixtapes in 2006. Worth's musical style has been described as a slow, chopped and screwed, southern hip hop. "Catch The Beat," a song featured on his Money mixtape, gained popularity in his native Cleveland, and earned him further credibility in the hip-hop community.

In 2007, the song "Club Rockin," from his Money mixtape, featured Akon singing chorus. Worth remained an independent musician, and did not sign with a production company. In 2008, Worth frequently visited Chicago, where he eventually performed with Kidz in the Hall on their album The In Crowd, on which Worth performed the song "Mr. Alldatshit". Worth was featured on producer Hi-Tek's album Hi-Teknology 3 in 2007, and on Kid Cudi's first mixtape A Kid Named Cudi in 2008. Much of Worth's work near the end of this period leading into national prominence had been performed with rapper Kid Cudi, also from Cleveland.

==== Interior Crocodile Alligator ====
In 2007, Worth appeared on PrettyBoy Floyd's show, "Street Stars' Radio," and performed a freestyle song to the beat of Ali & Gipp's "Go 'Head.” It became known as the "S.L.A.B. Freestyle" (after his own label), but in recent years, it has come to be known more commonly as the "Interior Crocodile Alligator" song, after the final two lines:

"Interior crocodile alligator / I drive a Chevrolet movie theater."

The lyric refers to Chip's Chevrolet having reptile leather interior, being large, and having television screens installed in the vehicle. This snippet of the freestyle became very popular on the internet, especially for usage in memes.

=== 2009–2012 ===
In late 2009, Chip released a mixtape entitled The Cleveland Show, named after the animated sitcom The Cleveland Show. The single, "Fat Raps", features Big Sean and Currensy, and is produced by Chuck Inglish.

On September 5, 2010, Chip tha Ripper announced plans to form the musical duo the Almighty GloryUS with Kid Cudi, with whom he shared a mutual appreciation. They recorded a song in 2009 called "GloryUs", which started the duo’s beginnings.

In 2009, Worth was featured on Kid Cudi's first album Man on the Moon: The End of Day, which peaked at No. 3 on the Billboard Hot 100. Worth performed with Kidz in the Hall again in 2010, on their Land of Make Believe album. Also in 2010, Worth performed the song "The End" on Kid Cudi's second album Man on the Moon II: The Legend of Mr. Rager. On February 18, 2011, Worth, Freddie Gibbs, and the Cool Kids formed the hip hop supergroup P.O.C., an acronym for "pulled over by the cops".

=== 2012–2018 ===
On August 9, 2012, Worth changed his stage name from Chip tha Ripper to King Chip. He also said that he had signed a contract with Creative Artists Agency. Regarding his changed stage name, King Chip tweeted:

I am King Chip. Actually born in the ghetto slums of East Cleveland, Ohio. Rest in peace my mentor and former king, Hawk. His death made me....My birth name is Charles Jawanzaa Worth. Jawanzaa is Swahili and it means 'great leader and great warrior.' Look it up. I am King Chip.

King Chip performed on Kid Cudi's single "Just What I Am", taken from Cudi's third studio album Indicud (2013). On September 4, 2013, King Chip released the mixtape 44108. On December 26, 2013, King Chip released a music video for a song titled "Action Plan", from his 44108 mixtape. His next project was to be titled Rebel Castles. On September 16, 2014, a deluxe edition of 44108 was released to digital retailers through King Chip's Rebel Castles imprint.

=== 2019–present ===
In 2019, King Chip started referring to himself as Chip tha Ripper again on recent singles.

In early 2020, an old 2007 freestyle from Chip's visit to Street Starz TV Radio resurfaced and became a TikTok sensation gaining over 70 million views. In the same year Chip teamed up with New Zealand rapper Lil Mussie to take part in his charity EP helping kids in poverty. As of 2024, King Chip was featured on Cleveland native and fellow American rapper, frequent collaborator Kid Cudi's single for the Moon Man soundtrack, titled "Don’t Worry", which was released on September 18, 2024.

== Discography ==
- Money (2007)
- Double Trouble (with Al Fatz) (2007)
- Can't Stop Me (2008)
- The Cleveland Show (2009)
- Independence Day (2010)
- From Me to You EP (2010)
- Gift Raps (with Chuck Inglish) (2011)
- Tell Ya Friends (2012)
- 44108 (2013)
- 44108 (Deluxe) (2014)
- CleveLAfornia (2015)
- Thornhill (2017)
- Bonfire (with Lex Luger) (2022)
- The Charles Worth LP (2023)
- Rapping Paper (2025)

== Concert tours ==
Headlining

- The Charles Worth Tour (TBA; 2025)
- Cudder vs. Chip Tour (with Kid Cudi) (TBA)

Supporting

- The Cud Life Tour (with Kid Cudi) (2011)
