= The Cool Kids (duo) =

American hip hop duo

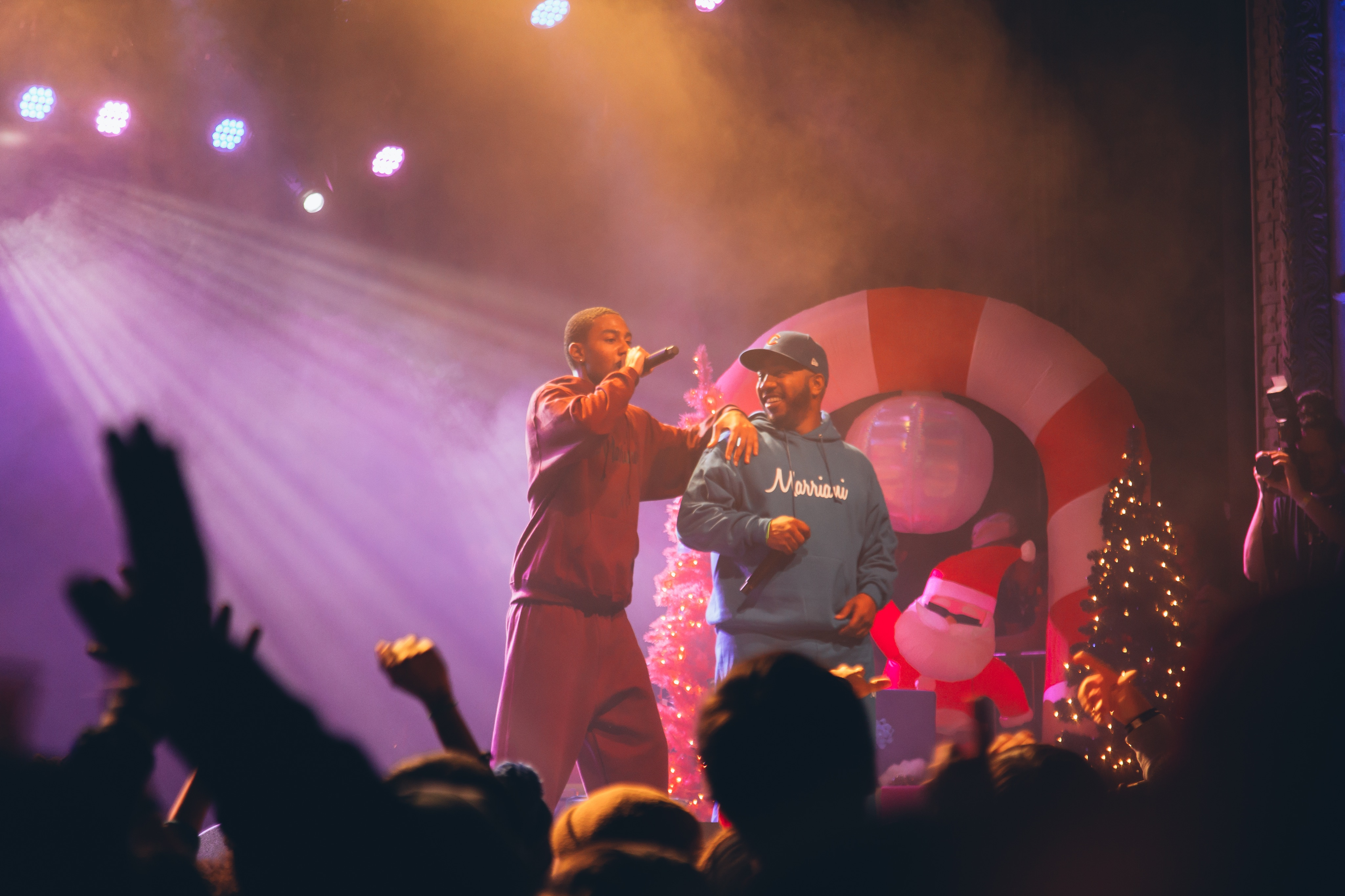
- The Cool Kids performing in Chicago

Background information
- Origin: Chicago, Illinois, U.S.
- Genres: Hip hop
- Years active: 2007–2012; 2016–present
- Labels: Green Label Sound; C.A.K.E.; Chocolate Industries; XL; Fool's Gold; Propelr Music; Sounds Like Fun; Empire
- Spinoff of: All City Chess Club; P.O.C.
- Members: Chuck Inglish; Sir Michael Rocks
- Website: coolxkids.com

The Cool Kids are an American hip hop duo composed of rappers Sir Michael Rocks and Chuck Inglish. The Cool Kids' music had been released primarily to the independent Chocolate Industries via their own label C.A.K.E. Recordings. Reed and Ingersoll have made appearances in numerous forms of media, as well as in collaborations with other artists such as Freddie Gibbs, The Alchemist, Mac Miller, Boldy James, The Neptunes, Curren$y, Dom Kennedy, Larry June, Pac Div, Travis Barker, Lil Wayne, King Chip, Asher Roth, Ab-Soul, and Chance The Rapper. The Cool Kids are also members of the hip hop collectives All City Chess Club and P.O.C. founded in 2010–2011.

== History ==
Reed attended Walter Payton College Prep in Chicago, Illinois while Ingersoll had attended Notre Dame High School in Harper Woods, Michigan where he played football and basketball. Reed and Ingersoll first exchanged conversations in 2005 when Reed found a beat on MySpace that Ingersoll had produced. The two met to discuss terms of the beat's sale, and eventually ended up recording for two hours. They were inspired by golden age hip hop and artists like LL Cool J and Eric B. & Rakim. Ingersoll began promoting the new duo's material, and it was eventually booked by Josh Young of Flosstradamus for a DJ performance. At this performance (in a venue called Town Hall Pub), the duo met the DJ Diplo who offered to release a mixtape of their unreleased tracks titled Totally Flossed Out on his label Mad Decent, though it was eventually released on C.A.K.E. Recordings. They also received an offer from the DJ A-Trak to sign to his Fool's Gold Records label, which they did, but only for one single. Of their time with Fool's Gold Records, the Cool Kids felt they were not getting enough attention: "When your boss is on tour with Kanye West, it’s easy to have timelines missed," said Chuck in an interview.

All of their material had been released solely on the band's MySpace page— their recording contract came after performances at the CMJ Music Festival and Pitchfork Media Music Festival, on July 15, 2007. Eventually, The Cool Kids signed to Chocolate Industries, another independent label. The group has revealed on its MySpace page that The Cool Kids' debut album, When Fish Ride Bicycles, will be released in 2008; however, it did not come out until 2011. Ingersoll has been the producer for tracks released thus far, but both work in rapping and production. The duo uses music software program Reason from Propellerhead Software to produce their music.

They have been on tour, opening for M.I.A. and they also joined the bill of the 2008 Rock the Bells hip hop festival on select dates. The group toured across Australia in February 2008; they also appeared at the Laneway Festival. The group also appeared at SUNY Purchase's Culture Shock event in April 2009 and performed with True 2 Life Music in November. One of the duo's singles, "Black Mags", was featured in a late 2007 Rhapsody TV commercial, along with Sara Bareilles. In the same year, the group collaborated with Lil Wayne and DJ Benzi through the Internet on a track entitled "Gettin' It", which will reportedly appear on the DJ's future album Get Right.

The Cool Kids have been featured in the video games NBA Live 08 and MLB 2K8 with the song "88", in Need for Speed Nitro, with The Bloody Beetroots in the song Awesome, and in the episode "The First Cut Is the Deepest" from HBO's TV series Entourage with the song "Mikey Rocks". They were listed in Rolling Stone's Ten Artists to Watch in 2008. According to Rolling Stone, "since "Black Mags" debuted, the Cool Kids have gone from an underground sensation in their native Chicago to the hottest ticket at New York's CMJ festival."

The duo has been endorsed by Mountain Dew for their single, "Delivery Man", to which commercials and the music video have aired on MTV2. The group's song "Bassment Party" was featured in the September 21, 2008, episode of the HBO hit comedy Entourage. They also recorded an original track, "2K Pennies," for the soundtrack of NBA 2K9. The Cool Kids have said in an interview that their success has been gradual. They will also be headlining the "NBA 2K Bounce Tour" along with Q-Tip. The Cool Kids also performed at the 2009 Voodoo Experience in New Orleans, Louisiana. Producer Don Cannon said in an interview with XXL, that he will be working with The Cool Kids for their new album. The group's second official mixtape, Gone Fishing was released on May 5, 2009. Their debut album, When Fish Ride Bicycles, was released July 12, 2011.

Their song "A Little Bit Cooler" was used in a "Most Valuable Puppets" commercial from Nike with LeBron James and Kobe Bryant entitled "Mrs. Lewis". A new mixtape called Tacklebox came out on May 31, 2010. Chuck Inglish worked with Chip tha Ripper and produced his debut album Gift Raps in its entirety. The group claims they haven't put out an album because of having issues with their former label Chocolate Industries for the past three years, but according to the group these issues are now settled and they are working on putting out When Fish Ride Bicycles. In 2010, Chuck Inglish and Mikey Rocks teamed up with Gary, Indiana's Freddie Gibbs and Cleveland's Chip tha Ripper to form the "super group" P.O.C. (Pulled Over by the Cops). Sir Michael Rocks has released a solo project titled The Rocks Report. When Fish Ride Bicycles was released on July 12, 2011. Featuring production by The Neptunes and also featuring Bun B, Chip Tha Ripper, Ghostface Killah, among other artists. The group plans a follow-up album titled "Shark Week".

On October 23, 2011, Mikey Rocks signed with Jet Life Recordings, a Warner Bros. imprint owned by fellow rap artist Curren$y. Chuck Inglish produced the EP "Candy Jams" for 10ille in February 2012 and is also set to work on a mixtape with Curren$y.

On April 25, 2015, member Mikey Rocks took to Twitter to address the consistent questions about a possible reunion, saying they were "never coming back." However, fellow member Chuck Inglish announced the duo were getting back together on July 13, 2016 The Cool Kids have since announced several concerts for the first half of 2017.

== Discography ==
=== Studio albums ===
List of studio albums, with selected chart positions and certifications
Title	Album details	Peak chart positions		
Title	Album details	US	US R&B	US Rap
When Fish Ride Bicycles	Released: July 12, 2011; Label: Green Label Sound Records, C.A.K.E. Recordings; Formats: CD, digital download	76	16	9
Special Edition Grandmaster Deluxe	Released: September 15, 2017; Label: Propelr Music, C.A.K.E. Recordings; Formats: CD, digital download	—	—	—
Volumes	Release: May 25, 2020; Label: Propelr Music, C.A.K.E. Recordings; Formats: digital download	—	—	—
Before Shit Got Weird (Chapter 1)	Release: March 3, 2022; Label: Sounds Like Fun Records; Formats: digital download	—	—	—
Baby Oil Staircase (Chapter 2) / Chillout (Chapter 3)	Release: March 21, 2022; Label: C.A.K.E. Recordings, Empire Distribution; Formats: digital download	—	—	—
Hi Top Fade	Release: October 10, 2025; Label: Fool's Gold Records; Formats : digital download, vinyl, CD	—	—	—

=== Extended plays ===
List of extended plays, with selected chart positions and certifications
Title	Album details	Peak chart positions		
Title	Album details	US	US R&B	US Rap
The Bake Sale	Released: June 10, 2008; Label: XL, Chocolate Industries, C.A.K.E.; Formats: CD, digital download	—	—	—

=== Mixtapes ===
List of mixtapes, with year released
Title	Album details
Totally Flossed Out	Released: 2007; Label: Self-released; Formats: digital download
Cool Ass Ninjas	Released: April 24, 2008; Label: Self-released; Formats: digital download
That's Stupid	Released: July 1, 2008; Label: Self-released; Formats: digital download
Gone Fishing	Released: May 5, 2009; Label: Self-released; Formats: digital download
Merry Christmas	Released: December 25, 2009; Label: Self-released; Formats: digital download
Tacklebox	Released: May 31, 2010; Label: Self-released; Formats: digital download

=== Singles ===
- "Black Mags" (2007), C.A.K.E., Chocolate Ind.
- "Delivery Man" (2008), Green Label Sound
- "Pennies" (2008)
- "Bundle Up" (2011), Green Label Sound
- "Swimsuits" (featuring Mayer Hawthorne) (2011), Green Label Sound
- "G.E.D. (Gettin' Every Dolla)" (Sir Michael Rocks featuring Tris J) (2012)
- "Im Doggin" (2012)
- "Mikey Rocks" (2014)
- "Running Man" (featuring Maxo Kream) (2016)
- "Connect 4" (2016)
- "TV Dinner" (2017)
- "Checkout" (2017)
- "9:15pm" (featuring Jeremih) (2017)
- "Dice Game" (2018)
- "Banana In The Tailpipe" (featuring Seafood Sam) (2025)
- "Foil Bass" (2025)

=== Videography ===
- Black Mags (2007)
- Delivery Man (2008)
- Pennies (2008)
- Knocked Down (2009)
- Tires (2009)
- Free Throws (2009)
- Do It Big (2010)
- Gold Links (2010)
- Big Talk (2010)
- Bundle Up (2011)
- Summer Jam (2011)
- Rush Hour Traffic (2012)
- Checkout (2017)
- TV Dinner (2017)
- Dipped (2019)
- Scam Likely (2022)

== See also ==
- Chicago hip hop
