= Chuck Inglish =

American rapper (born 1984)

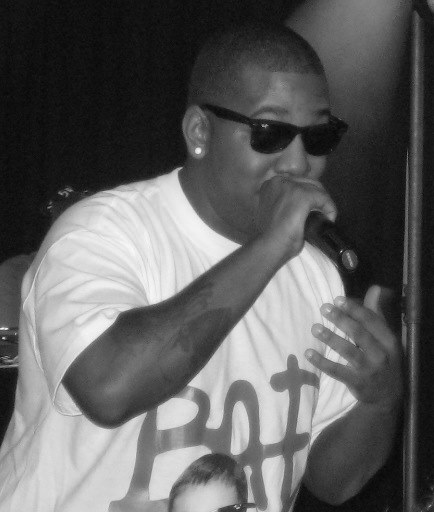
- Inglish in 2008

Background information
- Born: Evan Ingersoll; October 7, 1984 (age 41); Detroit, Michigan, U.S.
- Origin: Mount Clemens, Michigan, U.S.
- Genres: Hip hop
- Occupations: Rapper; producer; songwriter
- Years active: 2007–present
- Labels: Sounds Like Fun; Federal Prism
- Member of: The Cool Kids
- Formerly of: All City Chess Club

Evan Ingersoll (born October 7, 1984), better known by his stage name Chuck Inglish, is an American rapper, producer and songwriter most known for being part of the hip hop duo The Cool Kids with Sir Michael Rocks. His debut album Convertibles was released on April 8, 2014.

== Biography ==
=== 1984–2012: Early life and The Cool Kids ===
Chuck Inglish, born Evan Ingersoll, was raised in Mount Clemens, Michigan until he moved to Chicago, Illinois after turning 18. Ingersoll attended Notre Dame High School in Harper Woods, Michigan where he played football and basketball. He met Sir Michael Rocks in 2005 when Reed found a beat on MySpace that Ingersoll had produced. The two met to discuss terms of the beat's sale, and eventually ended up recording for two hours. They were inspired by golden age hip hop and artists like LL Cool J and Eric B. & Rakim. Ingersoll began promoting the new duo's material, and it was eventually booked by Josh Young of Flosstradamus for a DJ performance. At their performance (in a venue called Town Hall Pub), the duo met the DJ Diplo who offered to release a mixtape of their unreleased tracks titled Totally Flossed Out on his label Mad Decent, though it was eventually released on C.A.K.E. Recordings. They also received an offer from the DJ A-Trak to sign to his Fool's Gold Records label, which they did, but only for one single. During their time with Fool's Gold Records, the Cool Kids felt they weren't getting enough attention: “When your boss is on tour with Kanye West, it’s easy to have timelines missed,” said Chuck in an interview.

All of their material had been released solely on the group's MySpace page—their recording contract came after performances at the CMJ Music Festival and Pitchfork Media Music Festival, on July 15, 2007. Eventually, The Cool Kids signed to Chocolate Industries, another independent label. In 2008, the group revealed on their MySpace page that their debut album, When Fish Ride Bicycles, would be released in 2008, though it did not come out until 2011. Ingersoll has been the producer for tracks released thus far, but both work in rapping and production. The duo uses music software program Reason from Propellerhead Software to produce their music. In 2007, they opened for M.I.A. on her KALA Tour; they also performed at the 2008 Rock the Bells hip hop festival. The group toured across Australia in February 2008 and also appeared at the Laneway Festival. The group also appeared at SUNY Purchase's Culture Shock event in April 2009. One of the duo's singles, "Black Mags", was featured in a late 2007 Rhapsody TV commercial, along with Sara Bareilles. In the same year, the group collaborated with Lil Wayne and DJ Benzi through the Internet on a track entitled "Gettin' It.

The Cool Kids have been featured in the video games NBA Live 08 and MLB 2K8 with the song "88", in Need for Speed Nitro, with The Bloody Beetroots in the song Awesome, and in the episode "The First Cut Is the Deepest" from HBO's TV series Entourage with the song "Mikey Rocks". They were listed in Rolling Stone's Ten Artists to Watch in 2008. According to Rolling Stone, "since "Black Mags" debuted, the Cool Kids have gone from an underground sensation in their native Chicago to the hottest ticket at New York's CMJ festival." In 2008, they headlined the "NBA 2K Bounce Tour" along with Q-Tip. The group's second official mixtape, Gone Fishing was released on May 5, 2009. On May 12, 2010, they released a mixtape titled Tacklebox. In 2010, Chuck Inglish and Mikey Rocks teamed up with Gary, Indiana's Freddie Gibbs and Cleveland's Chip tha Ripper to form the "super group" P.O.C. (Pulled Over by the Cops). On July 11, 2011, The Cool Kids' debut album When Fish Ride Bicycles was released. On January 2, 2012, Inglish released an instrumental mixtape titled WRKING. On April 23, 2012, he released another instrumental mixtape titled WRKOUT.

=== 2013-present: Convertibles ===
On June 13, 2013, he released a mixtape titled Droptops. On October 15, 2013, he released a five-song EP titled Easily. On April 8, 2014, he released his debut album Convertibles through his Sounds Like Fun imprint and Dave Sitek's Federal Prism Records. Co-produced by Inglish and Incubus' Mike Einziger, the 13-track project features collaborations with Chance the Rapper, Action Bronson, BJ the Chicago Kid, Ab-Soul, and Mac Miller amongst others, along with fellow The Cool Kids member Sir Michael Rocks and Canadian electro funk duo Chromeo. Convertibles was preceded by three singles – "Swervin'" featuring Sir Michael Rocks and Polyester the Saint, "Came Thru/Easily" featuring Ab-Soul and Mac Miller, and "Legs" featuring Chromeo.

== Discography ==
- Convertibles (2014)
- Everybody's Big Brother (2015)
- Ev Zeppelin (2016)
