= Nipsey Hussle discography =

Hip hop recording artist discography

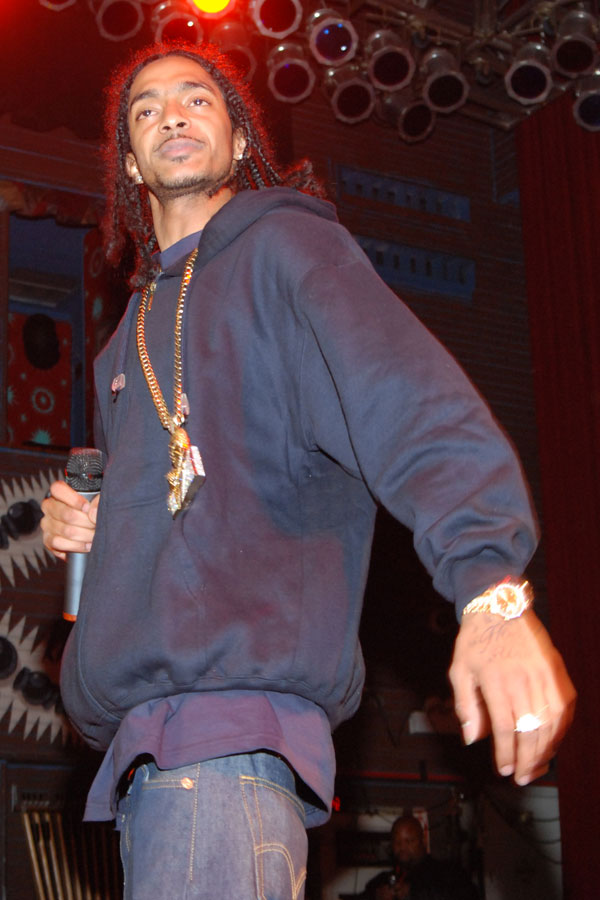
- Hussle performing in 2009
- Studio albums: 2
- Compilation albums: 3
- Singles: 54
- Collaborations: 1
- Mixtapes: 14

The discography of American rapper Nipsey Hussle consists of two studio albums (one released posthumously), 54 singles (including 22 as a featured artist), three compilation mixtapes and 14 mixtapes, including The Marathon, The Marathon Continues and Crenshaw. His debut studio album Victory Lap was released on February 16, 2018.

== Albums ==
=== Studio albums ===
List of studio albums, with selected chart positions, sales figures and certifications
| Title | Album details | Peak chart positions | | | | | | | Sales | Certifications |
| Title | Album details | US | US R&B/HH | US Rap | AUS | CAN | NZ | UK | Sales | Certifications |
|---|---|---|---|---|---|---|---|---|---|---|
| Victory Lap | Released: February 16, 2018; Label: All Money In, Atlantic; Format: CD, LP, CS, streaming, digital download | 2 | 1 | 1 | 71 | 14 | 20 | 56 | US: 2,000,000 | RIAA: 2× Platinum; BPI: Silver; RMNZ: Platinum |
| Prolific (with Bino Rideaux) | Released: August 14, 2026; Label: All Money In, Atlantic; Format: CD, LP, CS, streaming, digital download | 21 | 8 | 4 | — | — | — | — | | |
"—" denotes a recording that did not chart or was not released in that territory.

=== Compilation mixtapes ===
List of mixtapes, with selected details
| Title | Mixtape details |
|---|---|
| The Leaks, Vol. 1 | Released: September 1, 2013; Format: Digital download; Label: All Money In |
| Nip Hussle the Great Vol. 1 | Released: October 2, 2013; Format: Digital download; Label: All Money In |
| Nip Hussle the Great Vol. 2 | Released: October 2, 2013; Format: Digital download; Label: All Money In |

=== Mixtapes ===
List of mixtapes, with selected details
| Title | Mixtape details | Peak chart positions | | | |
| Title | Mixtape details | US | US R&B/ HH | US Heat | US Indie |
|---|---|---|---|---|---|
| Slauson Boy | Released: December 13, 2005; Format: CD, digital download; Label: Slauson Boy Records | — | — | — | — |
| Bullets Ain't Got No Name Vol. 1 | Released: August 25, 2008; Format: CD, digital download; Label: All Money In | — | — | — | — |
| Bullets Ain't Got No Name Vol. 2 | Released: December 4, 2008; Format: CD, digital download; Label: Cinematic Music Group, All Money In | — | — | — | — |
| Bullets Ain't Got No Name Vol. 3 | Released: August 4, 2009; Format: CD, digital download; Label: Cinematic Music Group, All Money In | — | — | — | — |
| The Marathon | Released: December 21, 2010; Format: CD, digital download; Label: Cinematic Music Group, All Money In | 179 | — | — | — |
| The Marathon Continues | Released: November 1, 2011; Format: CD, digital download; Label: All Money In | — | — | — | — |
| TMC: X-Tra Laps | Released: February 14, 2012; Format: Digital download; Label: All Money In | — | — | — | — |
| Raw (with Blanco) | Released: April 17, 2012; Format: Digital download; Label: Guerilla Entertainment | — | — | — | — |
| Crenshaw | Released: October 8, 2013; Format: CD, vinyl, digital download; Label: All Money In | 63 | 34 | 35 | — |
| Mailbox Money | Released: December 31, 2014; Format: Digital download, CD; Label: All Money In | 192 | 18 | 8 | 12 |
| Slauson Boy 2 | Released: August 15, 2016; Format: CD, digital download; Label: All Money In | 104 | — | — | 28 |
| Famous Lies And Unpopular Truths | Released: November 14, 2016; Format: Digital download; Label: All Money In | — | — | — | — |
| No Pressure (with Bino Rideaux) | Released: November 25, 2017; Format: Digital download; Label: All Money In | — | — | — | — |
"—" denotes a recording that did not chart or was not released in that territory.

== Singles ==
=== As lead artist ===
List of singles as the lead artist, with selected chart positions, showing year released, certifications, and album name
| Title | Year | Peak chart positions | | | | | | | Certifications | Album |
| Title | Year | US | US R&B/HH | US Rap | CAN | IRE | NZ Hot | UK | Certifications | Album |
|---|---|---|---|---|---|---|---|---|---|---|
| "Bullets Ain't Got No Names" | 2008 | — | — | — | — | — | — | — | | Bullets Ain't Got No Name Vol. 1 |
| "Hussle in the House" | 2008 | — | — | — | — | — | — | — | | Bullets Ain't Got No Name Vol. 2 |
| "Roll the Windows Up" (featuring Slauson Boyz and K Young) | 2009 | — | — | — | — | — | — | — | | Bullets Ain't Got No Name Vol. 2 |
| "The Life" (featuring Snoop Dogg) | 2009 | — (Note: "The Life" did not enter the Billboard Hot 100, but peaked at number four on the Bubbling Under Hot 100 chart.) | — | — | — | — | — | — | | Non-album single |
| "Gotta Take It" (featuring Lloyd and Taslema) | 2009 | — (Note: "Gotta Take It" did not enter the Billboard Hot 100, but peaked at number 25 on the Bubbling Under Hot 100 chart.) | — | — | — | — | — | — | | Bullets Ain't Got No Name Vol. 3 |
| "We Are the World 25 for Haiti" (as part of Artists for Haiti) | 2010 | 2 | — | — | 7 | 9 | — | 50 | | Non-album single |
| "They Roll" (featuring The Game) | 2010 | — (Note: "They Roll" did not enter the Billboard Hot 100, but peaked at number 12 on the Bubbling Under Hot 100 chart.) | — | — | — | — | — | — | | Bullets Ain't Got No Name Vol. 2 |
| "Feelin' Myself" (featuring Lloyd) | 2010 | — | 93 | — | — | — | — | — | | Non-album singles |
| "Proud of That" (featuring Rick Ross) | 2012 | — | — | — | — | — | — | — | | Non-album singles |
| "Rich Roll" (featuring Taslema) | 2013 | — | — | — | — | — | — | — | | Bullets Ain't Got No Name Vol. 2 |
| "Keys 2 the City" | 2013 | — | — | — | — | — | — | — | | The Marathon |
| "Run a Lap" | 2013 | — | — | — | — | — | — | — | | The Marathon Continues |
| "Thas Wat Hoes Do" (featuring YG and Rimpau) | 2013 | — | — | — | — | — | — | — | | The Marathon Continues |
| "I Need That" (featuring Dom Kennedy) | 2013 | — | — | — | — | — | — | — | | The Marathon Continues |
| "Rose Clique" | 2013 | — | — | — | — | — | — | — | | The Marathon Continues |
| "Checc Me Out" (featuring Dom Kennedy and Cobby Supreme) | 2013 | — | — | — | — | — | — | — | | Crenshaw |
| "U See Us" | 2013 | — | — | — | — | — | — | — | | Crenshaw |
| "The Weather" (featuring Rick Ross and Cuzzy Capone) | 2014 | — | — | — | — | — | — | — | | Crenshaw |
| "If U Were Mine" (featuring James Fauntleroy) | 2014 | — | — | — | — | — | — | — | | Crenshaw |
| "1 of 1" | 2014 | — | — | — | — | — | — | — | | Crenshaw |
| "Hotel Suite" | 2014 | — | — | — | — | — | — | — | | Non-album single |
| "Count Up That Loot" | 2014 | — | — | — | — | — | — | — | | Mailbox Money |
| "Between Us" (featuring K Camp) | 2014 | — | — | — | — | — | — | — | | Mailbox Money |
| "Be Here for a While" (featuring Vernardo) | 2014 | — | — | — | — | — | — | — | | Mailbox Money |
| "Question 1" (featuring Snoop Dogg) | 2016 | — | — | — | — | — | — | — | | Slauson Boy 2 |
| "Can't Spell Success" | 2016 | — | — | — | — | — | — | — | | Slauson Boy 2 |
| "State of Mind" (featuring Y2) | 2016 | — | — | — | — | — | — | — | | Slauson Boy 2 |
| "No Favors" | 2016 | — | — | — | — | — | — | — | | Slauson Boy 2 |
| "Foundations of a Man" (featuring DCokah) | 2016 | — | — | — | — | — | — | — | | Slauson Boy 2 |
| "Rap Niggas" | 2017 | — (Note: "Rap Niggas" did not enter the Billboard Hot 100, but peaked at number 10 on the Bubbling Under Hot 100 chart.) | — | — | — | — | — | — | RIAA: Platinum | Victory Lap |
| "Last Time That I Checc'd" (featuring YG) | 2018 | 76 | 29 | 24 | — | — | — | — | RIAA: 2× Platinum | Victory Lap |
| "Dedication" (featuring Kendrick Lamar) | 2018 | 93 | 33 | — | — | — | — | — | RIAA: Platinum | Victory Lap |
| "Perfect Timing" | 2018 | — | — | — | — | — | — | — | | Non-album singles |
| "Racks in the Middle" (featuring Roddy Ricch and Hit-Boy) | 2019 | 26 | 11 | 9 | 47 | 70 | 15 | 59 | RIAA: 4× Platinum; BPI: Silver | Non-album singles |
| "What It Feels Like" (with Jay-Z) | 2021 | 51 | 20 | 15 | 93 | — | 5 | — | | Judas and the Black Messiah: The Inspired Album |
| "Diamond Mind" (with Dr. Dre and Ty Dolla Sign) | 2022 | — | — | — | — | — | — | — | | Grand Theft Auto Online: The Contract |
| "Reckless" (with Bino Rideaux) | 2026 | — | — | — | — | — | — | — | | Prolific |
"—" denotes a recording that did not chart or was not released in that territory.

=== As featured artist ===
List of singles as a featured artist, with selected chart positions, showing year released, certifications, and album name
| Title | Year | Peak chart positions | | Certifications | Album |
| Title | Year | US | US R&B/HH | Certifications | Album |
|---|---|---|---|---|---|
| "Ice Cream Paint Job (West Coast Remix)" (Dorrough featuring Snoop Dogg, Nipsey Hussle, Soulja Boy, E-40 and Jim Jones) | 2009 | — | — | | Non-album singles |
| "My Shine (Remix)" (Ron Eazi featuring Nipsey Hussle) | 2010 | — | — | | Non-album singles |
| "When Ya On" (Chamillionaire featuring Nipsey Hussle) | 2011 | — | — | | Non-album singles |
| "Bitches Ain't Shit" (YG featuring Tyga, Snoop Dogg and Nipsey Hussle) | 2012 | 100 | — | | Just Re'd Up |
| "Black Faces" (Childish Gambino featuring Nipsey Hussle) | 2012 | — | — | | Royalty |
| "#Grindmode" (YG featuring 2 Chainz and Nipsey Hussle) | 2012 | — | — | | 4 Hunnid Degreez |
| "Californication" (David Banner featuring Snoop Dogg, Game, Nipsey Hussle, Kree and Ras Kass) | 2012 | — | — | | Sex, Drugs & Video Games |
| "Success" (Rookie Snow featuring Nipsey Hussle & E-Moe) | 2013 | — | — | | Non-album single |
| "You Broke" (YG featuring Nipsey Hussle) | 2013 | — | — | RIAA: Gold | Just Re'd Up 2 |
| "Cali Love" (Messy Monk featuring Nipsey Hussle and Kaizer Sose) | 2013 | — | — | | Non-album singles |
| "Coast to Coast" (Infamous Haze featuring Cassidy, Joell Ortiz, Dominic, Nipsey Hussle and Dro Pesci) | 2013 | — | — | | Non-album singles |
| "Aimless" (Cha$ten Tha Don featuring Nipsey Hussle and Kokane) | 2013 | — | — | | Non-album singles |
| "Blue Rag House Shows" (C-Hecc featuring Nipsey Hussle) | 2013 | — | — | | Non-album singles |
| "Hold Up" (Marion Band$ featuring Nipsey Hussle) | 2013 | — | — | | The Music of Grand Theft Auto V |
| "Ain't Nothin New" (Jadakiss featuring Ne-Yo and Nipsey Hussle) | 2015 | — | — | | Top 5 Dead or Alive |
| "California Water" (Big Lean featuring Nipsey Hussle) | 2015 | — | — | | Enough is Enough |
| "I Want a Benz" (YG featuring 50 Cent & Nipsey Hussle) | 2015 | — | — | | Non-album singles |
| "Do the Damn Thang" (Da YoungFellaz x Ralph Myerz featuring Snoop Dogg, George Clinton, Nipsey Hussle) | 2016 | — | — | | Non-album singles |
| "Dope" (King Lil G featuring Nipsey Hussle) | 2016 | — | — | | Lost in Smoke 2 |
| "FDT" (YG featuring Nipsey Hussle) | 2016 | — (Note: "FDT" did not enter the Billboard Hot 100, but peaked at number 10 on the Bubbling Under Hot 100 chart.) | 50 | RIAA: Gold | Still Brazy |
| "Higher" (DJ Khaled featuring Nipsey Hussle and John Legend) | 2019 | 21 | 9 | RIAA: Gold | Father of Asahd |
| "Deep Reverence" (Big Sean featuring Nipsey Hussle) | 2020 | 82 | 31 | | Detroit 2 |
| "Love Is the Message" (Rakim x Nipsey Hussle x Planet Asia x Louis King feat. Snoop Dogg, Sally Green & Kobe Honeycutt) | 2024 | | | | G.O.Ds NETWORK: REB7RTH |
"—" denotes a recording that did not chart or was not released in that territory.

== Other charted and/or certified songs ==
List of other charted songs, with selected chart positions, showing year released album name and certifications
| Title | Year | Peak chart positions | | Certifications | Album |
| Title | Year | US | US R&B/HH | Certifications | Album |
|---|---|---|---|---|---|
| "Double Up" (featuring Belly and Dom Kennedy) | 2018 | 65 | 26 | RIAA: 3× Platinum | Victory Lap |
| "Hussle & Motivate" | 2018 | — (Note: "Hussle & Motivate" did not enter the Billboard Hot 100, but peaked at number three on the Bubbling Under Hot 100 chart.) | 43 | RIAA: 2× Platinum | Victory Lap |
| "Victory Lap" (featuring Stacy Barthe) | 2018 | 100 | 39 | RIAA: Platinum | Victory Lap |
| "Grinding All My Life" | 2018 | — (Note: "Grinding All My Life" did not enter the Billboard Hot 100, but peaked at number four on the Bubbling Under Hot 100 chart.) | 44 | RIAA: 2× Platinum | Victory Lap |
| "Blue Laces 2" | 2018 | — (Note: "Blue Laces 2" did not enter the Billboard Hot 100, but peaked at number 13 on the Bubbling Under Hot 100 chart.) | — | RIAA: Platinum | Victory Lap |
| "Young Nigga" (featuring Puff Daddy) | 2018 | — | — | RIAA: Gold | Victory Lap |
| "Status Symbol 3" (featuring Buddy) | 2018 | — | — | RIAA: Gold | Victory Lap |
| "Right Hand 2 God" | 2018 | — | — | RIAA: Gold | Victory Lap |
| "Million While You Young" (featuring The-Dream) | 2018 | — | — | RIAA: Gold | Victory Lap |
| "Loaded Bases" (featuring CeeLo Green) | 2018 | — | — | RIAA: Gold | Victory Lap |
| "Real Big" (featuring Marsha Ambrosius) | 2018 | — | — | RIAA: Gold | Victory Lap |
| "500 Horses" (with Bino Rideaux) | 2026 | — (Note: "500 Horses" did not enter the Billboard Hot 100, but peaked at number 21 on the Bubbling Under Hot 100 chart.) | 29 | | Prolific |
"—" denotes a recording that did not chart or was not released in that territory.

== Guest appearances ==
| Title | Year | Other artist(s) | Album |
|---|---|---|---|
| "International" | 2006 | 2Pac, Young Dre The Truth | Pac's Life |
| "Killer" | 2009 | Drake | Nip Hussle the Great Vol.1 |
| "Money Time" | 2009 | Gizo Evoracci, Kayse, VR | Blow |
| "Retour aux Sources" | 2009 | Gizo Evoracci, Kayse, Snoop Dogg, Kurupt | Blow |
| "Replay" (Remix) | 2009 | Iyaz, Sean Kingston, Nipsey Hussle, Bizzy Bone, Rock City | Replay |
| "Upside Down" | 2009 | Snoop Dogg, Problem | Malice n Wonderland |
| "I'm on It" | 2010 | French Montana, Wiz Khalifa, Big Sean | Mac & Cheese 2 |
| "Hopes and Dreams" | 2011 | Wiz Khalifa | Rolling Papers |
| "What's Ya Life Like" | 2011 | Mod Sun | —N/a |
| "Grustle" | 2011 | PUSH! Montana, Wink Loc | When PUSH! Comes to Shove Vol. 2 |
| "Fountain of Youth" | 2012 | Rick Ross, Stalley | Self Made Vol. 2 |
| "Bills Are Paid" | 2012 | The Game | California Republic |
| "Grind Mode" | 2012 | YG, 2 Chainz | 4 Hunnid Degreez |
| "What You Need" | 2012 | Vado | —N/a |
| "Never Die" | 2012 | DJ Drama, Jadakiss, Cee Lo Green, Young Jeezy | Quality Street Music |
| "Pokerface" | 2012 | Yung Brodee | —N/a |
| "F*ck'n in the Function" | 2012 | Teeflii | AnnieOU'TAY |
| "Table" | 2012 | Teeflii | AnnieOU'TAY |
| "Neighborhood" | 2012 | Chevy Woods | —N/a |
| "Judas Closet" | 2012 | The Game | #Sunday Service |
| "Chun Li" | 2012 | Wale | Folarin |
| "Welcome to the Club" | 2013 | Crook671 | Sex, Drugs & Dubstep |
| "Welcome to the Club" (Remix) | 2013 | Crook671, Nump Trump | Sex, Drugs & Dubstep |
| "What U Got" | 2013 | Louis V, Dizzle | —N/a |
| "No Limit to This Real Shit" | 2013 | Master P, The Game | Al Capone |
| "Life Long" | 2013 | Rockie Fresh, Rick Ross | Electric Highway |
| "Loc'n" | 2013 | Cap1 | T.R.U. 2 It |
| "Duck Hunt" | 2013 | Blanco, The Jacka, YG, Messy Marv | Game Over |
| "Been from the Gang" | 2013 | DJ Mustard, Kay Ess, YG, RJ | Ketchup |
| "Never Know" | 2013 | Rapsody, Ab-Soul, Terrace Martin | She Got Game |
| "I Got a Friend" | 2013 | Kirko Bangz | Progression III |
| "Do the Damn Thang" | 2013 | Ralph Myerz, Snoop Dogg, George Clinton, Da YoungFellaz, Nicki Noelle | Supersonic Pulse |
| "Shame on You" | 2013 | YG, Payroll | Boss Yo Life Up Gang |
| "Same Hoes" | 2013 | The Game, Ty Dolla Sign | OKE: Operation Kill Everything |
| "Fuck a Bitch" | 2013 | The Game, Joe Moses, Elijah Blake | OKE: Operation Kill Everything |
| "Candy" | 2013 | PartyNextDoor | —N/a |
| "Go Long" | 2013 | Slim Thug, ZRo | Boss Life |
| "WhatYoLikeLife?" | 2013 | Skeme | Ingleworld |
| "About My Issue" | 2014 | T.I., Victoria Monet | Paperwork |
| "What It Be Like" | 2014 | Stalley | Ohio |
| "Hennesy & Weed" | 2015 | TeeFLii | Starr |
| "Doin' Me" | 2015 | Trae tha Truth, Lil Bibby | Tha Truth |
| "Hey Fool" | 2015 | Chinx, Zack | Welcome to JFK |
| "Ridin Around" | 2016 | DJ Mustard, RJ | Cold Summer |
| "Want These Bitches" | 2016 | DJ Mustard, Meek Mill, Ty Dolla $ign | Cold Summer |
| "A Million Bucks" | 2017 | DJ Kay Slay, Troy Ave, Rocko, Fatman Scoop, Vado | The Big Brother |
| "Living Good (R.I.P. Jen)" | 2017 | Problem, Iamsu! | Selfish |
| "Buy Back the Block" | 2017 | Rick Ross, E-40, Fat Joe, Slim Thug | —N/a |
| "Don't Give a Fucc 2" | 2018 | J Stone, Philthy Rich | Stone Cold |
| "Livin' in a Dream" | 2018 | The Neighbourhood | Hard to Imagine the Neighborhood Ever Changing |
| "That's Why" | 2019 | Eric Bellinger | The Rebirth 2 |
| "So Cold" | 2019 | Privaledge | —N/a |
| "Perfect Ten" | 2019 | Mustard | Perfect Ten |
| "Rich Nigga Lifestyle" | 2019 | Rick Ross, Teyana Taylor | Port of Miami 2 |
| "Nineteen" | 2019 | J Stone, Pacman Da Gunman, Casanova | The Definition of Loyalty |
| "Welcome Home" | 2019 | The Game | Born 2 Rap |
| "Lebron James" | 2020 | J Stone, Dom Kennedy | The Definition of Pain |
| "Started wit Nothin'" | 2020 | J Stone, T.I. | The Definition of Pain |
| "Memories (Remix)" | 2021 | Maroon 5, YG | Jordi |
| "World Tours" | 2022 | The Game | Drillmatic: Heart vs. Mind |
| "Raised Different" | 2023 | DJ Drama, Blxst, Jeezy | I'm Really Like That |
