= Victory lap (disambiguation) =

A victory lap is a term used in motorsports or any sport championship to describe an extra lap of the race track after the conclusion of a race or after a team have been crowned as the champion.

Victory lap may also refer to:

- "Victory Lap" (song), a song by Macklemore & Ryan Lewis from the album The Heist.
- Victory lap (academia)
- Victory Lap (Propagandhi album), 2017, or the title track
- Victory Lap (Nipsey Hussle album), 2018
  - "Victory Lap" (Nipsey Hussle song)
- "Victory Lap" (Fred Again, PlaqueBoyMax and Skepta song)
- "Victory Lap", a song by All That Remains from the 2015 album The Order of Things
- "Victory Lap", a song by OsamaSon from Psykotic, 2025
- Victory Laps, a 2011 EP by Doomstarks, or the title track
- "Victory Lap" (Billions), a 2017 television episode
