= Slauson Boy 2 =

Mixtape by Nipsey Hussle
- Released: August 15, 2016
- Genre: Hip-hop
- Length: 51:02
- Label: All Money In
- Producer: Blacc Sam (exec.); Fatts (exec.); Adam (exec.); Nipsey Hussle (exec.); Mike & Keys (also exec.); 1500 or Nothin'; DJ Khalil; Jake One; Tariq Beats

Nipsey Hussle chronology
Mailbox Money (2014)	Slauson Boy 2 (2016)	Victory Lap (2018)

Professional ratings
Review scores
Source	Rating
HipHopDX	3.7/5

Slauson Boy 2 is the tenth mixtape by American rapper Nipsey Hussle, and the final commercial mixtape to be released during his lifetime. It was released on his thirty-first birthday, on August 15, 2016, as a free digital download via mixtape hosting websites. Production was primarily handled by Marz, Mike & Keys, and Tariq Beats among others. It features guest appearances from Bino Rideaux, Mozzy, Buddy, Cuzzy Capone, Dave East, G Perico, Kirko Bangz, Mitchy Slick, Snoop Dogg, Stacy Barthe, Young Dolph, Young Life and Young Thug. The album served as a sequel to his debut mixtape Slauson Boy Vol. 1.

After Nipsey Hussle's death on March 31, 2019, the album reached Billboard charts, peaking at number 104 on the Billboard 200 and at number 28 on the Independent Albums.

== Track listing ==
No.	Title	Length
1.	"Ocean Views"	3:50
2.	"Ain't Hard Enough" (featuring Mozzy)	2:15
3.	"I Do This" (featuring Mozzy and Young Thug)	4:09
4.	"Shell Shocked"	2:04
5.	"Full Time" (featuring Mitchy Slick)	3:11
6.	"Clarity" (featuring Bino Rideaux and Dave East)	3:12
7.	"Thug Life" (featuring Young Thug)	3:57
8.	"One Hunnit"	2:40
9.	"Picture Me Rollin'"	2:13
10.	"Status Symbol 2" (featuring Buddy)	2:00
11.	"Basic Instinct" (featuring G Perico)	1:36
12.	"Question #1" (featuring Snoop Dogg)	2:30
13.	"The Field" (featuring Bino Rideaux and Young Dolph)	3:45
14.	"On the Floor" (featuring Cuzzy Capone)	3:18
15.	"I Don't Stress"	4:21
16.	"Mercy" (featuring Stacy Barthe)	2:33
17.	"Down as a Great" (featuring Kirko Bangz)	3:28

== Charts ==
Chart (2019)	Peak position
US Billboard 200	104
US Independent Albums (Billboard)	28
