= Mailbox Money (mixtape) =

Mixtape by Nipsey Hussle
- Released: December 31, 2014
- Recorded: 2009
- Studio: Lumpur Records
- Genre: Hip-hop
- Length: 59:54
- Label: All Money In
- Producers: Blacc Sam (exec.); Fatts (exec.); Adam (exec.); Nipsey Hussle (exec.); Steven "Steve-O" Carless (co-exec.); AxlFolie; DJ Khalil; DJ Mustard; Drewbyrd; Hit-Boy; Kicken J; Mike & Keys; Polyester; Ralo Stylez; Rance; Ricci Riera; SAP; Scoop DeVille; THC; Uncle Dave; Wizzo

Nipsey Hussle chronology
Crenshaw (2009)	Mailbox Money (2014)	Slauson Boy 2 (2011 The Marathon Continues)

Singles from Mailbox Money
- 1. "Count Up That Loot" Released: January 14, 2014; 2. "Between Us" Released: January 28, 2014; 3. "Where Yo Money At" Released: March 4, 2014; 4. "No Nigga Like Me" Released: December 4, 2014; 5. "A Hunnit A Show" Released: December 10, 2014

Mailbox Money is the debut LP by American rapper Nipsey Hussle. The mixtape was released as a free digital download on December 31, 2014, on mixtape hosting websites. It was also released in a limited first edition of 100 copies for $1,000 each including other incentives via his All Money In record label, which followed-up Crenshaw, that was sold under the same schema but rather 1,000 copies for $100. The mixtape features production by DJ Mustard, Rance, Hit-Boy, DJ Khalil, Ralo Stylez and Wizzo, among others. Guest appearances on the mixtape came from Rick Ross, Dom Kennedy, K Camp, Trae Tha Truth, Buddy and many others. The mixtape was supported by the singles "A Hunnit A Show" featuring Rick Ross, "Between Us" featuring K Camp, "Where Yo Money At", "Count Up That Loot", and "No Nigga Like Me".

== Background ==
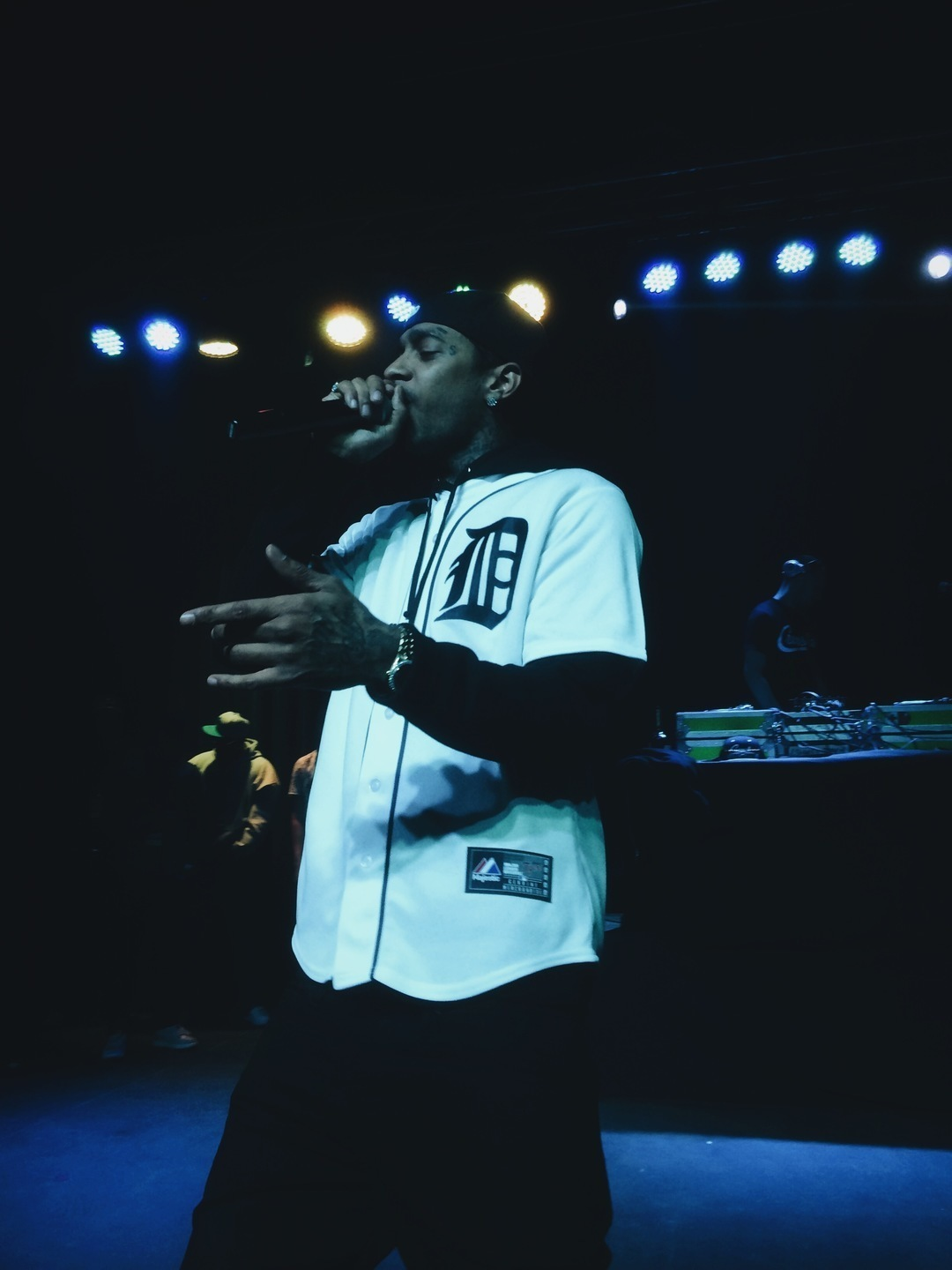
Nipsey Hussle during his Crenshaw Tour in Detroit

After releasing Crenshaw, October 2013, Nipsey quickly diverted the critical acclaim and success towards his Crenshaw Tour. Where he went on a 31-city trek, which started on January 9, 2014, and ended on February 13, 2014. While on his tour, Nipsey Hussle also released a plethora of songs which were considered freebies that were eventually added onto the 'Mailbox Money' project, such as "Count Up That Loot", "Between Us", "Be Here For A While", and "Where Yo Money At".

Upon the end of his tour, Nipsey created the idea to "Mailbox Money", after reading an article from the EzineArticles, to which describes the details of passive income and equity. From there, he emulated the same idea for his follow-up project, and announced that it would be released some time in December.

On December 29, 2014, he revealed the track list for Mailbox Money, which contained guest appearances from Rick Ross, Dom Kennedy, Trae Tha Truth, Buddy, J. Stone, K Camp, GI Joe, Pacman, Conrad, and Vernardo. Production was handled by, DJ Mustard, Rance, Hit-Boy, DJ Khalil, Ralo Stylez and Wizzo, among others.

== Release and promotion ==
On December 3, 2014, Hussle announced his 2015 European tour via iHussle.com to which after the release of the 'Mailbox Money' project, he would travel around 11 countries, such as France, England, Germany, and many other countries around Europe, from January 14, 2015 to February 1, 2015.

== Sales ==
According to Nipsey Hussle, he has sold 60 copies of the limited retail version of the album (which cost $1,000) as of 1/24/2015.

== Singles ==
On December 4, 2014, Nipsey released his official debut single, "50 Niggaz", for the forthcoming project, 'Mailbox Money', and explain the motive and direction of the track and project in its entirety by saying,

It's crazy because that record is a year and a half old. I was going to hold it but felt like it made sense with everything that's going on. We've seen this before, especially in L.A., where we felt like we didn't get any justice. I was a little kid during the Rodney King riots. I remember it. There were tanks on Crenshaw and Slauson. The grocery store my grandparents shopped at was burned down. It seemed familiar, and I have a voice now. I didn't want to take to Twitter and all that. I did feel a way about it and wanted to say something.

The following week, he also released the second single, entitled "A Hunnit A Show", alongside Rick Ross, which was produced by Hit-Boy.

== Track listing ==
No.	Title	Producer(s)	Length
1.	"Killa"	Wizzo; Ralo Stylez	4:41
2.	"A Hunnit a Show" (featuring Rick Ross)	Hit-Boy	2:40
3.	"Status Symbol" (featuring Buddy)	Drewbyrd	5:22
4.	"That's How I Knew"	Sap; Kicken J	4:52
5.	"Count Up That Loot"	Drewbyrd	3:35
6.	"Only a Case" (featuring G.I. Joe & Conrad)	Scoop DeVille	3:41
7.	"Where Yo Money At" (featuring Pacman)	DJ Mustard	3:28
8.	"Between Us" (featuring K Camp)	Ricci Riera; AxlFolie	4:16
9.	"Real Nigga Moves" (featuring Dom Kennedy)	Mike & Keys; Uncle Dave; Rance^{[a]}	2:57
10.	"Stay Loyal" (featuring J. Stone)	Riera; AxlFolie; Rance^{[a]}	5:18
11.	"A Miracle"	Mike & Keys; DJ Khalil	3:29
12.	"No Nigga Like Me" (featuring Trae Tha Truth)	Mike & Keys; Riera; AxlFolie	3:23
13.	"50 Niggaz"	Mike & Keys	2:55
14.	"Be Here For A While" (featuring Vernardo)	Polyester	4:38
15.	"Overtime"	Ralo Stylez; Rance^{[a]}	4:39

Track notes

- ^{^[a]} signifies an co-producer

== Charts ==
Chart (2019)	Peak position
US Billboard 200	192
US Top R&B/Hip-Hop Albums (Billboard)	18
US Top Rap Albums (Billboard)	13
US Independent Albums (Billboard)	12
US Heatseekers Albums (Billboard)	8
