= Crenshaw (mixtape) =

Mixtape by Nipsey Hussle
- Released: October 8, 2013
- Recorded: 2013
- Genre: Hip-hop
- Length: 85:25
- Label: All Money In
- Producers: 1500 or Nothin'; 9th Wonder; BandPlay; Big Blizz; Bruce S.; The Colleagues; Cozmo; DJ Dahi; The Futuristiks; G.Ry and B. Carr of The Surf Club; Jiggy Hendrix; M.A; Mike Free; Ralo Stylez; Remixx; Sarah J; Soundsmith Productions; Wizzo; TeeFlii

Nipsey Hussle chronology
The Marathon Continues (2011)	Crenshaw (2013)	Mailbox Money (2014)

Singles from Crenshaw
- 1. "Face The World" Released: May 23, 2013; 2. "Checc Me Out" Released: September 26, 2013; 3. "U See Us" Released: December 2, 2013; 4. "The Weather" Released: January 29, 2014; 5. "If U Were Mine" Released: January 29, 2014; 6. "1 of 1" Released: January 29, 2014

Crenshaw is the eighth mixtape by American rapper Nipsey Hussle. The mixtape was released as a free digital download on October 8, 2013, on mixtape hosting websites. It was also released in a limited first edition of 1,000 copies for $100 each including other incentives via his All Money In record label. The mixtape features production by The Futuristiks, 1500 or Nothin', 9th Wonder, DJ Dahi, Mike Free, Ralo, Wizzo and Jiggy Hendrix, among others. Guest appearances on the mixtape came from Rick Ross, Dom Kennedy, Slim Thug, James Fauntleroy II, Z-Ro, Skeme and Sade among others. The mixtape was supported by the singles "Checc Me Out" featuring Dom Kennedy and Cobby Supreme, "U See Us", "The Weather" featuring Rick Ross, "If U Were Mine" featuring Fauntleroy, and "1 of 1".

== Background ==
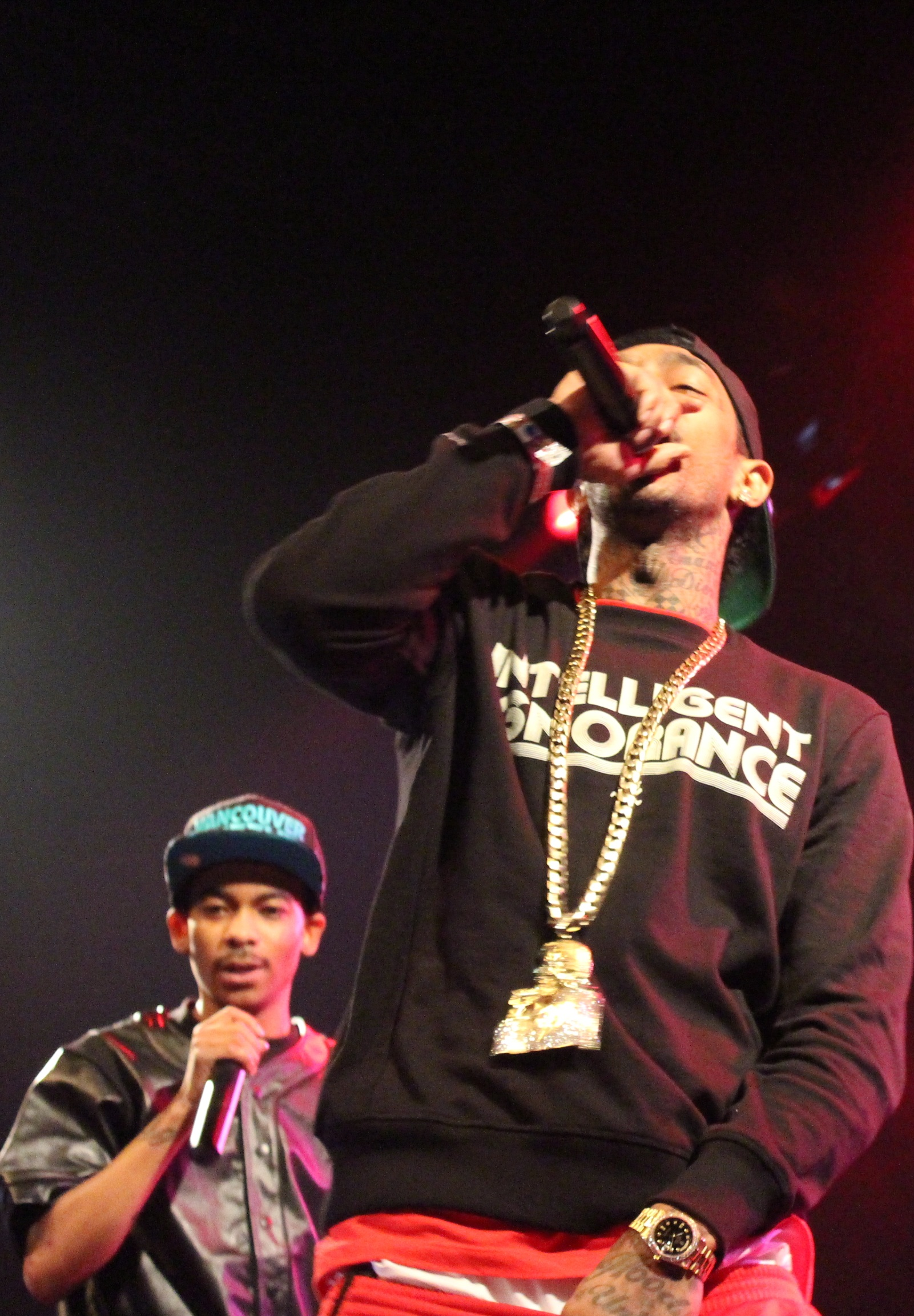
Nipsey Hussle (right) and TeeFlii (left) collaborated on two songs on the mixtape.

In November 2011, Nipsey Hussle released The Marathon Continues, following that he did not release a major project almost two years, while promising a sequel named TM3: Victory Lap. On August 6, 2013, Hussle announced that Victory Lap would now be his debut studio album rather than his next mixtape, and none of the previously leaked songs from the prior months will make the album. He confirmed that the track list and release date would be revealed very soon. On September 1 and 2, 2013, Nipsey Hussle released his previous mixtape X-Tra Laps, and a group of songs as singles to iTunes. This included various old mixtape tracks, "Thas Wat Hoes Do" featuring YG, "Rose Clique", "Rich Roll", "Keys 2 the City", "I Need That" featuring Dom Kennedy and "Run A Lap".

On September 16, 2013, Nipsey Hussle announced he would release a new mixtape titled, Crenshaw hosted by DJ Drama, on October 8, 2013. He explained the title saying, "This is my area. This is my home town. This is really like where I spent a lot of my time as a youth. Crenshaw is a foundation to my personality and my story. It’s where it took place at." He explained the mixtape consists of mostly leftover tracks,

"I recorded a lot of songs for the Victory Lap project, and I got a certain vision I'm going for with the project, and I just did a lot of work and I think I got what I was looking for with the Victory Lap album, and I still got a lot of great records. So I'm like, I don't wanna sit on the songs, and I listened to the playlist and it kinda sounded like Crenshaw, it sounded like the environment, like my upbringing. So I went in and did a couple more records, put a couple skits and just really themed it, and I'm like I'ma give them the mixtape first just to excite the streets again and remind people what the sound is, give 'em an idea of what the album might sound like. And really kinda like, create the question in their mind, 'if this is the mixtape, what is gunna be on the album?'"

On September 24, 2013, he revealed the track list for Crenshaw, which contained guest appearances from Rick Ross, Dom Kennedy, Slim Thug, James Fauntleroy II, Z-Ro, Skeme, Cobby Supreme, J. Stone, Dubb, Tai Phillips, TeeFlii, Zeke, and Sade among others. Production was handled by, The Futuristiks, 1500 or Nothin', 9th Wonder, Mike Free, Ralo, Wizzo and Jiggy Hendrix among others.

== Release and promotion ==
On October 2, 2013, Hussle released two greatest hits compilation albums to iTunes, Nip Hussle the Great Vol. 1 and Vol. 2. On September 24, 2013, Nipsey Hussle and Karen Civil TV released the first trailer for the mixtape, featuring him driving around Crenshaw, Los Angeles, and talking about his upbringing in the city. On October 3, 2013, he released a second trailer for the mixtape, also revealing 1,000 hard copies of the mixtape would be sold for $100 each. He explained his decision to RapRadar saying,

"It’s 2013. Whether we accept it or not, buying music is a choice, not a requisite. When I think of the psychology behind what makes me purchase an artist's album, it’s always a form of reciprocation. Almost like a token of appreciation after I experience the product. The reason I chose to charge $100 dollars each copy and only start with 1000 units is because I tailor making my music for those who are listening. it's not about stepping outside of what I’m known for in hopes of new discovery. What that means less is fans that are better served. I'm more or less focused on fully serving the ones that have connected already. That being said it's a value over volume thing. if I'm goin to offer a product made with no compromise or concession to the platforms (radio, A&R opinion, label bias) ect...ect..then the way we sale it has to change."

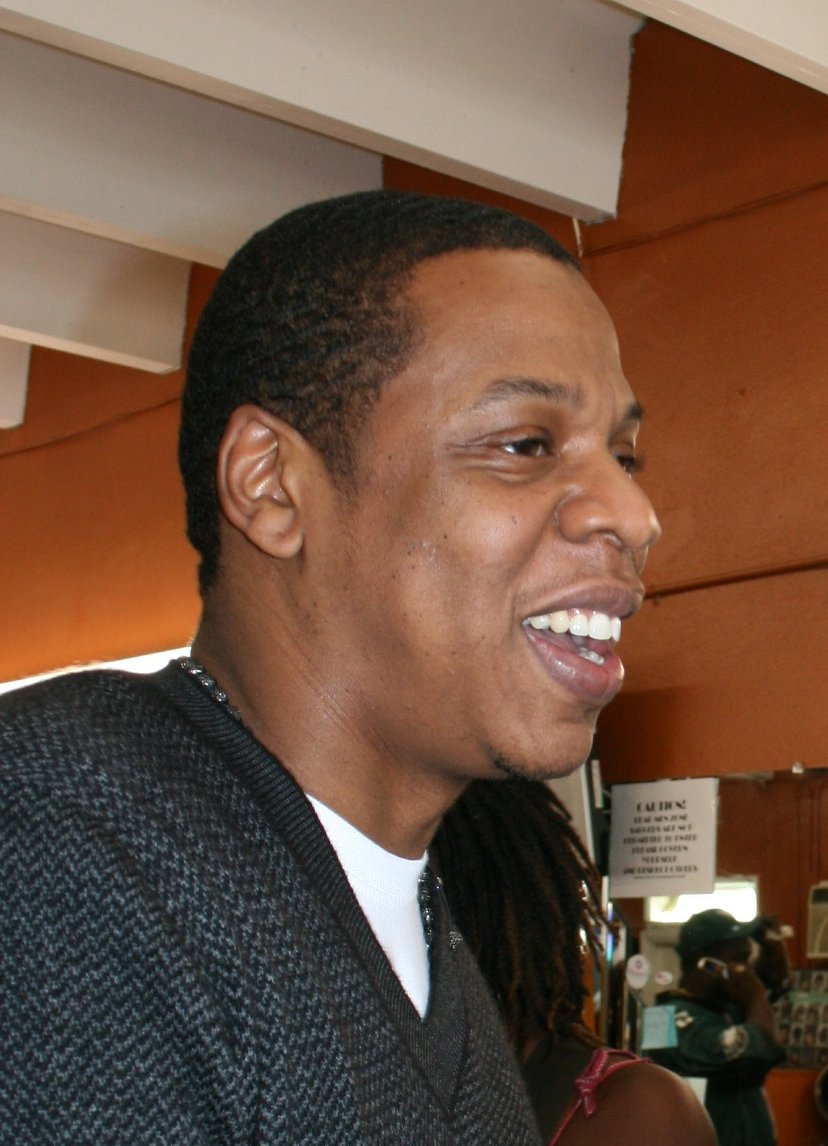
On behalf of owner Jay-Z record label Roc Nation purchased 100 copies of the mixtape.

As promised the mixtape was released for free on mixtape hosting websites October 8, 2013. At midnight, he began selling the limited edition hard copies at a pop-up shop in Fairfax, Los Angeles. The copies were sold for $100 and included a ticket to an upcoming local show of his, among other random incentives. Every copy was also numbered and autographed by Hussle. Other incentives for random purchasers included a personal phone call from Hussle, signed photographs in the mail, and an invitation to visit Hussle in the studio and hear an early version of Victory Lap before its release. Dom Kennedy, Glasses Malone, and the LA Leakers of Power 106 made appearances during the day.

Upon its release he reportedly sold out at the pop-up shop, selling over 1,000 copies in less than 24 hours, effectively making $100,000. Notably, Roc Nation, the label founded and owned by Jay-Z, bought 100 physical copies at $100 each. Shortly after Hussle announced additional copies would be sold for $100 at the Slauson Ave Store in Los Angeles. Given a cost of only 75 cents per unit to press the CDs, each sale of Crenshaw represents a gross profit margin of more than 1300% before recording costs. For this move he has received praise from rappers such as E-40, along with the already mentioned Jay-Z. On October 18, 2013, it was revealed that the album would be released to iTunes on October 22, 2013, with an exclusive bonus track. However, upon its release to iTunes it did not include a bonus track, but Hussle revealed that anybody that messaged him their receipt on Twitter would receive a bonus track.

The day of the mixtape's release Nipsey Hussle announced the Crenshaw US Tour to take place during 2013, revealing that the tour dates would be announced soon. On November 26, 2013, Hussle announced the tour dates, beginning on January 9, 2014, in Sacramento, California, and running until February 13, 2014.

== Singles ==
On May 18, 2013, Nipsey Hussle released "Smoking With My Stylist" as part of his new campaign to release a new song for every new 2,000 Twitter followers. Three days later, he released "Face The World" produced by 9th Wonder. On June 6, 2013, he released "All Get Right" featuring label-mate J. Stone. On July 17, 2013, Hussle released the song "Blessings". Six days later, he released "Summertime In That Cutlass" produced by The Futuristiks. Then on August 8, 2013, Hussle released the last promotional single from the mixtape "Change Nothing" produced by 1500 or Nothin'.

On September 26, 2013, Nipsey Hussle released the mixtape's first official single "Checc Me Out" featuring Dom Kennedy and Cobby Supreme. On October 2, 2013, Nipsey Hussle appeared on DJ Skee's Skee Live, with Dom Kennedy and performed "Checc Me Out". On December 2, 2013, "U See Us" was serviced to urban contemporary radio in the United Kingdom.

The day before the mixtape's release he released a leftover collaboration with Dom Kennedy titled, "Don't Forget Us". The music video for "Crenshaw and Slauson (True Story)" was released on October 11, 2013. The music video for "1 of 1" was released on November 7, 2013. On December 15, Hussle released the music video for "More or Less". On January 29, 2014, three more singles ("The Weather" featuring Rick Ross and Cuzzy Capone, "If U Were Mine" featuring James Fauntleroy, and "1 of 1") were released for digital download.

== Critical reception ==
Professional ratings
Review scores
Source	Rating
The Badger Herald	4.5/5 stars
BET	3/5 stars
HipHopDX	(positive)
Music Is My Oxygen	3.5/5 stars
RapReviews	5/10
XXL	3/5 (L)

Crenshaw was met with generally positive reviews from music critics. Louis Johnson of The Badger Herald gave the mixtape a very positive review: "He's a diamond in the rough. For fans of West Coast hip-hop, his music is infectious. Nipsey is proof that an independent artist can become a major force in today's world of Clear Channel sameness and major label monopolies. This is just the beginning, though. In a Tuesday tweet Nipsey said, '...I made a hunnit k today off my album throw away's.' If this is true, it's scary to think of how good his album will be." Bruce Smith of HipHopDX deemed the project a "free album" (their highest praise for mixtapes). He said, "The Bullets Ain't Got No Name series was music straight off Slauson Avenue; it was Hip Hop from a South Central state of mind. With his Marathon series, Nipsey offered himself as a Slauson boy, matured, and free of label politics. Crenshaw is where the two sets of projects meet up. While he may have never strayed far from the streets of Los Angeles, Crenshaw is like a homecoming for the artist that dropped the last two Marathon mixtapes, bringing the growth and maturity shown on the Marathon series back to a project that bears a close resemblance to the Bullets Ain’t Got No Name tapes. While not without its flaws, at its high points (of which there are many) Crenshaw is on par, or above what a lot of artists have put on shelves as of late."

Slav Kandyba of Music Is My Oxygen also gave a positive review: "Nipsey's superior delivery and energy is established early with "U See Us" and doesn't stop until well into the end of the tape's last track "Crenshaw and Slauson," a 12-minute composition with hidden track following a spoken-word outro. Crenshaw's best attribute isn't beat selection or the actual lyrics; it's Nipsey Hussle's persona. He's larger than life and relatable at the same time, not just rhyming but relating to listeners in the same fashion that Tony Robbins speaks at his seminars. Even though drug and gang references are still frequent, the value of Crenshaw as motivational music can't be discounted." Max Weinstein XXL also gave the mixtape a positive review saying, "Crenshaw has its moments, but it ultimately reflects the process of a rapper stretching styles and seeing what he’s most comfortable with. The exercise might not yield many immediate results, but it’s a necessary workout for an artist trying to please loyal fans and potential newcomers."

On December 24, 2013, XXL named it the second-best mixtape of 2013. They commented saying, "Nipsey Hu$$le changed the course of hip-hop releases with the promotional run for Crenshaw. The unsigned rapper was able to make $100,000 by selling 1,000 copies for $100 each. The price tag was part of his Proud2Pay campaign, which rewarded fans with concerts, new material and rare gifts. The music also held up to the expected high standards with a tape that took us right into the heart of his South Central worldview. Topics such as hustling and paper chasing were sharpened with his laid-back flow and paint-picture rhymes. With young stars like TeeFlii and Skeme to help him out, Crenshaw was an event mixtape/album that put the West at its rightful place." In 2022, Rolling Stone placed it at number 189 on their list of the 200 Greatest Hip-Hop Albums of All Time. The magazine's writer Mosi Reeves said, "Crenshaw is more than just a marketing gimmick. The music, airy and dramatic, presents a West Coast version of Rick Ross' luxury-rap formula, with Nipsey as the hustler balling out despite long odds."

== Track listing ==
No.	Title	Producer(s)	Length
1.	"Crenshaw Blvd"		0:20
2.	"U See Us"	Mike Free	3:25
3.	"Checc Me Out" (featuring Cobby Supreme and Dom Kennedy)	The Futuristiks	4:13
4.	"The Weather" (featuring Rick Ross and Cuzzy Capone)	Cozmo	4:46
5.	"All Get Right" (featuring J. Stone)	Big Blizz; Sarah J	4:28
6.	"More or Less"	Soundsmith Productions	3:04
7.	"4 in the Mornin'"	G.Ry and B. Carr of The Surf Club	3:29
8.	"Don't Take Days Off" (featuring Dubb and Tai Phillips)	Remixx	4:10
9.	"H-Town" (featuring Cobby Supreme, Dom Kennedy, TeeFLii, and Skeme)	The Futuristiks	5:16
10.	"Drop Coupes"	BandPlay	3:13
11.	"Face the World"	9th Wonder	3:57
12.	"Blessings"	1500 or Nothin'; The Futuristiks	2:52
13.	"Summertime in That Cutless"	The Futuristiks	2:48
14.	"Change Nothing"	1500 or Nothin'	3:22
15.	"If U Were Mine" (featuring Sade and James Fauntleroy)	Jiggy Hendrix	3:14
16.	"Come Over" (featuring James Fauntleroy)	1500 or Nothin'	3:39
17.	"Hate It or Love It" (featuring TeeFLii)	TeeFLii	4:21
18.	"1 of 1" (featuring BH)	Ralo Stylez	4:13
19.	"Go Long" (featuring Slim Thug and Z-Ro)	Ralo Stylez	4:56
20.	"No Regrets" (featuring Zeke)	The Colleagues; Sarah J	3:29
21.	"Crenshaw and Slauson (True Story)"	Wizzo; Minehli; DJ Dahi	12:10

== Charts ==
=== Weekly charts ===
Chart (2013–2019)	Peak position
US Billboard 200	63
US Top R&B/Hip-Hop Albums (Billboard)	34
US Billboard Heatseekers Albums	35
