= Twila True =

American businesswoman and philanthropist

- Born: California, US
- Occupations: Businesswoman, philanthropist
- Known for: True Family Enterprises; 1500 Sound Academy
- Spouse: Alan True
- Children: 4

Twila True is an American businesswoman and philanthropist.

She is the chief executive officer (CEO)) and President of True Family Enterprises. She is the founder of True Children's Home orphanage, True Sioux Hope Foundation, and the co-founder of 1500 Sound Academy music school.

== Career ==
She was CEO of Synthane Taylor, circuit board manufacturers. She resided in Hong Kong and China with her husband Alan where they operated True Innovations, a designer and manufacturer of office furniture, which was acquired by Li & Fung. After her return to the United States in 2012, she co-founded True Family Enterprises with her husband.

In October 2018, True signed a partnership deal with MonarchFx supply chain company, through her Twila True Collaborations banner.

True's jewelry designs made their debut at 2018 New York Fashion Week and featured along with the Zang Toi's collection.

=== As philanthropist ===
In 2006, while in China, she opened True Children's Home to provide medical care for orphans.

In January 2015, she co founded True Sioux Hope Foundation, with a head office in Newport Beach, California, a nonprofit organization to help improve the lives of the communities in the Pine Ridge. An emergency shelter for children, The Safe Home, was also opened by True at the Pine Ridge reservation in February 2017.

True has also launched the Twelve Cycles initiative to fulfil the basic feminine needs and education to the girls of the Oglala Sioux tribe.

She supports fundraising foundations including Oceana, and CASA.

=== 1500 Sound Academy ===
She co-founded 1500 Sound Academy in 2018, music academy in Inglewood, California, with James Fauntleroy and Larrance "Rance" Dopson. In May 2019, Roland signed a collaboration deal with the 1500 Sound Academy. In March 2021, the academy signed a deal with Yellowbrick to deliver on-demand online programs. In June 2021, Arizona State University signed a deal to start the joint online music program Professional Certificate in Music Production through its Herberger Institute for Design and the Arts. In November 2021, Fender and 1500 Sound Academy announced a partnership deal to provide scholarships.

In March 2022, a Taiwanese campus was announced to be opened in Taipei, with Chen Zihong appointed as the principal.

== Personal life ==
True is married to Alan True and they have four children.

In October 2019, the couple sold their house on the Harbor Island, Newport Beach to Chinese billionaire Eric Tan for $37 million.

== Accolades ==
- 2015 Most Influential - Orange County Register
- 2016 Entrepreneur of the Year - Orange County Business Journal
- 2019 Outstanding Corporation - CASA
