= Last Time That I Checc'd =

2018 single by Nipsey Hussle featuring YG

Single by Nipsey Hussle featuring YG

from the album Victory Lap
- Released: January 19, 2018
- Genre: West Coast hip-hop; trap
- Length: 3:45
- Label: All Money In No Money Out; Atlantic
- Songwriters: Ermias Asghedom; Keenon Jackson; Michael Cox, Jr.; John Groover, Jr.; Larrance Dopson; Christopher Brown; Zairyus Jackson
- Producers: Mike & Keys; Rance; Kacey Khaliel; Brody Brown

Nipsey Hussle singles chronology
"Been Down" (2017)	"Last Time That I Checc'd" (2018)	"Dedication" (2018)

YG singles chronology
"YNS" (2017)	"Last Time That I Checc'd" (2018)	"Suu Whoop" (2018)

Music video
- "Last Time That I Checc'd" on YouTube

"Last Time That I Checc'd" is a song by American rapper Nipsey Hussle, released on January 19, 2018 as the second single from his album Victory Lap (2018). It features a verse from fellow California rapper YG, and is Nipsey's first song to chart on the Billboard Hot 100 at number seventy-six.

== Music video ==
Directed by Sergio and Blacsam, the music video features Nipsey Hussle riding and hanging out of a Lamborghini through the streets of Los Angeles, being chased by police escorts. In another setting he performs in front of a blue wall with the Lamborghini, which is white, while YG performs in front of a red wall beside him with a black Lamborghini.

== Charts ==
Chart (2019)	Peak position
US Billboard Hot 100	76
US Hot R&B/Hip-Hop Songs (Billboard)	29

== Certifications ==
Region	Certification	Certified units/sales
United States (RIAA)	Platinum	1,000,000^{‡}
^{‡} Sales+streaming figures based on certification alone.
