= Dedication (Nipsey Hussle song) =

2018 single by Nipsey Hussle featuring Kendrick Lamar

Single by Nipsey Hussle featuring Kendrick Lamar

from the album Victory Lap
- Released: February 13, 2018
- Genre: West Coast hip-hop
- Length: 4:05
- Label: All Money In No Money Out; Atlantic
- Songwriters: Ermias Asghedom; Kendrick Duckworth; Larrance Dopson; Alexandria Dopson; Axel Morgan; John Groover, Jr.; Lamar Edwards; Michael Cox, Jr.; Ralo Stylez
- Producers: Mike & Keys; Rance; MyGuyMars; AxlFolie; Stylez

Nipsey Hussle singles chronology
"Last Time That I Checc'd" (2018)	"Dedication" (2018)	"Mary Jane" (2018)

Kendrick Lamar singles chronology
"Pray for Me" (2018)	"Dedication" (2018)	"Tints" (2018)

"Dedication" is a song by American rapper Nipsey Hussle, released on February 13, 2018 as the third single from his only studio album Victory Lap (2018). The song features American rapper Kendrick Lamar. It was produced by Mike & Keys, Rance and Mars of 1500 or Nothin', Ralo Stylez and Axl Folie.

== Background ==
Nipsey Hussle premiered the song on Zane Lowe's Beats 1 radio show. He said, "I think that record sums up the marathon and the idea of Victory Lap. I think that in three minutes, [I] hit every point that I want to represent musically and just as an artist".

He revealed he told his team to send his record "Keys 2 the City 2" to Kendrick Lamar, but instead they sent "Dedication" to Lamar. Hussle did not know that until Lamar told him about it when they met at the premiere of the film All Eyez on Me. Hussle stated:

I'm like damn I ain't even send that. But he sent it back and when I heard the verse I was really inspired. I felt like he killed it. He talked about something that happened the night of the Pac premiere. If you really listen to his verse, he's talking about me, Snoop Dogg, Top Dawg, and himself. We really had a convo. We had a conversation about just L.A. streets and about how the time might be right right now for us to really try to use our influence to evolve how we exist. From Bloods and Crips, just the tribalism that's going on out there. We were just wondering, we just had an honest convo like what y'all think? Is it time for us to really start that narrative off? And he speaks about that in his verse.

== Composition ==
The song sees the rappers reflecting on the role of dedication, hard work and patience in their successes, over synth production that is reminiscent of West Coast hip-hop and gangsta rap. Nipsey Hussle raps about working to bring unity in the streets, while Kendrick Lamar details his rise to success in his career.

Hussle recorded an additional verse for the song which was later replaced by Lamar's verse. Hussle's verse was later used in the 2026 single "LA Theme Song", the opening theme for the series The Drop: A Snowfall Saga.

== Charts ==
Chart (2019)	Peak position
US Billboard Hot 100	93
US Hot R&B/Hip-Hop Songs (Billboard)	33

== Certifications ==
Region	Certification	Certified units/sales
United States (RIAA)	Platinum	1,000,000^{‡}
^{‡} Sales+streaming figures based on certification alone.
