= Double Up (Nipsey Hussle song) =

2018 song by Nipsey Hussle featuring Belly and Dom Kennedy

Song by Nipsey Hussle featuring Belly and Dom Kennedy

from the album Victory Lap
- Released: February 16, 2018
- Genre: Hip-hop; trap; R&B
- Length: 6:01
- Label: All Money In No Money Out; Atlantic
- Songwriters: Ermias Asghedom; Ahmed Balshe; Alexander Chigbué; Axel Morgan; Dominic Hunn; Teddy Walton
- Producers: Walton; Axl Folie; IAMNOBODI; Rance

Music video
- "Double Up" on YouTube

"Double Up" is a song by American rapper Nipsey Hussle, released on February 16, 2018, from his debut studio album Victory Lap. The song features rappers Belly and Dom Kennedy, as well as additional vocals by Axl Folie and Zacari.

== Music video ==
An official music video was directed by Sergio and premiered on October 4, 2018. It is 11 minutes long and stars actors Lauren London (Hussle's then-girlfriend) and Jackie Long. The video's story begins in 2007, portraying Hussle as a drug dealer and London's character as an "apprentice". Hussle teaches London about how to sell drugs and asks her to make a drop-off to a client. London is almost caught by police, so she quits the job. Ten years later, Nipsey visits a mansion he is looking to buy and reunites with London, who is married to the seller (played by Long) and reintroduced as "Stacy". The man, who does not know of Nipsey and Stacy's past relationship, has his wife give Hussle a tour. Hussle purchases the house and hosts a housewarming party, inviting Stacy and Long. Stacy comes without her husband. Nipsey and Stacy spend time walking on the beach together during the party. At the end of the video, Hussle reveals he also has a new partner, whom he introduces to Stacy.

Belly and Dom Kennedy also appear in the video, in which they perform their verses during the party at the pool, which is filled with women.

Regarding the video, Nipsey Hussle told Billboard, "We wanted to expand on the idea of [the song] by telling a story of an abandoned love affair between a young hustler and his girl. The lifestyle ends up being too much for the girl and she leaves unexpectedly. Years later, the young hustler ends up fully legit and successful and runs into the girl and that interaction is where the story continues". He also added that the narrative was "autobiographical".

== Charts ==
Chart (2019)	Peak position
US Billboard Hot 100	65
US Hot R&B/Hip-Hop Songs (Billboard)	26

== Certifications ==
Region	Certification	Certified units/sales
New Zealand (RMNZ)	Platinum	30,000^{‡}
United States (RIAA)	3× Platinum	3,000,000^{‡}
^{‡} Sales+streaming figures based on certification alone.
