= Victory Lap (Nipsey Hussle song) =

2018 song by Nipsey Hussle featuring Stacy Barthe

Song by Nipsey Hussle featuring Stacy Barthe

from the album Victory Lap
- Released: February 16, 2018
- Genre: Hip-hop
- Length: 3:58
- Label: All Money In No Money Out; Atlantic
- Songwriters: Ermias Asghedom; Stacy Barthe; Amaire Johnson; Jonathan King; Alex Turner
- Producers: Mike & Keys; Sap; Johnson; CEO Mark Savage

Music video
- "Victory Lap" on YouTube

"Victory Lap" is a song by American rapper Nipsey Hussle and the title track of his debut studio album, released on February 16, 2018. The song features American singer Stacy Barthe and was produced by Mike & Keys, Sap and Amaire Johnson.

== Background and composition ==
The song was originally titled "Mean Streets", in reference to the 1973 film. The chorus, sung by Stacy Barthe, interpolates the song "Knee Socks" by the Arctic Monkeys, which mentions Mean Streets. The song features "bombastic production" and a "downshifting keyboard labyrinth". Nipsey Hussle raps about his gifts and a "rags to riches" story of surviving in his neighborhood of Crenshaw, Los Angeles.

== Music video ==
The official music video was directed by Sergio and released on December 31, 2018. Filmed in Tulum, Mexico, the video references lyrics from the first verse: "Flew to Cancun, smokin' Cubans on the boat / Then docked at Tulum just to smoke, look / Listening to music at the Mayan Ruins / True devotion on the bluest ocean, cruisin'". It sees Nipsey on vacation in Mexico, where he climbs an ancient Mayan pyramid and cruises on a boat. The video interchanges scenes from his trip with shots of Hussle in his Crenshaw neighborhood. His store, The Marathon Clothing, appears as well.

== Charts ==
Chart (2019)	Peak position
US Billboard Hot 100	100
US Hot R&B/Hip-Hop Songs (Billboard)	37

== Certifications ==
Region	Certification	Certified units/sales
United States (RIAA)	Platinum	1,000,000^{‡}
^{‡} Sales+streaming figures based on certification alone.
