= The Marathon (mixtape) =

Mixtape by Nipsey Hussle
- Released: December 21, 2010
- Recorded: 2010
- Genre: Hip hop
- Labels: Cinematic; All Money In
- Producers: Nipsey Hussle (exec.); Big K.R.I.T.; Ralo Stylez; Mr. Lee

Nipsey Hussle chronology
Bullets Ain't Got No Name Vol. 3 (2009)	The Marathon (2010)	The Marathon Continues (2011)

Singles from The Marathon
- 1. "Feelin Myself" Released: June 2, 2010

The Marathon is a mixtape by American rapper Nipsey Hussle. It was released on December 21, 2010 for free legal download and for download on iTunes. The mixtape was released by All Money In.

== Background ==
He released the mixtape around the time he was trying to get out of his record deal with Epic Records so he could release his debut album South Central State of Mind independently. The mixtape's theme is a "declaration of independence from the confines of the traditional music biz that forced him to endure over two years worth of delayed celebration for the still-pending release of his formal debut, South Central State of Mind."

== Singles ==
The first single from the album is "Keys to the City". The official music video was released on June 6, 2011 on Vimeo and was directed by Dan "The Man" Melamid, who also directed the video for Nipsey Hussle's 2009 single, "Hussle In The House". The song was released for retail sale on September 2, 2013.

== Controversy ==
On the first leak off the mixtape, "Mr. Untouchable", Nipsey raps a bar that says: "High 'til we die, so it's muthafucc a Detox" [sic] which Nipsey in an interview with Vibe, stated it was not a diss line to West Coast rapper/producer Dr. Dre and his now-shelved studio album Detox. He also maintained the diss was "...nothin’ personal. I ain’t never really reached out to Dre, or Dre ain’t never really reached out to me, so it ain’t a shot against him, it’s just, my focus is on what I’m doing now."

== Critical reception ==
XXL made the mixtape the 49th best mixtape of 2010 and praised Nipsey's ability to bring back an earlier era of West coast hip hop music.

== Track listing ==
No.	Title	Producer(s)	Length
1.	"Love?"	The High Standard
2.	"Keys 2 the City"	Djay Cas; ENG
3.	"Mr. Untouchable" (featuring Kokane)	Jaywan
4.	"Blue Laces" (featuring Mars of 1500 or Nothin')	Mr. Lee
5.	"A Million"	Cookin' Soul
6.	"Top Down"
7.	"Young Rich and Famous"	Caddalak Beatz
8.	"U Don't Got a Clue"	Wizzo & The Teamsterz
9.	"7 Days a Week"
10.	"Late Nights and Early Mornings"
11.	"I Be Killen Um"	Ryan Leslie
12.	"Call from the Bank" (featuring MGMT)
13.	"Grindmode"	Tim Ned
14.	"Dreamin"	Y$E
15.	"The Crown"
16.	"Mac 11 on the Dresser"
17.	"One Take 3"	Big K.R.I.T.
18.	"I Don't Give a Fucc"	QD3

== Charts ==
Chart (2019)	Peak position
US Billboard 200	179
