= The Marathon Continues =

Mixtape by Nipsey Hussle
- Released: November 1, 2011
- Recorded: 2011
- Genre: Hip-hop
- Length: 49:00
- Label: All Money In
- Producer: 1500 or Nothin'; THC; Wizzo; Mistah Mota; Le-Lo Lang Jr.

Nipsey Hussle chronology
The Marathon (2010)	The Marathon Continues (2011)	Crenshaw (2013)

Singles from The Marathon Continues
- 1. "Run a Lap" Released: September 2, 2013; 2. "Thas Wat Hoes Do" Released: September 2, 2013; 3. "I Need That" Released: September 2, 2013; 4. "Rose Clique" Released: September 2, 2013

The Marathon Continues or TMC for short, is the sixth official mixtape by American rapper Nipsey Hussle. The mixtape was released as a free digital download on mixtape hosting websites, and to iTunes on November 1, 2011, via Hussle's All Money In record label. The mixtape featured production by 1500 or Nothin', THC, Wizzo and Mistah Mota, Le-Lo Lang among others. Guest appearances on the mixtape included Dom Kennedy, YG, Cobby Supreme and Yung Brodee among others.

== Background ==
In August 2011, Nipsey Hussle announced that he was working on the follow-up to his previous mixtape The Marathon, a free project tentatively titled The Marathon Continues. He said there would only be a few guest appearances, with the mixtape being mostly "in-house", also revealing the mixtape would be released in about two months. On October 25, 2011, Hussle revealed the cover artwork to the mixtape. On October 30, 2011, Nipsey Hussle told DJ Skee that 1500 or Nothin' would provide the bulk of production on the mixtape, and that YG and Dom Kennedy would be featured on the mixtape. The mixtape was released on November 1, 2011, featuring guest appearances by Dom Kennedy, YG, Cobby $upreme, Rimpau, and Yung Brodee. The song "Who Detached Us" also contains a sample of a speech by Apple Inc. founder Steve Jobs. Production on the mixtape was primarily handled by 1500 or Nothin', among others such as THC, Wizzo, and Mistah Mota. That same day the mixtape was released for retail sale on iTunes.

== Release and promotion ==
On April 6, 2011, Nipsey Hussle released the first song from the mixtape, "Rose Clique" to celebrate reaching 107,000 followers on Twitter. Four days later he released "Tha Mansion" after reaching 109,000 followers on Twitter. On October 6, 2011, he released the audio and music video for the song "Forever On My Fly Shit", produced by Top Dawg Entertainment's THC.

Following the mixtapes release, it received high downloads on mixtape hosting sites, and Nipsey Hussle toured in the following months. On February 14, 2012, Hussle released another mixtape, TMC: X-Tra Laps that consisted of leftover songs from the recording sessions for The Marathon Continues. On September 2, 2013, in promotion of his eighth mixtape Crenshaw, the songs "Thas Wat Hoes Do" featuring YG, "Rose Clique", "I Need That" featuring Dom Kennedy and "Run A Lap" were released as singles to iTunes.

== Critical reception ==
Professional ratings
Review scores
Source	Rating
The Source	(positive)
XXL	(XL)

The Marathon Continues was met with generally positive reviews from music critics. Adam Fleischer of XXL gave the mixtape a "XL" rating saying, "From the jump, Nipsey dives right in, reminding listeners why they fucked with him in the first place on opening tracks “Road To Riches” and “Who Detached Us.” Nipsey keeps the heat coming, slicing through the meat of this mixtape, before finishing up strong on “Tha Mansion” and “Outro.” Overall, the 14-track offering with limited features definitely does its share of reintroducing fans with Nipsey’s nasty skill set and should have listeners still craving his long-awaited debut." Kidd Future of The Source also gave the mixtape a positive review saying, "Listeners are left with a new ambition & plenty to ponder as Diddy describes the separation between himself a marathon runner & the listener. Although we may find solace in TMC, the anticipation for South Central State Of Mind has definitely begun."

== Track listing ==
No.	Title	Producer(s)	Length
1.	"Road To Riches"		2:07
2.	"Who Detached Us" (featuring Steve Jobs)		4:51
3.	"Run A Lap"		4:23
4.	"Thas Wat Hoes Do" (featuring YG and Rimpau)		5:26
5.	"Everythang"		3:32
6.	"Fly Crippin'" (featuring Cobby $upreme)		3:57
7.	"I Need That" (featuring Dom Kennedy)		2:58
8.	"Forever on Some Fly Shit"	THC	2:55
9.	"Tommy Gunz" (featuring Yung Brodee)		3:07
10.	"They Know"		4:09
11.	"Rose Clique"		3:12
12.	"10 Toes"	ArchTheBoss	2:08
13.	"Tha Mansion"		2:45
14.	"Outro"		3:30

Notes

- "Fly Crippin'" samples "Bill Gates" by Lil Wayne.
