= Grinding All My Life =

2018 song by Nipsey Hussle

Song by Nipsey Hussle

from the album Victory Lap
- Released: February 16, 2018
- Genre: West Coast hip-hop; gangsta rap; trap
- Length: 2:55
- Label: All Money In No Money Out; Atlantic
- Songwriters: Ermias Asghedom; Askia Fountain; Shane Lindstrom
- Producer: Murda Beatz

Music video
- "Grinding All My Life / Stucc In The Grind" on YouTube

"Grinding All My Life" is a song by American rapper Nipsey Hussle, released on February 16, 2018 from his only studio album Victory Lap (2018). It was produced by Murda Beatz.

== Background ==
In an interview with NPR, Nipsey Hussle explained the details behind creating the song:

I told Murda Beatz I needed something for the club. I needed something that was up-tempo that could move people. Sonically, that's the inspiration. I spoke about a real situation that took place in Vegas. 50 Cent and Mayweather were there. Some niggas tried to rob one of the people that was with us for his jewelry. The charges got reversed, and it didn't go so well for the other guy. But other than that, I wanted to tell the truth. All my life I've been grinding. I stopped going to school when I was 14 and I was self-educated since then. But I pursued hustling and music full-time since then. It was just what the music sounded like to me. I wanted the album to be a collection of narratives and to represent real stories that took place in my life. So I had a real day, YG was hosting at the same club I was hosting at and 50 was there. We had all the cars out. And it was just a real night.

An original version of the song titled "Grindin" leaked on March 7, 2017, as a song from the soundtrack of the video game Tom Clancy's Ghost Recon Wildlands. The final version, titled "Grinding All My Life", resurfaced online in September 2017 before being officially released in 2018 from Victory Lap.

== Composition ==
The song has been described as "your typical Nipsey Hussle track – an aspirational street anthem that carries the torch of West Coast rap". Lyrically, Nipsey Hussle reiterates he has been "grinding", or working hard, his whole life and reflecting on growing up in his neighborhood and environment. He also recounts the aforementioned incident in Las Vegas.

== Music video ==
An official music video was released on January 20, 2018, as the first part of a two-part video alongside Nipsey Hussle's song "Stucc in the Grind". It begins with Hussle counting cash from a currency-counting machine, before heading out to ship orders, dropping his money off at Bank of America, and going to his Marathon Clothing store.

== Charts ==
Chart (2019)	Peak position
US Bubbling Under Hot 100 (Billboard)	4
US Hot R&B/Hip-Hop Songs (Billboard)	44

== Certifications ==
Region	Certification	Certified units/sales
United States (RIAA)	2× Platinum	2,000,000^{‡}
^{‡} Sales+streaming figures based on certification alone.
