= Nipsey Hussle =

American rapper (1985–2019)

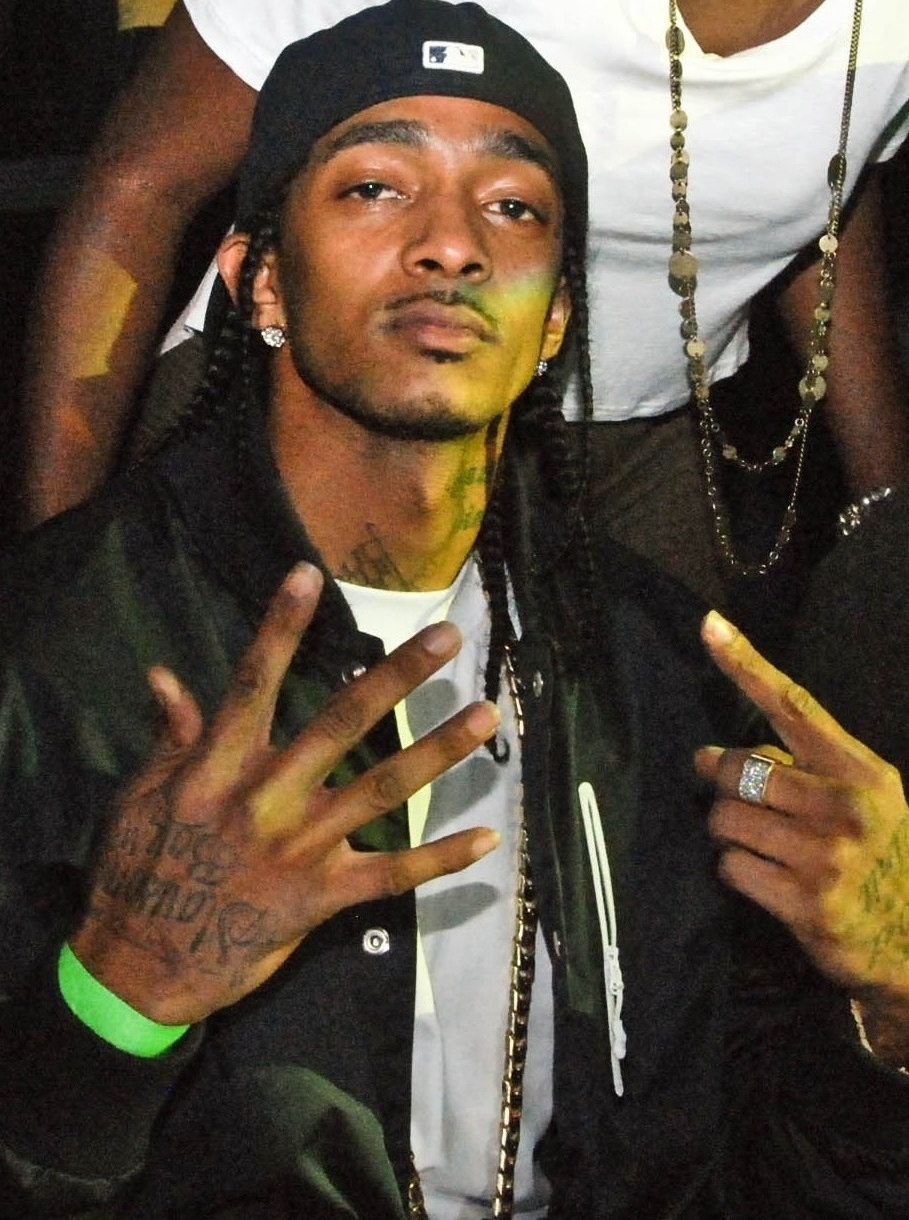
- Nipsey Hussle in 2011
- Born: Airmiess Joseph Asghedom; August 15, 1985; Los Angeles, California, U.S.
- Died: March 31, 2019 (aged 33); Los Angeles, California, U.S.
- Cause of death: Murder (gunshot wounds)
- Resting place: Forest Lawn Memorial Park, Hollywood Hills, California, U.S.
- Occupations: Rapper; songwriter; entrepreneur; actor; activist
- Years active: 2005–2019
- Partner: Lauren London (2013–2019; his death)
- Children: 2
- Musical career
- Genre: West Coast hip-hop
- Labels: All Money In; Atlantic; Cinematic; Epic
- Website: ihussle.com

Ermias Joseph Asghedom (born Airmiess Joseph Asghedom; August 15, 1985 – March 31, 2019), known professionally as Nipsey Hussle, was an American rapper, activist, and entrepreneur. Emerging from the West Coast hip-hop scene in the mid-2000s, Hussle self-released his debut mixtape, Slauson Boy Volume 1, to moderate local success, leading him to sign with Cinematic Music Group and Epic Records.

Born and raised in Los Angeles, Hussle gained a regional following for his Bullets Ain't Got No Name mixtape series, as well as The Marathon, The Marathon Continues, and Crenshaw, the latter of which was purchased 100 times by American rapper Jay-Z for US$100 each. After multiple delays, his debut studio album Victory Lap (2018), peaked at number 2 on the Billboard 200, received critical acclaim, and was nominated for the Best Rap Album at the 61st Grammy Awards. His 2019 single, "Racks in the Middle" (featuring Roddy Ricch and Hit-Boy), and guest appearance alongside John Legend on DJ Khaled's song "Higher", won Best Rap Performance and Best Rap/Sung Performance, respectively at the 62nd Grammy Awards.

Outside of music, Hussle inaugurated the Marathon Clothing store, which he founded along with partners Carless, the head of the agency, Karen Civil, and his brother Samiel Asghedom in 2017, and started a co-working environment which he named "Vector 90". On March 31, 2019, Hussle was fatally shot outside his store in South Central Los Angeles. Eric Holder, a 29-year-old man who confronted Hussle earlier that day, was arrested and charged with murder two days later. Holder was found guilty of first-degree murder on July 6, 2022. On February 22, 2023, Holder was sentenced to 60 years to life in prison.

== Early life ==
Airmiess Joseph Asghedom was born on August 15, 1985, and raised in the Crenshaw District of South Central Los Angeles by his mother Angelique Smith (née Boutte), a Black-American, and Dawit Asghedom, an Eritrean who came to Los Angeles in the 1970s. He was raised with his brother Samiel, also known as Blacc Sam, and his sister Samantha. Asghedom attended Alexander Hamilton High School in the nearby Castle Heights neighborhood, and dropped out before graduating.

At age 14, Asghedom left home and joined the local Rollin' 60s Neighborhood Crips, a sub-group ("set") of the larger Crips gang primarily based in his home neighborhood of Crenshaw. In 2002, at the age of 17, Hussle joined Buttervision, a creative multimedia Digital Guerrilla movement led by Dexter Browne where he was part of the BV Boys Sampler, Beats & Babes Vol. 1 DVD, and Shades of Butter Vol. 1 DVD. During that time, he completed the recording for his debut mixtape Slauson Boy Volume 1, and adopted his stage name "Nipsey Hussle".

His stage name, a play on the name of comedian and game show panelist Nipsey Russell, originated as a nickname given to Asghedom by a childhood acquaintance who respected his work ethic. In 2004, when Asghedom was 19, his father took him and his brother Samiel on a three-month trip to Eritrea. Asghedom credited the trip with inspiring him to become a community activist with an "entrepreneurial spirit".

== Music career ==
=== 2006–2010: Bullets Ain't Got No Name series ===
In December 2005, Hussle independently released his first mixtape, Slauson Boy Volume 1, to moderate local success. His debut project helped to build a small regional fanbase on the West Coast, and eventually led to Hussle being signed to Cinematic Music Group and Epic Records. In 2006, he appeared as a featured performer on the final posthumous album by 2Pac, Pac's Life. In 2008, Hussle released the first two installments in his Bullets Ain't Got No Name series of mixtapes, which helped to bring Hussle's music to a larger audience.

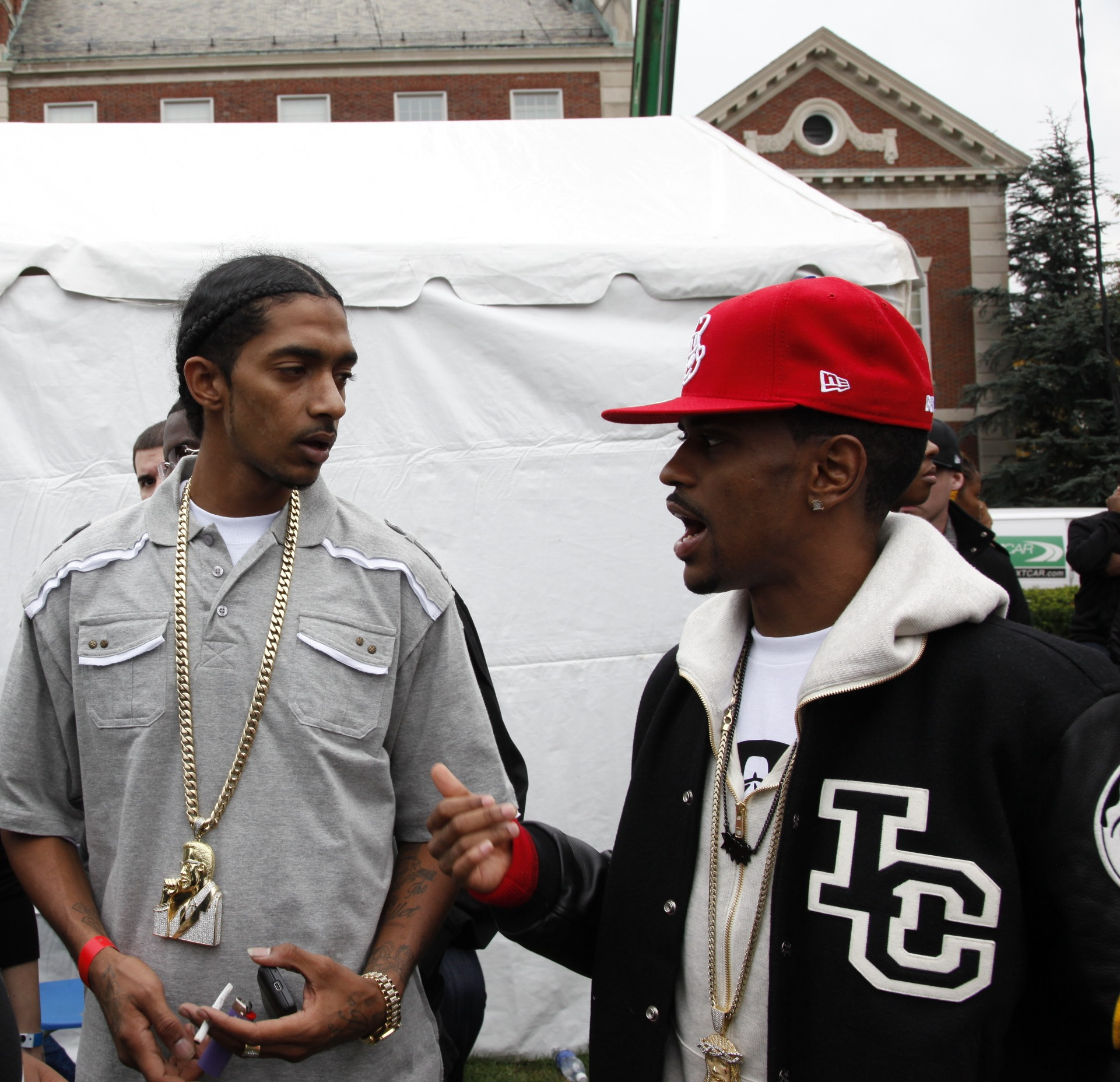
Nipsey Hussle (left) with rapper Big Sean in 2009

Nipsey's profile continued to grow into 2009 when he collaborated with Drake on the song "Killer", and also appeared, along with Snoop Dogg and Problem, on the song "Upside Down", from Snoop Dogg's 2009 album Malice n Wonderland. He released the third installment in Bullets Ain't Got No Name, as well as his commercial debut single, "Hussle in the House". Despite the song, which samples Kris Kross' 1992 single Jump, being well received by critics, it failed to make any impact on the charts.

After Epic experienced financial issues in 2010, Nipsey opted not to renew his contract and left the label. Not long after going independent, Hussle appeared on the song "We Are the World 25 for Haiti", and was featured by XXL Magazine as one of its "Annual Freshman Top Ten", a selection of ten up-and-coming hip-hop artists to watch. XXL labeled him "Most Determined" of his class, and LA Weekly called him the "next big L.A. MC".

Hussle was expected to release his debut album, South Central State of Mind, in October 2010. Prior to release, the album was supported by the single "Feelin' Myself" featuring Lloyd. While the production was set to be handled from J.R. Rotem, Scott Storch, Mr. Lee, Play-N-Skillz, Terrace Martin, and 1500 or Nothin', the album was set to be featured with the guest appearances from Trey Songz, Jay Rock, and Sean Kingston. Concurrently, he announced that he planned on releasing a mixtape with fellow rapper Jay Rock, titled Red and Blue Make Green. Following the release of a music video for "Feelin' Myself", the album was set for a December 21, 2010 release; however, both of these projects were eventually postponed indefinitely.

=== 2010–2013: Leaving Epic Records and The Marathon series ===
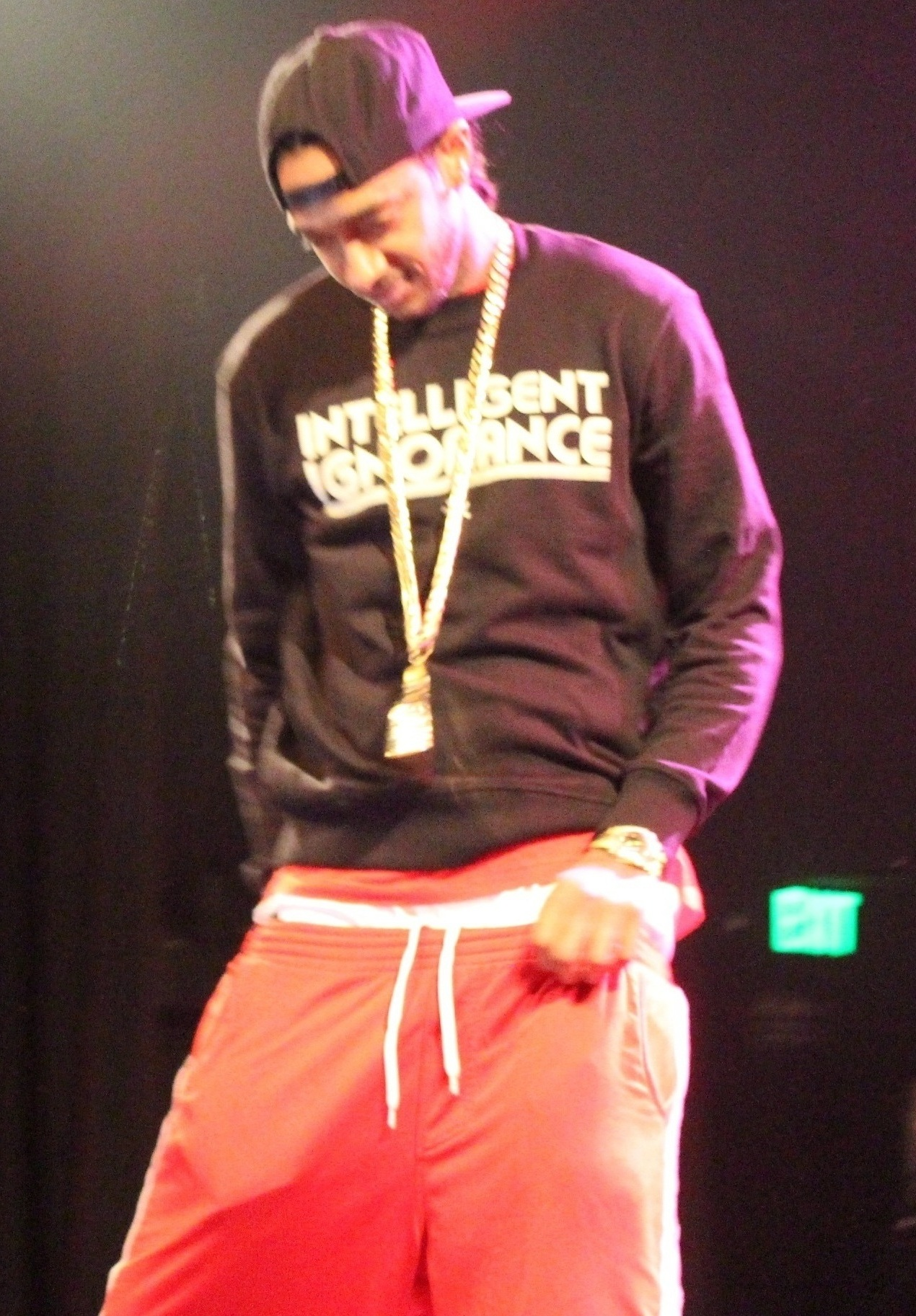
Hussle performing in 2013

After leaving Epic, Nipsey founded his own record label, All Money In Records. On December 21, 2010, he released his first All Money In Records mixtape, titled The Marathon, which featured guest appearances from Kokane and MGMT. On November 1, 2011, Hussle released a sequel titled The Marathon Continues, which featured L.A. rappers YG and Dom Kennedy. On April 17, 2012, Hussle released a collaborative album with fellow rapper Blanco, Raw. The album featured guest appearances from YG, Mistah FAB, Yukmouth, B-Legit, Kokane and Freeway.

In May 2012, Nipsey released a single titled Proud of That, marking his first collaboration with Florida rapper Rick Ross. Nipsey was subsequently featured on Ross' Maybach Music Group's song "Fountain of Youth", which appears on the label's second album Self Made Vol. 2. The music video was released on October 1, 2012. Rumours began to circulate that Nipsey would sign with MMG, and in December 2012, Hussle himself hinted at signing, however, he also said that he was still looking for the right label.

Hussle said that he would be releasing his third and final installment of The Marathon mixtape series with TM3: Victory Lap in 2013, after it was pushed back from its initial December 2012 release date. He also announced that he was planning on releasing a joint mixtape with fellow West Coast rapper and frequent collaborator YG. Hussle performed at the 2013 Paid Dues festival on March 30, 2013, in California. After deciding against signing to a major label, due to a lack of creative freedom, he choose to make Victory Lap his debut album.

=== 2013–2019: Crenshaw and Victory Lap ===
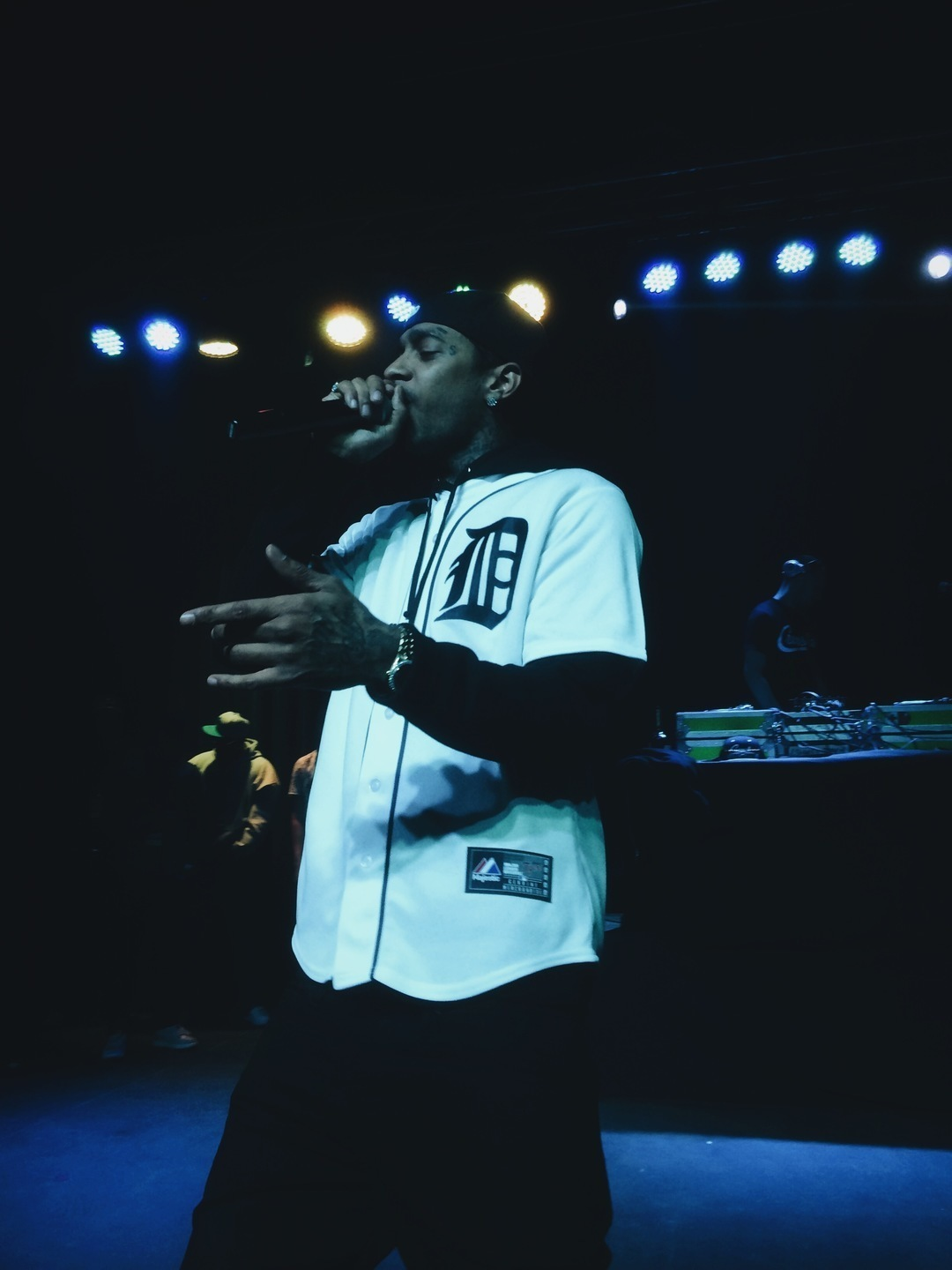
Hussle performing in 2014

Beginning in 2013, he released various songs from his upcoming mixtape Crenshaw, including the 9th Wonder produced track "Face the World", and a Futuristics and 1500 or Nothin'–produced track "Blessings". On August 6, 2013, Hussle announced that Victory Lap would be released as an album, rather than a mixtape. Prior to the release of Victory Lap, Hussle announced on September 16, 2013, that he would be releasing a new mixtape, Crenshaw (hosted by DJ Drama), on October 8, 2013.

On September 24, 2013, he revealed the track list for Crenshaw, which contained guest appearances from Rick Ross, Dom Kennedy, Slim Thug, James Fauntleroy II, Z-Ro, Skeme, and Sade, among others. The production on the mixtape was handled by the Futuristics, 1500 or Nothin', 9th Wonder, Mike Free, Ralo and Jiggy Hendrix, among others. He also released the Crenshaw documentary that day in promotion of the mixtape. On October 3, 2013, he released another trailer for the mixtape, and attracted attention when he revealed 1,000 hard copies of the mixtape would be sold for $100 each. Jay-Z personally bought 100 copies. He reportedly sold out all 1,000 copies in less than 24 hours, effectively making $100,000.

Upon the release of Crenshaw, Hussle said that Victory Lap would be released in 2014. On November 20, 2013, Hussle confirmed that Victory Lap would feature production from Ralo, 1500 or Nothin', the Futuristiks and DJ Mustard. He later confirmed more producers, including Don Cannon and DJ Khalil on the album. After the year went by with no new releases, Hussle released a new mixtape, Mailbox Money on New Year's Eve 2014, again releasing 1000 hard copies for $100 each.

Hussle made a number of guest appearances throughout 2015 and 2016, working with Jadakiss, Trae Tha Truth, and YG. In 2016, he released another mixtape, titled Famous Lies and Unpopular Truth. He commented on the 2016 US presidential election by releasing the single "FDT" ("Fuck Donald Trump") with YG; the song was written about Hussle's positive experiences with Mexican immigrants in the United States, whom Trump had criticized.

After delays, Hussle's debut studio album, Victory Lap, was released on February 16, 2018, debuting at number 4 on the Billboard 200, selling 53,000 album equivalent units in its first week. The album was met with universal acclaim from critics, and songs entered the Billboard Hot 100, including "Double Up", "Last Time That I Checc'd" and "Dedication", marking Hussle's debut on the chart as a lead artist.

Victory Lap was nominated for a Best Rap Album at the 61st Annual Grammy Awards in 2019, but lost to Cardi B's Invasion of Privacy. Over 1 year after its release, the album reached a new peak of number 2 on the Billboard 200 in April 2019 after Hussle's murder on March 31. His single "Racks in the Middle" featuring Roddy Ricch and Hit-Boy debuted at number 44 on the Hot 100, following his death. The song later peaked at number 26.

== Business ventures ==
Hussle's nickname came from his entrepreneurial spirit. He shined shoes for $2.50 to pay for school clothes at age 11 with a goal of a hundred shoes a day. Hussle sold his mixtapes out of a car trunk at a neighborhood strip mall at the intersection of Slauson Avenue and Crenshaw Boulevard. After leaving Epic Records, he founded his own record label. Hussle experimented with unorthodox sales strategies by selling expensive copies of certain mixtapes even while the songs were distributed for free.

Hussle's Marathon branding inspired Steve Carless in 2013 when he founded Marathon Agency with business partners Karen Civil and Jorge Peniche. They designed the talent-based brand to attract a diverse set of clients in all stages of their careers. In October 2016, Carless, the head of the agency, told Billboard that Hussle had invested "like over six figures" in the Marathon Agency and described him as "kind of like our silent partner".

Hussle opened the Marathon Clothing store on June 17, 2017, which he founded along with partners Carless, Civil, and his brother Samiel Asghedom. Opening the store at this intersection in the Crenshaw commercial district was important to him because he wanted to invest and provide opportunities in his neighborhood of Hyde Park. The store is billed as a "smart store", which bridges the gap between culture and technology by giving customers access to exclusive music and other content created by rappers through an app created by software engineer Iddris Sandu. The year before his death, Hussle bought the small shopping center where his store was located, after partnering with the real estate investor David Gross.

=== All Money In ===
Hussle created the record label All Money In after leaving Epic Records. He released his first major project, The Marathon, through the new label on December 21, 2010. He released subsequent projects under his label, including The Marathon Continues (2011), Crenshaw (2013), and Mailbox Money (2014). He also signed other artists, including J Stone, Pacman Da Gunman, BH, Cobby Supreme, Cuzzy Capone and Killa Twan.

Releases

- The Marathon – Nipsey Hussle (2010)
- The Marathon Continues – Nipsey Hussle (2011)
- Crenshaw – Nipsey Hussle (2013)
- The Coldest Story Ever – J Stone (2013)
- Mailbox Money – Nipsey Hussle (2014)
- 25/8 No Breaks – J Stone (2014)
- Boyz N Tha Hood – BH (2015)
- Slauson Boy 2 – Nipsey Hussle (2016)
- Neighborhood Watch – J Stone (2016)
- Written Stone – J Stone (2016)
- Optimistic – Pacman Da Gunman (2016)
- Stoney Montana – J Stone (2017)
- Optimistic 2 – Pacman Da Gunman (2016)
- No Pressure – Nipsey Hussle & Bino Rideaux (2017)
- Victory Lap – Nipsey Hussle (2018)
- Stone Cold – J Stone (2018)
- No Guts No Glory – Pacman Da Gunman (2019)
- The Definition of Loyalty – J Stone (2019)
- 60TH ST – Pacman Da Gunman (2019)
- Ground Zero – J Stone & Pacman Da Gunman (2020)
- Esta Loca Vida Mia – Pacman Da Gunman (2020)
- The Blueprint – BH (2020)
- The Definition of Pain – J Stone (2020)
- Stoney Montana 2 – J Stone (2021)
- Stoney Montana 3 – J Stone (2021)
- 6325 - Pacman Da Gunman (2021)
- Bulletproof Soul - Pacman Da Gunman & Hit-Boy (2022)
- The Definition of Sacrifice – J Stone (2022)
- Rollin Stone – J Stone & DJ Drama (2023)

== Acting ==
In 2007, Hussle played a small role in Bone Thugs-n-Harmony's semi-autobiographical film I Tried, which was directed by Rich Newey. In 2010, he starred in the film Caged Animal, alongside Ving Rhames, Gillie Da Kid and Robert Patrick. In 2015, Hussle was featured in a cameo "The Sexy Getting Ready Song" in the pilot episode of Crazy Ex-Girlfriend, rapping two bars.

== Community activism ==
Hussle wanted to focus on "giving solutions and inspiration" to young black men like himself. He denounced gun violence through his music, influence, and community work. He spoke openly about his experiences with gang culture. Affiliated with the Rollin' 60s, he often performed and worked with rival Bloods-affiliated rappers to set an example.

He funded improvements to neighborhood schools and spent time with students, also participating on panels about growing up in the area and the influence of gang culture. Hussle started a co-working environment which he named Vector 90. From his own experience, he believed that the Crenshaw area was being underserved and that young people would benefit from communal workspaces. He wanted youths to be able to take classes in science, technology, and mathematics at the center.

Hussle was also intimately involved in the planning and advisory stages of the Destination Crenshaw project that will showcase the history and culture of black people in his neighborhood. City Council member Marqueece Harris-Dawson said Hussle was in the earliest conversations on the project and was an integral part of the project's branding. In March 2019, Hussle had contacted officials from the LAPD to arrange a meeting with him and Roc Nation about what they could do to help prevent gang violence in South Los Angeles. The meeting had been scheduled to take place on April 1.

Hussle was murdered on March 31. According to Los Angeles Police Commissioner Steve Soboroff, department officials would meet with Hussle's representatives at a future date on these issues to continue the activist's work in his honor.

== Personal life ==
Hussle and actress Lauren London began dating in 2013. They had a son together in 2016. London has a child from a previous relationship with fellow rapper Lil Wayne, while Hussle had a daughter from a previous relationship. He remained very involved in South Los Angeles with his businesses, charitable activities, and the homes of family and friends. The locations for a magazine shoot were in the neighborhood.

== Murder ==
On March 31, 2019, at 3:18 p.m, Hussle was shot at least 10 times in the parking lot of his store, Marathon Clothing, in Park Mesa Heights, Los Angeles. The perpetrator also kicked Hussle in the head. Two others were wounded in the shooting.

All three victims were transported to a hospital, where Hussle was pronounced dead at 3:55 p.m. He was 33 years old. Police identified then-29-year-old Eric Ronald Holder Jr. as the suspect. Investigators believed Holder was known to the rapper and that the shooting was possibly motivated by a personal matter. On April 2, 2019, Holder was arrested by the Los Angeles Police Department and was held in solitary confinement.

On May 9, a grand jury indicted Holder on one count of murder, two counts each of attempted murder and assault with a firearm, and one count of possession of a firearm by a felon. After several postponements, the trial began in mid-June 2022. Los Angeles County Deputy District Attorney John McKinney served as the case's prosecutor, while Aaron Jansen served as head of the defense. Holder's attorneys argued that he did not intend to kill Hussle but had acted in the heat of the moment. McKinney argued, "He thought about it and he did it. That's all premeditated means. It doesn't mean he planned it for weeks". Testimony at the trial established that, immediately before Holder shot Hussle, the two men argued over a rumor that Holder had cooperated with law enforcement in an unrelated matter. On July 6, 2022, Holder was found guilty of first-degree murder and two counts of attempted voluntary manslaughter relating to injuries he caused to bystanders. On February 22, 2023, Superior Court Judge H. Clay Jacke II sentenced Holder to 60 years in prison.

Hussle's brother, Samiel Asghedom, was appointed the permanent administrator of his estate.

=== Memorials ===
Memorial in front of Marathon Clothing, where Hussle was fatally shot

Upon hearing the news of his death, celebrities offered their condolences on social media. Los Angeles mayor Eric Garcetti also offered his condolences to Hussle's family.

Hussle's memorial service was held on April 11 at the Staples Center in Los Angeles, with tickets provided free of charge.

Former president Barack Obama praised the rapper for his work in the community, writing in a tribute, "While most folks look at the Crenshaw neighborhood where he grew up and see only gangs, bullets, and despair, Nipsey saw potential".

The 25.5-mile (41.0 km) funeral procession to Forest Lawn Memorial Park wound through the streets of South Central L.A. including Watts, where he spent some of his formative years. The Nation of Islam provided security along the route that was "both respectful to the community and in a way that the community respects" according to Melina Abdullah. Mourners gathered at the Watts Towers along the route. The crowds lining the streets demonstrated the impact he had on this community.

Gang leaders saw how Hussle resonated with young gang members and used the opportunity to curtail violence in their own ranks. A cross-section of gangs marched together at a memorial for Hussle and later held summits between L.A. and Compton. Largely confined to black gangs, they agreed to stay away from each other's territory and attacking rival members. The peacemaking, which was a cease fire and not a truce, included hundreds of gangs similar to the truces of 1992.

== Remembrance and tributes ==
A petition was started to rename the intersection of Slauson Avenue and Crenshaw Boulevard near Hussle's store, Marathon Clothing to "Nipsey Hussle Square". On the day of his funeral, the council announced it was set to be renamed "Ermias 'Nipsey Hussle' Asghedom Square" to honor him and his contributions to the neighborhood. There has also been a push from the community to name the nearby Hyde Park station after him, according to Metro. A ceremony dedicating the at-grade light rail station on the K Line to him and the Crenshaw community was held August 6, 2022.

There was a strong artistic response to Nipsey Hussle's death. Within a few months, more than 50 murals dedicated to the rapper were painted in Los Angeles. One mural is in an alley near the strip mall where he was killed. Hussle's store has remained closed since his death.

Hussle was honored with a star in the recording category of the Hollywood Walk of Fame in front of Amoeba Music on August 15, 2022, the 37th anniversary of his birth. Councilmember Marqueece Harris-Dawson proclaimed the day Nipsey Hussle Day and handed the framed proclamation to Hussle's grandmother, Margaret Smith, who stood with Hussle's sister, Samantha, and his father, Dawit Asghedom.

Inspired by the books that Hussle mentioned in interviews, songs, and motivational messages, local chapters of the Marathon Book Club have formed. The list includes self-help bestsellers, cult classics and little-known books by black authors. Michelle Obama included "Hussle and Motivate" on her 2020 workout playlist.

On April 2, 2019, NBA player Russell Westbrook notched the second 20-20-20 game in NBA history in honor of Hussle.

On March 6, 2020, metal band Body Count released their seventh studio album titled Carnivore. The album features a song titled "When I'm Gone", which was written for Nipsey Hussle by the band's singer and rapper Ice-T. The song features a spoken introductory part in which Ice-T says of Hussle, "the outcry of love and support after his death was incredible, but it inspired me to write this song." The song also features guest vocalist Amy Lee from the band Evanescence who is also credited by Ice-T as having co-written the song.

In 2020, rapper Snoop Dogg released the tribute song "Nipsey Blue," which is dedicated to Nipsey Hussle.

Rapper Big Sean announced the song "Deep Reverence" in honor of Nipsey Hussle. The track was released in August 2020 and features Nipsey Hussle. The music video was released in March 2021.

Puma released the Marathon Clothing collection in September 2019 with 100% of net proceeds to the Neighborhood 'Nip' Foundation. The AMB store opened in September 2019 on Crenshaw Boulevard. This is another clothing company founded by Hussle with Cobby Supreme who was one of his best friends and an artist.

Hussle's longtime friend and collaborator YG dedicated his performance at the 2019 Coachella Valley Music and Arts Festival to the memory of Nipsey Hussle. At the 2020 Grammy Awards, DJ Khaled, Kirk Franklin, John Legend, Meek Mill, Roddy Ricch, and YG all gave tribute to Hussle in honor of his legacy.

The season 2 premiere of The CW series All American included a candlelight vigil at Hyde Park with a eulogy by the character Flip Williams (played by Lahmard Tate). Tattoo artist Keenan Chapman painted a mural just for the episode. The series included "Grinding All My Life" in its pilot, and series star Daniel Ezra was a fan. Characters from the series wore clothes from the Marathon store. Hussle had planned to appear in the season 1 finale but had "scheduling conflicts". A documentary on Nipsey Hussle is in development at Netflix, and is set to be co-produced and directed by Ava DuVernay.

Commentators have noted rapper Kendrick Lamar’s cultural and symbolic continuity with Hussle's music and advocacies. In tribute to Hussle, the music video for Lamar’s single "The Heart Part 5" shows Hussle's likeness synthetically overlaid onto Lamar's face accompanying his lyrics about Hussle’s legacy following his death. After the culmination of Kendrick Lamar’s rap feud with Drake in The Pop Out: Ken & Friends, comedian Josh Johnson narrated the story of Hussle's legacy to an audience with a routine on the Pop Out concert in Drake's hometown of Toronto, Canada.

=== Posthumous releases ===
Hussle's first posthumous album, a collaborative album with Bino Rideaux titled Prolific, released on August 14, 2026. It was recorded in 2017.

== Discography ==
- Victory Lap (2018)
- Prolific (with Bino Rideaux) (2026)

== Filmography ==
Year	Title	Role	Notes
2007	I Tried	Little Ricky	Supporting role
2010	Love Chronicles: Secrets Revealed	Janky	Supporting role
2010	Caged Animal	Ricky	Main role
2015	Crazy Ex-Girlfriend	Himself	Episode: "Josh Just Happens to Live Here!"

== See also ==
- List of hip hop musicians
- List of murdered hip hop musicians
