= Victory Lap (Nipsey Hussle album) =

2018 studio album by Nipsey Hussle

Studio album by Nipsey Hussle
- Released: February 16, 2018
- Recorded: 2016–2017
- Studios: Interscope (Santa Monica, California); Marathon (Burbank, California); Paramount (Hollywood, California)
- Genres: West Coast hip-hop; gangsta rap; G-funk; conscious hip-hop; trap
- Length: 65:30
- Labels: All Money In No Money Out; Atlantic
- Producers: Nipsey Hussle (also exec.); Sean "Puffy" Combs (exec.); Mario Winans; Mark Sanders, Jr.; Amaire Johnson; Brody Brown; D.O. Speaks; DJ Khalil; G Koop; IAMNOBODI; Kacey Khaliel; Mars; KingVay; Mike & Keys; Mr. Lee; Murda Beatz; Ralo Stylez; Rance; Sap; Street Symphony; Teddy Walton; YNG Josh

Nipsey Hussle chronology
No Pressure (2017)	Victory Lap (2018)	Prolific (2026)

Singles from Victory Lap
- 1. "Rap Niggas" Released: December 1, 2017; 2. "Last Time That I Checc'd" Released: January 19, 2018; 3. "Dedication" Released: February 13, 2018

Victory Lap is the only solo studio album by American rapper Nipsey Hussle. It was released on February 16, 2018, through All Money In No Money Out and Atlantic Records. It was Hussle's first major commercial release after releasing a string of mixtapes for thirteen years. The album debuted at number four on the Billboard 200, selling 53,000 album-equivalent units; It was the last project to be released during Hussle’s lifetime, as he was shot and killed on March 31, 2019. It reached a new peak of number two in April 2019, following Hussle's death. It received a nomination for Best Rap Album at the 61st Grammy Awards.

The album features guest appearances from Stacy Barthe, YG, Puff Daddy, Kendrick Lamar, Buddy, Konshens, J-Black, TeeFlii, The-Dream, CeeLo Green and Marsha Ambrosius, while bonus tracks feature Dom Kennedy and Belly.

== Critical reception ==
Professional ratings
Aggregate scores
Source	Rating
Metacritic	80/100
Review scores
Source	Rating
AllMusic	4/5 stars
The Guardian	3/5 stars
HipHopDX	4.4/5
HotNewHipHop	87%
Pitchfork	7.8/10
XXL	XL

Victory Lap received widespread critical acclaim upon release. Ian McQuaid of The Guardian commented that Nipsey Hussle "effortlessly claims his place as crown prince of G-funk's new school", adding that "his brags rasp as hoarse and righteous as a man in the middle of a three-day bender, riding beats built from oozing bass swagger and slinking Compton synths, as brash and gleeful as peak-era NWA. It's visceral West Coast rap at its unapologetic finest, as Hussle refreshes cliches of unstoppable prowess with the conviction of a true believer". However he also judged that "At least half the album feels like padding".

Sheldon Pearce of Pitchfork labelled Victory Lap as "the most gripping record in his catalog", also adding: "The hour-long album honors all the work he's put in and looks back at all he's achieved, but it also looks forward to all he has yet to build and all those he can still inspire. His tactics can be tone-deaf and without nuance, but he knows exactly who he's speaking to and for".

Trent Clark of HipHopDX concluded: "Minor potholes aside, Victory Lap not only boosts Nipsey's stock but it raises expectations for the next time he eyes a checkered flag. The benchmark for quality has been set and the race to officially hit the championship podium is only getting revved up". Online publication HotNewHipHop stated that Victory Lap "toes the line between classic and contemporary hip-hop. It captures the emotion of now, this victorious moment for Hussle, while still pushing for the permanence of a hip-hop classic. It's hard to tell whether Victory Lap offers a transient infectious feeling or life-long addiction, but this album should age well. The production is masterful, the features are well-placed, and Nipsey raps like he just won a marathon. The race for the victory paid off".

== Commercial performance ==
Victory Lap debuted at number four on the US Billboard 200 chart, earning 53,000 album-equivalent units, with 30,000 in traditional album sales in its first week of release. This is Hussle's first top 10 album on the chart. The album also debuted at number three on the US Top R&B/Hip-Hop Albums chart. Following Hussle's death on March 31, 2019, the album reached a new peak of number two on the US Billboard 200, earning 66,000 album-equivalent units (with 17,000 in traditional album sales) in April 2019, behind Billie Eilish's When We All Fall Asleep, Where Do We Go?. Three album tracks, "Double Up", "Last Time That I Checc'd" and "Dedication" also debuted on the US Billboard Hot 100 for the week dated April 13, 2019. On February 16, 2023, the album was certified double platinum by the Recording Industry Association of America (RIAA) for combined sales and album-equivalent units of over two million units in the United States.

== Track listing ==
Victory Lap
No.	Title	Writer(s)	Producer(s)	Length
1.	"Victory Lap" (featuring Stacy Barthe)	Ermias Asghedom; Amaire Johnson; Jonathan King; Stacy Barthe; Alex Turner	Mike & Keys; Sap; Amaire Johnson	3:58
2.	"Rap Niggas"	Asghedom; Michael Cox, Jr.; John Groover, Jr.; Larrance Dopson; Khalil Abdul-Rahman	Mike & Keys; Rance; DJ Khalil; Sean "Puffy" Combs	3:46
3.	"Last Time That I Checc'd" (featuring YG)	Asghedom; Keenon Jackson; Cox, Jr.; Groover, Jr.; L. Dopson; Christopher Brown; Zairyus Jackson	Mike & Keys; Rance; Kacey Khaliel; Brody Brown	3:45
4.	"Young Nigga" (featuring Puff Daddy)	Asghedom; Jahron Brathwaite; Axel Morgan; Clarence Lewis; Curtis Mayfield; Elgin Lumpkin; Jaire Kwayera; Groover, Jr.; L. Dopson; Cox, Jr.; Robert Reives; Sean Combs; Timothy Mosley	Mike & Keys; Rance; Nipsey Hussle	3:56
5.	"Dedication" (featuring Kendrick Lamar)	Asghedom; Kendrick Duckworth; L. Dopson; Alexandria Dopson; Morgan; Groover, Jr.; Lamar Edwards; Cox, Jr.; Ralo Stylez	Mike & Keys; Rance; Mars; Stylez	4:05
6.	"Blue Laces 2"	Asghedom; Groover, Jr.; L. Dopson; Leroy Williams; Cox, Jr.; Willie Hutch	Rance; Mr. Lee; Mike & Keys	4:10
7.	"Hussle & Motivate"	Asghedom; Askia Fountain; Charles Strouse; Derrick Okoth; Groover, Jr.; Mark James; Martin Charnin; Mark Sanders, Jr.; Maurice David Wade; Cox, Jr.; Shawn Carter; Torrance Esmond	Mike & Keys; Rance; Brody Brown; Street Symphony; D.O. Speaks	4:18
8.	"Status Symbol 3" (featuring Buddy)	Asghedom; Groover, Jr.; Cox, Jr.; Simmie Sims III	Mike & Keys	5:05
9.	"Succa Proof" (featuring Konshens and J-Black)	Asghedom; Garfield Spence; Garnett Flynn; Jeret Griffin-Black; Groover, Jr.; Abdul-Rahman; L. Dopson; Cox, Jr.	Mike & Keys; DJ Khalil; Rance	3:21
10.	"Keyz 2 the City 2" (featuring TeeFlii)	Asghedom; Braylin Bowman; Christian Jones; Groover, Jr.; Abdul-Rahman; L. Dopson; Cox, Jr.; Jacob Dutton; Travis Walton; Joshua Conerly	Teddy Walton; Jake One; Mike & Keys; YNG Josh	3:05
11.	"Grinding All My Life"	Asghedom; Fountain; Shane Lindstrom	Murda Beatz	2:55
12.	"Million While You Young" (featuring The-Dream)	Asghedom; Johnson; Dutton; Groover, Jr.; Edwards; Cox, Jr.; Robert Mandell; Terius Nash	Mike & Keys; G Koop	4:24
13.	"Loaded Bases" (featuring Cee-Lo Green)	Asghedom; Dutton; L. Dopson; Thomas Callaway	Rance; Mike & Keys; Jake One	3:11
14.	"Real Big" (featuring Marsha Ambrosius)	Asghedom; A. Dopson; Groover, Jr.; L. Dopson; Marsha Ambrosius; Cox, Jr.; Rebekah Muhammad	Rance; Mike & Keys	6:22
Total length:				56:21

Bonus tracks
No.	Title	Writer(s)	Producer(s)	Length
15.	"Double Up" (featuring Belly and Dom Kennedy)	Asghedom; Ahmed Balshe; Alexander Chigbué; Morgan; Dominic Hunn; Walton	Teddy Walton; Axlfolie; IAMNOBODI; Rance	6:01
16.	"Right Hand to God"	Asghedom; David Camon; Groover, Jr.; Edwards; L. Dopson; Cox, Jr.	Mike & Keys; Rance; Mars	3:07
Total length:				65:29

Notes

- "Succa Proof" originally didn't feature credited vocals by Konshens and J-Black.
- "Victory Lap", "Hussle & Motivate", and "Real Big" features additional vocals by Lauren London.
- "Dedication" features additional vocals by Alexandria Dopson and Garren Edwards.
- "Hussle & Motivate" features additional vocals by David Wade.
- "Million While You Young" features additional vocals by Brian Morgan.
- "Real Big" features background vocals by Alexandria Dopson and Rebekah Muhammad.
- "Double Up" features additional vocals by Axl Folie.
- "Double Up" and "Right Hand 2 God" features additional vocals by Zacari.

Samples

- "Victory Lap" contains an interpolation from "Knee Socks", written by Alex Turner, and performed by Arctic Monkeys.
- "Last Time That I Checc'd" contains an interpolation from "Money, Power & Respect", written by Jason Phillips, Sean Jacobs, David Styles, Earl Simmons, Herb Smith, Deric Angelettie, and Ron Lawrence, and performed by the Lox.
- "Young Nigga" contains a sample from "West District", written by Jahron Brathwaite and Noah "40" Shebib, and performed by PartyNextDoor, which itself samples "Only When Ur Lonely", written by Elgin Lumpkin, Timothy Mosley, Robert Reives and Clarence Lewis, and performed by Ginuwine; and elements from "(Don't Worry) If There's a Hell Below, We're All Going to Go", written and performed by Curtis Mayfield.
- "Blue Laces 2" contains a sample from "Give Me Some of That Good Old Love", written and performed by Willie Hutch.
- "Hussle & Motivate" contains a sample from "Hard Knock Life (Ghetto Anthem)", written by Shawn Carter, Charles Strouse, and Martin Charnin, and performed by Jay-Z.
- "Million While You Young" contains excerpts from A Little Bit of Business (Part 1) (2012), performed by Kyle Donovan and Don Peebles, courtesy of NV Magazine and New York Life Insurance Company.
- "Right Hand 2 God" contains a sample from "Getting Over You", written by David Camon, and performed by the Controllers.

== Personnel ==
Credits adapted from AllMusic.

Performers

- Nipsey Hussle – primary artist
- Alexandria Dopson – background vocals
- Brian Morgan – vocals
- David Wade – vocals
- Garren Edwards – vocals
- J-Black – vocals
- Lauren London – vocals
- Rebekah Muhammad – background vocals
- TeeFLii – featured artist
- Cee-Lo Green – featured artist
- Kendrick Lamar – featured artist
- Konshens – featured artist
- Puff Daddy – featured artist
- Stacy Barthe – featured artist
- YG – featured artist

Technical

- Andrew Grossman – mixing assistant
- Dave Kutch – mastering
- Derek Ali – mixing
- Cyrus "NOIS" Taghipour - mixing
- Ethan Stevens – engineer
- Garnett Flynn – engineer, scratching
- Jeremy Brown – engineer
- Mario "Wizzo" Fernandez – engineer
- Matt Jacobson – mixing advisor, mixing assistant
- Matt Schaeffer – engineer
- Matty Rich – engineer
- Ralo Stylez – engineer
- Rich Keller – mixing
- Roger Butler – engineer, programming
- Tarik Johnston – engineer
- Zachary Acosta – mixing assistant

Musicians

- Brody Brown – keyboards
- Dave Forman – guitar
- DJ Battlecat – talkbox
- Doc Allison – cello, strings
- Eric Choice – keyboards
- Mike & Keys – bass arrangement
- Rance – keyboards
- Uncle Chucc – guitar

Production

- Amaire Johnson – production
- Axlfolie – production
- Brody Brown – additional production
- D.O. Speaks – production
- DJ Khalil – production
- G Koop – production
- Jake One – production
- Kacey Khalil – additional production
- Rance – production
- Mike & Keys – production, additional production
- Mr. Lee – production
- Murda Beatz – production
- Mars – production, additional production
- Nipsey Hussle – production
- Mario Winans - production, additional production
- Ralo Stylez – production
- Rance – production, additional production
- Sap – production
- Street Symphony – production
- Travis Walton – production

Additional personnel

- Ermias "Nipsey Hussle" Asghedom – executive producer, composer
- Jimmy Fontaine – photography
- Jorge Peniche – creative director, photography
- Natalie Apadula – project manager
- Samiel "Blacc Sam" Asghedom – executive producer
- Stephen "Fatts" Donelson – executive producer
- Steven "Steve-O" Carless – executive producer
- Sean "Diddy" Combs – executive producer
- Virgilio Tzaj – art direction, design

== Charts ==
=== Weekly charts ===
Chart (2018–2019)	Peak position
Australian Albums (ARIA)	71
Belgian Albums (Ultratop Flanders)	137
Canadian Albums (Billboard)	14
Dutch Albums (Album Top 100)	40
French Albums (SNEP)	165
New Zealand Albums (RMNZ)	20
Swiss Albums (Schweizer Hitparade)	66
UK Albums (Official Charts)	56
UK R&B Albums (Official Charts)	7
US Billboard 200	2
US Top R&B/Hip-Hop Albums (Billboard)	1

=== Year-end charts ===
Chart (2018)	Position
US Top R&B/Hip-Hop Albums (Billboard)	90

Chart (2019)	Position
US Billboard 200	53
US Top R&B/Hip-Hop Albums (Billboard)	26

Chart (2020)	Position
US Billboard 200	135

== Certifications ==
Region	Certification	Certified units/sales
New Zealand (RMNZ)	Platinum	15,000^{‡}
United Kingdom (BPI)	Silver	60,000^{‡}
United States (RIAA)	2× Platinum	2,000,000^{‡}
^{‡} Sales+streaming figures based on certification alone.
