= 1500 or Nothin' =

American musical ensemble

- Also known as: 1500; The 1500 Choir; 1500 or Nothin Orchestra; The Fifteen Hundreds
- Origin: Los Angeles, United States
- Genres: Hip hop; R&B
- Years active: 2006–present
- Members: Larrance Dopson; Mars; James Fauntleroy; Brody Brown
- Website: 1500ornothin.com

1500 or Nothin' is an American musical ensemble composed of record producers, songwriters, musicians and music videographers, formed in 2006, in Los Angeles, California. With headquarters located in Inglewood, California, 1500 or Nothin' is composed of three internal divisions: 1500 Or Nothin' Music, 1500 Or Nothin' Video, and 1500 Or Nothin' Ancillary. The collective has lent their writing or production to releases for Justin Timberlake, Asher Roth, Jay-Z, Kanye West, T.I., Bruno Mars and B.o.B.

In addition, the 1500 or Nothin' (or The Fifteen Hundreds) are an 8-piece band that tours internationally and makes television appearances regularly with artists including Snoop Dogg, Lupe Fiasco, The Game, Faith Evans and Eladio Carrion. Its members are Larrance "Rance" Dopson, Charles 'Uncle Chucc' Hamilton, Lamar 'Mars' Edwards, Brody Brown, James Fauntleroy, Kenneth "Bam" Alexander, Alexandria Dopson, Carlos "Los" Mc Swain, and Jeret Black.

== Members ==
- Larrance Dopson also known as Rance – piano, drums, guitar, percussion, and CEO. Dopson is credited with constructing the Grammy-nominated crew. He had opportunities to work with super-producers Just Blaze, Bryan-Michael Cox, Teddy Riley and Tim & Bob which gave the guys their first shot at production on Bobby Valentino's self-titled album in 2005. That led to other collaborations with artists such as Tyrese. Grammy Award nominated producer for his work on Marsha Ambrosius' song "Far Away" along with his six songs on Lupe Fiasco's "Food and Liquor 2". In 2020, Dopson was named to the Ebony Power 100 List. Dopson co-founded 1500 Sound Academy with James Fauntleroy and Twila True.
- James Fauntleroy is a Grammy award-winning R&B/Pop singer-songwriter, whose repertoire includes the records, "No Air" by Jordin Sparks featuring Chris Brown (with over 8.5 million worldwide single sales), as well as numerous songs for such artists as Rihanna, Britney Spears, Brandy, Beyoncé, Timbaland, David Archuleta, Usher, P. Diddy, on for his work with group Cocaine 80's which includes producer NO ID and rapper Common to name a few. In 2013, Fauntleroy a large portion of the writing credits on Justin Timberlake's 20/20 Experience releases, Drake's "Girls Love Beyoncé" and Beyoncé's", Beyoncé and Jay-Z's Magna Carta Holy Grail. In 2016, he co-wrote a large portion of Bruno Mars' third studio album, 24K Magic.
- Lamar Edwards also known as Mars or Marz – piano, drums, guitar, percussion. Mars joined 1500 or Nothin' during his high school years. He has released two solo projects hosted by DJ Don Cannon, Life on Mars (June 13, 2009) and My Guy Mars (September 26, 2013). He was a contributor to Dirty Projectors' 2017 self-titled album. Also, he is a member of Smash Factory, a production company launched in collaboration with producer Lil' C and multi-platinum artist T.I. In September 2016, Mars released his third full-length project, a mixtape titled No Days Off, under the pseudonym My Guy Mars.
- Brody Brown – bass, piano, drums, guitar, percussion. In collaboration with Bruno Mars, the pair have successfully worked on numerous Grammy nominated tracks. In 2012 the pair was nominated for Song of The Year for "Grenade". Brown is also a collaborator for Cee Lo Green{'s}... album The Lady Killer. Brown was able to contribute both piano and bass to "Fuck You!" Mars and Brown also worked on Travie McCoy's single "Billionaire", as well as B.o.B.'s "Nothin' on You". He is part of Shampoo Press & Curl, a production and songwriting team, along with Mars and Philip Lawrence.

== Former members ==
- Kenneth "Bam" Alexander Jr – Drummer, producer, writer and singer. Bam has contributed to hits such as Jay-Z's "Show Me What You Got" from the Kingdom Come album released in 2006. Bam has also produced 2 songs that were featured in the 2009 film Dough Boys He has toured with many artists, including R&B artist Bobby Valentino, a former member of Ludacris' record label, Disturbing Tha Peace.
- Alexandria Dopson – singer, songwriter. She has lent her writing, production or instrument skills to records for Snoop's daughter, Cori B, and received writing credit Cori B's "Do My Thang".
- Charles 'Uncle Chucc' Hamilton – piano, drums, guitar, bass, percussion, vocals. At the early age of 5, Chucc was already developing his skills & talents as musician at his church where he learned to play organ, guitar, bass & the drums. He released a solo album Be Your Teddy Bear under Doggy Style Records on December 17, 2012 and a gospel album with The Zion Messengers, No One But You in May 2013. Uncle Chucc began to receive more recognition as a solo artist after recording the chorus on Snoop Dogg's, "Neva Have 2 Worry". He died on January 27, 2023.
- Carlos 'Los' McSwain – Drummer. Los has lent his instrument skills on records for J. Holiday, Destiny's Child and Snoop Dogg. He died on August 5, 2018.
- Jeret "J.Black" Black – singer, songwriter. J Black is featured on records such as "Christmas on Soul" with Terrace Martin featuring Snoop Dogg. He has recorded and toured with The Game, DJ Quik, Kurupt, Royce da 5'9" and Eminem.

== Touring ==
In anticipation of his sixth album Mastermind, Miami-based rapper Rick Ross teamed up with the 1500 or Nothin' band to give concertgoers a whole new experience for 'One Night Only on August 14, 2013 at Club Nokia at L.A. LIVE. Live on tour or for television appearances, the band had performed with artists such as Nas, Lupe Fiasco, Rick Ross, Snoop Dogg, The Game, Xzibit, T.I., Faith Evans, and Fort Minor. They have also worked with rapper Azealia Banks. They appeared at her April 2015 shows at the Coachella Valley Music and Arts Festival. They are currently working with rapper Eladio Carrion. They appeared at his shows in October 2024 at the Tiny Desk and February 2025 show at the Viña del Mar International Song Festival.

== Ventures ==
As a growing label, 1500 or Nothin' has partnered with Peer Publishing Company to create their own publishing company, 1500 Or Nothin' Publishing. They have signed artists Janae, Ally Brooke, and more.

1500 or Nothin' has also created the 1500 Sound Academy with member James Fauntleroy as one of the instructors. The facility offers courses relating to production, mixing, writing, musicianship, and management to aspiring music professionals.

== Band ==
=== Current members ===
Larrance Dopson - keyboards, MD, percussion

Lamar "Mars" Edwards - keyboards

Brody Brown - bass guitar

Kenneth "Bam" Alexander - drums

James Faunterloy - guitar, vocals, percussion

DJ Young Guru - DJ, programming

Just Blaze - DJ, keyboards, programming

=== Former Members ===
Carlos McSwain - drums (died 2018)

Jaret Black - backing vocals

Latoya Williams - backing vocals

Uncle Chucc - lead guitar, bass, vocals (died January 27, 2023)

== Awards and recognition ==
In 2012, 1500 or Nothin' had eight Grammy nominations and by 2014 were nominated for 21in total.

The 1500 or Nothin' band worked as co-music directors for The 2013 Soul Train Awards in Las Vegas, legendary keyboardist Greg Phillinganes in 2014. They have also been nominated and received accolades from ASCAP, BET, BMI and the American Billboards.
