= Steve Carless =

American music executive (born 1983)

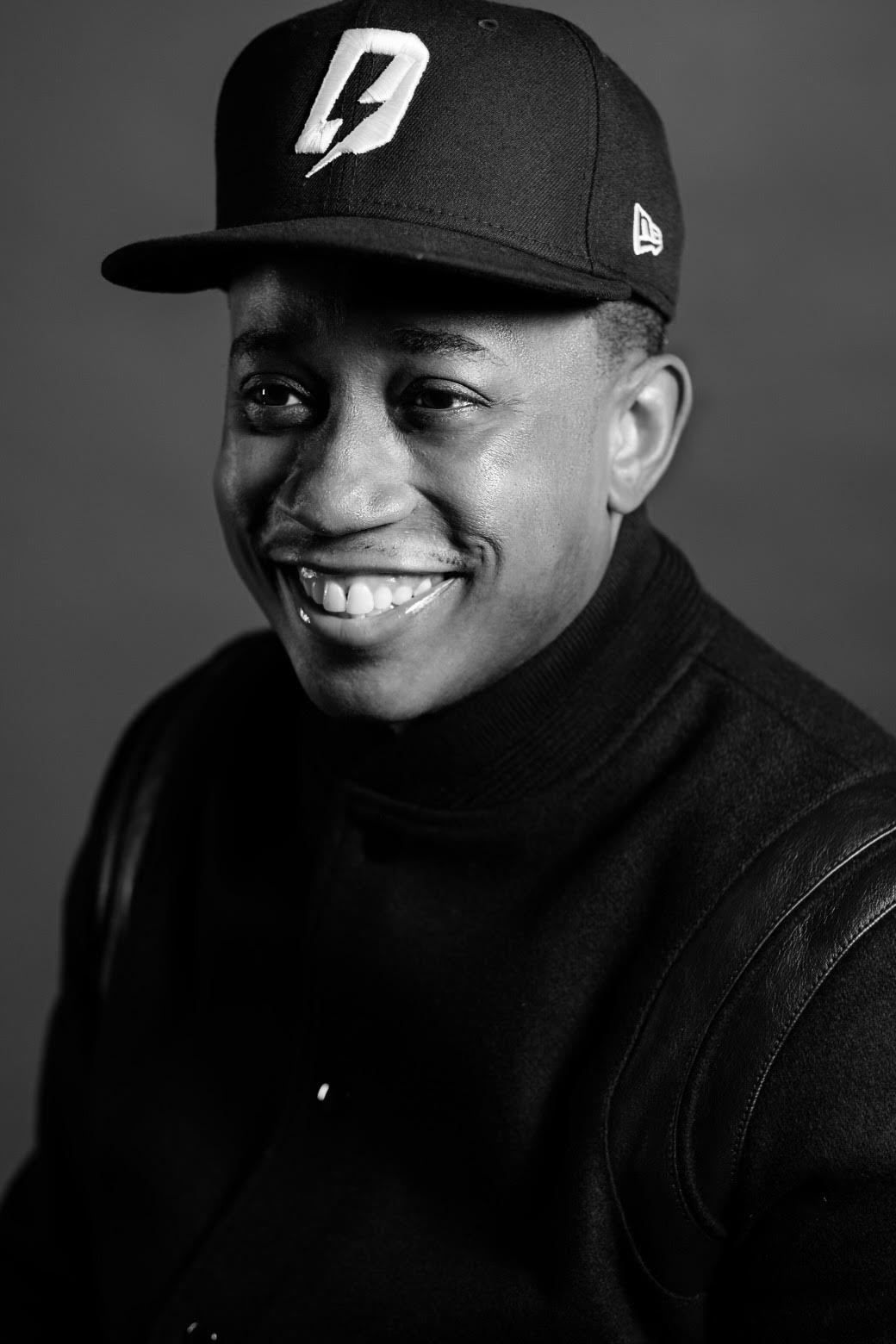
- Carless in 2023
- Born: January 31, 1983 (age 43); Roselle, New Jersey, U.S.
- Other name: "Steve-O"
- Education: Kean University
- Occupations: Record executive; A&R representative; songwriter; businessman
- Years active: 2004–present
- Labels: Island; Def Jam; Atlantic; Republic; Uptown; Warner; Defiant Records
- Website: defiantxrecords.com

Steven Pierre Carless (born January 31, 1983), also known as "Steve-O", is an American record executive, talent manager, tech advisor, philanthropist and entrepreneur. He is best known for working with Beyoncé, Polo G and Nipsey Hussle. In 2020, the duo received two Grammy Awards for the songs "Racks in the Middle" featuring Roddy Ricch and "Higher" with DJ Khaled.

He was previously an A&R executive and Executive Vice President for Republic Records, Senior Vice President of A&R and Artist Relations for Universal Music Group, Vice President of A&R for Def Jam Recordings, co-founder of Marathon Agency, and the founder of the Steven Carless Company. Carless was recognized in Billboard magazine's 40 Under 40 for 2020, as well as its Hip Hop Players Power List that same year, 2021, 2022, 2023 and 2024.

In December 2021, Carless was appointed President of A&R at Warner Records. Also credited as Head of A&R, Associated Labels and Black Music.

In 2023 Carless founded and launched Defiant Records in partnership with Warner Records

== Career ==
Carless has overseen the careers of multiple music artists, including Jeezy, YG, Dave East, Polo G, SAFE, Jadakiss, Fabolous and Nipsey Hussle. He started as an intern for Star Trak Entertainment and went on to become lifestyle and mixshow promotions at Island Def Jam Recordings thereafter. From 2012 to 2014, Carless was President of Jeezy's label CTE World and A&R Representative for Atlantic Records. In 2012, he began collaborating with Nipsey Hussle. He co-wrote YG and Hussle's controversial diss track "FDT" in 2016. In 2018, Carless collaborated with Hussle and served as management and one of the Executive Producers for the album Victory Lap, which earned a Grammy nomination for Grammy Award for Album of the Year. Carless also co-A&R'd Beyoncé's The Lion King: The Gift in 2019, earning an NAACP Image Awards for Outstanding Soundtrack/Compilation Album (2020). The song Brown Skin Girl on the album won a Soul Train Music Awards (2019), an NAACP award (2020) and a Grammy award (2021).

In 2020, Carless executive produced the Nipsey Hussle tribute at the 62nd Grammy Awards. In May 2020, Carless executive produced Polo G's album The Goat. He co-managed and executive produced Polo G’s first Hot 100 Billboard #1 single with RapStar leading into his first #1 album on the Billboard Top 200 album charts at 146,000 units with album, "Hall of Fame" in 2021. He also co-A&R'd a remix of Megan Thee Stallion "Savage" with Beyonce. In February 2021, Carless was named associated producer for his contributions to "Judas and the Black Messiah: The Inspired Album" released on RCA Records.

=== Republic Records Action Committee (R2AC) ===
He is a co-founder of the first Black music action coalition known as Republic Records Action Committee (R2AC), which works on social changes within the music industry. Carless is also Secretary of The Black Executive Excellence Association and a member of the Universal Music Group Task Force for Meaningful Change.

=== Partnership With Vybz Kartel ===
In 2024, following the overturning of his 2014 conviction and subsequent release from prison, Jamaican dancehall artist Vybz Kartel partnered with Defiant Records, founded by Carless. Kartel's single "Pretty Girl," produced by Now or Never Miami and directed by Rizzy, marked his first release under this new arrangement with Defiant Records.

== Accomplishments ==
=== First Black President of Warner Records ===
In 2021, Carless made history in the music industry by becoming the first Black executive to hold the title of President at Warner Records. This appointment marked a historic first for both Carless and the company.

== Personal life ==
Steven Carless was born and raised in Roselle, New Jersey and attended Abraham Clark High School, where he continues to reside. His heritage is of Portmore, Jamaica.

== Philanthropy ==
=== 2024: The Neighborhood Nip Foundation ===
In 2024, the Los Angeles Marathon partnered with the Neighborhood Nip Foundation, a charity established in memory of the late rapper Nipsey Hussle. Hussle's brand, The Marathon Clothing Co-Founded by Carless, participated in the marathon, with Carless, among the runners totaling 26.2 miles (42.2 km). Funds raised supported the revitalization of the Nipsey Hussle Plaza, the foundation's headquarters on Slauson Avenue and Crenshaw Boulevard. The plaza offers community services, including a free barbershop, recording studio, educational programs, and a STEM center. Puma sponsored The Marathon Clothing team.

=== The Defiant Foundation ===
In 2024 Carless launched The Defiant Foundation (TDF) to address wealth disparity in underserved communities. Focused on empowering young Black and brown individuals, TDF provides mentorship and programs promoting financial literacy and entrepreneurship. Carless believes that "connectivity with the next generation is essential in forging leadership through mentorship," and aims to create sustainable change by equipping youth with essential skills and knowledge.

== Music & Film Discography ==
Complete discography
Year	Album	Artist	Role
2013	Crenshaw (mixtape)	Nipsey Hussle	Executive Producer
2014	My Krazy Life	YG	A&R
2014	Mailbox Money	Nipsey Hussle	Co-Executive Producer
2014	Seen It All: The Autobiography	Jeezy	A&R
2015	Church in These Streets	Jeezy	Co-Executive Producer
2015	ColleGrove	2 Chainz & Lil Wayne	A&R
2015	Living Legend (Gunplay album)	Gunplay	A&R
2015	Remember My Name (album)	Lil Durk	A&R
2015	Top 5 Dead or Alive	Jadakiss	A&R
2016	Slauson Boy 2	Nipsey Hussle	Co-Executive Producer
2016	Still Brazy	YG	Co-Executive Producer, A&R
2016	FDT (song)	YG	Composer
2016	RED Friday	YG	A&R
2016	Hood Olympian	Lajan Slim	Co-Executive Producer
2016	Direct Deposit Vol. 1 Compilation	Various Artists	Executive Producer
2017	Paranoia: A True Story	Dave East	Co-Executive Producer
2017	Pretty Girls Like Trap Music	2 Chainz	A&R
2017	Friday on Elm Street	Fabolous & Jadakiss	A&R
2017	Direct Deposit Vol. 2 Compilation	Various Artists	Executive Producer
2017	Big Bossin Vol 1.5	Payroll & Cardo	A&R, Executive Producer
2017	Karma	Dave East	A&R
2018	Big Bossin Vol 2	Payroll & Cardo	A&R, Executive Producer
2018	Victory Lap	Nipsey Hussle	Executive Producer, Composer
2018	Paranoia 2	Dave East	Project A&R, Co-Executive Producer
2018	Stay Dangerous	YG	A&R, Co-Executive Producer
2018	Beloved	Dave East & Styles P	Project A&R
2018	Karma 2	Dave East	A&R
2019	4REAL 4REAL	YG	A&R
2019	Die a Legend	Polo G	Executive Producer
2019	Rap or Go To The League	2 Chainz	A&R
2019	Survival	Dave East	A&R, Co-Executive Producer
2019	Summertime Shootout 3	Fabolous	A&R
2020	The Goat: The Collection	Polo G	Executive Producer
2020	Ignatius (album)	Jadakiss	A&R
2020	The Lion King: The Gift	Beyoncé	A&R
2020	Savage (Remix)	Megan Thee Stallion ft. Beyoncé	A&R
2020	The Lion King: The Gift [DELUXE]	Beyoncé	A&R
2021	Hall of Fame	Polo G	Executive Producer
2021	Hall of Fame 2.0 (Deluxe)	Polo G	Executive Producer
2021	Jordi (album)	Maroon 5	A&R, Coordinating Producer
2021	Judas And the Black Messiah: Inspired Album)	Various Artists	Associate Producer
2022	Club Godfather	Bandmanrill	Executive Producer
2022	Sha EK “Face Of The What	Sha EK	Executive Producer
2023	Defiant Presents: Courtlandt Over Everything	Sha EK	Executive Producer
2023	Defiant Presents: Most Dangerous	Sha EK	Executive Producer
2023	Defiant Presents: Jiggy In Jersey	Bandmanrill and Sha EK	Executive Producer
2023	Defiant Presents: President OBandman	Bandmanrill and MCVertt	Executive Producer
2023	Defiant Presents: Bricks In The 6	DJ Sliink	Executive Producer
2023	Finesse	Pheelz and Bnxn	A&R
2024	Crying in the Club	Groovy	Executive Producer
2024	I Am Chippy	Teejay	Executive Producer
2025	Defiant Presents: Chain Gang Vol 1	Sha EK	Executive Producer

Year(s)	Title	Notes	Credited as	Ref.
2019	Inside a Change	Film	Producer	
2024	The Honorable Shyne	Documentary	Executive Producer	

== Awards and honors ==
=== Grammy Awards ===
Carless has won seven (7) Grammy Awards for his A&R work.

Award	Year	Artist	Results
Grammy Award for Best Rap Performance	2020	Racks in the Middle by Nipsey Hussle	Won
Grammy Award for Best Rap/Sung Performance	2020	Higher (DJ Khaled song) by Nipsey Hussle	Won
Grammy Award for Best Music Video	2021	Brown Skin Girl by Beyonce	Won
Grammy Award for Best R&B Performance	2021	Black Parade (song), Beyonce	Won
Grammy Award for Best Rap Song	2021	Savage Remix, Megan Thee Stallion & Beyonce	Won
Grammy Award for Best Rap Performance	2021	Savage Remix, Megan Thee Stallion & Beyonce	Won
Grammy Award for Best Melodic Rap Performance	2023	Wait for U, Future (rapper) Ft Drake (musician)	Won

=== Signal Awards ===
Carless has won four (4) awards for Blog Era Podcast as an Executive Producer.

Award	Year	Show	Results
Listener's Choice Documentary	2023	Blog Era Podcast	Won
Gold Documentary	2023	Blog Era Podcast	Won
Listener's Choice Arts, Culture & Lifestyle	2023	Blog Era Podcast	Won
Bronze Art's, Culture & Lifestyle	2023	Blog Era Podcast	Won
