= Waddup =

2021 single by PGF Nuk

Single by PGF Nuk

from the album Switch Music
- Released: October 26, 2021
- Genre: Hip hop; drill
- Length: 2:01
- Label: Defiant
- Songwriters: Virgil Gibson; Marcus Spruiell
- Producer: Fatman Beatzz

PGF Nuk singles chronology
"Skeet off the Lot" (2021)	"Waddup" (2021)	"Glock with a Switch" (2021)

Music video
- "Waddup" on YouTube

Remix cover
- Cover art of the official remix

Remix music video
- "Waddup (Remix)" on YouTube

"Waddup" is a song by American rapper PGF Nuk, released on October 26, 2021, and produced by Fatman Beatzz. It is considered his breakout single. An official remix of the song featuring American rapper Polo G was released on April 2, 2022 through Defiant Records, serving as the lead single of Nuk's debut studio album Switch Music (2022).

== Background ==
The song began as a freestyle that PGF Nuk was rapping to a beat while making bacon. His girlfriend recorded it unbeknownst to him, aware that he likes to keep track of his freestyles. In October 2021, the song was released alongside a music video. Upon its release, the song went viral, leading to PGF Nuk's rise to prominence.

== Composition and reception ==
"Waddup" is a drill song. It features "terse verses in a wrought-iron flow, lean percussion, a sparse synth melody as chilly as a dusty pipe organ". Leor Galil of Chicago Reader praised the song, commenting that "superficially it sounds like a pretty standard drill track", but "Nuk puts it over the top with his style".

== Remixes ==
In January 2022, Chicago rapper and PGF Nuk's cousin by marriage Polo G posted a video of himself rapping along to the song in his car. He was featured on the official remix of the song, released on April 2, 2022. This version became more popular than the original, propelling Nuk to further recognition, and served as the lead single from his debut studio album Switch Music. A music video for the remix was also released and has amassed over 30 million views on YouTube.

The remix featuring Polo G received generally positive reviews. Tom Breihan of Stereogum wrote, "Polo's verse on the remix is strong; it gives him a chance to show that he can do primordial drill shit as well as the sad singsong stuff that made him famous. But Polo doesn't leave as much of an impression as Nuk, whose snarling charisma somehow comes through even more strongly when he's got an actual star on the track with him." Joey Echevarria of XXL wrote that the beat "provides the perfect undertone for the fierce bars both Chicago drill rhymers laid down, putting any and all opps on notice all through the summer."

A second remix of the song was released as a track from Switch Music; it features American rapper G Herbo and is titled "Waddup (Swervo Mix)".

== Charts ==
Chart performance for "Waddup" (Remix)
Chart (2022)	Peak position
US Bubbling Under Hot 100 (Billboard)	20
US Hot R&B/Hip-Hop Songs (Billboard)	44

== Certifications ==
Certifications for "Waddup"
Region	Certification	Certified units/sales
United States (RIAA)	Platinum	1,000,000^{‡}
^{‡} Sales+streaming figures based on certification alone.
