= Moore Kismet =

American music producer and visual artist (born 2004)

- Also known as: Selfworth
- Born: Omar Gregory Davis; 4 December 2004 (age 21)
- Origin: Los Angeles, California
- Genres: EDM, dubstep, trap, future bass
- Instruments: DJ, record producer
- Years active: 2016–present
- Labels: Universal; RCA; Thrive Music; Warner; Bassrush Records; Ophelia; Vision; Colour Vision Records; Never Say Die; Disciple; Nightmode; Monstercat; Owsla; ArtbyFORM; Esydia; Nova Lotus; Sable Valley; UKF; Monta; Dome of Doom

Omar Gregory Davis (born December 4, 2004), known by their stage name Moore Kismet, is an American DJ, songwriter, visual artist, music producer and filmmaker. Davis began learning how to make music at a young age and rose to fame after several releases with Never Say Die Records. Davis released their debut album Universe in 2022, and released their follow up album Saturate Your World! in 2025.

== Career ==
Davis had been producing music at a young age in FL Studio, mainly being inspired by trance music and progressive house. When Davis began publicly sharing their music, they posted music under several different aliases; however, they would later go on to focus their efforts on the Moore Kismet project. Davis would go on to post several of remixes of popular songs to their SoundCloud account, where they would begin to gain a following.

In 2019, Davis played their first DJ mix at the Asteria Arts & Music Festival in Charlotte County, Florida. Later that year in August, Davis would become the youngest person to release on the independent record label Never Say Die, with the song "Mutant", their collaboration with SHARPS. In 2021, at age 16, Davis became the youngest artist to perform at EDC Las Vegas, as well as Lollapalooza.

In August 2026, Davis premiered their debut short film The view is great! at the Regal Cinemas in North Hollywood, as part of the 48 Hour Film Project.

== Personal life ==
Davis is non-binary, using they/them pronouns.

== Discography ==
=== Studio albums ===
Title	Details
Universe	Released: June 24, 2022; Label: Thrive Music; Format: Digital download, streaming
Saturate Your World!	Released: June 27, 2025; Label: Thrive Music; Format: Digital download, streaming

=== Extended plays ===
Title	Details
Trials	Released: September 30, 2017; Label: Self-released; Format: Digital download, streaming
Hues	Released: June 8, 2018; Label: Self-released; Format: Digital download
Character	Released: July 19, 2019; Label: Never Say Die Records; Format: Digital download, streaming
Revenge of the Unicorns	Released: August 14, 2020; Label: Never Say Die Records; Format: Digital download, streaming
Hold Up (Remixes) (with Whipped Cream, Big Freedia, and Uniiqu3)	Released: August 19, 2022; Label: Thrive Music; Format: Digital download, streaming
Unicorn Magic Vol. 1	Released: March 3, 2023; Label: Self-released; Format: Digital download
Huemor Me	Released: May 10, 2024; Label: Sable Valley Records; Format: Digital download, streaming
The Unicorn Who Believed In Love	Released: February 9, 2026; Label: Monstercat; Format: Digital download, streaming

=== Compilations ===
Title	Details
Another Year of Universe	Released: June 24, 2023; Label: Self-released; Format: Digital download

=== Singles ===
==== As lead artist ====
Title	Year	Album	Label
"Haiku"	2017	Non-album singles	Quota
"Haiku" (VIP)	2017	Trials	Quota
"Attention Deficit" (feat. Otakufreak)	2017	Trials	Self-released
"Standby"	2017	Trials	Quota
"Like You"	2018	Non-album singles	Human Error
"Like You" (VIP)	2018	Non-album singles	Human Error
"Hues" (with Flowerkid)	2018	Hues	Self-released
"Sometimes"	2018	Hues	Self-released
"Void"	2018	Non-album singles	Self-released
"Bassic Bitch" (Bass VIP)	2018	Hues	Self-released
"Void" (VIP)	2018	Non-album singles	Self-released
"Opposites"	2019	Non-album singles	Self-released
"Mutant" (with SHARPS)	2019	Non-album singles	Never Say Die Records
"Escape"	2019	Character	Never Say Die Records
"Flair" (featuring Momma Kismet)	2020	Revenge Of The Unicorns	Never Say Die Records
"Adore" (with Leotrix)	2020	Revenge Of The Unicorns	Never Say Die Records
"Drift" (featuring Bajillionaire)	2020	Non-album singles	Bassrush Records
"Beauty Is A Facade"	2020	Non-album singles	Bassrush Records
"You Should Run" (featuring Pauline Herr)	2020	Non-album singles	Nightmode
"Rumor" (featuring WYN)	2021	Universe	Thrive Music
"Vendetta For Cupid" (featuring TYGKO) (Note: With the B-sides "Flight of the Superiority Complex" and "Shadow Soldier".)	2021	Universe	Thrive Music
"Autonomy" (featuring Torr)	2021	Universe	Thrive Music
"Flourish" (with Laxcity) (Note: With the B-sides "Ultraviolet" and "Quest".)	2021	Universe	Thrive Music
"Call Of The Unicorn" (featuring Tasha Baxter)	2021	Universe	Thrive Music
"A Wandering Chance"	2021	Non-album single	Self-released
"Parallel Heartbreak" (featuring Pauline Herr)	2022	Universe	Thrive Music
"Hold Up" (with Whipped Cream, Big Freedia, and Uniiqu3)	2022	Hold Up (Remixes)	Thrive Music
"Wasteland"	2022	Universe	Thrive Music
"Forte"	2022	Non-album singles	Thrive Music
"Three Little Words" (featuring Anna Dellaria)	2023	Non-album singles	Thrive Music
"Run Away!"	2023	Non-album singles	Thrive Music
"Girls On Bread"	2023	Non-album singles	Thrive Music
"Keep My Cool"	2023	Non-album singles	Self-released
"Energy" (with WINK)	2024	Huemor Me	Sable Valley Records
"Harness" (with Wavedash)	2024	Huemor Me	Sable Valley Records
"How 2 Build A Better Boy"	2024	Huemor Me	Sable Valley Records
"Overthinking Out Loud"	2024	Non-album singles	UKF
"Sun Comes Up"	2024	Non-album singles	Self-released
"BITTER! (for the lack of a better word)"	2025	Saturate Your World!	Thrive Music
"come2find" (featuring YAOUNDÉBOXINGCLUB)	2025	Saturate Your World!	Thrive Music
"PLEASURE" (Note: With the B-side "Rainbowfhish".)	2025	Saturate Your World!	Thrive Music
"TEAR U APART" (with Luma)	2025	Saturate Your World!	Thrive Music
"WHY2K!" (with Wherefore)	2025	Saturate Your World!	Thrive Music
"need2know" (with Arya)	2025	Non-album singles	Nightmode
"BLUE2TH!" (with Lunnari and kyva)	2025	Non-album singles	Monta Records
"IDONTBELIEVEU!"	2025	Non-album singles	Aural Unicorns
"A RESTORATIVE CHANCE."	2026	TBA	Aural Unicorns
"I'M YOUR FAVORITE!"	2026	TBA	Aural Unicorns

==== As featured artist ====
Title	Year	Album	Label
"Control"	2018	Aqua	Checkpoint
"Storm" (with SHSTR)	2018	Destroy the Creator	Nova Lotus
"Escape" (VIP)	2019	10 Years of Never Say Die Records	Never Say Die Records
"Oxygen" (with Evan Giia)	2024	Stamina	Self-released
"Dicc" (with Wreckno and UNIIQU3)	2024	Party Girl	Helix Records
"When I Talk!" (with Chuck Sutton)	2026	Dome of Doom 15 Year Anniversary Compilation	Dome of Doom Records

=== Guest appearances ===
As Moore Kismet

Title	Year	Album	Label
"Exoneration" (with Hollimon)	2019	All Nighter, Vol. 2	ArtbyFORM
"Your Soul" (with Midwxst)	2026	Solitude In Silence	Rebellion Records
"FutureHolds" (with Kasim Rizvi)	2026	InTune	Self-released

As Selfworth

Title	Year	Album	Label
"Dissolve"	2020	All Nighter, Vol. 5	ArtbyFORM
"Starfaced" (with Lunamatic and TYGKO)	2022	All Nighter, Vol. 7	ArtbyFORM
"In My Mind"	2023	Any%	ArtbyFORM
"Master of Disguise ! (Despite Everything)" (with Euphee, CadoFox and Disphing)	2023	Sleepover, Vol. 5: Lights Out!	Silkenwood

=== Remixes ===
Official remixes

Title	Year	Artist	Label
"404"	2018	Hekler and Gladez	Never Say Die Records
"Party With The Devil"	2018	GLD	Self-released
"Don't Let Me Fall"	2018	Asaa and Liam Ello	Esydia
"Full Speed"	2019	Nazaar	Hybrid Trap
"Crash"	2019	Too Kind	Self-released
"Run & Go" (feat. Shai Hicari)	2019	Dirty Audio	Thrive Music
"Black McLaren"	2019	MineSweepa	Self-released
"Time Is Running Out"	2019	Crimson Child and Timian	Self-released
"Zoom"	2019	Spag Heddy	Never Say Die Records
"Born To Survive" (feat. Rx Soul)	2019	Zomboy	Never Say Die Records
"Fading Out" (feat. Sara Skinner)	2019	ATLiens	Bassrush Records
"Crash & Burn" (feat. Northlane)	2020	PhaseOne	Disciple Records
"Heart Break" (feat. Karra)	2020	Moody Good and Slander	Gud Vibrations
"Slower"	2021	Tate McRae	RCA
"Blame Myself" (feat. Tori Kelly)	2022	Illenium	Warner Records
"Don't Look Back" (feat. Moelle)	2022	Kill the Noise	Ophelia Records
"Hold Up" (Moore Kismet Remix)	2022	Whipped Cream, Moore Kismet, Big Freedia, and Uniiqu3	Thrive Music
"All By Myself"	2022	Alok, Sigala and Ellie Goulding	Sony
"Loner"	2023	Alison Wonderland	Universal Music
"Horizon"	2023	Noisia and Skrillex	Vision
"Strings"	2023	Max, JVKE and Bazzi	Colour Vision / Warner
"The Same Bitch!"	2024	Sarah Defne Gray	RECORDS / Columbia Records
"The Laced Up Theory"	2024	Tsubi Club	Thrive Music
"Eye2eye"	2025	Tsu Nami	Pilot
"Reconnect"	2025	Virtual Riot	Monstercat / OWSLA

Unofficial remixes

Title	Year	Artist
"Crazy Love" (feat. Deb's Daughter)	2016	Audien
"My Way"	2016	Calvin Harris
"Can't Fight It"	2016	Quintino and Cheat Codes
"Supernatural" (feat. Anjulie)	2016	Boombox Cartel and Quix
"Life's a Bitch" (feat. AZ)	2016	Nas
"Goosebumps" (feat. Kendrick Lamar)	2017	Travis Scott
"One More Weekend"	2017	Audien and Max
"My Type" (feat. Emily Warren)	2017	The Chainsmokers
"Just Dawn Hue"	2017	Herobust
"Riot Call" (feat. Nevve)	2017	Quix
"Final Boss"	2017	Pixel Terror
"We Might Fall"	2017	Ghastly and Matthew Koma
"Hooked"	2017	Bonnie X Clyde
"Leaving You"	2017	Audien and M.Bronx
"Let Me Go"	2017	Wuki and PRXZM
"Bodak Yellow"	2017	Cardi B
"Favor"	2017	Vindata, Skrillex and Nstasia
"Parade"	2018	Vinai
"Against The World"	2018	Morgan Page and M.Bronx
"The Middle"	2018	Zedd, Maren Morris and Grey
"Sleep"	2018	Rickyxsan and Hydraulix
"Malfunction"	2018	ATLiens and Tynan
"Ghost Voices"	2018	Virtual Self
"Goodbye to a World" (Moore Kismet and Hollimon Reboot)	2018	Porter Robinson
"To Ü"	2019	Jack Ü and AlunaGeorge
"Ought"	2019	Sadkey
"Tokyo"	2019	Teriyaki Boyz
"Rise"	2020	Svdden Death
"Until I'm Home"	2021	Imagiro
"Animals"	2023	Martin Garrix
"Like A G6" (feat. The Cataracs and Dev)	2023	Far East Movement
"Ghost Voices" (Moore Kismet 2023 Reboot)	2023	Virtual Self
"Ratata"	2023	Skrillex, Missy Elliott and Mr. Oizo
"Just Dance"	2024	Lady Gaga
"Skylit"	2024	ISOxo and Fussy
"Lunch"	2024	Billie Eilish
"Andy"	2025	Skrillex
"Teen Titans Theme"	2026	Puffy AmiYumi
"Anybody"	2026	Skrillex and ISOxo
"Music"	2026	Underscores

=== Songwriting and production credits ===
Year	Title	Artist(s)	Album	Writer(s)	Producer(s)
2020	"Failsafe" (feat. Phixel and Khaki Cuffs)	Holidaykiss	Once and Future	Robyn Kim, Madison Lavin, Omar Davis	Holidaykiss, Moore Kismet
2021	"It Could Be Better"	Left at London	T.I.A.P.F.Y.H.	Nat Puff, Chromonicci, Moore Kismet	Left at London
2024	"Oxygen"	Evan Giia	Stamina	Evan Giarrusso, Ishaan Chaudhary, Stalking Gia, Will Curry	MEMBA, Moore Kismet
2024	"Dicc" (feat. Moore Kismet and Uniiqu3)	Wreckno	Party Girl	Brandon Wisniski, Omar Davis, Cherise Gary, Andrew Okamura	Wreckno, Moore Kismet, UNIIQU3, AOBeats
2024	"Glimpse"	WINK and Nikko	Seeing Double	Amir Schmuecker, Nikko Oskar, Omar Davis	WINK, Nikko, Moore Kismet
2025	"Glimpse"	Knoir	Non-album single	Jacob Rowe	Jacob Rowe, Darcy Hollins, Omar Davis
2026	"Don't Die"	Cedric Swan	Bunnyjungle	Cedric Swan, Moore Kismet	Cedric Swan, Moore Kismet
2026	"Feelin It"	Flyana Boss	Under The Influence	Bobbi LaNea Tyler, Folayan Kunerede, Mark Gozman, Omar Davis	Marky Style, Moore Kismet
2026	"Interlude"	Ghozt	Bautismo	Markus Cabrera, Avelina DeCandia Sayles, Omar Davis	Ghozt
2026	"New Year New Swag"	Midwxst	Solitude In Silence	Edgar N Sarratt III	Elxnce, Moore Kismet, 31sentinel
2026	"Your Soul" (feat. Moore Kismet)	Midwxst	Solitude In Silence	Edgar N Sarratt III, Moore Kismet	Elxnce, Lunamatic, Moore Kismet, 31sentinel, Scorpiioh
2026	"Bite"	Midwxst	Solitude In Silence	Edgar N Sarratt III	Elxnce, Moore Kismet
2026	"Know It All"	Midwxst	Solitude In Silence	Edgar N Sarratt III	Awe, Greyrock, Moore Kismet, San

== Filmography ==
=== Short films ===
Year	Title	Director	Writer	Producer	Editor
2026	The view is great!	Yes	Yes	Yes	Yes
