= Jersey club =

Genre of music from Newark, New Jersey

- Sample of a typical Jersey club beat, released in 2019
- Other names: Brick City club
- Stylistic origins: Baltimore club; Chicago house; hip-hop; breakbeat; bounce; juke; ghetto house; crunk; Miami bass
- Cultural origins: Late 1990s–Early 2000s, Newark, New Jersey, United States
- Typical instruments: Digital audio workstation; turntable; drum machine; sampler; sequencer
- Derivative forms: Deconstructed club; krushclub

Fusion genres
- Jersey club rap

Jersey club (originally called Brick City club) is a style of electronic club music that originated in Newark, New Jersey, in the late 90s/early 2000s. It was pioneered by DJ Tameil, Mike V, DJ Black Mic, and DJ Tim Dolla of the Brick Bandits crew, who were inspired by Baltimore club's uptempo hybrid of house and hip-hop. Subsequent young producers pushed for the progression of the style in the late 2000s, bringing it to global audiences.

Similarly to its Baltimore influences, Jersey club is an aggressive style defined by its fast, "bouncy" groove at tempos near 130–140 BPM, but more prominent use of staccato, chopped samples and heavy tresillo or shuffled triplet kick patterns. The style often consists of remixes of rap and R&B tracks. It is often accompanied by frenetic, competitive dances which have gained global popularity through viral videos.

== Style and characteristics ==
Jersey club has been described as a "fast and aggressive dance music" with roots in the Baltimore club scene's fusion of house music and hip-hop. By comparison with the Baltimore style, Jersey producers prioritize harder kick sounds and more extensively chopped samples. The distinctive "bounciness" of the style is a result of its triplet percussive pattern, often credited to Tapp's "Dikkontrol." 808 bass sounds and sampled breakbeats from Lyn Collins' "Think (About It)" are commonly employed, as well as varied pop culture references. Common audio programs used are Sony Acid Pro and FL Studio.

Producers make use of "big kick drum triplets and vocal clips that call out dances, or chopped samples from top rap and R&B tracks," and construct the tracks on "anything from jog shuttle MP3 controllers to turntables and Serato." Brick Bandits member Dirty South Joe noted that "vocals are chopped, fragmented and layered over heavy bass kicks to deconstruct the source material, and rework it for the dance floor." He called it "aggressive, yet melodic and sexy." Billboard described it as "repetitive and loud [..] It lands somewhere between New York's vogue and Chicago's juke with a little bit of that nasty from Miami bass." DJ Sliink summarized it as "a more urban take to dance music with chopped vocals and breaks."

== History ==
=== Origins: 1999–2002 ===
Club or house music has a long history in Newark, home to the older New Jersey sound electronic genre. Chicago house was popular in Newark's 1990s club scene, where it was referred to generically by some as "club music." Other styles such as urban club and juke were also played. By 1999, Baltimore house records such as Tapp's "Shake Dat Ass" and "Dikkontrol" were influential, and DJs such as Nix In The Mix, Mustafah, Torry T and Mista Quietman helped to introduce this sound to New Jersey. DJ Tameil, who became known for his Chicago house mixtapes as a teenager, later established connections with the Baltimore scene; he was subsequently introduced to Baltimore stars such as DJ Technics and Rod Lee. Tameil did not put artist names on his mixes, making it difficult for other Jersey producers to identify his sources. He began playing Baltimore records at teen parties and clubs in the downtown Newark area.

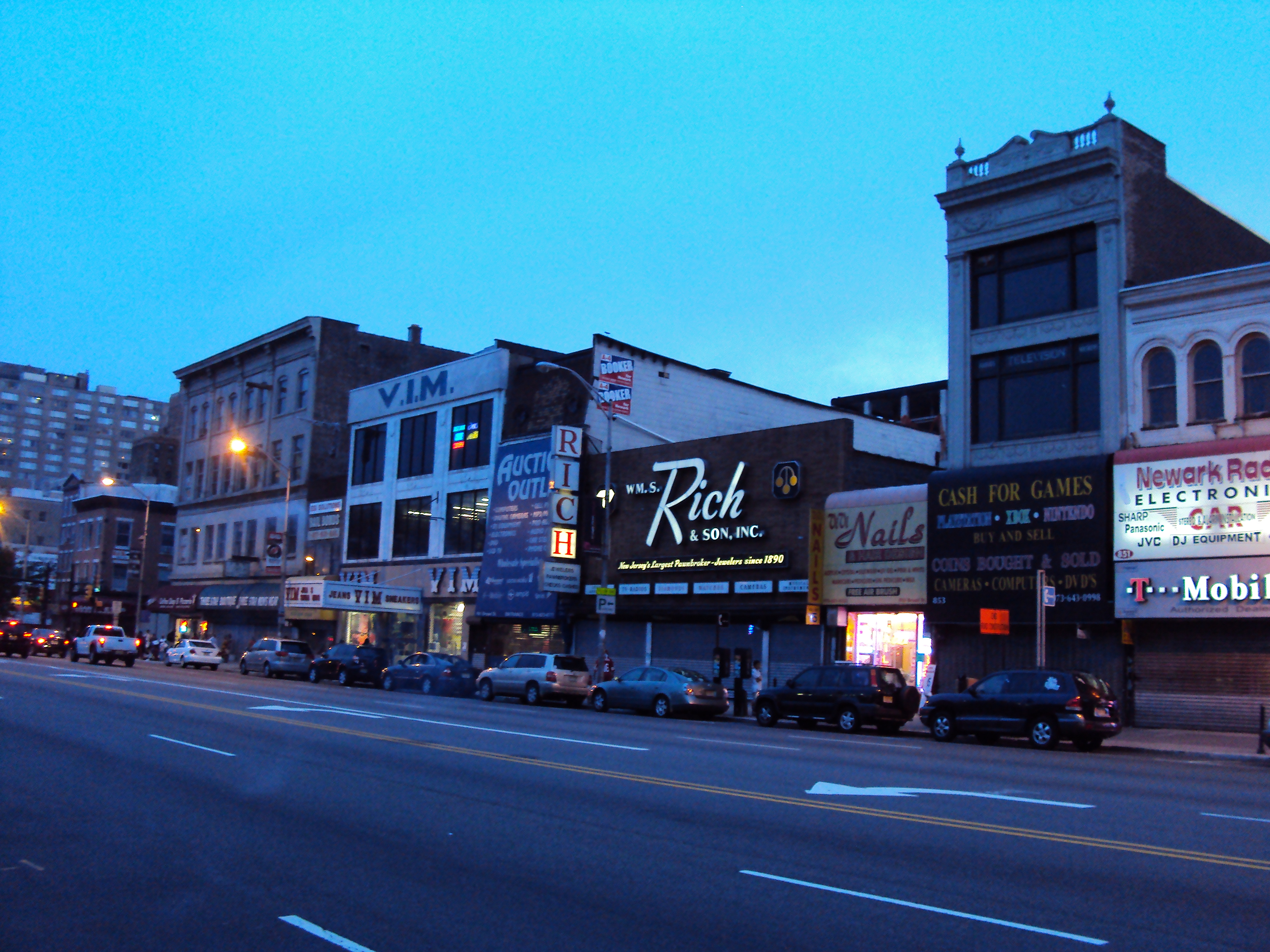
Broad Street in downtown Newark, where DJ Tameil sold his burned CDs.

Tameil was among the first Jersey artists to produce his own club tracks in 2001 with the Dat Butt EP, released on his own label Anthrax Records. A week later the Newark group The OG's also self-released an EP titled Official Ghetto Style. Tameil began to burn his own CDs and sold them on Broad Street in Newark. Around this time, DJs Tim Dolla and Mike V also began producing their own club tracks as the Brick Bandits to challenge Tameil's monopoly on the market. The two parties initially feuded but Tameil later joined the group, coining the phrase "Brick City club" in 2002 in reference to Newark's nickname "Brick City." They released popular mixtapes which featured both club and house tracks. Club parties, hosted primarily in ballrooms and banquet halls, began emerging in Newark and surrounding suburbs such as East Orange and Irvington. Despite violence in the city, parties thrown by the Brick Bandits or at the Branch Brook Skating Rink were known to be safe spaces for kids.

=== Regional development: 2003–2009 ===
Many young Newark producers soon began leaving for college or employment, causing there to be a temporary drought of producers around 2003 but spreading the style to other locations. Meanwhile, Tameil, Dolla, and Mike V were utilizing Sony Acid Pro, a digital audio workstation that remains popular with Jersey club producers, to create music and support themselves. Around 2005, a younger generation began to emerge alongside these older producers, with groups like the Partyhoppers of Elizabeth, New Jersey, initially dissing and then joining the Brick Bandits. Around this time, the name of the genre changed to "Jersey club" to account for its spread beyond Newark, as increasingly popularity on college campuses and the success of Baltimore club raised the scene's profile on the Internet, particularly through Myspace.

Around this time, the Jersey style drifted away from the Baltimore template and its palette became more distinctive as younger producer-DJs such as Nadus, Sliink, Jayhood, and R3LL began receiving recognition. R3LL, then a high school student, became known as a promoter of parties and later spread the music to college campuses in North Jersey.

Celebby (Celeb) also emerged as a staple in the jersey club sound in 2007. Celebby used her originality to create the first original jersey club sample pack as a vocalist. She created and recorded her own viral vocals such as "Did this nigga just grab my butt?...", "my butt too fat", "ooh", and "make it jump". Many Djs and producers across New Jersey began to incorporate her vocals in their jersey club records. Cementing her as "The Voice" of Jersey Club.

Later that year, Philadelphia began developing its own club scene influenced by the Jersey style. Around 2008, the genre began receiving airplay on major rap and R&B stations like Hot 97 and Power 105. 2008 also gave birth to the first rapping on club beats when Newark's Unicorn151 collaborated with Baltimore's DJ K-Swift via Myspace for the song "Tote It Remix". By 2009, it had spread to 21+ clubs and new, older demographics. Around this time, the scene shifted toward competitive dancing and battling became a central element inspired by DJ Fresh's "Get Silly," along with MCing by figures such as Lil Man. Tim Dolla produced a hit track called "Swing Dat" in reference to the popular dance move, and subsequent dance tracks like DJ Fresh's "Go Silly" and Jayhood's "Patty Cake" and DJ Tone Dafire Marshal's "She Gotta Donkey" & "Get Downtown" went viral via YouTube.

DJ Saucy P produced “Make it Jump” utilizing Celebby’s voice as the foundation to the track. As this song begin to gain traction, several DJs, including Dj Sharphands added their spin on the record. DJ Frosty later added his vocals to “Make it Jump” thus creating “Ride that wave”. This particular version hit the scene with enormous momentum which gained major traction on the internet and radio stations including Hot 97 . The song went on to feature Fatman Scoop, Dj Webstar, Young B, & others.

=== International attention: 2010–2019 ===
By 2010, electronic music artists from other scenes were drawing influence from the Jersey club sound, including Norwegian producers Cashmere Cat and Lido; LA club producers; "festival trap" and EDM producers with the support of Mad Decent and Skrillex; and dance artists such as Brenmar and the Night Slugs label roster. Concerns about appropriation of the style have become prevalent, with privileged outsiders coopting the sound to get bookings. R&B singer Ciara, in her comeback single "Level Up," uses a beat structure that is similar to that which is used in Jersey club.

For DJ Khaled's single "To the Max", DJ Jayhood even claims that DJ Khaled was inspired by his Jersey club single "HeartBroken". Jersey club also played an essential role during the early and mid-2010s in the development of experimental dance genres, such as deconstructed club. Jersey club became an integral fixture of the alternative NYC party scene and was played at underground parties such as GHE20G0TH1K which served to be essential to the developing sound of deconstructed club music.

The style and its direct derivatives have become known on the internet due to music sharing websites and social media such as SoundCloud, YouTube, Vine and Dubsmash across the United States, Australia, New Zealand, and Europe. Meanwhile, native Jersey DJs such as Uniiqu3 and DJ Sliink have taken the sound to international audiences, and rave-like parties such as DJ Nadus's #THREAD and Uniiqu3's #135 have incorporated more eclectic formats of club music. When Uniiqu3 began DJing in 2009 at age 18, she was likely the only female DJ in the scene; today, other female producers such as Kayy Drizz and So Dellirious are also present. In December 2014, Newark hosted the Jersey Club awards to honor artists from the scene. In 2019, Uniiqu3 began the PBNJ party series bringing together club artists from Philadelphia, Baltimore, and New Jersey.

In 2019, Jersey club artist Unicorn151 aka Killa Kherk Cobain's song "It's Time" shifted the Jersey club sound into the hip-hop mainstream after being debuted at the 2019 Summer Jam Concert by Hot 97's DJ Enuff. Unicorn151 aka Killa Kherk Cobain is credited as the first to person to rap on a Jersey club record after rapping on his 2007 collaboration with the late DJ K-Swift, "Tote It Remix". Spin Magazine described Unicorn151 (Killa Kherk Cobain's) fusion of trap rap, house music, and Jersey club as "the less innocent side of the Jersey club scene". Unicorn151 and his producer DJ Fade (a collective known as "Jersey Gods") have since lent their unique fusion of jersey club and hip-hop production to mainstream recording artists, including Pop Smoke, Fivio Foreign, Chris Brown, and Swizz Beats.

=== TikTok and international adoption: 2020–present ===
Jersey club artist Cookiee Kawaii's song "Vibe" was a 2020 viral sensation, sparking worldwide fanfare on the social media app TikTok.

In September 2021, Jersey club producer and DJ Uniiqu3 had her breakthrough single "Microdosing" used to Soundtrack Versace x Fendi "Fendaci" catwalk collection.

In 2022, Drake released his seventh studio album Honestly, Nevermind which contains the song "Currents", which was heavily influenced by Jersey club music and features the characteristic "Some Cut" bed squeak sample. The track "Sticky" uses the Baltimore Club five beat bass drum pattern.

In 2022, Lil Uzi Vert released the Jersey Club song "Just Wanna Rock" which gained virality on social media, including TikTok and Twitter and peaked at number 10 on the Billboard Hot 100. This led to a new level of popularity for the genre in the early months of 2023, including the Jersey Club inspired single by PinkPantheress and Ice Spice "Boy's a Liar Pt. 2" reaching number 3 on both the Billboard Hot 100 and the Billboard Global 200 in April. In December 2025, Lil Uzi Vert released the Jersey Club song "What You Saying", which peaked at number 12 on the Billboard Hot 100 in the following January and reached number 1 on the Billboard Rhythmic Airplay chart in March.

== Jersey club rap ==
Jersey club rap
- Other names: Jersey club drill; Jersey drill
- Stylistic origins: Drill music; Jersey club
- Cultural origins: late 2010s, New Jersey

Jersey club rap is a fusion genre of hip-hop and Jersey club music.

The years between 2018 and 2020 were pivotal to the resurgence in popularity of Jersey club music as, for the first time ever, Jersey artists (rappers and singers) began making original rap songs using Jersey club-styled beats. East Orange rapper Unicorn151 aka Killa Kherk Cobain, Irvington singer Cookiee Kawaii, and Newark producer/DJ/artist Uniiqu3 began to format Jersey club-styled beats into song format using their own vocals and lyrics for verses, hooks, and bridges. Morphing Jersey Club into this sample-free, lyric infused song format now allowed radio stations like Hot 97, Z100, Power 105.1, and SiriusXM to play these records in regular rotation with Hip-Hop, R&B, Top 40, etc. This allowed Jersey Club music to gain a much wider audience. Where Jersey Club music was originally pioneered, produced, and created by the producers and the DJ's, the years 2018 - 2020 saw the emergence of the first ever Jersey Club "Artists". Unicorn151 aka Killa Kherk Cobain, Cookiee Kawaii, Uniiqu3, Chad B and DJ Jay Hood fall into this new category of Jersey Club Artists.

Unicorn151 aka Killa Kherk Cobain alongside producers Ace Mula and DJ Fade began experimenting with a new sound for Jersey Club music in 2018. While much of the Jersey Club music being created catered to dancers and children, Unicorn151, Ace Mula, and DJ Fade began producing songs that catered to their gangsta rap fans. Simultaneously in neighboring Brooklyn, New York, the Brooklyn drill sound of Pop Smoke, Fivio Foreign, and 22Gz was also becoming a worldwide phenomena, which naturally trickled its influence and sound to the neighboring boroughs of NYC and nearby New Jersey. DJ Fade and Unicorn, through mutual friends at the radio stations, were able to collaborate with these Brooklyn drill rappers to produce Jersey Club remixes for many popular Brooklyn drill artists. While the DJ Fade and Unicorn duo, known as Jersey Gods, were the first to fuse both sounds, these songs were not yet considered Jersey Drill, but rather Jersey Club mixes of Brooklyn drill and UK drill.

In 2019 Ace Mula was commissioned to produce Jersey Club beats for Unicorn151 aka Killa Kherk Cobain to rap over. Ace Mula's beats were specifically tailored for trap, drill, and Gangsta rap, which allowed Unicorn151 to maintain his natural rap cadence, while the beats switched between trap, drill, and Jersey club beats throughout the songs. This specific usage of Brooklyn drill inspired production on top of Jersey club beat patterns gave each record a distinct sound that could easily be identified as having origins in New Jersey. These newfound Jersey club rap records inspired many rappers in Newark and the surrounding areas to embrace their homegrown sound and begin rapping on beats infused with Unicorn151 and Ace Mula's signature Jersey club sound.

In 2020, PBS Soundfield visited Newark for a documentary to interview Uniiqu3, Unicorn151 aka Killa Kherk Cobain, DJ Fade, and DJ Tameil for an in-depth segment detailing the newest evolutions of Jersey Club music and this new generation of Jersey Club Artists.

In 2021, Newark-based Jersey club rapper Bandmanrill released a reel via Instagram and TikTok where he joked about rapping drill lyrics over a Jersey club beat. The skit went viral as fans took an immediate liking to Bandmanrill's drill-like flow, cadence, and lyrics over the Jersey Club beat. Bandmanrill went on to turn his skit into the full length single and video titled "HeartBroken" produced by Newark producer McVertt. This sparked a widespread social media debate on platforms like TikTok, Instagram, and Facebook as to what this new sound should be called or titled. Jersey Drill or Jersey Club Drill?

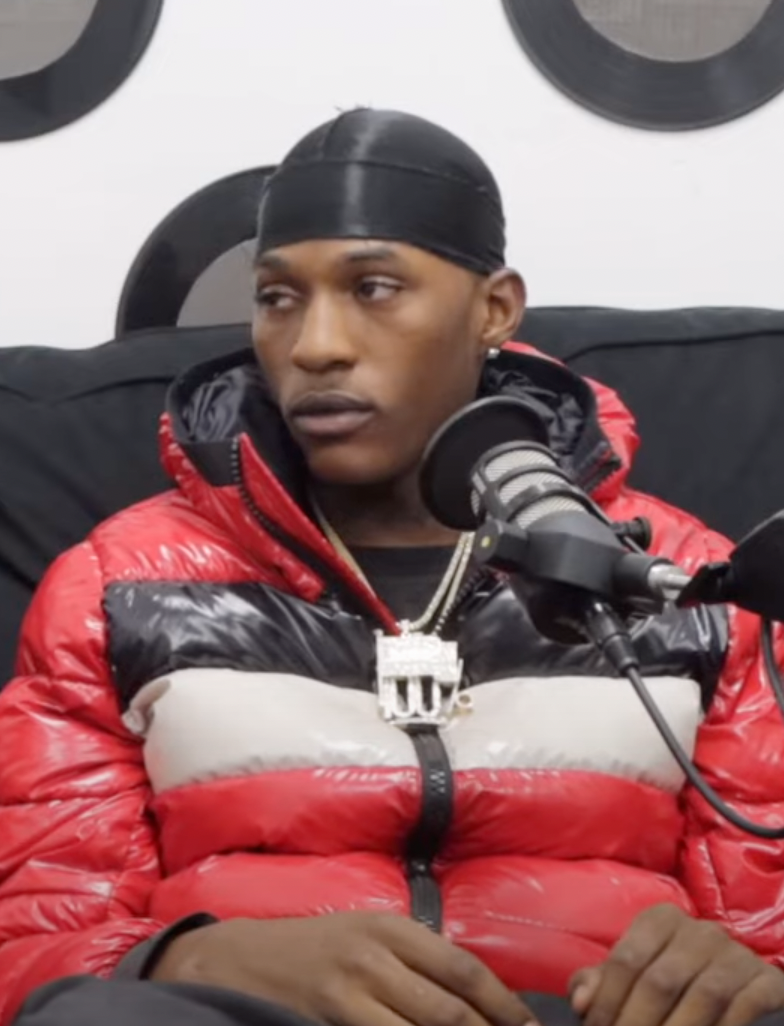
Jersey club artist Bandmanrill

In 2021, Unicorn151 aka Killa Kherk Cobain, Bandmanrill, and Ace Mula released the first official Jersey Drill song and music video titled "Jack N Drill". Together they solidified and jump-started the Jersey Drill movement by collaborating on the "Jack N Drill" single, which was followed by a drill-style music video signifying that this sound is officially the "Jersey Drill" sound. The title "Jack N Drill" is a triple-entendre play on words. "Jackin'" is street slang for stealing or robbing. Newark, New Jersey, is historically notorious for "carjackin'", so it can humorously be said that New Jersey is "jackin'", or forcefully taking, the drill sound from the UK and Brooklyn. "Jackin'" is also street slang in NYC for "claiming something with pride". Many NYC drill artists tout that they are "jackin'" a certain gang affiliation. Thus, "Jack N Drill" can also be interpreted that New Jersey is pridefully claiming the drill sound as their own sub-genre. "Jack N Drill" also plays off of the story "Jack and Jill", which can be interpreted that New Jersey and Brooklyn Drill see themselves as partners overcoming the same obstacles and working towards the same goal.

Popular New Jersey drill artists include Unicorn151 aka Killa Kherk Cobain, MBM Franko, Bandmanrill, Ib Mattic, Daidough, and Baby ATM.

== Dance culture and Newark street-dance lineage ==
Dance has been an important component of Jersey club culture since the genre’s early development in Newark, New Jersey. While the musical style developed from Baltimore club and Newark’s existing house and club-music scene, a related movement culture developed through house parties, skating rinks, school events, dance battles and organized street-dance crews.

Jersey club developed in Newark around the turn of the 21st century and was originally known as “Brick City Club”, after Newark’s nickname. DJ Tameil is widely credited as one of the principal pioneers of the sound, alongside producers including Tim Dolla, Mike V and DJ Black Mic and the wider Brick Bandits collective. Contemporary accounts trace the style to Baltimore club, which Newark DJs adapted into a local form characterized by rapid tempos, triplet kick patterns, chopped samples and frequent rhythmic breaks.

=== Early Newark dance culture ===
Social dancing in Newark predates Jersey club as a musical genre. Dance Mogul Magazine’s oral-history project on New Jersey street dance describes a local lineage extending through house and club culture of the 1970s and 1980s and Newark house parties of the 1990s. Social dances associated with Newark parties included movements known as “Lock It Up”, also called the “Stolen Car”, and the “Wall”. Other dances including the “Percolator”, “One Leg Get Back” and “Rock Ya Hips” subsequently became associated with the broader Jersey club dance vocabulary.

The development of Jersey club dance differed from the documentation of its music. Whereas recordings, mixtapes and production credits provide records of the musical genre’s development, many dances circulated informally between participants at parties, skating rinks and battles before widespread online video sharing.

Branch Brook Park Roller Skating Center became an important gathering place for the developing culture. In 2025, the New Jersey Historical Commission approved “BBPSR: Birthplace of the Jersey Club Movement” in Newark as a site on the New Jersey Black Heritage Trail.

=== Brick City Dancers ===
Dance Mogul Magazine identifies the Brick City Dancers as an important Newark street-dance group active during the 1990s and as part of the local dance lineage that preceded the emergence of Jersey club as a named musical genre.

According to the magazine’s oral history, the group included dancers Major, NyJohn, Mark, Faheem and Shaheed and worked under the guidance of Basil Harris and Barbara Ramirez. The group performed choreographed street dance at Newark talent shows and venues including Newark Symphony Hall and the New Jersey Performing Arts Center (NJPAC), representing a transition of local social and street dancing from parties and informal gatherings to organized stage performance.

Dance Mogul’s account describes the Brick City Dancers as a bridge between Newark’s earlier street-dance culture and the generation of dance crews that emerged during the development of Jersey club in the early 2000s.

=== EnVy Dance Group ===
EnVy Dance Group formed in Newark in 2003 during the early development of Jersey club. Dance Mogul Magazine identifies the original members as Jerryl “Butta”, Anthony “Solo” Harris, Maurice “Mo Chedda”, Quason “Swift”, Chris “Hitman”, Ayman “Ice” and Zachary “Ziplock”.

The group’s movement incorporated Jersey club party dances alongside freestyle, choreography, popping, locking, house dance and footwork. EnVy performed during a period when Jersey club culture was spreading through skating rinks, battles, stage performances, DVDs, websites and other forms of video circulation before social-media video platforms became dominant.

Anthony “Solo” Harris, a member of EnVy, has subsequently been recognized by the New Jersey Performing Arts Center as a member of the Newark group and as an instructor whose work helped cultivate the Jersey club dance style. NJPAC again identified Harris in its 2026 Ailey Day programming as a member of EnVy, which it described as having been established in Newark in 2003 and having helped cultivate Jersey club dance.

=== Relationship between the music and dance ===
Jersey club dance developed in close interaction with the music. DJs frequently used repeated vocal commands, rhythmic breaks and abrupt changes that encouraged dancers to respond to individual sections of a track. Dance battles and social dancing consequently became part of the culture surrounding the music.

Dance Mogul Magazine distinguishes the history of Jersey club music from the history of its dance culture, arguing that the two developed together but were preserved differently. Producers left recordings and production credits, while dance movements were often transmitted directly between dancers and modified through freestyle participation.

Before the widespread adoption of YouTube and social media, Jersey club dance footage circulated through VHS recordings, DVDs, early websites and direct sharing. Dance Mogul’s archive identifies Urbanvision.net and the ‘‘Da Sample’’ video project among the early channels through which footage of New Jersey dance crews circulated.

By the 2010s and 2020s, social media substantially expanded the audience for both Jersey club music and its associated dances. Earlier elements of the culture—including short musical phrases, call-and-response structures, recognizable dances and competitive improvisation—were well suited to short-form online video.

=== Historical recognition ===
In 2025, the New Jersey Historical Commission added “BBPSR: Birthplace of the Jersey Club Movement” in Newark to the state’s Black Heritage Trail. The designation formally recognizes Newark as a significant location in the development of Jersey club culture and Branch Brook Park Roller Skating Center as a historic site associated with the movement.

The recognition reflects the broader role of physical gathering places in Jersey club’s development. Newark skating rinks, ballrooms, house parties and performance venues provided spaces where DJs, producers and dancers interacted during the genre’s formative period.

The 2016 Running Man Challenge, a viral meme in which participants filmed and shared short clips of themselves performing a dance resembling running to the 1996 song "My Boo," was based on well-known Jersey club moves. The original videos were posted on Vine by high school students in Newark-adjacent Hillside.

== Official Historical Recognition ==
In October 2025 an official historical marker for Jersey Club music was approved by the State of New Jersey at the Branch Brook Park Roller Skating Rink in Newark, NJ. This historical marker recognizes the genre's origins and honors two of Jersey Club Music's pioneers: DJ Tameil and Unicorn151, for their contributions to the genre's development and globalization. This historical marker for Jersey Club Music is the first location site of a Black Heritage Trail for Jersey Club Music in Newark, that will highlight areas of historical significance to the Jersey Club culture and beginnings. Pending sites along the Black Heritage Trail include Terrace Ballroom at Newark Symphony Hall (where street team's were birthed and high school Jersey Club events took place from the late 1990's to early 2000's), the intersection Broad & Market Street in Newark's Downtown District (home to DJ Tameil's 1st CD stand where Brick Bandit mixtapes were sold), Club Zanzibar (home to house music legends like Tony Humphries and birthplace to the original Jersey sound that birthed Jersey Club), and World Cup Corner (A cultural landmark, mural, and art activation representing Jersey Club's current global impact in celebration of FIFA World Cup 2026 being hosted in New Jersey).

== See also ==
- Baltimore club
- Deconstructed club
- New Jersey sound (1980s era house music with influences from Newark gospel and dance music)
- North to Shore Festival (Newark music festival)
- James Moody Jazz Festival (Newark music festival)
- Halsey Street (independent small-scale entertainment and retail strip in Newark)
