= Uniiqu3 =

American DJ, musician and music producer

UNIIQU3
- Birth name: Cherise Alexandria Gary
- Origin: Hillside, New Jersey, U.S.
- Genres: Jersey club, house
- Occupation: DJ, Music Producer
- Years active: 2011–present
- Labels: NLV Records, Club Queen, Ultra Records

Cherise Alexandria Gary, known by her stage name UNIIQU3 (stylized in all caps), is an American DJ, songwriter, and music producer.

UNIIQU3 is best known for her work in the Jersey club genre, most notably her 2018 song with TT the Artist "Girls Off the Chain," which was sampled for Chloe Bailey's 2022 debut single, "Have Mercy". She has been dubbed the "Queen of Jersey Club."

She has made official remixes for Tiwa Savage, Crystal Waters, Aluna George, Anna Lunoe, and more. She is signed to Nina Las Vegas record label NLV Records and hosts her own radio show on SiriusXM called Club Queen Radio.

== Early life ==
Gary was raised in Hillside, New Jersey. She first discovered Jersey club as a teenage ballerina at Newark Symphony Hall. DJ Tameil, the founding father of Jersey club, was selling his CDs at a booth nearby, which she would purchase and share with her peers. In time, she noticed the lack of female DJ representation in Newark's club scene, so she learned how to DJ in 2011, and two years later, she began producing.

== Career ==
Starting in 2014, UNIIQU3 released a series of mixtapes. Her popularity grew through her 2016 Boiler Room appearance, her 2017 mix for 'Diplo and Friends' radio show on BBC Radio 1XTRA, and with the 2021 release of her Heartbeats EP which contained the viral song "Microdosing", landing on Billboard Magazine's "Best Dance Songs of 2021" list. In 2022, she collaborated with Whipped Cream, Big Freedia, and Moore Kismet on the single "Hold Up."

In September 2021, her breakthrough single "Microdosing" was used to soundtrack the Versace x Fendi "Fendaci" catwalk collection. In 2023, Uniiqu3 won a BMI award for her contribution to Chloe Bailey's debut song "Have Mercy". Most recently, she was profiled by PBS in a short documentary on the origins, rise to prominence, and ongoing contributions Jersey club artists are making to global urban music and dance cultures.

In 2019, UNIIQU3 began the ongoing PBNJ party series bringing together club artists from Philadelphia, Baltimore, and New Jersey. UNIIQU3 performed as supporting act on the East Coast leg of Tinashe's BB/Ang3l tour, taking place in 2024.

== Discography ==
=== Extended plays ===
- Phase 3 (2018)
- Club Queens [with TT the Artist] (2018)
- Digital Diva (2020)
- Digital Diva Vol. 2 (2020)
- Heartbeats (2021)

=== Remix Albums ===
- #itsUNIIQU3 CRATE (Edits & Remixes) (2018)

=== Mixtapes ===
- The New Klassiks (2014)
- Bitches is Outside Vol. 1 (2021)

=== Singles ===
- "Tic Tac" feat. Lambo (2016)
- "Trunk" (2017)
- "Like Me" (2017)
- "Phase 3" (2018)
- "Girls Off the Chain" [with TT the Artist] (2018)
- "Bubblegum" (2018)
- "How Bout This" (2019)
- "LSD" (2019)
- "Breakin' Necks" (2019)
- "7 Day Weekends" (2020)
- "Rave in My Room" (2020)
- "Microdosing" (2021)
- "Unavailable" (2021)
- "Jersey Club Movie" (2023)
- "Body Moves" [with The Glitch Mob and Samurai Breaks] (2023)
- "Shake The Room" with Dos Flakos (2023)

=== Remix songs ===
- 2021: Tiwa Savage - "The Way You Are (Gbadun You) (Uniiqu3 Remix)"
- 2021: Aluna - "Body Pump (Uniiqu3 Remix)"
- 2023: Crystal Waters – "100% Pure Love (Uniiqu3 Remix)"

== See also ==
- Jersey club
