= The Paradox =

Closed dance club in South Baltimore, Maryland, US

Coordinates: 39°16′35″N 76°37′33″W

The Paradox was a South Baltimore dance club from 1991 to 2016. It was originally a home to house music, but later on got more of a hip hop feel. The club was founded by Wayne Davis.

== History ==
The Paradox was an important gathering place for Baltimore's DJs, producers, and dance music fans. The sound system was developed, designed, and installed by Richard Long of Richard Long & Associates (RLA) and Dave Soto. The club marked important events in the careers of many notable Djs such as Angel X and Promoters in the Baltimore Club Music scene such as K-Swift, Scott Henry, Leroy Burgess Jr., Scottie B and Charles Feelgood.

The Paradox closed its doors permanently in 2016, following a social media announcement by club owner Wayne Davis in October 2015. This news came less than five years after a full renovation of the club, which aimed to draw larger crowds. Despite its apparent success and popularity within the community, the Paradox struggled to make a profit in its later years, particularly due to the fact they did not sell alcohol. The location which the Paradox occupied was initially to be taken over by Hammerjack's, another long-standing hallmark of Baltimore's music scene—although notably less focused on the club music the city is known for. As of 2020, the new Hammerjacks incarnation has yet to open.
