= Baltimore club =

Genre of house and dance music

- Other names: Bmore club; Bmore house; Bmore
- Stylistic origins: Hip hop; breakbeat; ghetto house; Miami bass; house; techno
- Cultural origins: Early 1990s, Baltimore, Maryland, U.S.
- Derivative forms: Jersey club; Philly club

Other topics
- Ghettotech; Chicago house; electroclash; dirty rap

Baltimore club, also called B'more club, B'more house or simply B'more, is a music genre that fuses breakbeat and house. It was created in Baltimore in the early 1990s by Frank Ski, Scottie B, Shawn Caesar, DJ Technics, DJ Class, DJ Patrick, Kenny B, among others.

Baltimore club is based on an 8/4 beat structure, and includes tempos around 130 beats per minute. It combines repetitive, looped vocal snippets similar to trap, bounce, ghetto house and ghettotech. The instrumental tracks include heavy breakbeats and call and response stanzas similar to those found in the go-go music of neighboring city Washington, D.C. The most prominent breakbeats sampled include "Sing Sing" by disco band "Gaz" and "Think (About It)" by Lyn Collins.

== History ==
=== Origins ===
Early promoters of Baltimore club included Scottie B and his colleagues at Unruly Records.

The Ensoniq ASR-10 keyboard sampler, released in 1992, was used to produce many tracks in the genre.

=== 2000s ===
In the mid-2000s, the genre gained crossover popularity in Baltimore's rock underground due to dance nights at venues such as the Talking Head Club. Baltimore club was featured in Spin Magazine in December 2005.

Rod Lee was described as "the original don of Baltimore club" by The Washington Post in 2005.

DJ K-Swift was known as a prominent personality in the genre. In addition to DJing at "Hammerjacks" and The Paradox, she hosted a radio show on WERQ-FM from 1998 until her death in 2008.

=== 2010s ===
In 2019, James Nasty club track "Pop!" was featured in Season 5, episode 4 of the Comedy Central series Broad City.

=== 2020s ===
Dark City Beneath the Beat, a documentary featuring Baltimore club music, was released on streaming platforms in August 2020.

In 2023, June 17 was declared Baltimore Club Music Day by mayor Brandon Scott. A ceremony recognizing club music pioneers was held at Baltimore's annual AFRAM celebration.

== Offshoots ==
In the 1990s, Baltimore club music developed a cult following in the North Jersey club scene, particularly in the Jersey club genre of Newark, New Jersey developed by DJ Tameil. This spread stemmed from the distribution of mix tapes by traveling Baltimore DJs. There were also many Boston-area radio shows in the mid-1990s that played Baltimore club music. It also spread south to the Virginia club scene and to Alabama where DJ Seven, formerly known as DJ Taj, developed Bamabounce. It had also started to spread to New York City.

Philadelphia and Jersey club music are both subgenres of Baltimore club music, but each evolved separately. As background noises in Baltimore club music increased in popularity, they spread into Philadelphia, where the genre locally developed into what is called Philly club, otherwise referred to "party music." This style is much faster than Baltimore club music and includes elements of hardstyle such as sirens. In contrast, Baltimore club music spread into New Jersey in an entirely different manner. New Jersey DJs, most notably DJ Tameil and Tim Dolla, were taking runs to Baltimore to pick up the latest club records and bring them back to New Jersey to play at parties. The sounds began to mutate with what local DJs and producers added on and changed. This style became known as Jersey club, which smoothed out the rugged, raw, and violent edges of Baltimore club music.

== Baltimore club dance ==
Baltimore club dance became very popular with Baltimore's African-American community. Throughout the city, dance crews battled against each other at recreation centers and nightclubs, and music from famous disc jockeys was at its peak. These dance moves, created from Baltimore club music, were usually high-paced and intense because Baltimore club music evolved from house music and hip hop, two fast-paced music genres.

One move born out of Baltimore club music is the "crazy legs", a shaking of both legs with simultaneous foot tapping and shoulder shrugging. Another dance move that evolved out of Baltimore club music was the “what what”, involving footwork where one raises up one bent leg over the other, in a fast, hopping-like movement. A video featuring girls wearing face coverings while doing versions of the "crazy legs" and the "what what" to a remix of Miss Tony's "How You Wanna Carry It" entitled "Put Your Mask On" went viral in April 2020.

During its peak, Baltimore club DJs received international recognition and were featured on the records of major artists. International recognition given to Baltimore club music and dance was short-lived. Many attribute the downfall of Baltimore club culture to the radio, as new tracks could be listened to without going to the club. The decrease in popularity of Baltimore club culture can also be attributed to the closing of major Baltimore clubs, such as Paradox and Hammerjacks.
