= Transgender Street Legend, Vol. 2 =

EP by Left at London
- Released: September 25, 2020
- Recorded: Nat Puff's home in Seattle, Washington; Los Angeles, California
- Genres: Bedroom pop; R&B; chillwave; lo-fi; indie folk
- Length: 19:19
- Label: Self-released
- Producers: Dylan Brady; Nat Puff

Left at London chronology
This One's For the Milfs (2020)	Transgender Street Legend, Vol. 2 (2020)	T.I.A.P.F.Y.H. (2021)

Singles from Transgender Street Legend, Vol. 2
- 1. "6 Feet" Released: December 3, 2019; 2. "Do You See Us?" Released: July 20, 2020; 3. "Safety First" Released: August 28, 2020; 4. "T-Shirt" Released: September 9, 2020

Transgender Street Legend, Vol. 2 is the eighth extended play (and fifth wide-release) by American singer-songwriter and producer Left at London, released on September 25, 2020. The EP was promoted by the singles "6 Feet", "Do You See Us?", "Safety First", and "T-Shirt". It is the sequel to her EP Transgender Street Legend, Vol. 1, which was released in November 2018 to "a rousing reception". The title Transgender Street Legend is a reference to a video on the social media platform Vine, where Puff achieved much of her early notoriety. The third and final EP in the Transgender Street Legend trilogy was released on June 24, 2022.

== Music ==
Puff called the EP "strictly bedroom pop" as the entire album was self-produced in her own home, aside from "6 Feet" which was recorded by Dylan Brady in Los Angeles, California. Much of the EP was recorded during lockdown, which Puff said "has been a detriment to many people's mental health, my own included, but goddamn it if I haven't been making some bops here and there!" The song "T-Shirt" was written by Puff pre-transition while still in high school.

"Do You See Us?" previously appeared on her two-track EP Jenny Durkan, Resign in Disgrace. The track is a "call-out" to Seattle mayor Jenny Durkan, who Puff "holds responsible for condoning police violence and causing 'the citizens of a historically gay neighborhood to be gassed on the first day of Pride Month'". The track also pays tribute to Summer Taylor and Cherleena Lyles, two people murdered by Seattle police. "Safety First" is described as "thoroughly bedroom pop, with stylistic nods to mid-2000s indie rock like Beck and The Strokes seen through a more contemporary lo-fi lens".

== Track listing ==
Credits adapted from Tidal.

No.	Title	Writer(s)	Length
1.	"Do You See Us?" (featuring Nobi)	Nat Puff; Marquise Green	2:40
2.	"6 Feet"	Puff; Dylan Brady	2:36
3.	"Choke"	Puff	3:07
4.	"Safety First" (featuring Vera Much)	Puff; Vera Yarmo-Gray	4:06
5.	"T-Shirt"	Puff	3:08
6.	"My Friends Are Kinda Strange" (featuring Chuck Sutton)	Puff; Chuck Sutton	3:42
Total length:			19:19
