= Defiant Records =

American record label

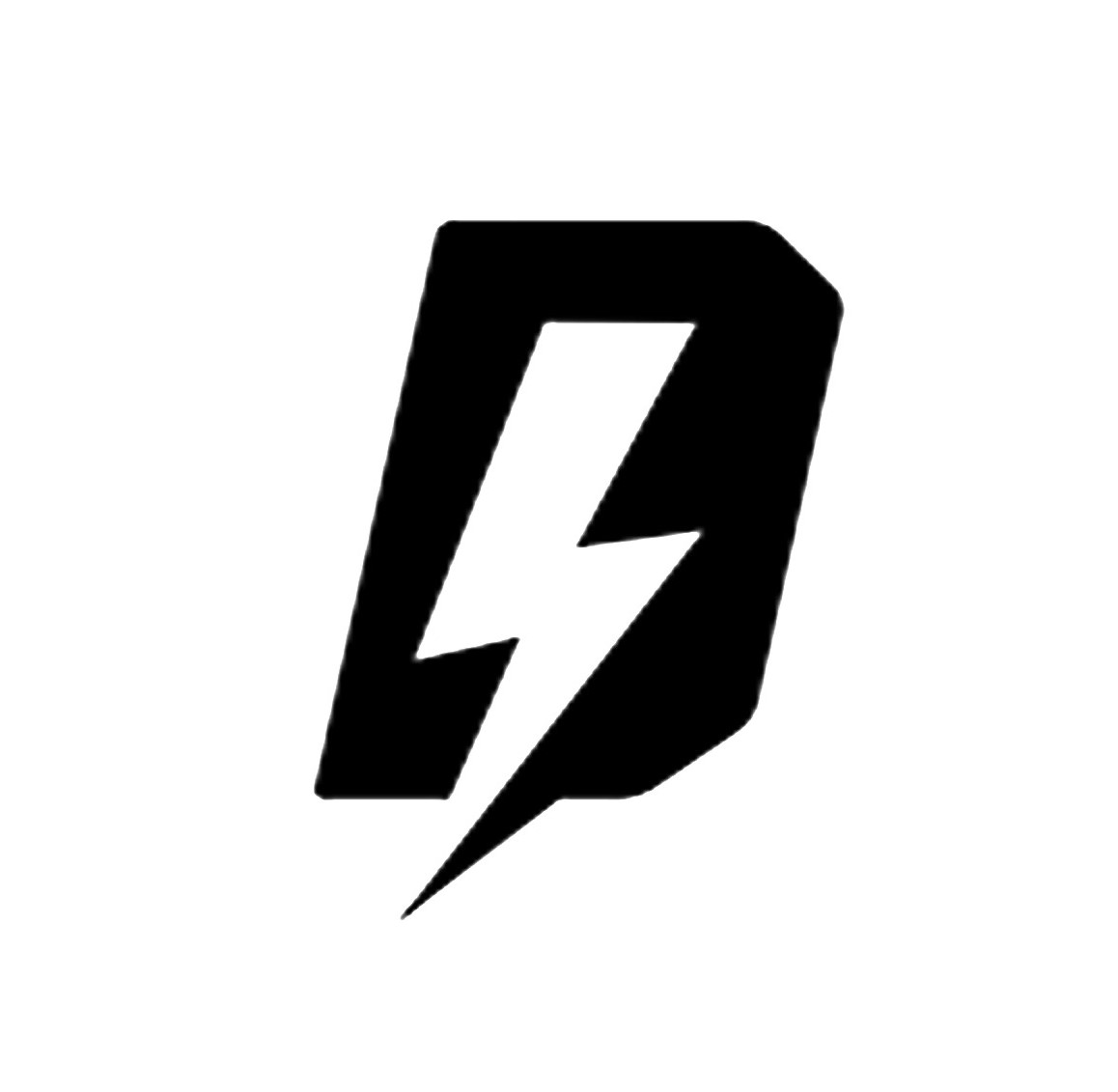
- Parent company: Warner Music Group
- Founded: August 11, 2023; 3 years ago
- Founder: Steve Carless
- Distributors: Warner Records; (United States); Warner Music Group; (International)
- Genre: Various
- Country of origin: United States
- Location: New York City, New York
- Official website: defiantxrecords.com

Defiant Records is a joint venture record label formed in 2023 between Warner Records and Steven "Steve-O" Carless, President of A&R at Warner Records. It focuses on genres such as hip-hop, R&B soul, dancehall, jersey club and drill.

The label was launched with Warner in September 2023 by Carless, an award-winning executive who has previously worked at Atlantic Records, Def Jam Recordings, Republic Records, and Uptown Records. He has worked on projects with artists Pusha-T, Big Sean, YG, 2 Chainz, Nipsey Hussle, and Polo G.

The label boasts newcomers Sha Ek, Groovy, DJ Sliink and MCvertt who was also nominated for a grammy in 2023.

== Discography ==
=== Mixtapes ===
List of mixtapes with selected details
| Title | Details | Peak chart positions |
| Title | Details | US |
|---|---|---|
| Face of the What | Release date: September 3, 2022 (US); Label: Warner/Defiant; Format: Digital download | 189 |
| Return of the Jiggy | Release date: December 9, 2022; Label: Warner/Defiant]; Format: Digital download | — |

=== Albums ===
| Artist(s) | Title | Type | Release date | Singles | Chart positions | Certifications | Refs. |
|---|---|---|---|---|---|---|---|
| Bandmanrill | "Club Godfather" | Album | October 28, 2022 | | | | —N/a |
| Sha EK | "Defiant Presents: COE" | Album | August 18, 2023 | | | Album of The Year | —N/a |
| Sha EK | " Defiant Presents: Jiggy In Jersey" | Album | August 11, 2023 | | | | —N/a |
| Sha EK | " Defiant Presents: Most Dangerous" | Album | March 17, 2023 | | | | —N/a |
| DJ Sliink | "Defiant Presents: Bricks In The 6, DJ SLiink" | Album | September 8, 2023 | | | | —N/a |
| Bandmanrill | "Defiant Presents: President OBandman, Bandmanrill & MCVertt" | Album | April 14, 2023 | | | | —N/a |
| Teejay | "I Am Chippy" | Album | February 2, 2024 | | | | —N/a |
| Groovy | "Crying In The Club" | Album | May 24, 2024 | | | | —N/a |
| Sha EK | "Defiant Presents: Chain Gang Vol 1" | Album | February 26, 2025 | | | | —N/a |

== Highlights ==
=== Hot 97 Summer Jam (2023 ===
In 2023, the label launched its first ever branded festival with WQHT Hot 97’s Summer Jam Stage featuring NLE Choppa, French Montana, Scar Lip, Sha EK, Bandmanrill, Kenzo B and MCVertt.

=== Defiant Partners With Vybz Kartel ===
In 2024, following the overturning of his 2014 conviction and subsequent release from prison, Jamaican dancehall artist Vybz Kartel partnered with Defiant Records, founded by Carless. Kartel's single "Pretty Girl," produced by Now or Never Miami and directed by Rizzy, marked his first release under this new arrangement with Defiant Records.

== Chart Positions ==
Number #1 Billboard's Heatseekers Album for Sha EK "Face of The What" 2022

Number #2 Billboard's Dance/Electronic Digital Song for DJ Sliink & Bandmanrill "Real Hips 2" single 2023

Number #3 Billboard's Rap/Hip-Hop Digital Song for MCvertt's "Face Down" ft Sexyy Red & Asap Ferg single

Number #27 Billboard's Tik Tok Top 50 Chart MCvertt "Face Down" ft Sexyy Red & Asap Ferg

Number #1 Most Added Record for Groovy's "Jersey Luv" at Urban AC radio chart

=== Singles ===
List of singles as a lead artist with selected details
| Title | Year | Album |
|---|---|---|
| "D&D" | 2020 | Face of the What |
| "We Droppin'" (feat. PGF Nuk) | 2022 | Face of the What |

“It’s About Time. 2023

- Crank Dat Too Oppy 2023
- Shot in the Party 2023
