= K-Swift =

American DJ and rapper (1978-2008)

- K-Swift at the Unruly Records 15th Year Anniversary
- Born: Khia Danielle Edgerton; October 19, 1979; Baltimore, Maryland, U.S.
- Died: July 21, 2008 (aged 29); Baltimore, Maryland, U.S.
- Presenting career
- Show: Off da Hook Radio
- Station: 92Q
- Network: Radio One
- Time slot: Monday - Friday, 6-10PM EST
- Style: Urban
- Country: United States

Khia Danielle Edgerton (October 19, 1978 – July 21, 2008), better known by the stage name K-Swift, was an American DJ, MC, radio personality and entrepreneur.

== Early years ==
Born to Joseph and Juanita Edgerton, K-Swift was raised in Randallstown, Maryland. She graduated from Randallstown High School in 1996 and went on to intern at 92Q after a brief stint at Catonsville Community College.

== Entertainment career ==
After acquiring her first set of turntables at 15 years old, K-Swift began DJing and booking parties at afterhours venue The Twilight Zone in Arbutus. She began interning at 92Q when she was 18, and worked her way through the ranks at the station until she earned a co-hosting position in 1998. The show, "OFF THE HOOK RADIO" with her co-host Squirrel Wyde, was the number one radio show in all of Baltimore.

== Entrepreneurship ==
Along with performing live and throwing parties, K-Swift owned and operated Club Queen Entertainment. K-Swift also began a Graphics Company and the Next Level Management Company, maintained a record pool, and sold her mixtapes online.

== Music career ==
K-Swift was known for DJing at Hammerjacks and The Paradox.

K-Swift released her discs through Baltimore based company, Unruly Records (as well as Next Level). Her albums were so popular and had such an enormous following in the Baltimore area that she outsold mainstream artists such as Soulja Boy Tell 'Em and Pharaoh Gamo.

== Death ==
On Sunday, July 20, 2008, just a day after she performed at Baltimore's Artscape, K-Swift hosted a pool party at her house. During the early morning of Monday, July 21, K-Swift reportedly jumped into her above-ground pool. Police reports state that there were about seven people in the pool at the time. When she did not resurface, she was pulled out and placed on an adjoining metal frame deck. K-Swift was later transported to Good Samaritan Hospital where she was pronounced dead. Thousands of fans attended her funeral, which was held at Morgan State University.

== Legacy ==
in 2009, Radio One station WERQ-FM 92Q Jams selected 30 contestants to compete for the grand prize of a Scholarship to the Sheffield Institute for the Recording Arts and an Internship at 92Q WERQ-FM Baltimore. The contest was chronicled on YouTube under "I Wanna Intern for the Q," and followed the journey of K-Swift Scholarship and Internship hopefuls through weeks of challenges including the production of a Beyonce promo, artist (Bossman) interview, and marketing at Six Flags America for Raven-Symoné. The culmination of the challenges elimination rounds resulted in the final four, Alissa Huber, Jazmine Sullivan, Tavon DJTigga Smith, and Earin Saunders. A surprise contestant, Brandon "Superman" Springfield, formerly eliminated, was reintroduced at the award ceremony. The "Final Five," along with friends and family joined 92Q and the Edgerton family for the reward ceremony at the Rowing Club in Baltimore where the winner was announced on live air. The Khia "K-Swift" Memorial Scholarship Contest and Internship was awarded to Earin Saunders who received the grand prize.

K-Swift's death was memorialized in Baltimore rapper Tate Kobang's Bank Rolls, in the verse "I swear the city ain't the same since we lost Swift. She'll live forever, to the city she was God's gift."

K-Swift was later praised for her role in bringing the genre of Baltimore club to a nationwide audience. Performer, filmmaker, and creative director TT the Artist named her label Club Queen in K-Swift's honor, with a goal to use the label to raise up works by female artists and pass on the sort of mentorship K-Swift offered others. TT the Artist's documentary Dark City: Beneath the Beat also pays tribute to K-Swift, emphasizing the influential role she had in making the club scene what it is today.

== Discography ==
- The Jumpoff Vol. 1
- The Jumpoff Vol. 2
- The Jumpoff Vol. 3
- The Jumpoff Vol. 4 - The Holiday Edition
- The Jumpoff Vol. 5
- The Jumpoff Vol. 6 - The Return
- The Jumpoff Vol. 6 - The Spring Break Edition
- The Jumpoff Vol. 7 - Summer School Edition
- The Jumpoff Vol. 8 - Next Level Edition
- The Jumpoff Vol. 9
- The Jumpoff Vol. 9 - Holiday Edition
- The Jumpoff Vol. 10 - We Fly High Edition
- The Jumpoff Vol. 11 - Not Guilty
- The Jumpoff Vol. 12
- The Jumpoff Vol. 13
- The Jumpoff Vol. 14
- K-Swift: Strictly for the Kids Part I
- K-Swift: Strictly for the Kids Part II
- The Club Queen Series Volumes 1 - 6

== Awards ==
- 2001 - Best DJ, Awarded by Baltimore City Paper
- 2004 - Best Club DJ, Awarded by Baltimore City Paper
- 2005 - Best Club DJ, Awarded by Baltimore City Paper
- 2006 - Best Club DJ, Awarded by Baltimore City Paper
