= Cookiee Kawaii =

American singer (born 1993)

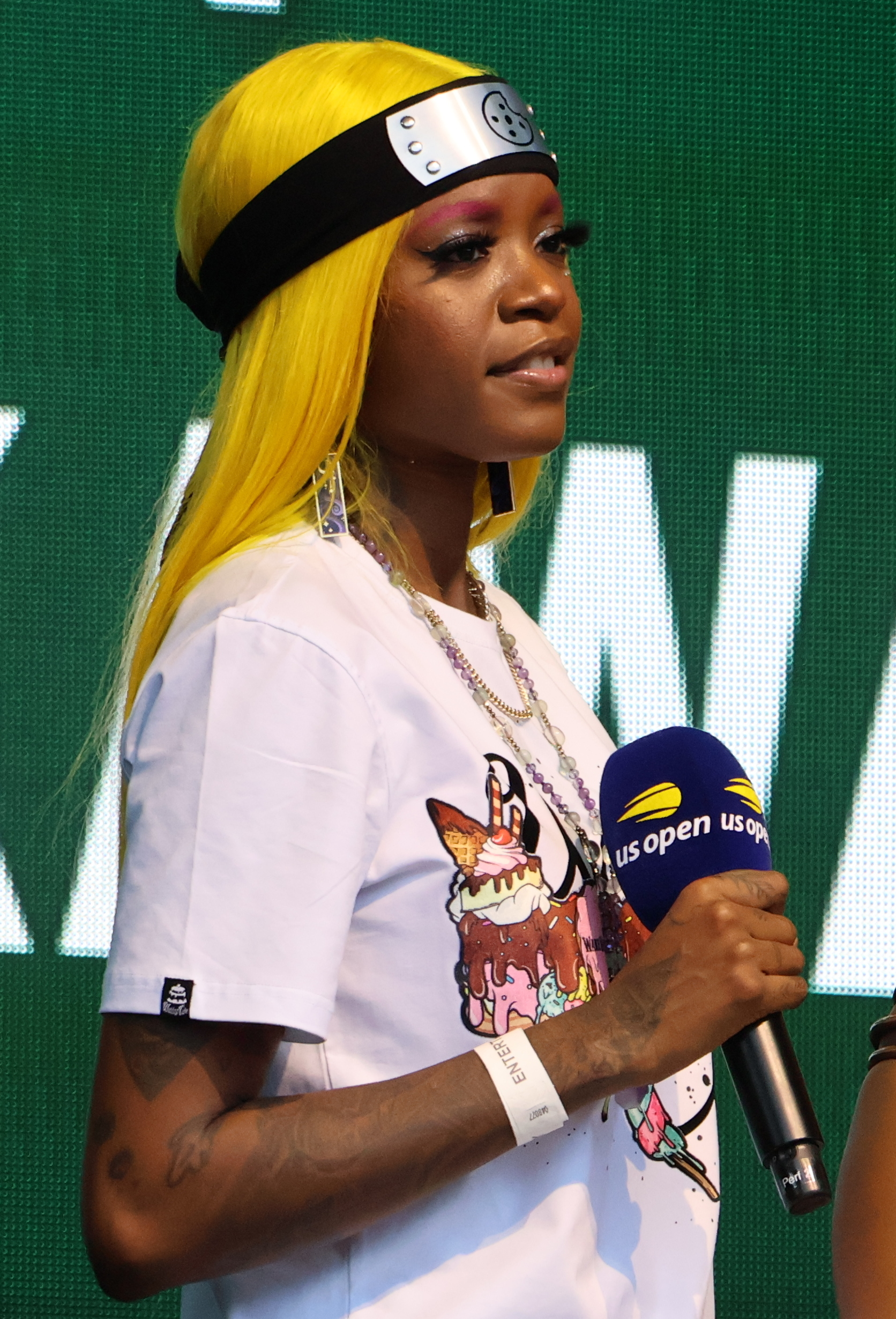
- Cookiee Kawaii in 2023

Background information
- Born: Vanice Brittany Palmer; August 5, 1993 (age 33)
- Origin: Irvington, New Jersey, U.S.
- Genres: Jersey club; R&B
- Occupations: Rapper; singer; songwriter
- Years active: 2011–present
- Label: Empire

Vanice Brittany Palmer (born August 5, 1993), known professionally as Cookiee Kawaii, is an American rapper and singer. She is best known for her song "Vibe (If I Back It Up)", which became popular on TikTok in 2020. After the song went viral, she signed to Empire, and released her debut studio album, Vanice, in 2021.

== Life and career ==
Vanice Palmer was born on August 5, 1993, and raised in Irvington, New Jersey. Her parents are both DJs, who mostly played Chicago house music. She attended Catholic school, where she performed in choirs. At age 12, she began writing poetry and performing her poems over beats and in 2011, she started making her own music. She worked various jobs, including as a stripper and a delivery driver for DoorDash and Uber Eats. While she was homeless and living out of her car, she worked as a live-in caregiver.

She began making music under the name Harajuku Cookiee, before changing it to Cookiee Kawa, and finally to Cookiee Kawaii, inspired by her love of cookies and anime. She released her debut project, Zen, in 2016. In July 2019, she released her debut mixtape Club Soda, Vol. 1. In February 2020, her breakout single, "Vibe (If I Back It Up)", went viral on TikTok after originally being released in March 2019, and was called one of the best songs of 2020 by Noisey and Vulture.

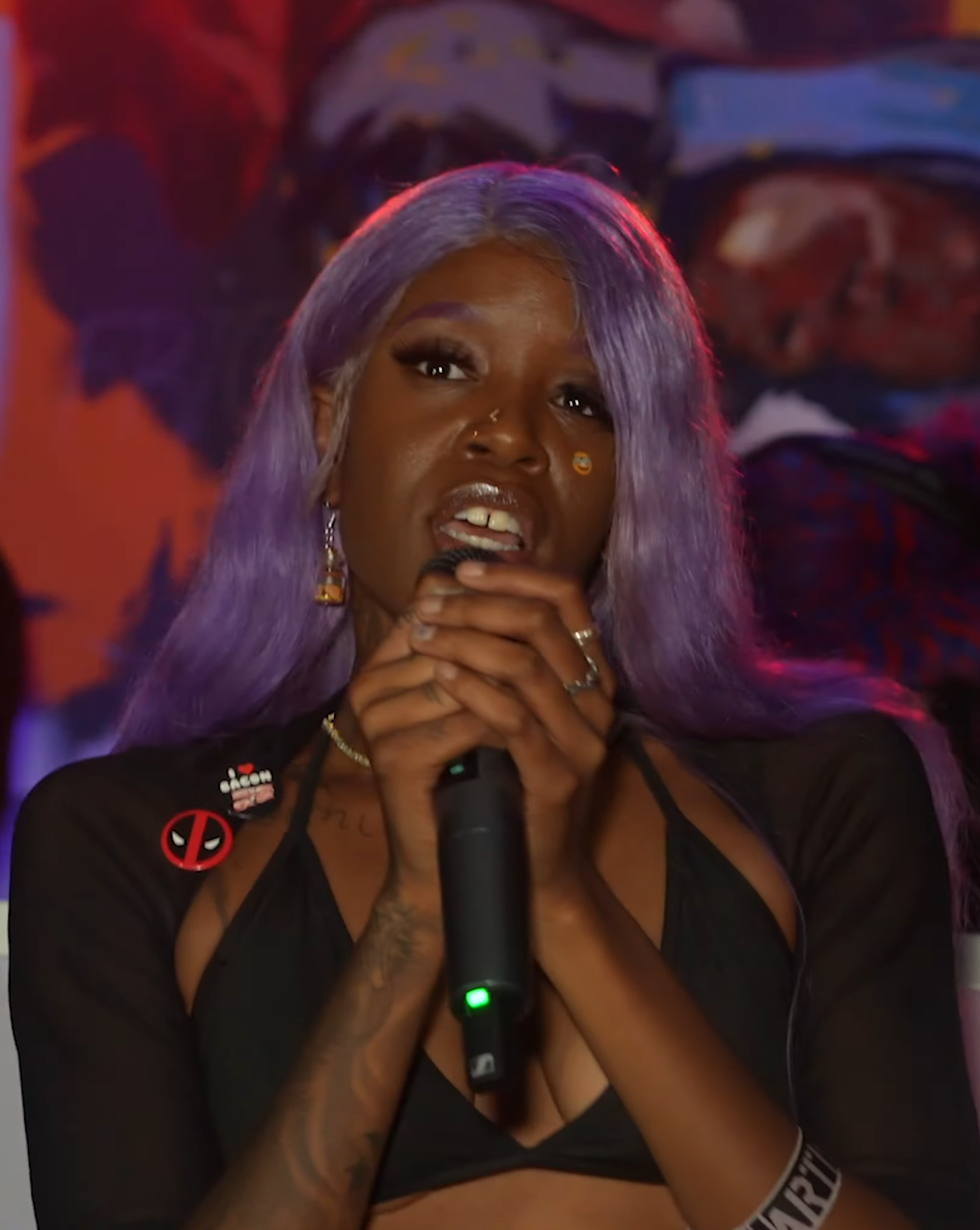
Cookiee Kawaii performing at the Afropunk After Party in New York City in 2022

She signed to Empire in March 2020, and released her second mixtape Club Soda, Vol. 2 in August 2020, which included "Vibe (If I Back It Up)". She released an animated music video for "Vibe (If I Back It Up)" in May 2020, a live-action music video for the song in August 2020, and a remix of the song featuring Tyga alongside a music video, also in August 2020. She released the single "Relax Your Mind" in May 2021. Her debut studio album, Vanice, was released on July 30, 2021, through Empire, preceded by the single "Press Play (Gamer Girl)".

== Musical style ==
Cookiee Kawaii's music has primarily been described as Jersey club. Early in her career, she made mostly R&B music, but began making Jersey club music per a suggestion from DJ Jayhood, with whom she made her first Jersey club song. Kadish Morris described her music as feeling "fluorescent, high-energy and made for partying". She has cited Missy Elliott as an influence.

== Personal life ==
Cookiee Kawaii is pansexual. Before signing with Empire, she was studying business and marketing at Essex County College. As of 2020, she lives in East Orange, New Jersey.

== Discography ==
=== Studio albums ===
List of studio albums with details
Title	Details
Zen	Released: 2016; Label: Self-released; Format: Streaming
Vanice	Released: July 30, 2021; Label: Empire; Format: Digital download, streaming

=== Extended plays ===
List of extended plays with details
Title	Details
Satori (with JTBS)	Released: December 27, 2019; Label: Self-released; Format: Digital download, streaming

==== Mixtapes ====
List of mixtapes with details
Title	Details
Club Soda, Vol. 1	Released: July 5, 2019; Label: Krystal Clear Records; Format: Digital download, streaming
Club Soda, Vol. 2	Released: August 28, 2020; Label: Empire; Format: Digital download, streaming

=== Singles ===
==== As lead artist ====
List of singles as lead artist with title, year, and album
Title	Year	Peak chart positions		Album
Title	Year	CAN	IRE	Album
"Vibe (If I Back It Up)" (solo or featuring Tyga)	2019	82	97	Club Soda, Vol. 2
"Shake Like Jello"	2019	—	—	Non-album singles
"Stop Flexxin'"	2019	—	—	Non-album singles
"Music & Poetry"	2019	—	—	Non-album singles
"Energy, Pt. 1"	2019	—	—	Non-album singles
"Energy, Pt. 2"	2019	—	—	Non-album singles
"Bounce Like Mine"	2019	—	—	Non-album singles
"Dance" (featuring TrillzMix)	2019	—	—	Non-album singles
"Waitin' On You"	2019	—	—	Non-album singles
"Vibe, Pt. 3"	2020	—	—	Non-album singles
"Hey DJ"	2021	—	—	Non-album singles
"Relax Your Mind"	2021	—	—	Vanice
"Press Play (Gamer Girl)" Violin Song by Cookiee Kawaii and Dear Silas	2021	—	—	Vanice

==== As featured artist ====
List of singles as featured artist with title, year, chart positions, and album
Title	Year	Album
"My Shit Get Back" (DJNeptune973 featuring Cookiee Kawaii)	2019	Non-album singles
"Do It Like That" (Iamsbf featuring Cookiee Kawaii)	2019	Non-album singles
"Throw It Back" (B$hip Grady featuring Cookiee Kawaii)	2020	Non-album singles
"Web of Love" (Kyng Vynce featuring Cookiee Kawaii)	2021	Non-album singles
"Baby Drive Me Crazy" (Lucid On That Wave featuring Cookiee Kawaii)	2021	Non-album singles

=== Other charted songs ===
List of charted songs with title, year, chart positions, and album
Title	Year	Peak chart positions	Album
Title	Year	US Dance	Album
"Violin" (featuring Dear Silas)	2021	46	Vanice
