= T.I.A.P.F.Y.H. =

Studio album by Left at London
- Released: June 4, 2021
- Genres: Indie pop; lo-fi; indie folk
- Length: 33:42
- Labels: Self-released; Fourth Strike
- Producers: Nat Puff; Phixel

Left at London chronology
Transgender Street Legend, Vol. 2 (2020)	T.I.A.P.F.Y.H. (2021)	Transgender Street Legend, Vol. 3 (2022)

T.I.A.P.F.Y.H. (stylized in all lowercase) is the debut studio album by American singer-songwriter and producer Left at London. Produced as part of an artist in residency program with City of Shoreline Public Art Program, the album was digitally self-released by the artist on June 4, 2021, with vinyl and cassettes released by Fourth Strike Records in May 2022. The album's title is an acronym for its two title tracks, "There is a Place for You Here" and "This is a Protest for Your Heart!!!" The album's title was announced on March 26, 2021 as t.i.a.p.f.y.h.

== Release ==
On March 26, 2021, Nat Puff announced that she would be working on her debut studio album, T.I.A.P.F.Y.H., as part of an artist in residency program with an at the time unannounced group. She clarified that You Are Not Alone Enough, the album previously announced as her debut, was pushed back. Puff had another record planned, "a Sufjan Stevens–type project, a concept album about Seattle and King County and Washington state". One song from this project, "The Ballad of Marion Zioncheck" was included on T.I.A.P.F.Y.H.

== Composition ==
T.I.A.P.F.Y.H. is an indie pop, lo-fi, and indie folk album that takes influence from an eclectic array of styles including folk, hyperpop, hip-hop, disco, and electronic music.

== Critical reception ==
Michael Rietmulder of The Seattle Times praised the song "Pills & Good Advice", calling it "a masterfully ambitious suite, and loaded with twists and turns" and praised Puff's "era-spanning attention to songcraft and deftness working with a broad and contemporary sonic palette."

== Track listing ==
All songs produced by Nat Puff, except track 7, which is produced by Puff and Phixel.

T.I.A.P.F.Y.H. track listing
No.	Title	Writer(s)	Length
1.	"Pills & Good Advice"	Nat Puff; Laura Les; Will Toledo	10:13
2.	"The Ballad of Marion Zioncheck"	Puff	4:14
3.	"There is a Place for You Here."	Puff; Alex Anderson; Stevie Knipe	3:53
4.	"Out of My Mind"	Puff	3:33
5.	"It Could Be Better"	Puff; Moore Kismet; Chromonicci	4:03
6.	"Kudzu"	Puff; William Crooks	4:14
7.	"This is a Protest for Your Heart!!!"	Puff	3:32
Total length:			33:42

T.I.A.P.F.Y.H. digital purchase edition bonus track
No.	Title	Length
8.	"?a"	2:54
Total length:		36:40

T.I.A.P.F.Y.H. physical edition bonus track
No.	Title	Length
8.	"Stars"	1:33
Total length:		35:19

Notes

- Track 3 stylized in all lowercase
- Track 7 stylized in all caps

== Personnel ==
=== Musicians ===
- Left at London – vocals, all other instruments
- Chromonicci – additional vocals (track 5)
- Kaiya Crawford – additional vocals (track 1)
- Sophia Konat – additional vocals (track 2)
- Laura Les – additional guitar (track 1)
- Lunamatic – additional drums (track 1), additional guitar (track 7)
- Vera Much – piano (track 2), additional drums (track 4)
- Robert Puff – saxophone (track 1)
- Rohan Ramdin – additional vocals (track 4), additional drums (track 4)
- Nick Villa – drums (track 6), additional drums (track 1)

=== Technical ===
- Peter Kuli – mastering (track 1), mixing engineer (track 5)
- Chuck Sutton – mastering (track 5)
- Lilian Davis – mastering (track 2)
- Ashley Ninelives – mixing engineer (tracks 2–3, 6)
