= Whipped Cream (DJ) =

WHIPPED CREAM
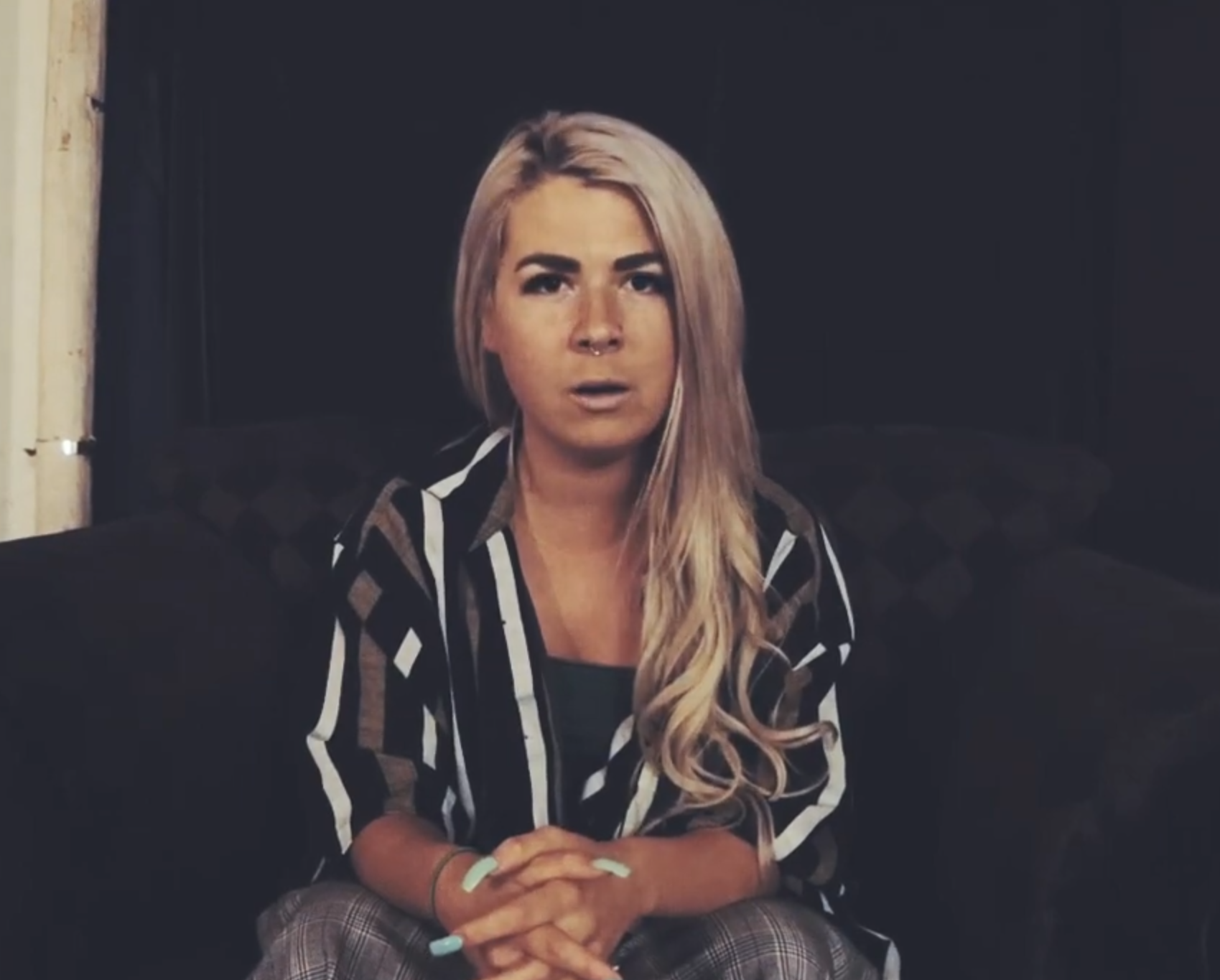
- Cecil in 2018

Background information
- Born: Caroline Cecil; Toronto, Ontario, Canada
- Origin: Nanaimo, British Columbia, Canada
- Genres: Electronic; hip hop; trap
- Occupations: Producer; DJ
- Years active: 2014–present
- Labels: Big Beat; Atlantic; Mad Decent; Nest HQ/Owsla; Monstercat
- Website: www.whippedcreammusic.com

Caroline Cecil, known professionally as WHIPPED CREAM, is a Canadian DJ and record producer based on Vancouver Island. She released her major label debut EP, Who Is Whipped Cream?, in August 2020 on Big Beat Records.

== Early life and education ==
Caroline Cecil was born in Toronto, Ontario. She and her family later moved to Nanaimo on Vancouver Island.

Cecil began ice skating at age two and was enrolled in professional figure skating lessons by age seven. She became a competitive figure skater at age eight and spent much of her youth traveling throughout Canada and the United States, competing in figure skating competitions. Her success at these events led to aspirations of joining the Canadian Olympic team. When she was 18, however, Cecil suffered a severe broken ankle while practicing triple toe loops. The injury required surgery that resulted in the insertion of a metal plate and six pins in her ankle. Although she was able to recover, she opted to forgo figure skating to pursue a career in music.

Cecil is a graduate of Woodlands Secondary School in Nanaimo.

== Career ==
In 2012, Cecil attended the Sasquatch! Music Festival where she watched a performance by Active Child that spurred her to create her own music. Using Ableton Live and a Traktor controller, she learned how to produce tracks over the next two years. She released her first single as Whipped Cream in 2014. In 2015, she released her first EP, Law of Attraction, through Unspeakable Records. She also made her first appearance as a performer at the Shambhala Music Festival in Salmo, British Columbia. In 2016, she premiered several tracks on Skrillex's Nest HQ platform. In early 2017, Whipped Cream released a collaborative EP with Hekler called Mirrors. Throughout 2017, she performed at several festivals, including Life in Color and Hardfest. In September of that year, she released a solo EP, Persistence, through Nest HQ. The lead single off that collection, "Ignorant", has accrued over 7 million streams on Spotify.

In 2018, she released several tracks including "LUV" through Big Beat Records and "Blood" via Deadbeats. She followed that with two early 2019 releases on Diplo's Mad Decent label: "You Wanted It" and "Time" (featuring DeathbyRomy). Whipped Cream made further appearances at music festivals in 2019, including at Ultra, Lollapalooza, Electric Daisy Carnival, Bonnaroo, and others. In November of that year, it was announced that Whipped Cream had been signed to the Atlantic imprint, Big Beat Records. She also released the single, "Told Ya" featuring Lil Xan.

In February 2020, her song, "So Thick" featuring Baby Goth, appeared on the soundtrack for the film, Birds of Prey. She went on to release several other singles that year, including "DUMB SH!T" (featuring Jasiah), "I Do The Most" (featuring Lil Keed), and "I Won't Let You Fall" (featuring Finn Askew). These songs would later appear on Whipped Cream's debut major label EP, Who Is Whipped Cream? (stylized in all caps), which was released in August 2020 through Big Beat and Atlantic. In March 2023, she released her debut Monstercat EP, Someone You Can Count On. It was followed in July of the same year with a remix EP, containing remixes by Borgore, hayve and GRAVEDGR. She released her next EP, Is This Real? on Monstercat on June 28, 2024.

Following the EP release, she debuted her new "Careline" project at Amsterdam Dance Event 2024.

== Discography ==
=== Extended plays ===
List of EPs with selected details
Title	Details
Law of Attraction	Released: February 24, 2015 (US); Label: Unspeakable Records; Formats: Digital download
Mirrors (with Hekler)	Released: March 31, 2017 (US); Label: Spirited; Formats: Digital download
Persistence	Released: September 19, 2017 (US); Label: Nest HQ; Formats: Digital download
Who Is Whipped Cream?	Released: August 21, 2020 (US); Label: Big Beat / Atlantic; Formats: Digital download
Someone You Can Count On	Released: March 8, 2023; Label: Monstercat; Formats: Digital Download
Is This Real?	Released: June 28, 2024; Label: Monstercat; Formats: Digital Download

=== Singles ===
List of singles with selected details
Title	Year	Album
"Ignorant"	2017	Persistence
"Luv"	2018	Non-album singles
"Blood"	2018	Non-album singles
"You Wanted It"	2019	Non-album singles
"Shouldn't" (with Reaper)	2019	Non-album singles
"Told Ya" (featuring Lil Xan)	2019	Who Is Whipped Cream?
"Dumb Sh!t" (with Jasiah)	2020	Who Is Whipped Cream?
"I Do The Most" (with Lil Keed)	2020	Who Is Whipped Cream?
"IDFC" (featuring Perto and Ravenna Golden)	2020	Who Is Whipped Cream?
"I Won't Let You Fall" (featuring Finn Askew)	2020	Who Is Whipped Cream?
"So Thick" (featuring Baby Goth)	2020	Who Is Whipped Cream?
"So Thick" (featuring Baby Goth)	2020	Birds of Prey: The Album
"Light of Mine" (with Jimorrow)	2021	Non-album singles
"Hold Up" (with Moore Kismet, Big Freedia and Uniiqu3)	2022	Non-album singles
"Cry"	2022	Someone You Can Count On
"Child"	2022	Non-album singles
"Angels"	2022	Someone You Can Count On
"Be Here (La La La)" (with The Duchess)	2022	Someone You Can Count On
"All Eyes On Me" (with Jean Deaux)	2022	Non-album singles
"The Dark" (with Jasiah and Crimson Child)	2023	Someone You Can Count On
"Lost My Way"	2023	Non-album singles
"Who's Laughing Now" (with Fourfive)	2024	Non-album singles
"Still?"	2024	Is This Real?
"About You" (with Showjoe)	2024	Is This Real?
"I Am A God" (with Nostalgix)	2024	Non-album singles
"Erased" (with Andrea Botez)	2025	Non-album singles
