= Sha EK =

American rapper

Sha Ek
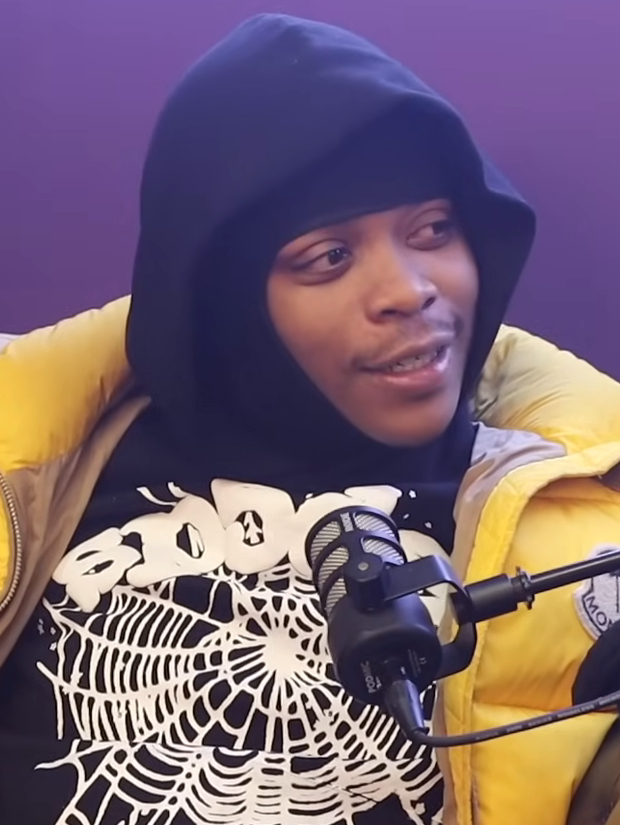
- Sha EK in 2025

Background information
- Also known as: Sha EK
- Born: Chalim Sokmen Perry; April 8, 2003 (age 23); The Bronx, New York City, U.S.
- Genres: East Coast hip-hop; Bronx drill
- Occupation: Rapper
- Years active: 2018–present
- Labels: Warner (former); Defiant Records

Chalim Perry (born April 8, 2003), known professionally as Sha EK (Sha Everything K), is an American rapper. He is signed to Warner Music and Defiant Records. He released his major label debut mixtape, Face of the What, on September 2, 2022.

== Early life ==
Chalim Perry was born and raised in the Melrose neighborhood of the South Bronx borough of New York City, New York with Honduran parents. At age 15, he suffered a gunshot wound, which prompted him to start drill rapping. He is half-brothers with rapper Pj Glizzy. Perry and rapper Lil Tjay were childhood friends. According to Perry, Lil Tjay supported his rap career early on by reposting his music.

== Career ==
Perry started releasing music at 15, beginning in 2018. In 2020, he released the single "D&D". The song would go on to accumulate 8 million streams on Spotify by September 2022. In July 2022, Sha EK signed with Warner Records, and the following month he released the single "We Droppin'" featuring PGF Nuk. That song appeared on his major label debut mixtape, Face of the What, in September 2022. The collection also featured guest appearances from SleazyWorld Go and Bandmanrill. In September 2022, Sha EK and other drill rappers were prevented by local police from performing at Rolling Loud, due to fears of violence.

== Legal issues ==
In February 2025, Perry was arrested and charged with attempted murder and other crimes stemming from his alleged role in a shooting incident in the previous year. Police allege that he shot and injured three people. He is facing 23 charges related to the incident.

He was released on a $5,000 bail on March 4, 2025 and then two days later on March 6, 2025, he and six other alleged members of the OGz/COE (Courtlandt Over Everything) gang were indicted on conspiracy and attempted murder charges. Listed in the indictment were acts of violence that includes four shootings that terrorized the residents of Bronx neighborhoods Mott Haven and Melrose. His bail was set for $300,000 and as of now, it has remained unpaid and Perry remains incarcerated on Riker's Island.

== Discography ==
=== Mixtapes ===
Mixtapes with selected details
Title	Details	Peak chart positions
Title	Details	US
Face of the What	Release date: September 3, 2022 (US); Label: Warner/Defiant; Format: Digital download	189
Return of the Jiggy	Release date: December 9, 2022; Label: Warner/Defiant; Format: Digital download	—

=== Singles ===
List of singles as a lead artist with selected details
Title	Year	Album
"D&D"	2021	Face of the What
"We Droppin'" (feat. PGF Nuk)	2022	Face of the What
"It's About Time"	2022	
"Crank Dat Too Oppy"	2023	
"Shot in the Party"	2023	
"Luv 4 My Block"	2023	
