= DJ Tameil =

American DJ and record producer

- Birth name: Tameil Paynes
- Born: Newark, New Jersey, U.S.
- Genres: Jersey club, Baltimore club, Chicago house
- Occupation(s): Musician, DJ, producer
- Labels: Anthrax; Brick City Squad

Tameil Paynes (known by his stage name DJ Tameil) is an American disc jockey and record producer from Newark, New Jersey. He is credited with pioneering the Jersey club style of dance music in the late 1990s, drawing influence from Baltimore club and Chicago house. He is a member of the Brick Bandits, a collective of pioneering Newark musicians.

== Career ==
Tameil became known for his Chicago house mixtapes as a teenager. He later established connections with the Baltimore scene; he was subsequently introduced to Baltimore stars such as DJ Technics and Rod Lee. He began playing Baltimore records at teen parties and clubs in the Downtown Newark area.

Tameil was among the first Jersey artists to produce his own club tracks in 2001 with the Dat Butt EP, released on his own label Anthrax Records. He began to burn his own CDs and sold them on Broad Street in Newark. Around this time, DJs Tim Dolla and Mike V also began producing their own club tracks as the Brick Bandits to challenge Tameil's monopoly on the market. The two parties initially feuded but Tameil later joined the group, coining the phrase "Brick City club" in 2002. They released popular mixtapes which featured both club and house tracks. Club parties, hosted primarily in ballrooms and banquet halls, began emerging in Newark and surrounding suburbs such as East Orange and Irvington. Despite violence in the city, parties thrown by the Brick Bandits or at the Branch Brook Skating Rink were known to be safe spaces for kids.
