= Left at London =

American singer-songwriter and comedian

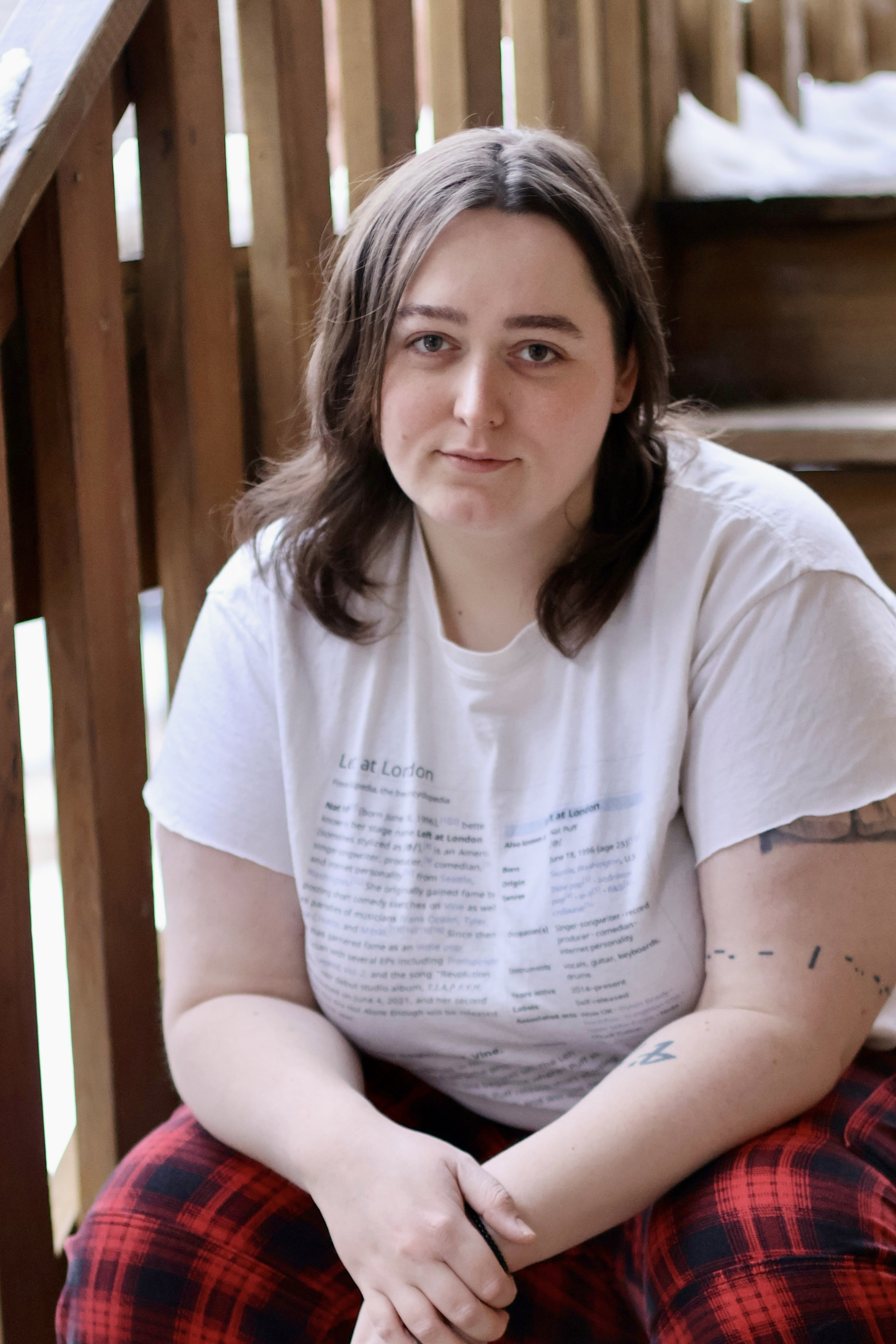

Background information
- Also known as: Nat Puff; /@/
- Born: June 18, 1996 (age 30)
- Origin: Seattle, Washington, U.S.
- Genres: Indie pop; bedroom pop
- Occupations: Singer-songwriter; record producer; comedian; internet personality
- Instruments: Vocals; guitar; keyboards; drums
- Years active: 2014–present
- Label: Fourth Strike
- Website: leftatlondon.com

Nat Puff (born June 18, 1996), better known by her stage name Left at London (sometimes stylized as /@/), is an American singer-songwriter, producer, comedian, and internet personality from Seattle, Washington. She originally gained fame by posting short comedy sketches on Vine as well as parodies of musicians Frank Ocean, Tyler, the Creator, and Mitski. Since then she has garnered fame as an indie pop musician with several EPs including the Transgender Street Legend trilogy and the song "Revolution Lover". Her debut studio album, T.I.A.P.F.Y.H. was released on June 4, 2021, and her second studio album You Are Not Alone Enough is expected to be released in the near future.

== Music career ==
=== 2014–2019: Early career, The Purple Heart, and Transgender Street Legend Vol. 1 ===
Puff first began writing songs in fifth grade. The Left at London project originally started as a band, though after the project fell apart Puff kept the previous group's moniker as her stage name, as she was uncomfortable using her legal name. The name Left at London comes from an experience where Puff misread the sign of a local bar called "The Loft at Tandem". In 2014 and 2015, while still in high school, Puff released three demo EPs, Youth Group Computer, 2 Rowdy 4 Dennys / Give Peace a Break, and Will Write Songs 4 Money, all receiving very limited releases. The EPs were later re-released on Bandcamp on February 5, 2021.

Puff released her first widely released extended play, The Purple Heart on June 18, 2018. On November 10 that same year, she also released Transgender Street Legend, Vol. 1. The later EP featured her breakout single "Revolution Lover" which went on to receive a music video and be featured in an episode of Welcome to Night Vale. In that same year, she began to gain significant online attention thanks to the success of her viral Twitter video titled "How to Make a Frank Ocean Song". In 2019, additional parodies of Tyler, the Creator and Mitski further popularized Left at London, including recognition from both artists.

=== 2019–2022: Transgender Street Legend Vol. 2 and T.I.A.P.F.Y.H. ===
In December 2019, Puff released the Dylan Brady-produced "6 Feet", the first single from Transgender Street Legend, Vol. 2. The same month she released "Santa's Homophobic", a comedic Christmas song featuring Dominique "SonicFox" McLean and SungWon Cho. "Blacknwhite (Radio Edit)" was released on January 14, 2020, as the lead single to her second studio album (at the time announced as her debut) You Are Not Alone Enough, an album themed around her mental health.

On March 17, 2020, Puff released You Wouldn't Download a Car, a mixtape of her own remixes of various popular songs. On July 20, 2020, she released the two song EP Jenny Durkan, Resign in Disgrace. The EP's title refers to Jenny Durkan, then mayor of Seattle, who Puff holds responsible for condoning police violence and causing "the citizens of a historically gay neighborhood to be gassed on the first day of Pride Month." The songs on the EP were also inspired by the establishment of the Capitol Hill Autonomous Zone and the murders of Charleena Lyles and Summer Taylor. The first track "Do You See Us?" appears on Transgender Street Legend, Vol. 2. On July 24, she released the four-track covers EP This One's For the Milfs, featuring covers of songs by Janelle Monae, Billie Eilish, Ginuwine, and Kanye West. A day later Tales From Transgender Street, an album of Left at London covers by other artists, was released and promoted through a virtual concert of the same name. Transgender Street Legend, Vol. 2 was released on September 25, 2020.

On September 29, 2020, Puff announced that she was working on new music, part of a new duo called WOW OK. The band released their first track, a remix of "(FOREVER!!!!!!!!!)" by Glass Beach on March 5, 2021. Their debut single, "Holy Moment", was released on April 16, 2021.

On March 26, 2021, Puff announced that she would spend the next two months working on her debut album, T.I.A.P.F.Y.H., as part of an artist residency with the City of Shoreline Public Art Program. The release of You Are Not Alone Enough, the album previously announced as her debut, was pushed back. t.i.a.p.f.y.h. was released on June 3, 2021.

=== 2022–present: Transgender Street Legend Vol. 3 and upcoming studio albums ===
In January 2022 Puff shared on Twitter that she aimed to finish You Are Not Alone Enough in April 2022 with a "mid-late fall release date", but it is still yet to release.

In March 2022, Puff confirmed that the final volume of the Transgender Street Legend series had been finished and entered the mastering stage. She stated that the EP would be soul and Contemporary R&B inspired. On her Patreon she shared a song from the EP called "My Old Ways" on February 11, 2022. The lead single "Make You Proud" released on June 17, 2022. Transgender Street Legend, Vol. 3 released on June 24, 2022.

Puff is currently working on her third studio album, announcing a finalized conceptual tracklist consisting of 15 tracks.

== Personal life ==
Puff is a lesbian and a non-binary trans woman who uses she/her pronouns. She has ADHD, PTSD, borderline personality disorder and OSDD-1b, and is also autistic. She has frequently voiced support of plural systems. She says that her autism is what allows her to be so good at impressions, saying "I'm used to mimicking others in order to seem neurotypical and I've gotten really adept at observing things like speech patterns". She began posting short videos on Vine in 2014,, with pseudo name "Jonatan Timson".

== Discography ==
Left at London discography
- Studio albums: 1
- EPs: 9
- Compilation albums: 1
- Singles: 10
- Mixtape: 1

=== Albums ===
Studio albums

Title	Album details
T.I.A.P.F.Y.H.	Released: June 3, 2021; Label: Self-released, Fourth Strike; Format: LP, cassette, digital download, streaming
You Are Not Alone Enough	Released: TBA

Compilation albums

Title	Album details
Transgender Street Legend: The ACAB Anthology (Assigned Compilation At Birth)	Released: June 6, 2025; Label: Needlejuice; Format: LP, CD, cassette, digital download, streaming

Mixtape

Title	Album details
You Wouldn't Download A Car	Released: March 17, 2020; Label: Self-released; Format: Digital download

=== Extended plays ===
Title	Album details
Youth Group Computer	Released: October 4, 2014; Label: Self-released; Format: CD, digital download
2 Rowdy 4 Dennys / Give Peace a Chance	Released: November 18, 2014; Label: Self-released; Format: Cassette, streaming, digital download
Will Write Songs 4 Money	Released: June 2, 2015; Label: Self-released; Format: CD, digital download
The Purple Heart	Released: June 18, 2018; Label: Self-released; Format: Vinyl, digital download
Transgender Street Legend, Vol. 1	Released: November 10, 2018; Label: Self-released; Format: Vinyl, digital download
Jenny Durkan, Resign in Disgrace	Released: July 20, 2020; Label: Self-released; Format: Digital download
This One's For the Milfs	Released: July 24, 2020; Label: Self-released; Format: Digital download
Transgender Street Legend, Vol. 2	Released: September 25, 2020; Label: Self-released; Format: Digital download
Transgender Street Legend, Vol. 3	Released: June 24, 2022; Label: Self-released; Formats: Digital download
Stone Fruit (with G.rola)	Released: November 4, 2022; Label: Self-released; Formats: Digital download

=== Singles ===
As lead artist

Title	Year	Album
"I Don't Trust U Anymore"	2017	Transgender Street Legend, Vol. 1
"Revolution Lover"	2018	Transgender Street Legend, Vol. 1
"Oh, Maker"	2019	This One's For the Milfs
"6 Feet"	2019	Transgender Street Legend, Vol. 2
"Santa's Homophobic" (featuring Dominique "SonicFox" McLean and SungWon Cho)	2019	Non-album single
"Blacknwhite (Radio Edit)"	2020	You Are Not Alone Enough
"Do You See Us?" (featuring Nobi)	2020	Jenny Durkan, Resign in Disgrace and Transgender Street Legend, Vol. 2
"Safety First" (featuring Vera Much)	2020	Transgender Street Legend, Vol. 2
"T-Shirt"	2020	Transgender Street Legend, Vol. 2
"I Get Knocked Down" (featuring Jedwill)	2021	Non-album single
"Bloodlust"	2021	Non-album single
"Make You Proud" (featuring TYGKO)	2022	Transgender Street Legend, Vol. 3
"lol." (featuring Jedwill & Wishlane)	2023	Non-album single
Bright Lights (featuring Justin Arena)	2025	Non-album single
T-Shirt	2025	Non-album single
RAH TAH RMX	2025	Non-album single

As featured artist

Title	Year	Album
"How Long?" (Gerard David Millman featuring Left at London)	2019	The Banana Incident
"Where Did I Go?" (Yung Skrrt featuring Left at London)	2020	Non-album single
"Falling4u" (Nari featuring Left at London)	2021	Non-album single

Other appearances

- Vera Much — "Mortifying Ordeal of Being Known" (2020)
- Phixel — "Childish" (2021)
- Knock Monsterr – "In My Walls" (2022)

=== Songwriting and production credits ===
- "Dumb Bitch Juice" — Alice Longyu Gao (2019)
- "Pushing Boulders" — Yesterday's Analog Earth Band (2019)
- "How Long?" — Gerard David Millman (2019)
- "Dumb Fast!" — Kaiya Crawford (2020)
- "Where Did I Go?" — Yung Skrrt (2020)
- "Mortifying Idea of Being Known" — Vera Much (2020)
- "Semiautomatic (demo)" — William Crooks (2020)
- "Tired" — Kaiya Crawford (2020)
- "How Do I?" — Kaiya Crawford (2020)
- "From Such a Distance" – Marbits (2021)

=== As part of WOW OK ===
Albums

- WOW OK (2026)

Singles

- "Holy Moment" (2021)
- "27 Club" (2023)

Remixes

- "(FOREVER!!!!!!!!!)" — Glass Beach (2021)
