= Bandmanrill =

American rapper

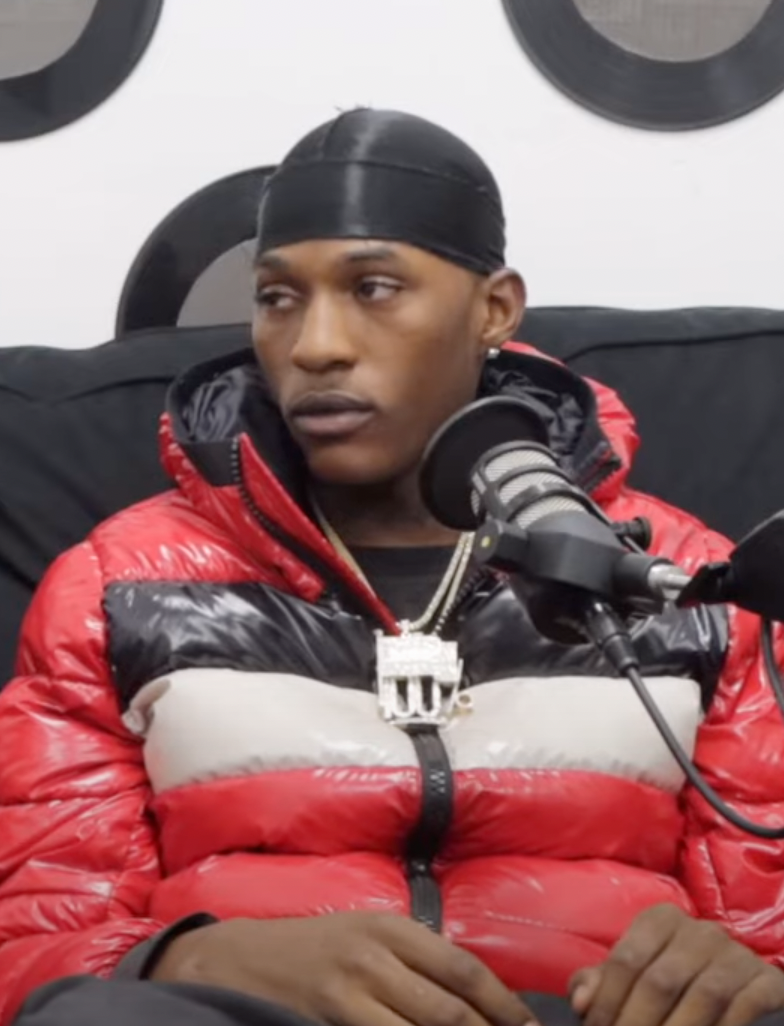
- Bandmanrill in June 2022

Background information
- Born: 2001 or 2002 (age 23–24); Newark, New Jersey U.S.
- Genres: Hip hop; trap; drill; Jersey club
- Occupations: Rapper; songwriter
- Years active: 2020–present
- Label: 100%Pure: Warner Music Group

Siril Pettus, known professionally as Bandmanrill, is an American rapper from Newark, New Jersey. He is currently signed to 100%Pure and Warner Music Group and is noted as a pioneer of the hip-hop scene with his fusing of elements of Jersey club and drill.

== Career ==
Bandmanrill began rapping in 2020 during the COVID-19 pandemic. In April 2021, he released his track "Heartbroken" which was selected by Pitchfork as the "must-hear rap song of the day". In November 2021, he released a freestyle titled "Tonight’s Da Night Freestyle". In August 2022, he released his single titled "Real Hips", which is described by Jon Caramanica of The New York Times as "a surprisingly luscious and nimble offering from the Newark rapper Bandmanrill that makes plain the through lines that connect drill music, Jersey club and bass music". In October 2022, he released his debut project Club Godfather., which contains collaborations with NLE Choppa, Lay Bankz, Skaiwater, Sha EK, and DJ Swill B.
