= Hammerjacks =

Former music venue in Baltimore, Maryland

Coordinates: 39°17′35″N 76°36′40″W

Hammerjacks was a music venue in downtown Baltimore which operated from 1977 to 2006. It was founded by Louis J. Principio III. The bands ranged from punk, glam, thrash and heavy metal acts most commonly associated with the venue (e.g., Guns N' Roses, Kix, Ratt, Skid Row, Extreme or Wrathchild America) to pop (e.g., Badfinger) and alternative rock groups (e.g., Ramones and Goo Goo Dolls). Hammerjacks, however, attracted audiences with other attire as well.

Hammerjacks initially operated from a converted rowhouse on 1000 S. Charles St, then moved to an old brewery building at 1101 S. Howard St in 1982. The building was torn down on June 12, 1997, to make way for an M&T Bank Stadium parking lot. Hammerjacks was billed as "The largest nightclub on the east coast."

In 2000, Hammerjacks reopened at 316-318 Guilford Ave, which had formerly been used as a car wash. It was put under new management in 2004, and closed in 2006.

== In media ==
The club was featured in John Waters' 1994 film Serial Mom, with grunge band L7 playing the band Camel Lips. It was the location where Kathleen Turner's character Beverly Sutphin was arrested for murder. Interior and exterior views of the club have been featured in music videos, including the band Kix.

An image of a sign for the club appeared on the Iron Maiden album Somewhere In Time.

== A new beginning ==
In the fall of 2021, a new Hammerjacks location opened at 1300 Russell Street. The new ownership group decided to construct the outdoor portion of the facility first due to the COVID-19 pandemic. The newly constructed facility hosts concerts, special events, private events and Baltimore Ravens tailgate events. Plans for an indoor facility are not yet announced.

Live Performances
DATE	HEADLINER	SUPPORT
May 13, 2022	Eptic	
July 1, 2022	Jauz	
July 3, 2022	Everclear	Fastball
July 23, 2022	Sleeping with Sirens	Don Broco
August 4, 2022	Gov't Mule	
August 19, 2022	Michael Franti & Spearhead	Arrested Development
August 22, 2022	Andy Frasco & The U.N.	Nelly's Echo
September 1, 2022	Trombone Shorty & Orleans Avenue	
September 17, 2022	Clutch	Helmet
September 22, 2022	Action Bronson	Meyhem Lauren
