= OKE: Operation Kill Everything =

Mixtape by The Game
- Released: October 8, 2013
- Recorded: 2012–2013
- Genre: Hip hop
- Length: 76:40
- Label: Crow It Up Records
- Producers: Cardiak; CritiCal; Pops; Pilz; DJ Mustard; SAP; Cool & Dre; Antwan "Amadeus" Thompson; League of Starz; 2oolman; Burd & Keyz; Big Duke; JP Did This 1; Shonuff

The Game chronology
| Jesus Piece (2012) | OKE: Operation Kill Everything (2013) | Blood Moon: Year of the Wolf (2014) |

OKE: Operation Kill Everything (simply known as OKE) is the fourteenth mixtape by American rapper the Game, which was hosted by DJ Skee. The mixtape was released on October 8, 2013, and serves as his first project since leaving the Interscope Records, following the release of his fifth album Jesus Piece (2012). It was also released in promotion of his upcoming sixth studio album. The mixtape features guest appearances from Too Short, Schoolboy Q, Chris Brown, Lil Wayne, Problem, Nipsey Hussle, Juicy J, Young Jeezy, Clyde Carson, Skeme, Stat Quo and Ty Dolla $ign; as well as the production provided by Cardiak, DJ Mustard, SAP and Cool & Dre, among others.

== Background ==
In December 2012, the Game released Jesus Piece, the final album on his contract with Interscope Records. Just before its release he founded Rolex Records with Stat Quo, which was later renamed The Firm. On May 7, 2013, the Game announced a new mixtape Operation Kill Everything was almost finished recording. Later that same day, the Game released a remix to Kendrick Lamar's "Bitch Don't Kill My Vibe", which was originally thought to be the first song from the album. Then on July 16, 2013, he released remixes to Migos' "Versace" and TeeFlii's "This D".

On October 7, 2013, the Game released the cover artwork to the mixtape, the title which now just shortened to OKE. He also revealed it would be released the following day. On October 8, 2013, the Game announced that he would premiere OKE later that night on DJ Skee's SKEE TV on AXS TV. The mixtape featured guest appearances by Too Short, Schoolboy Q, Diddy, Chris Brown, Lil Wayne, Problem, Nipsey Hussle, Juicy J, Young Jeezy, Stat Quo, Skeme, Elijah Blake, Shontelle, Clyde Carson, Joe Moses, Stacy Barthe, Fred the Godson, Sam Hook, K. Roosevelt and Ty$. Production on the mixtape was handled by Cardiak, DJ Mustard, SAP, and Cool & Dre among others.

Two days after its free release, the Game released a deluxe edition of OKE to iTunes, featuring two bonus tracks, including "Hollywood" a song with Scarface. The deluxe edition is free of DJ drops and tags, and includes a digital booklet. In the song, the Game takes shot at former G-Unit cohort 50 Cent saying, "Hub City thugs wit me, buck 50/Reunite with G-Unit, bitch fuck 50."

== Critical reception ==
Professional ratings
Review scores
| Source | Rating |
|---|---|
| The Badger Herald | 5/5 stars |
| BET | 5/5 stars |
| HipHopDX | (positive) |
| XXL | 3/5 (L) |

OKE was met with generally positive reviews from music critics. Jake Rohn of BET gave the mixtape a perfect score, saying "OKE is one of his best efforts, album or mixtape. While Game's lyrics are still laced with the angst of feeling slept on, the imposing rhymer shows more willingness to step ever-so-slightly outside his comfort zone, showcasing different tempos and rocking different sounding beats. Game may not be rollin' with Dre anymore, but he shows that he can still drop a classic." Louis Johnson of The Badger Herald also gave the mixtape a perfect score, saying "Overall, OKE combines refreshing instrumentals with classic Game: taking shots at anyone and everyone yet staying original and proactive in his lyrical content. This may be his most focused piece of work since his debut album, The Documentary. Game truly stepped up to the plate this time." Omar Burgress of HipHopDX deemed the mixtape "EP-worthy" saying, "On OKE: Operation Kill Everything, Game is comfortable in his own skin, mixing ratchet material with deeply personal songs all while accommodating his guests."

XXL gave the mixtape a more mixed review saying, "There’s a duality that plays out over the course of the tape that very accurately showcases two extraordinarily different sides of the current West Coast scene. On the one hand, you have the super soulful, rich production more representative of acts like Jake One, THC, Scoop DeVille, DJ Dahi and the Futuristiks, and on the other hand you have what producer DJ Mustard has affectionately coined “ratchet music.” Both make up solid chunks of the project, but only one finds Game truly in his element. The smooth soul serves as a perfect juxtaposition with Game’s gruff voice and aggressive content, and he flourishes in these instances. But just as you start to settle in, the entire tone of the project changes, and it detracts from the fluidity and the aesthetic value. Experimentation is fine, but sometimes it’s better to stick to your niche."

== Commercial performance ==
The deluxe edition version of the mixtape debuted at number 89 on the Billboard 200 chart, with first-week sales of 5,000 copies in the United States.

== Track listing ==
| No. | Title | Producer(s) | Length |
|---|---|---|---|
| 1. | "Kill Everything" (featuring Diddy) | Cardiak, Critacal | 5:10 |
| 2. | "Life Is But a Dream" (featuring Elijah Blake) | V Don | 3:43 |
| 3. | "Astronaut Pussy / Welcome to California" (featuring Schoolboy Q, Skeme, Stacy Barthe and Too Short) | Pops & Pilz | 10:46 |
| 4. | "In the City" (featuring Fred the Godson and Sam Hook) | Sap | 3:13 |
| 5. | "F.I.V.E." (featuring Chris Brown and Lil Wayne) | Sap, Cool & Dre | 2:48 |
| 6. | "Love on Fire" (featuring Shontelle) | Amadeus | 3:52 |
| 7. | "Breakfast With Al Pacino" | Cool & Dre | 3:45 |
| 8. | "Oh Lord" (featuring Shontelle) | Pops | 2:35 |
| 9. | "TD" (featuring Problem) | League of Starz | 3:56 |
| 10. | "Same Hoes" (featuring Nipsey Hussle and Ty Dolla $ign) | DJ Mustard | 3:44 |
| 11. | "Turn Down for What" (featuring Clyde Carson and Problem) | League of Starz | 3:21 |
| 12. | "Fuck a Bitch" (featuring Elijah Blake, Joe Moses and Nipsey Hussle) | League of Starz | 3:50 |
| 13. | "Compton" (featuring Stat Quo) | Sap | 3:25 |
| 14. | "Swerve" | 2oolman, Pops | 4:18 |
| 15. | "Super Throwed" (featuring Juicy J) | Sap | 5:06 |
| 16. | "You Don't Know" | Burd & Keyz | 2:14 |
| 17. | "Just So You Know" (featuring Queen) | Big Duke, JPDidThis1, Young Yonny | 3:42 |
| 18. | "Maybe In Another Life" (featuring K Roosevelt) | Pops | 3:38 |
| 19. | "Pour Up (Remix)" (featuring Clyde Carson and Young Jeezy) | Shonuff | 3:34 |

Deluxe edition bonus tracks
| No. | Title | Length |
|---|---|---|
| 20. | "Delete All That Shit (Outro)" | 0:06 |
| 21. | "Hollywood" (featuring Scarface) | 2:51 |

== Chart positions ==
| Chart (2013) | Peak position |
|---|---|
| UK R&B Albums (Official Charts) | 20 |
| US Billboard 200 | 89 |
| US Top R&B/Hip-Hop Albums (Billboard) | 19 |
