= Tish Hyman =

American singer-songwriter

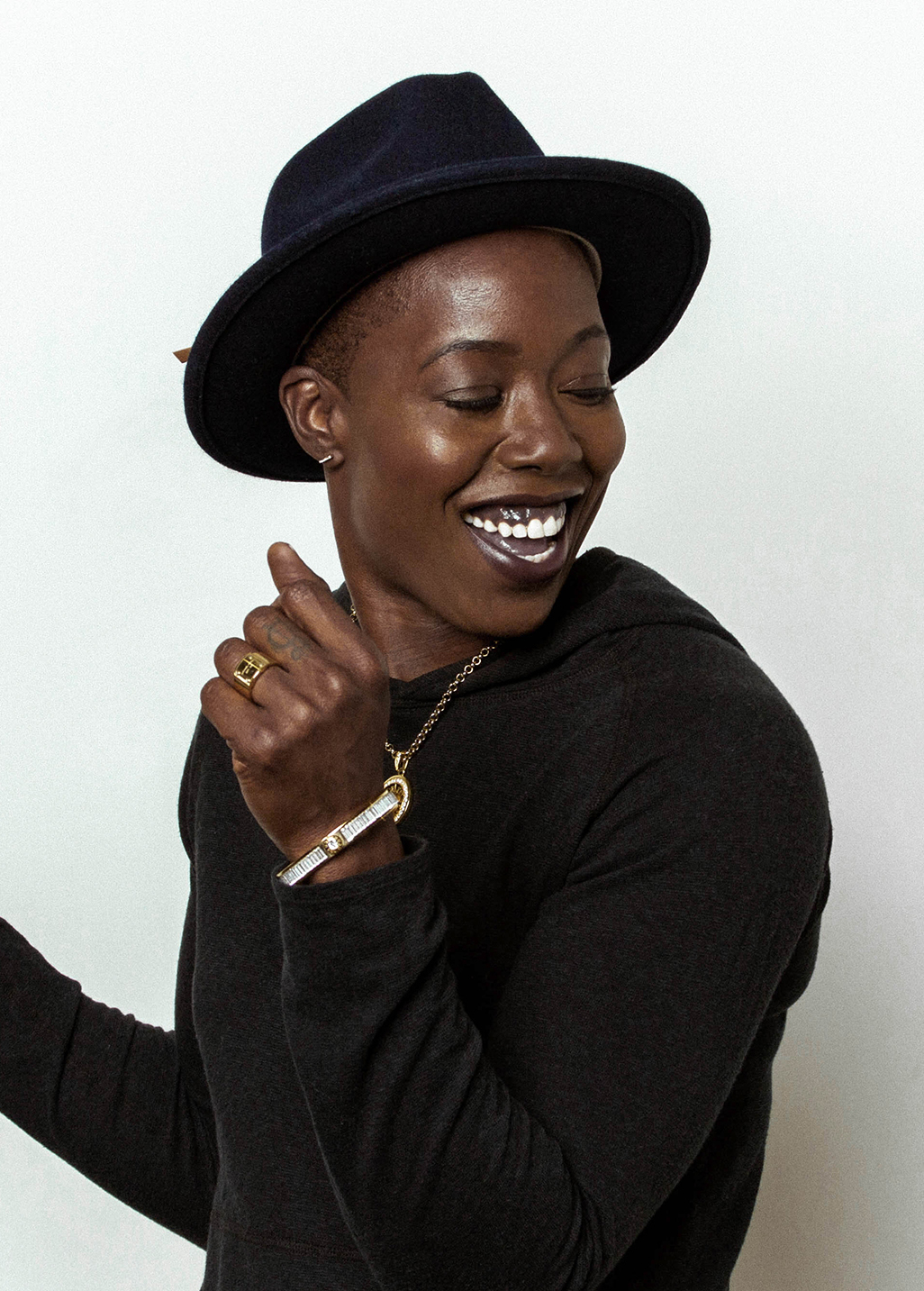
- Hyman in 2015

Background information
- Also known as: Listen2Tish
- Born: Latisha Hyman; 1982 or 1983 (age 43–44); The Bronx, New York, US
- Genres: Pop rap; R&B
- Occupations: Singer; rapper; songwriter; record producer
- Years active: 2012–present
- Labels: Listen2Tish; Empire
- Website: listen2tish.com

Latisha "Tish" Hyman (born 1982 or 1983) is an American singer-songwriter, rapper, and record producer. She was also a candidate for mayor of Los Angeles in the 2026 election.

== Early life ==
Latisha Hyman was born and raised in the Bronx, New York, where she began battle rapping at an early age. She attended the Fiorello H. LaGuardia High School of Music and Art and Performing Arts.

== Career ==
=== Beginnings ===
In 2010 Hyman moved to Los Angeles, California and began writing songs for other artists. In 2011 she wrote a song for Ahsan Watts which helped him get signed to Interscope, and gave Hyman recognition as a songwriter. She subsequently landed a publishing deal at Universal Music Publishing Group and went on to write songs with Alicia Keys, Diddy, Kanye West and Kelly Rowland.

=== Single release and EP ===
Hyman's first single, "Subway Art", was released on March 3, 2015, with a music video premiering on The Fader on April 27, 2015. The song, which describes the struggles of those who use the New York City subway trains on a daily basis, brought stylistic and vocal comparisons to Lauryn Hill. Her second single, "Home For Christmas", premiered on Vibe and on Ebro Darden's radio show on December 15, 2015.

She was featured on Fabolous's 2015 single You Made Me and on Dom Kennedy's 2015 single "2 Bad". She was the first female rapper in 2015 to successfully complete the "5 Fingers of Death" freestyle challenge on Sway in the Morning on SiriusXM. She wrote Ty Dolla Sign's "Horses in the Stable" off his 2015 album Free TC.

Hyman's debut EP, Dedicated To, was released on July 12, 2016, with production by Bink, William Larsen, Timothy Bloom, Dave Kuncio, Nate Walka and others.

=== Touring ===
She opened for Jill Scott on the US leg of her 2015 tour.

== Personal life ==
Hyman is a lesbian.

On November 2, 2025, Hyman was involved in an altercation with a transgender woman in the locker room of a Gold's Gym, who alleged that Hyman had harassed her several times prior. Following the incident, Hyman's membership to the gym was revoked. She later called for a boycott of Gold's Gym, stating that she had been harassed by multiple trans women at the gym and that "I feel like I'm being punished for not wanting to be naked in front of men in the restroom".

On 16 January 2026, Hyman declared her candidacy in the 2026 Los Angeles mayoral election, with banning trans women from women's locker rooms being the central plank of her political platform. Hyman was eliminated in the primary election, placing 12th out of 14 candidates.

== Discography ==
=== Extended plays ===
Title	Album details
Dedicated To:	Released: July 12, 2016; Formats: Digital download; Label: Listen2Tish; Empire

=== Singles ===
- "Subway Art" (March 15, 2015)
- "Home For Christmas" (December 12, 2015)
- "What It Feels Like" - Feat.Ty Dolla $ign & Dej Loaf (April 7, 2017)
- "No Strings" - Feat. 24hrs (July 2, 2018)
- "Summer Time" - Feat. Kill Nigel (August 13, 2018)
- "Bad Vibes" (December 6, 2025)

=== Appears on ===
- "6AM" – Gorgon City feat. Tish Hyman, from Sirens (Priority Records, October 7, 2014)
- "You Made Me" – Fabolous feat. Tish Hyman, from The Young OG Project (Def Jam Recordings, December 25, 2014)
- "2 Bad" – Dom Kennedy feat. Tish Hyman, from By Dom Kennedy (The Other People's Money Company, June 9, 2015)
- "Fly By Night" – Broiler feat. Tish Hyman (Casablanca, August 14, 2015)
- "Everyday (Amor)" – Puff Daddy feat. Jadakiss, Styles P, Pusha T & Tish Hyman, from MMM (Bady Boy/Epic, December 18, 2015)
- "Gotta Find Love" – Marley Waters feat. Tish Hyman, from Transitions (Marley Waters Productions, June 10, 2016)
- "Streets" - Black Thought and Salaam Remix feat. Tish Hyman, from Streams of Thought, Vol. 2
- "Taboo" - Denzel Curry, from TA13OO
- "Dream Went Bad" - Childish Major feat. Tish Hyman, from Dirt Road Diamond
- "The Light" - The Game, from Born 2 Rap
- "Feel It (You Got It)" - The Roots feat. Tish Hyman
- "Your Turn" - Ty Dolla Sign feat. Musiq Soulchild, Tish Hyman and 6lack, from Featuring Ty Dolla Sign (2020)
- "Something" - Movie Night, Tish Hyman (2023)

== Filmography ==
Year	Title	Role	Notes
2015	Chi-Raq	Big Thelma	Credited as Latisha Hyman
