= Ahsan =

Ahsan is a male name coming from the Arabic and Sanskrit.

In Arabic, triconsonantal root Ḥ-S-N, also as the diminutive of Hassan.

In Sanskrit, the name means gratitude.

== Ahsan ==
Given name

- Ahsan Ayaz (born 1998), Pakistani squash player
- Ahsan Iqbal (born 1959), Pakistani politician
- Ahsan Khan (actor) (born 1981), Pakistani actor
- Ahsan Malik (born 1948), Pakistani commander
- Ahsan Raza (born 1974), Pakistani first class cricketer
- Ahsan Watts (born 1999), teenage soul and R&B singer from Newark, New Jersey
- Ahsanullah Khan Bahadur (1846–1901), nawab of Dhaka
- Ahsan Ali (disambiguation)

Surname

- Aitzaz Ahsan (born 1945), Pakistani barrister and politician
- Haseeb Ahsan (1939–2013), Pakistani first class cricketer
- Jaya Ahsan, Bangladeshi actress and producer
- Jeetu Ahsan (born 1977), Bangladeshi actor
- Md. Razib Ahsan, Bangladeshi politician
- Saleyha Ahsan, British medical doctor, presenter and journalist
- S. M. Ahsan (1920–1989), Pakistan Navy Vice Admiral and Governor of East Pakistan

== Ahasan ==
Surname

- ASM Lutful Ahasan, Bangladeshi academic
- FRM Nazmul Ahasan (1955–2022), Bangladeshi lawyer
