= Class of 95 =

2024 studio album by Dom Kennedy

Studio album by Dom Kennedy
- Released: October 11, 2024
- Genre: Hip-hop
- Length: 62:52
- Label: The Other People's Money Company
- Producer: Polyseter the Saint; TROY NōKA; Tre Fresh; Al B Smoov; Big Duke

Dom Kennedy chronology
I Love Stocker (2023)	Class of 95 (2024)

Class of 95 is the tenth studio album by American rapper Dom Kennedy, released on October 11, 2024, by his independent label, The Other People's Money Company. The album's features include Troy NōKA, Polyester the Saint, Niko G4, Talk2Strangers, Indica, and Allyn.

== Background and release ==
Dom Kennedy released his collaborative studio album I Love Stocker with TeeFlii on June 23, 2023, with their last collaboration being on TeeFlii's self-titled EP in 2019. He also contributed to rapper Jay 305 and Hit-Boy's Don't Wait Until I Die the next year on May 18. Kennedy later attended as a guest on Kendrick Lamar's The Pop Out: Ken & Friends concert on June 19. In September he was also chosen by Verizon to host a free concert for fans in Los Angeles as part of their Verizon Speakeasy Concert Series with Complex, later releasing Class of 95 the next month on October 11, 2024, by his independent label The Other People's Money Company.

== Music ==
Class of 95 is a 19-track album spanning one hour. According to Steve Juon of RapReviews, Kennedy takes a straightforward approach to rapping, avoiding singing, crooning, or Auto-Tune with a vocal pitch between Kendrick Lamar and Suga Free. The album emphasizes Kennedy's ability to tell stories and paint vivid pictures with his lyrics and uplifting words. Shawnee Dez of the Chicago Reader summarized it as "a 19-track project that shows off his word-painting lyrical reveries over melodious beats". Kennedy's confident and laid-back delivery, frequently referencing his roots in Leimert Park, remains central throughout the album with other themes of self-assurance, independence, and authenticity.

== Critical reception ==
Professional ratings
Review scores
Source	Rating
RapReviews	8.5/10

Class of 95 received generally positive reviews from critics. Mya Singleton of Yardbarker highlighted the album's continuity with Kennedy's established style, writing that "fans can be sure that the Los Angeles rapper is giving laid-back and smooth production with a West Coast style that fits his flow, cadence, and storytelling skills perfectly." Steve Juon of RapReviews gave Class of 95 a positive review, describing it as "an incredibly solid hour of music". Juon acknowledges that calling an album Class of 95 "builds up expectations going in", due to the many classic hip-hop albums from 1995 that the title references. While he stops short of declaring that the album is better to those classics, he expresses that it is "worthy of the peers its title references" and can "go in rotation with them and not be automatically skipped". Juon concluded in his review: "Mr. Hunn is exactly what I want—a rapper who is good at rapping and has something to say when he raps." Both Singleton and Juon ranked it among the best hip-hop albums of 2024, with Singleton placing it at number 19 on her list and Juon at number four on his.

Select year-end rankings for Class of 95
Publication/critic	List	Rank	Ref.
RapReviews	Year 2024 in Review	4	
Yardbarker	The best hip-hop albums of 2024	19	

== Track listing ==
All tracks are written by Dominic Hunn except where noted.

Class of 95 track listing
No.	Title	Writer(s)	Producer(s)	Length
1.	"Rich Kids"		Polyester the Saint	2:30
2.	"Leanin"		Polyester the Saint	3:12
3.	"Legendary"		Tre Fresh	3:30
4.	"Casablanca" (featuring TROY NōKA and Polyester the Saint)	Hunn; TROY NōKA; Polyester the Saint	TROY NōKA and Polyester the Saint	3:22
5.	"Slauson Phil"		Al B Smoov	3:11
6.	"Nowornever" (featuring TROY NōKA)	Hunn; TROY NōKA	Polyester the Saint	3:09
7.	"Attention" (featuring Allyn)	Hunn; Allyn	Polyester the Saint	4:22
8.	"Baby James Intermission"		Polyester the Saint	3:19
9.	"Miracle on 43rd"		Polyester the Saint	4:45
10.	"Rollin"		TROY NōKA; Polyester the Saint	3:27
11.	"Celine"		Polyester the Saint	3:34
12.	"Independent" (featuring Allyn)	Hunn; Allyn	Polyester the Saint	2:55
13.	"Loved"		Big Duke	2:32
14.	"Promise" (featuring Niko G4 and Indica)	Hunn; Niko G4; Indica	Tre Fresh	4:03
15.	"Emergency" (featuring Talk2Strangers)	Hunn; Talk2Strangers	Polyester the Saint	2:15
16.	"Gallery"		Big Duke	3:24
17.	"Lonely Hearts" (featuring Talk2Strangers)	Hunn; Talk2Strangers	Polyester the Saint	3:18
18.	"Class of 95"		Polyester the Saint	2:30
19.	"Sketches from Westlake"		TROY NōKA; Polyester the Saint; Big Duke	3:34
Total length:				62:52
