= By Dom Kennedy =

Studio album by Dom Kennedy
- Released: June 2, 2015
- Recorded: 2014–15
- Genre: Hip hop
- Length: 36:11
- Label: The Other Peoples Money Company
- Producers: Dom Kennedy (exec.); Archie Davis (exec.); Jake One; Swiss Hunger; Sky Scrapa; K. Fischer; Yori; DJ Dahi; J. LBS; LDB; Mike & Keys; Darius Willrich

Dom Kennedy chronology
Get Home Safely (2013)	By Dom Kennedy (2015)	Los Angeles Is Not For Sale, Vol. 1 (2016)

Professional ratings
Review scores
Source	Rating
laut.de	3/5 stars

By Dom Kennedy is the third studio album by American rapper Dom Kennedy. The album was released on June 2, 2015. The album features the lone guest appearance from Bonic of Philly's Most Wanted.

== Commercial performance ==
The album debuted at number 23 on the Billboard 200, selling 9,000 copies.

== Track listing ==
No.	Title	Producer(s)	Length
1.	"Daddy"	Jake One; Swiss Hunger	2:36
2.	"My First Reply (Till It's Over)"	K.Fischer; Yori	3:13
3.	"On My Hometown / Nobody Else"	J. LBS	4:10
4.	"Represent (I Like That)"	J. LBS	3:25
5.	"What I Tell Kids"	Jake One; Skyscrapa	1:56
6.	"Fried Lobster" (featuring Bonic)	DJ Dahi	2:49
7.	"Thank You Biggie"	Jake One; Darius Willrich	2:29
8.	"Lemonade"	LDB	3:13
9.	"2Bad"	Mike & Keys	3:42
10.	"Alhambra"	DJ Dahi	3:52
11.	"Posted in the Club (Extended)"	LDB	4:46

Notes

- "What I Tell Kids" features additional vocals from Bonic
- "2Bad" features additional vocals from Tish Hyman

== Charts ==
=== Weekly charts ===
Chart (2015)	Peak position
US Billboard 200	23
US Top R&B/Hip-Hop Albums (Billboard)	3
US Independent Albums (Billboard)	1

=== Year-end charts ===
Chart (2015)	Position
US Top R&B/Hip-Hop Albums (Billboard)	100
