= Super Pack =

Compilation album by Fly Union
- Released: April 20, 2010
- Genre: Hip Hop
- Length: 1:25:03
- Labels: Fly Union Records; The Greater Than Club
- Producer: Fly Union

Fly Union chronology
Value Pack 4 (2010)	Super Pack (2010)	Value Pack 5 (2010)

Singles from Super Pack
- 1. "Poed Up" Released: December 25, 2009; 2. "Like That" Released: February 1, 2010

Professional ratings
Review scores
Source	Rating
GoGoYoko	7.2/10 stars

Super Pack is a compilation album by hip hop group Fly Union. The album was released on April 20, 2010. The album compiles the first four installments of Fly Union's Value Pack series of EPs (Value Pack 1, Value Pack 2, Value Pack 3 and Value Pack 4) along with seven previously unreleased songs. The album features guest appearances from artists Big Sean, Curren$y, Dom Kennedy, and Willie the Kid.

== Track listing ==
No.	Title	Writer(s)	Length
1.	"Poed Up" (featuring Big Sean)	S. Anderson, I. Houpe, J. Smith, J. Tribune	3:39
2.	"Kill Em"	J. Smith	3:51
3.	"911"	I. Houpe, J. Tribune	2:45
4.	"Airplane" (featuring Curren$y)	S. Franklin, I. Houpe, J. Smith, J. Tribune	4:03
5.	"Roller Coaster"	I. Houpe, J. Smith, J. Tribune	3:22
6.	"Lil Super Star"	I. Houpe, J. Tribune	3:44
7.	"Bad"	J. Smith	2:25
8.	"Great" (featuring Willie the Kid)	I. Houpe, W. Jackson, J. Smith, J. Tribune	4:46
9.	"Parlay'N"	I. Houpe, J. Smith, J. Tribune	2:34
10.	"She Don't Know Me"	I. Houpe, J. Tribune	3:26
11.	"Atl"	I. Houpe, J. Smith,	3:17
12.	"Like That" (featuring Dom Kennedy)	D. Hunn, J. Smith	4:32
13.	"Hello"	I. Houpe, J. Tribune	4:54
14.	"Less is More"	J. Smith	3:57
15.	"All is Well" (featuring Afaliah)	Afaliah, J. Smith	3:33
16.	"Grind Like"	I. Houpe, J. Tribune	4:17
17.	"Getchu There"	I. Houpe, J. Smith, J. Tribune	4:37
18.	"When We"	I. Houpe, J. Smith, J. Tribune	3:50
19.	"Only One"	I. Houpe, J. Smith, J. Tribune	3:37
20.	"Feel My Face"	I. Houpe, J. Smith, J. Tribune	3:37
21.	"Coming to America"	J. Smith	4:09
22.	"Gold Chain (On Credit)" (featuring Rashad)	Rashad, J. Smith	3:18
23.	"Be the One (Remix)" (featuring Jack Peñate)	J. Peñate, J. Smith	2:57
24.	"Poed Up (Radio Edit)" (featuring Big Sean)	S. Anderson, I. Houpe, J. Smith, J. Tribune	3:30

== Notes ==
- "Like That" samples "Shiny & New" by Mayer Hawthorne.
