= WDNG Crshrs =

American hip hop group

- Origin: Atlanta, Georgia, U.S.
- Genres: Hip hop
- Years active: 2014–present
- Members: Quentin Miller; TheCoolisMac

WDNG Crshrs (a disemvoweling of "wedding crashers") are an American hip hop duo from Atlanta, Georgia consisting of Quentin Miller and Thaddeus "TheCoolisMac" Callaway. In 2015, they released the mixtapes UTDinfinity and CrshrsGotWings with producer Cardo. In 2021, they released their album U2DINFINITI.

== History ==
=== 2014–present: UTDinfinity and CrshrsGotWings ===
Before they met, Callaway was working with Nick Miles, a producer that Miller would begin to build a working chemistry as well, they were all working out of the same studios. One day, Miller heard Callaway's music and told him that with enough fine-tuning, he could really be on to something so he should be a fly on the wall in one of his sessions to learn and actually ended up making a song together. Miller offered Callaway to stay with him for about six months since he had an extra room. During these sixth months, miller focused on recording and crafting new music while Callaway fell in love with smoking marijuana and recording music videos. They also recorded music in 1317, which was the unit number of their friend Trice's apartment. It was also their gathering spot for them to hang out and have "real constructive meetings" with their college friends.

Callaway came up with the name "WDNG Crshrs" by being interested in the 2005 film Wedding Crashers. He also came up with the spelling. On February 14, 2015, WDNG Crshrs released their debut mixtape, UTDinfinity. The mixtape has no guest features and is entirely produced by Nick Miles. Cardo reached out to WDNG Crshrs on Instagram and told them he wanted to do a collaboration project called, CrshrsGotWings. That same day, he sent them many beats to their emails. On August 19, 2015, CrshrsGotWings was released. The mixtape has a sole appearance from Jay Dot Rain and production from Cardo, Yung Exclusive, and others.

In 2026, Miller collaborated with Kanye West on his Bully album, receiving writing credits on 12 of 20 tracks of the deluxe edition.

== Discography ==
=== Mixtapes ===
List of mixtapes and selected details
| Title | Album details |
|---|---|
| UTDinfinity | Released: February 14, 2015; Formats: Digital download |
| CrshrsGotWings (with Cardo) | Released: August 19, 2015; Formats: Digital download |
| CRSHMONT | Released: January 15, 2022; Formats: Digital download |

=== Singles ===
==== As lead artist ====
List of singles, showing year released and album name
| Title | Year | Album |
|---|---|---|
| "UTDinfinity." | 2014 | UTDinfinity |
| "N O S H O R T S" | 2014 | Non-album single |
| "#SERVE" | 2015 | UTDinfinity |
| "Still" (featuring Jace) | 2015 | Non-album singles |
| "That's a Fool" | 2015 | Non-album singles |
| "Perfect Timing" | 2015 | CrshrsGotWings |
| "YaBwai" | 2015 | Non-album singles |
| "Fini..." | 2015 | Non-album singles |
| "Q.T. | 2015 | Non-album singles |
| "63/WDNG" (featuring Jay Dot Rain) | 2015 | Non-album singles |
| "Work Off" (featuring Jay Dot Rain) | 2016 | Non-album singles |
| "Play 2 Win" | 2016 | Non-album singles |
| "Both (featuring ManMan Savage) | 2016 | Non-album singles |
| "Thirst" | 2016 | Non-album singles |
| "Dreams Come True" | 2016 | Non-album singles |

=== Guest appearances ===
List of non-single guest appearances, with other performing artists, showing year released and album name
| Title | Year | Other artist(s) | Album |
|---|---|---|---|
| "Go Ahead (Boo Boo Kitty)" | 2015 | Timbaland, Goldy, Cynthia | King Stays King |
| "Audible" | 2016 | DJ Drama | Quality Street Music 2 |
| "Don't Walk Away" | 2021 | Dom Kennedy | From the Westside with Love Three |

=== Music videos ===
==== As lead artist ====
List of music videos as a lead artist, showing year released and director
| Title | Year | Director(s) |
|---|---|---|
| "WHTYOUBOUT" | 2015 | —N/a |
| "Combination" | 2015 | Jack Begert |
| "#SERVE" | 2015 | Fresh Start Productions |
| "63/WDNG" (featuring Jay Dot Rain) | 2015 | WDNG Crshrs |
| "Both" (featuring ManMan Savage) | 2016 | DJ Bluetooth |
