= TGTC (The Greater Than Club) =

Studio album by Fly Union
- Released: April 26, 2011
- Recorded: 2010–2011
- Genre: Hip hop, neo soul
- Length: 56:17
- Label: Fly Union Records; Hype Music; The Greater Than Club
- Producer: B Jazz, Ivan "Iyeball" Hope (exec.), Jonathan "Jay Swifa" Tribune (also exec.), Jerreau Smith (also exec.)

Fly Union chronology
Value Pack 6 (2010)	TGTC (The Greater Than Club) (2011)	Until Forever (2011)

Singles from TGTC (The Greater Than Club)
- 1. "Long Run" Released: December 24th, 2010; 2. "Hard Sell" Released: May 15th, 2011; 3. "Don't Call" Released: August 30th, 2011; 4. "5000" Released: February 4th, 2012

Professional ratings
Review scores
Source	Rating
XXL	(L)
Atlanta Got Sole	8.5/10 stars
Vegas Seven	3/5 stars

TGTC (The Greater Than Club) is the debut studio album by rap group Fly Union. The album was released on iTunes and as a free digital download through their website on April 26, 2011 Since the album's initial release, it has been licensed through Hype Music. A digital copy of TGTC is currently available for purchase on iTunes and Amazon. A physical copy of the album is also available for purchase on Fly Union's website. To date, the album has generated over 100,000 downloads.

== Background ==
On December 24, 2010, an official music video for "Long Run" was uploaded to Fly Union's YouTube channel. On that same day, it was announced that they would be releasing a project titled The Greater Than Club in the first quarter of 2011.

== Music and lyrics ==
TGTC has a lush sound that is characterized by luxuriant strings, brisk snare drums, and soulful samples. The album's production, mainly provided by Iyeball and Jay Swifa (MnkeyWrench), incorporates elements of various music styles including electronic, hip hop and soul. Adam Fleischer of XXL described the album as having a "Midwest soul hop" sound.

Lyrically, TGTC explores a variety of topics. In the song "Salutation" each individual group member addresses their shortcomings and anxieties through lyrics that carry an uncommon sense of honesty. In "Don't Call", Jerreau speaks on the intricacies and complications of dating. In "5000" the group speaks on being “Audi” (as in the Audi 5000), while defining the term as being well-off.

== Promotion ==
On February 16, 2012, the official music video for "5000" was uploaded to KarmaloopTV's YouTube channel.

On August 1, 2012, the official music videos for "Long Run" and "Don't Call" were featured on MTV.

On January 17, 2013, "Friends.Women.Money" was featured on an episode of the MTV series Buckwild.

On July 27, 2013, the NBA 2K team announced that "Long Run" would be featured on the soundtrack to NBA 2K14.

== Critical response ==
TGTC was generally well received by music critics. It holds a rating of 3.32 out of 5 stars at Rate Your Music. XXL gave it a L rating citing that the album is "a little lengthy", but ultimately declaring that it is "a fine formal introduction" for the group. Atlanta Got Soul gave it 8.5 out of 10 making note of the album's production and "splendid lyricism." The Smoking Section also gave the album a positive review citing that the album was, "well-produced and thoughtfully written."

== Track listing ==
No.	Title	Writer(s)	Producer(s)	Length
1.	"Salutation"	I. Houpe, J. Smith, J. Tribune	Iyeball	3:14
2.	"Hard Sell"	I. Houpe, J. Smith, J. Tribune	Iyeball	3:35
3.	"Good To Go"	I. Houpe, J. Smith, J. Tribune	Jay Swifa	4:03
4.	"5000"	I. Houpe, J. Smith, J. Tribune	Jay Swifa, Iyeball (co.)	3:53
5.	"Finish Line"	I. Houpe, G. Robinson, J. Smith, J. Tribune	Iyeball, Jay Swifa	3:36
6.	"Long Run"	I. Houpe, J. Smith, J. Tribune	Jay Swifa	4:17
7.	"Love For You"	J. Smith	Jay Swifa, B Jazz (add.)	3:22
8.	"How To Act"	R. James, J. Smith	Jay Swifa	1:07
9.	"Friends.Women.Money" (featuring Dom Kennedy)	D. Hunn, J. Smith, J. Tribune	Jay Swifa	3:29
10.	"Control"	I. Houpe, J. Smith, J. Tribune	Iyeball, Jay Swifa	3:11
11.	"Don't Call"	J. Smith	Iyeball	3:47
12.	"Look Up To The Sky" (featuring BJ the Chicago Kid & P. Blackk)	P. Fequiere, I. Houpe, B. Sledge, J. Smith	Iyeball	5:00
13.	"Do It For You" (featuring BJ the Chicago Kid & Pac Div)	B. Sledge, J. Smith, G. Stevenson, M. Stevenson, J. Tribune	Jay Swifa, B Jazz (add.)	5:26
14.	"Who You Wit"	I. Houpe, J. Smith, J. Tribune	Iyeball, B Jazz (add.)	5:16
15.	"Sincerely"		Iyeball, Jay Swifa	3:01

== Notes ==
- "Finish Line" samples "Bumpy's Lament" by Isaac Hayes.
- "Long Run" samples "We've Only Just Begun" by The Carpenters.
- "Who You Wit" samples "Action" by Orange Krush.

== Personnel ==
Credits for TGTC adapted from Allmusic and Atlanta Got Sole.

- Ivan "Iyeball" Houpe – A&R, executive producer, vocalist, producer, mixing, recording
- Jerreau Smith - A&R, executive producer, vocalist
- Jonathan "Jay Swifa" Tribune - A&R, executive producer, vocalist, producer
- B Jazz - producer
- Eddie "Duck" Givens - management
- SLAVEFORYOURSELF - art direction, styling, photography
- Bryan "BJ the Chicago Kid" Sledge - vocalist
- Pedro "P. Blackk" Fequiere - vocalist
- Dominic "Dom Kennedy" Hunn - vocalist
- Michael "Mibbs" Stevenson - vocalist
- Gabe "Like" Stevenson - vocalist
- Cataylst - vocalist
