= Until Forever =

EP by MnkeyWrench
- Released: August 1, 2011
- Genre: Hip hop
- Length: 23:31
- Labels: Fly Union Records; Hype Music; The Greater Than Club
- Producer: Fly Union

MnkeyWrench chronology
| TGTC (The Greater Than Club) (2010) | Until Forever (2011) | Value Pack 7 (Zenith) (2012) |

Professional ratings
Review scores
| Source | Rating |
|---|---|
| AllMusic | 3.5/5 stars |

Until Forever is the debut EP by rap/production duo MnkeyWrench. The EP was released as a free download on August 1, 2011. A digital copy of Until Forever is currently available for purchase on iTunes and Amazon.

== Track listing ==
| No. | Title | Writer(s) | Length |
|---|---|---|---|
| 1. | "Satellite" | I. Houpe, J. Tribune | 1:55 |
| 2. | "Lights Out" | I. Houpe, J. Tribune | 3:19 |
| 3. | "Get Away" (featuring B. Wilks) | I. Houpe, J. Tribune, B. Wilks | 4:23 |
| 4. | "Outer Space" | I. Houpe, J. Tribune | 2:51 |
| 5. | "Dreams/Willing (Interlude)" | I. Houpe, J. Tribune | 4:06 |
| 6. | "Man Down" | I. Houpe, J. Tribune | 3:45 |
| 7. | "Pretty Face" | I. Houpe, J. Tribune | 3:12 |
