= Vada Azeem =

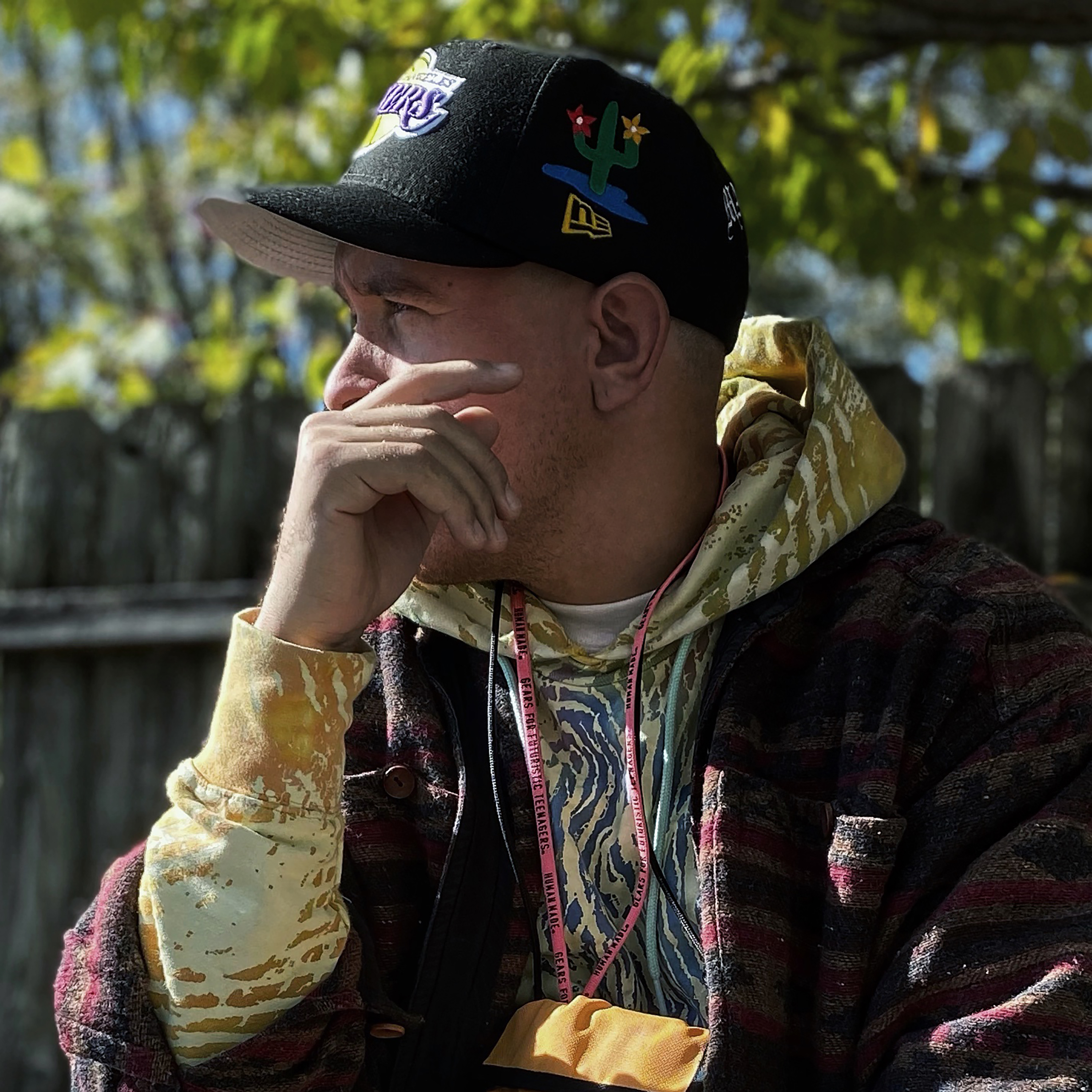
- Azeem in 2020

Background information
- Born: Philadelphia, PA
- Genres: Hip Hop
- Occupations: Rapper, creator
- Formerly of: Fly Union
- Spouse: Ababa Azeem (married 2019–present)

Vada Leon Azeem is a rapper and visual creator based in Columbus, Ohio.

== Early life ==
In his early years, Azeem spent time in his mother’s hometown of Philadelphia, Pennsylvania. From age six to eight-years-old, he lived with family members in Maybeury, West Virginia before his parents decided to finally settled in Columbus, Ohio. He is of African-American, Haitian, and Irish descent.

== Music ==
Azeem named and co-founded the hip-hop collective Fly.Union. In 2008 the collective released a mixtape with DJ Mick Boogie titled "Closed Doors, Open Windows" which lead to the group signing a publishing deal with Maverick Carter and NBA All-Star LeBron James' SpringHill imprint. Azeem parted ways with the collective soon after signing the deal.

As a solo artist, Azeem would gain further notoriety by appearing with artist such as Stalley, Curren$y, and Rick Ross at Atlanta's A3C Festival, New York City's CMJ Festival, and Austin’s SxSW Festival.

There is lore around Azeem presenting a long awaited album titled “We Forgot That God Was Watching.” It would be his first full-length musical offering since 2013.

== Personal life ==
Azeem is a Sunni muslim. He is married with two children.
