= This D =

Single by TeeFlii and DJ Mustard

from the album AnNieRuO'TAY 1
- Released: October 2, 2013
- Recorded: 2012
- Genre: R&B; hip hop
- Length: 2:07
- Label: Excuse My Liquor; Epic Records
- Songwriters: Christian Jones; Dijon McFarlane
- Producer: DJ Mustard

TeeFlii singles chronology
"This D" (2013)	"24 Hours" (2014)

DJ Mustard singles chronology
"Throw It Up" (2013)	"This D" (2013)	"Feelin' Myself" (2013)

"This D" is a song by American singer TeeFlii from his first official mixtape AnNieRuO'TAY 1. The song was released on October 2, 2013, by Excuse My Liquor and Epic Records as his debut single. It was produced by frequent collaborator DJ Mustard. After receiving a high amount of radio airplay, the song peaked at number 35 on the US Billboard Rhythmic chart.

== Background ==
The song was originally released in November 2012 as a part of TeeFlii's first official mixtape AnNieRuO'TAY 1. On July 4, 2013, DJ Mustard and TeeFlii released a collaboration mixtape titled Fireworks. It was entirely produced by DJ Mustard and featured collaborations with Dom Kennedy, Casey Veggies, Ty Dolla Sign, Omarion, Kevin McCall, and E-40.

== Commercial performance ==
On September 20, 2013, "This D" debuted on the US Billboard Rhythmic chart at number 38. It received serious support on hometown Power 106, being played nearly 800 times during the previous week. The song would end up peaking at number 35 on that chart.

== Music video ==
On July 16, 2013, Vice premiered the song's music video, also praising TeeFlii as Los Angeles' best R&B singer. The video was directed by Topshelf Junior.

== Remix ==
On July 16, 2013, The Game released a freestyle to "This D". On September 6, 2013, a remix featuring Jadakiss was premiered online. The day after the song's retail release, on October 3, 2013, the song's official remix featuring Tyga and Jadakiss was released. The remix was then serviced to DJ's as a promotional single.

== Chart performance ==
Chart (2013)	Peak position
US Rhythmic Airplay (Billboard)	35

== Release history ==
Country	Date	Format	Label
United States	October 2, 2013	Digital download	Excuse My Liquor; Epic Records
