= Fly Union =

American hip hop group

- Also known as: Fly Dot U
- Origin: Columbus, Ohio
- Genres: Hip hop
- Occupations: Record producers; rapper
- Instruments: Vocals
- Years active: 2007–2015
- Labels: Fly Union Records; Hype Music; The Greater Than Club
- Members: Iyeball; Jay Swifa; Jerreau
- Website: flydotu.com

Fly Union (sometimes stylized as Fly.Union) were an American hip hop group from Columbus, Ohio. The group consists of production duo MnkeyWrench (Iyeball and Jay Swifa) and rapper Jerreau. Rapper Vada Azeem was also a founder and member of the collective before leaving the group in 2008. They are most notable for their debut studio album, TGTC (The Greater Than Club), which reached the number one spot on iTunes' New Hip Hop chart in 2011.

== Career ==
Fly Union has worked with popular artists such as Big Sean, Casey Veggies, Chip Tha Ripper, Curren$y, Dom Kennedy, Kendrick Lamar, Naledge, Pusha T, Schoolboy Q, Talib Kweli, and Willie the Kid.

In 2012, Fly Union was one of the artists featured in BET's Music Matters Tour.

== Recognition ==
On December 11, 2012, Fly Union was featured on XXL's We Got Next.

On July 27, 2013, it was announced that the song "Long Run" would be featured on the soundtrack to NBA 2K14.

== Discography ==
=== Studio albums ===
- TGTC (The Greater Than Club) (2011)
- Small Victories (2014)

=== Extended plays ===
- Until Forever (2011)

=== Mixtapes ===
- Value Pack 1 (2009)
- Value Pack 2 (2009)
- Value Pack 3 (2009)
- Value Pack 4 (2010)
- Value Pack 5 (2010)
- Value Pack 6 (2010)
- Value Pack 7: Zenith (2012)

=== Compilations ===
- Super Pack (2010)
- Super Pack 2 (2013)

== Production discography ==
=== 2010 ===
Naledge – Twenty Something

- 20. "Never Over (Remix)"

=== 2011 ===
Currensy - Jet Files
06. "Stay Up" (featuring Fly Union)

=== 2012 ===
Casey Veggies – Customized Greatly Vol. 3

- 07. "When You See The Kid"

Dom Kennedy – Yellow Album
02. "Been Thuggin"

Pusha T –

- "Pies"
