= Los Angeles Is Not For Sale, Vol. 1 =

Studio album by Dom Kennedy
- Released: December 23, 2016
- Recorded: 2014–15
- Genre: West Coast hip hop; lo-fi
- Length: 54:31
- Label: The Other Peoples Money Company
- Producer: Dom Kennedy (exec.); Archie Davis (exec.); Aaron Reid; J. LBS; Polyester the Saint; Jake One; Drewbyrd; P-Lo; Mike Free; Cardo

Dom Kennedy chronology
By Dom Kennedy (2015)	Los Angeles Is Not For Sale, Vol. 1 (2016)	Los Angeles Is Not For Sale, Vol. 2 (2018)

Los Angeles Is Not For Sale, Vol. 1 is the fourth studio album by Los Angeles rapper Dom Kennedy, released December 23, 2016 via his label, The Other People's Money Company. It is the first release of a planned two-piece project. The album features guest appearances from Ricky Hil, Niko G4, Troy Noka, Glasses Malone and P-Lo, while its production was handled by Aaron Reid, J.LBS, Polyester, Jake One, Cardo, Mike Free, and Drewbyrd.

The album received negative reviews and is considered one of Kennedy's weaker efforts. Despite this, its companion album, Los Angeles Is Not For Sale, Vol. 2, was released in 2018.

== Critical reception ==
Professional ratings
Review scores
Source	Rating
HotNewHipHop	2 stars on a 5 point scale

Los Angeles Is Not For Sale, Vol. 1 has received negative reviews from music critics and was overlooked by mainstream media publications. Jesse Fairfax of HipHopDX wrote, "Still stumbling over himself trying to find inspiration and failing to reclaim his magic, Los Angeles Is Not For Sale extends Dom Kennedy’s artistic downward spiral for another year". In a review from TheFreshCommittee, Kennedy's lackluster rhymes and offbeat ramblings were criticized.

== Commercial performance ==
Unlike its predecessor, the album failed to chart in the Billboard 200 and accurate sales information are unavailable.

== Track listing ==
No.	Title	Producer(s)	Length
1.	"Let The Money Burn"	J. LBS	4:28
2.	"TPO"	Polyester the Saint	3:04
3.	"Dominic, Pt. 2"	J. LBS	3:04
4.	"In Other Words" (featuring Troy Noka)	J. LBS	4:17
5.	"Everywhere I Go" (featuring Niko G4 & Ricky Hil)	Aaron Reid	3:14
6.	"California"	Polyester the Saint	3:32
7.	"The 76"	J. LBS	4:18
8.	"96 Cris"	Jake One	3:08
9.	"When I Missing You"	J. LBS	3:58
10.	"Since We're Telling the Truth"	Drewbyrd	3:19
11.	"Passcode" (featuring P-Lo)	Polyester the Saint; P-Lo ( co.)	4:02
12.	"We Still On Top" (additional vocals by Glasses Malone)	J. LBS	5:06
13.	"U Got It Like That" (featuring Niko G4)	Mike Free	3:02
14.	"Johnny Bench"	Mike Free	3:28
15.	"323 Go Crazy"	Cardo	2:48

== Charts ==
Chart (2016)	Peak position
US Top R&B/Hip-Hop Albums (Billboard)	42
US Independent Albums (Billboard)	23
