= From the Westside with Love Three =

2021 studio album by Dom Kennedy

Studio album by Dom Kennedy
- Released: October 15, 2021
- Recorded: 2020–2021
- Genres: Hip hop; West Coast hip hop
- Length: 42:20
- Label: The Other People's Money Company
- Producers: 88ThaGang; Fresh Chuck; G-Dav; Hit-Boy; John Groover; Juicy Smoove; Mike & Keys; MyGuyMars; Nabeyin; Oh Gosh Leotus; Sticky; Uce Lee

Dom Kennedy chronology
Rap N Roll (2020)	From the Westside with Love Three (2021)	I Love Stocker (2023)

Singles from From the Westside with Love Three
- 1. "Rollin Papers" Released: October 1, 2021

From the Westside with Love Three is the ninth studio album by American rapper Dom Kennedy. It was released on October 15, 2021, by The Other People's Money Company. The album's features include Quentin Miller, TeeFlii, Bryan Roberts, Frank$, Kay Franklin, MyGuyMars, and True Whitaker.

== Background and release ==
Dom Kennedy started working on the album in 2020, writing numerous songs on his own. He claims that his time spent working with Hit-Boy served as inspiration for the album's composition. Dom explained in an interview with Billboard:

"It wasn't nothing I planned out, honestly. I never thought about doing Westside with Love Three until about a year and a half ago. I was working with Hit Boy real heavy. We was working on some joint music together, then I started making solo songs again, and they had a certain feeling to them. I just started working on it quietly for six, eight months before I even told anybody what I was working on. It was inspired by working with Hit-Boy and making music that I felt put me back in that same mindset that I had when I made the first one. It just felt authentic. It wasn't forced. That was the spirit I was in, so I just embraced it, honestly."

On March 26, 2021, Dom Kennedy announced that he was making From the Westside with Love Three. "When I decided to release the first From the Westside with Love in March 2010, I wanted to prove to myself that I could make a body of work that would reach way beyond just my neighborhood in Los Angeles", he wrote on Instagram. "It was a gut check for me to show my love for the genre of rap and what I could possibly bring to it." He later revealed that the album would be released on October 15, 2021.

Dom gradually posted three different album covers for From the Westside with Love Three on his Instagram account, used to promote the album. None of them were used for the official album cover when the album was released.

== Critical reception ==
The album received generally positive reviews from music critics. Kwasi Boadi of Billboard praised the album, saying, "The storytelling is just as vivid, and the production still sounds tailor-made for a sunny drive down La Cienega Boulevard. Still, everything feels more polished, and Dom's commentary is noticeably sharper." RespectMyRegion's Lucas Bruce called the album "very consistent with production that would make any record an instant classic."

== Track listing ==
Credits adapted from Tidal and album's back cover.

From the Westside with Love Three track listing
No.	Title	Writer(s)	Producer(s)	Length
1.	"Still Grind'n"	Dominic Hunn	Hit-Boy	3:04
2.	"Don't Walk Away" (featuring Quentin Miller)	Dominic Hunn; Quentin Miller	Hit-Boy	2:27
3.	"On the Run"	Dominic Hunn	Fresh Chuck	3:24
4.	"Valet"	Dominic Hunn	88ThaGang	2:11
5.	"Good Lookin"	Dominic Hunn	Hit-Boy	2:19
6.	"Hypnotized" (featuring Bryan Roberts)	Dominic Hunn; Bryan Roberts	John Groover	2:33
7.	"Never Fold Intermission" (featuring TeeFlii)	Dominic Hunn; Christian Jones	Nabeyin; Juicy Smoove	3:25
8.	"Lax" (featuring Frank$)	Dominic Hunn; Frank$	Mike & Keys	3:41
9.	"The Other Side"	Dominic Hunn	Nabeyin; Oh Gosh Leotus	3:07
10.	"Star Baby"	Dominic Hunn	Uce Lee	3:12
11.	"Deep Thought" (featuring Kay Franklin and MyGuyMars)	Dominic Hunn; Kay Franklin; Lamar Edwards	Mike & Keys; MyGuyMars	2:51
12.	"From the Westside With Love"	Dominic Hunn	Uce Lee	2:28
13.	"Rollin Papers"	Dominic Hunn	G-Dav	3:17
14.	"Come Home" (featuring True Whitaker)	Dominic Hunn; True Whitaker	Sticky	2:29
15.	"Love You More" (Outro)	Dominic Hunn	Mike & Keys	1:52
Total length:				42:20

Sample credits

- "Don't Walk Away" contains a sample of "Don't Walk Away", performed by DJ Quik and Suga Free.
- "From the Westside with Love" contains a sample of "The Last Kiss", performed by Brian Simpson.

== Personnel ==
Credits for From the Westside with Love Three adapted from album's back cover.

- Dom Kennedy – vocals, executive producer
- Hit-Boy – executive producer
- Archie Davis – executive producer
- Mike & Keys – producer (track 6, 8, 11, 15)
- Uce Lee – producer (track 10, 12)
- Nabeyin – producer (track 7, 9)
- Juicy Smoove – producer (track 7)
- Fresh Chuck – producer (track 3)
- 88ThaGang – producer (track 4)
- Oh Gosh Leotus – producer (track 9)
- G-Dav – producer (track 13)
- Sticky – producer (track 14)
- Quentin Miller – vocals (track 2)
- TeeFlii – vocals (track 7)
- Bryan Roberts – vocals (track 6)
- Frank$ – vocals (track 8)
- Kay Franklin – vocals (track 11)
- MyGuyMars – vocals, producer (track 11)
- True Whitaker – vocals (track 14)
- David Kim – mixing (all tracks)
- Mike Reese – art director
- Double – A&R

== Release history ==
Release dates and formats for From the Westside with Love Three
Region	Date	Label(s)	Format(s)	Ref.
United States	October 15, 2021	The Other People's Money Company	Digital download	
