= 24 Hours (TeeFlii song) =

Single by TeeFlii featuring 2 Chainz

from the album Starr
- Released: May 12, 2014
- Recorded: 2013–2014
- Genre: Hip-hop; R&B
- Length: 3:35
- Label: Excuse My Liquor; Epic
- Songwriters: Christian Jones; Tauheed Epps; Dijon McFarlane; Marcus Sanders; Mark Pitts; William Anthony Anderson Jr.
- Producer: DJ Mustard

TeeFlii singles chronology
"This D" (2013)	"24 Hours" (2014)	"Do It To Ya" (2014)

2 Chainz singles chronology
"Only That Real" (2014)	"24 Hours" (2014)	"Drop Girl" (2014)

Music video
- "24 Hours" on YouTube

"24 Hours" is a song by American singer TeeFlii, released by Epic Records on May 12, 2014 as the lead single from his debut studio album, Starr. It features a guest appearance from American rapper 2 Chainz, while production was handled by frequent collaborator DJ Mustard.

== Remix ==
The song's official remix features new guest appearances by Ty Dolla Sign and Bobby Shmurda. Chris Brown and Trey Songz created their own remix to the song for their collaborative mixtape TRGAxBRZY.

== Music video ==
A music video for the track was released on May 29, 2014. It was directed by Colin Tilley.

== Chart performance ==
=== Weekly charts ===
Chart (2014)	Peak position
Germany (Deutsche Black Charts)	6
US Billboard Hot 100	85
US Hot R&B/Hip-Hop Songs (Billboard)	21
US Rhythmic Airplay (Billboard)	8

=== Year-end charts ===
Chart (2014)	position
US Hot R&B/Hip-Hop Songs (Billboard)	72
US Rhythmic (Billboard)	38

== Release history ==
Release dates and formats for "24 Hours"
Region	Date	Format	Label(s)	Ref.
United States	May 20, 2014	Mainstream airplay	Epic	
