= Super Pack 2 =

Compilation album by Fly Union
- Released: February 28, 2013
- Genre: Hip hop
- Length: 76:08
- Labels: Fly Union Records; The Greater Than Club
- Producer: Fly Union

Fly Union chronology
| Value Pack 7 (Zenith) (2012) | Super Pack 2 (2013) | Small Victories (2014) |

Singles from Super Pack 2
- 1. "Dreams BankReau Can Buy" Released: November 2, 2011; 2. "Gone" Released: November 16, 2011; 3. "The Hard Way" Released: April 6, 2012; 4. "Conflicted" Released: May 31, 2012

Professional ratings
Review scores
| Source | Rating |

Super Pack 2 is a compilation album by hip hop group Fly Union. The album was released on February 28, 2013. The album compiles three EPs from Fly Union's Value Pack EP series (Value Pack 5, Value Pack 6 and Value Pack 7 (Zenith)). The album features guest appearances from artists Chip tha Ripper, and GLC.

== Track listing ==
| No. | Title | Writer(s) | Length |
|---|---|---|---|
| 1. | "Tell Her" (featuring Chip tha Ripper) | J. Smith, J. Tribune, C. Worth | 4:19 |
| 2. | "We Out" | J. Smith, J. Tribune | 3:27 |
| 3. | "Go Dumb" (featuring B. Wilks) | I. Houpe, J. Tribune, B. Wilks | 2:21 |
| 4. | "Tonight" | J. Smith | 2:34 |
| 5. | "Winter Summer" | I. Houpe, J. Smith, J. Tribune | 3:20 |
| 6. | "Long Run" | I. Houpe, J. Smith, J. Tribune | 4:18 |
| 7. | "Good to Go" | I. Houpe, J. Smith, J. Tribune | 4:03 |
| 8. | "Feel Good" | I. Houpe, J. Smith, J. Tribune | 3:51 |
| 9. | "U Know Who You Are" | J. Smith | 4:16 |
| 10. | "Partner" | I. Houpe, J. Tribune | 2:22 |
| 11. | "The Hard Way" | I. Houpe, J. Smith, J. Tribune | 5:07 |
| 12. | "Gone" | I. Houpe, J. Smith, J. Tribune | 4:09 |
| 13. | "Nothing New" | I. Houpe, J. Smith, J. Tribune | 4:51 |
| 14. | "Cashing In" | I. Houpe, J. Smith, J. Tribune | 4:52 |
| 15. | "Seen This Before" (featuring GLC) | L. Harris, I. Houpe, J. Tribune | 4:40 |
| 16. | "Home With Me" | I. Houpe, J. Tribune | 3:17 |
| 17. | "What You Feel" | I. Houpe, J. Tribune | 3:33 |
| 18. | "Conflicted" | J. Smith | 3:36 |
| 19. | "Dreams BankReau Can Buy" | J. Smith | 3:26 |
| 20. | "Because It's Real" | I. Houpe, J. Smith | 3:46 |

== Notes ==
- "The Hard Way" contains a sample from "The Darkest Street" by Fitz and the Tantrums.
- "Conflicted" contains a sample from "The Magic of Your Love" by The Majestic Arrows.
