= Skeme =

American rapper (born 1990)

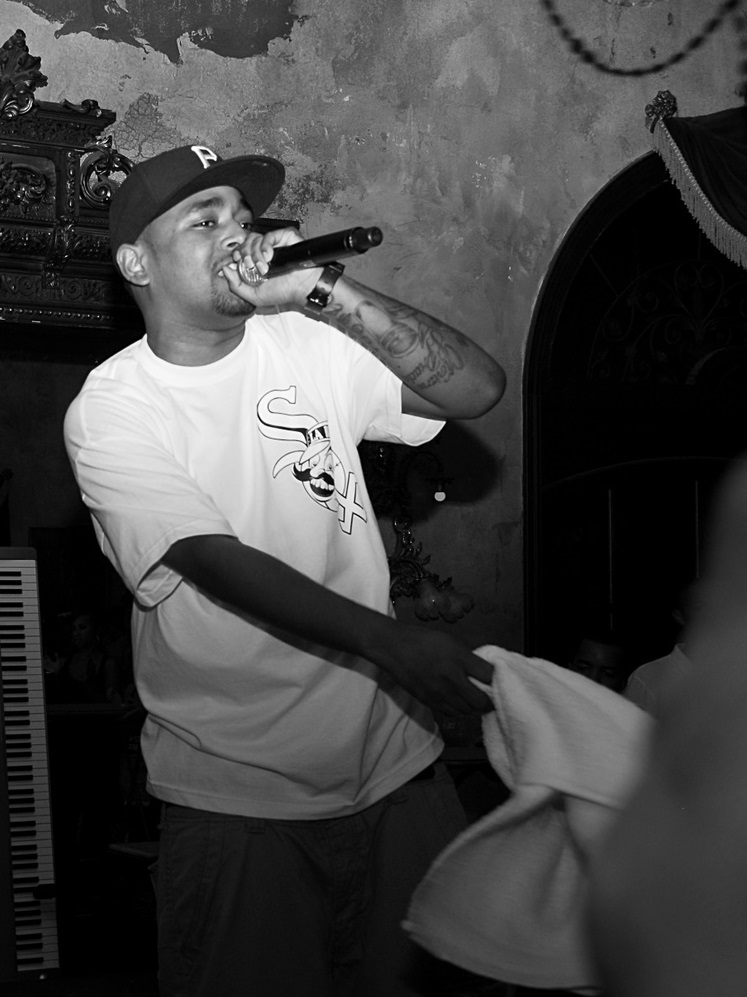
- Kimble performing in November 2010

Background information
- Also known as: Skeme
- Born: Lonnie Alphonso Kimble; January 3, 1990 (age 36); Inglewood, California, U.S.
- Genre: West Coast hip-hop
- Occupations: Rapper; songwriter
- Years active: 2004–present
- Labels: Generation Now; Blood Money; EMPIRE; MADE Headlines; E1; RBC; Diamond Lane
- Website: thegenerationnow.com/artists/skeme/

Lonnie Alphonso Kimble (born January 3, 1990), better known by his stage name Skeme, is an American rapper from Inglewood, California. In 2012, Skeme released his debut studio album Alive & Living under RBC Records, and his second studio album Ingleworld (2013), was released by MADE Headlines.

In July 2014, fellow West Coast rapper the Game announced that he had signed Skeme to Blood Money Entertainment. By 2016, Skeme parted ways with the label and signed with DJ Drama's Generation Now label, alongside frequent collaborator Lil Uzi Vert.

== Early life ==
Lonnie Kimble was born on January 3, 1990, into a musical family, his great uncle was bluesman Howlin' Wolf . His parents split when he was two years old and his father was in the military. As a result, he moved in with his grandmother in Inglewood, California. Once his father came into the picture at age 10, he started listening to hip hop and memorizing his favorite songs. His dad originally gave him the idea to come up with his own material and start rapping.

Skeme acquired his stage name at 13, when a friend noticed his craftiness at generating money. He said that most of his money-making strategies were illegal but they allowed him to purchase a BMW 525I while he was in the twelfth grade at Gardena's Junipero Serra High School. He grew up affiliated with the Piru Blood gang and was a gangbanger throughout his high school years.

== Career ==
=== 2007–2010: Early mixtapes and Pistols and Palm Trees ===
Skeme first began rapping around age 12 and began writing around age 15. He recorded his first song at a studio in Long Beach, California, at age 16. When he first began taking rapping seriously at age 17, he was graduating high school. He shortly after met Dolla, whom he began hanging out and frequently working with. He credits Dolla for significantly influencing him. He has said, "Dolla kind of molded me when I was young. He shaped me into being somebody and trying to tell me what could happen if you took this shit seriously." In 2007 he released Skeme Of Things, which was then followed by Skeme Of Things 2 in June 2009. On February 17, 2010, Skeme released his third official mixtape, All Rap'd Up, hosted by DJ Ill Will. During those early years, he forged friendships with Los Angeles-area rappers such as Kendrick Lamar, Nipsey Hussle and Dom Kennedy. On October 19, 2010, Skeme released his fourth official mixtape Pistols and Palm Trees. He recorded the entire mixtape at Top Dawg Entertainment's studio in Carson, California. It featured collaborations with Tyga, Ty Dolla Sign, Dom Kennedy and Kendrick Lamar. On the strength of that mixtape, Skeme begun building his buzz.

=== 2011–2013: The Statement and Alive and Living ===
On May 19, 2011, Skeme released his fifth mixtape The Statement. It featured collaborations with Casey Veggies and Dom Kennedy, with production by Boi-1da, Bink! and The Futuristiks, among others. Later that year, on November 29, Skeme released his sixth mixtape Before My Next Statement. With basketball player Baron Davis, Skeme started a Los Angeles-based entertainment management company named L.A. UNFD. Then he signed a one-album deal with RBC Records to release his debut studio album. On October 10, 2012, Skeme revealed that track listing for his debut album, titled Alive & Living. The album contained guest appearances by Iggy Azalea, Schoolboy Q, Kendrick Lamar, Dom Kennedy and Problem. The album's production was handled by Boi-1da, The Futuristiks, DJ Mustard, THC, and DJ Dahi. The album was then released digitally on October 16, 2012. It was supported by the singles "Ain't Bout Dat Life" and "Kidz With Gunz", the latter which featured Schoolboy Q.

In April 2013, Skeme told Bruce Smith of HipHopDX that he was in talks with Top Dawg Entertainment about signing to their record label. He commented on it saying, "It's yet to be seen where exactly I’m gonna go. I'm just trying to make the right move. The next move has to be the best one. [...] With that being said, I am very close to TDE, them is the homies, and we are in heavy talks. It could be something." He later stated that he chose not to sign to TDE, out of the concern he would get lost in the mix, or overshadowed, wanting instead to remain independent and build his brand more. Skeme also revealed that he had been in talks with Def Jam Recordings, Universal and Roc Nation about record deals during 2013. However, he stated that he was in no rush to sign to a major record label. He was featured on an October 2013 commercial for Colt 45 along with Snoop Dogg, YG, Snow Tha Product, and Lil Debbie.

=== 2013–2015: Ingleworld and first two sequels ===
On September 27, 2013, Skeme released his seventh mixtape Bare With Me. It featured guest appearances by The Game, Nipsey Hussle, Problem and TeeFlii. It was met with a positive review by HipHopDX. Bare With Me consisted of left over songs from Ingleworld, that either did not fit the theme of the album, or had sample clearance issues. Following its release, Skeme appeared on E-40's "Turn Up or Burn Up" from The Block Brochure: Welcome to the Soil 6 and on The Game's "Welcome to California" from OKE. Skeme toured in promotion of his second studio album, in the United States, along with internationally in countries such as the United Kingdom and Sweden.

On November 15, 2013, Skeme released the music video for "Millions" from Ingleworld. On November 26, 2013, Skeme revealed the cover artwork and the track listing for his second studio album Ingleworld. The track listing revealed that it would contain 15 songs, including guest appearances from Wale, Nipsey Hussle, Iggy Azalea and Dom Kennedy, with production handled by Boi-1da, Wizzo and Sean Momberger, among others. He explained that the album had a serious tone, which is why he choose to release it at the end of the calendar year. The album's lead single "Different" was released on December 4, 2013.

Ingleworld was released digitally by MADE Headlines on December 17, 2013. The album was met with generally positive reviews. Bruce Smith of HipHopDX said, "On Ingleworld, Skeme combines an array of styles and cadences and an unheralded but highly skilled production team to craft an album with charm and depth." Olivia Arezes of Exclaim! gave it a six out of ten saying, "Ingleworld is a valiant effort from Skeme but mediocre overall. Still, with some growth and improvement, Skeme could easily become a leader of the new West Coast sound." Following the release of the album, MTV called him one of "hip-hop's top prospects for 2014."

Starting January 23, 2014, Skeme begun touring with Dom Kennedy on the Get Home Safely tour, in promotion of Kennedy's album Get Home Safely that Skeme also made an appearance on. The tour ran through February 27, 2014. Skeme was nominated for the 2014 XXL freshman class, however he was not selected.

On July 14, 2014, The Game announced that Skeme had been signed to his Blood Money Entertainment Label. He released a collaboration with The Game titled "No Limit" after the announcement. He was featured heavily on the Blood Money Entertainment collaborative project released by The Game entitled Blood Moon: Year of the Wolf.

In 2015, Skeme worked heavily with DJ Drama and Don Cannon as an artist in their Generation Now label/company. He is still currently a part of this organization which consists of himself, DJ Drama, Don Cannon and Lil Uzi Vert. His first single of 2015 was "Red Carpet (Roll Out)". On June 9, 2015, Skeme released the mixtape Ingleworld 2 (hosted by DJ Drama), which featured artists such as The Game, T.I., RJ, Young Thug, BJ the Chicago Kid and Lil Uzi Vert. Ingleworld 2 was later released as an album as a no DJ version. Later he announced a third album in his "Ingleworld" series, which was to be released on November 13, 2015.

=== 2015–present Ingleworld4Eva ===
Skeme featured on The Game's second disc of The Documentary 2 on the song "My Flag/Da Homies", which was also released as a single prior to the album's release. A video for this song was released on December 17, 2015. Skeme also featured on a track released by rapper Wale, "Know Me". Recently, Skeme announced another and possibly final addition to his Ingleworld album series, to be entitled Ingleworld4eva. In preparation for this album, he has released a mixtape entitled "Before 4Eva" through datpiff.com and other music sites that stream free music.

On May 6, 2016, DJ Drama released a single off his Quality Street Music 2 album, title "Wishing" featuring Chris Brown, Skeme and LyQuin. A music video has been shot for the single and features DJ Drama, Chris Brown, Skeme and LyQuin, with cameo appearances by 50 Cent and The Game.

== Personal life ==
Skeme's great-uncle is the late blues legend Howlin' Wolf. Skeme has one sibling. Skeme's first son Khalil Amari Kimble, nephew to Nipsey Hussle, was born during September 2013. Skeme is an also a loyal member of the Inglewood Family Bloods aka the Westside Flame Gang.

== Musical style ==
Brooklyne Gipson of Complex said that Skeme is a "testament to diversity in L.A.'s sound. With his raspy voice, marked by a slight southern drawl hidden under a distinctly West Coast dialect." She then stated that his raps have the "passion of 2Pac and the wit of Lil Wayne" also complimenting his production choices.

== Discography ==
=== Studio albums ===
List of albums, with selected chart positions
Title	Album details	Peak chart positions		
Title	Album details	US	US R&B	US Rap
Alive & Living	Release date: October 16, 2012; Label: RBC; Format: Digital download	—	—	—
Ingleworld	Release date: December 17, 2013; Label: MADE Headlines; Format: CD, digital download	—	—	—
Ingleworld 3	Release date: November 13, 2015; Label: Blood Money, MADE Headlines, Generation Now, EMPIRE; Format: CD, digital download	—	—	—
Big Money Sonny	Release date: July 8, 2018; Label: Blood Money, MADE Headlines, Generation Now, AD, inc.; Format: CD, digital download	—	—	—

=== Mixtapes ===
- 2007: Skeme of Things
- 2009: Skeme of Things 2
- 2010: All Rap'd Up
- 2010: Pistols and Palm Trees
- 2011: The Statement
- 2011: Before My Next Statement
- 2013: Bare with Me
- 2015: Ingleworld 2
- 2015: Ingleworld 3
- 2016: Before 4Eva
- 2016: Paranoia
- 2017: First Notice
- 2017: Second Notice
- 2018: One Night Only Vol.2

=== Singles ===
==== As lead artist ====
List of singles, with selected chart positions and certifications, showing year released and album name
Title	Year	Peak chart positions			Album
Title	Year	US	US R&B	US Rap	Album
"Ain't Bout Dat Life " (featuring Jay 305)	2012	—	—	—	Alive & Living
"Kidz With Gunz" (featuring Schoolboy Q)	2012	—	—	—	Alive & Living
"Different"	2013	—	—	—	Ingleworld
"Look What I Did" (Skeme featuring T.I.)	2014	—	—	—	Play Dirty, Stay Dirty
"Anyways"	2015	—	—	—	Ingleworld 3
"36 Oz" (featuring Chris Brown)	2015	—	—	—	Ingleworld 3
"—" denotes a recording that did not chart or was not released in that territory.

==== As featured artist ====
List of singles as featured performer, with selected chart positions showing year released and album name
Title	Year	Peak chart positions			Album
Title	Year	US	US R&B	US Rap	Album
"T.O." (Problem featuring Skeme)	2012	—	118	—	Welcome to Mollywood
"Show Summ" (League of Starz featuring Problem, Skeme, Freddie Gibbs, Jay Rock, Glasses Malone and Bad Lucc)	2013	—	—	—	—N/a
"Wishing" (DJ Drama featuring Chris Brown, Skeme and LyQuin)	2016	77	29	—	Quality Street Music 2
"—" denotes a recording that did not chart or was not released in that territory.
