= From the Westside with Love II =

Studio album by Dom Kennedy
- Released: June 28, 2011
- Recorded: 2010–11
- Genre: Hip hop
- Length: 66:34
- Label: The Other Peoples Money Company
- Producer: DJ Mustard; Drewbyrd; Champagne Click; Chuck Inglish; Chromatix; Cardo; The Futuristiks; Hellagood; K. Roosevelt; Nick Cage; Polyester the Saint; Swiff D; THC; Scoop DeVille

Dom Kennedy chronology
From the Westside with Love II (2011)	Get Home Safely (2013)

From the Westside with Love II is the debut studio album by American rapper Dom Kennedy. The album was released on June 28, 2011. The album features guest appearances from Asher Roth, Sir Michael Rocks, Polyester the Saint, Big K.R.I.T., Casey Veggies and Schoolboy Q. Cover Art by Christian Lucero a.k.a Archer One

== Track listing ==
No.	Title	Producer(s)	Length
1.	"Dom's Prayer"	K. Roosevelt	4:04
2.	"Grind'n"	Cardo	3:54
3.	"When I Come Around"	J.LBS / DJ Mustard	3:43
4.	"Come Over"	The Futuristiks	4:12
5.	"She Ain't In Love"	The Futuristiks	3:34
6.	"Money Don't Stop"	Chromatix	3:19
7.	"O.P.M."	Drewbyrd; Polyester the Saint	4:28
8.	"Platinum Chanel"	Nick Cage	3:44
9.	"I Love Dom"	Cardo	3:19
10.	"The Ways"	THC	4:33
11.	"Mr Champagne Intermission" (featuring Polyester the Saint)	Swiff D	2:16
12.	"Ice Cream Truck"	K. Roosevelt	4:17
13.	"New Jeeps" (featuring Asher Roth & Mikey Rocks)	Chuck Inglish	3:55
14.	"2mph" (featuring Big K.R.I.T.)	The Futuristiks	4:47
15.	"Beats, Hoes and Rhymes" (featuring Casey Veggies & Schoolboy Q)	Champagne Click	4:50
16.	"Dream to Me"	Scoop DeVille	3:18
17.	"Graduate"	Hellagood	4:21

== Charts ==
Chart (2011)	Peak position
US Billboard 200	96
US Top R&B/Hip-Hop Albums (Billboard)	19
US Independent Albums (Billboard)	15
