= Get Home Safely =

Studio album by Dom Kennedy
- Released: October 15, 2013
- Recorded: 2012–13
- Genre: Hip hop
- Length: 1:03:50
- Label: The Other Peoples Money Company
- Producer: Archie Davis (exec.); Dom Kennedy (exec.); DJ Tech; DJ Mustard; Drewbyrd; Danny Keys; Dave Foreman; DJ Khalil; Dammo; G. Ca$$o; The Futuristiks; Larrance; Nick Brongers; Preach; Troy Noka; YuYu

Dom Kennedy chronology
From the Westside with Love, II (2011)	Get Home Safely (2013)	By Dom Kennedy (2015)

Singles from Get Home Safely
- 1. "Still Callin'" Released: February 7, 2014

Get Home Safely is the second studio album by American rapper Dom Kennedy. The album was released on October 15, 2013. The album features guest appearances from Skeme, Krondon, Ty Dolla Sign, Nipsey Hussle and TeeFLii.

== Background ==
On March 25, 2013, Dom Kennedy announced his second studio album would be titled Get Home Safely and announced it would be released in summer 2013. In September 2013, during an interview with HipHopDX, he spoke about what fans can expect from the album, saying: "Man, they can expect the highest quality music they’ve definitely heard from me, and they’ve probably heard from a lot of genres—not just Hip Hop. I’m introducing the album to encourage and reach a lot of people that probably never knew who Dom Kennedy was. But it’s in a great way. Without changing what I do or without compromising the integrity of Rap music or anything, I feel like people will be proud to say that this is their favorite Rap album of the moment. I feel like it’s been few and far between that people are able to say that in our generation. For people interested in Hip Hop and Rap music, I feel like they’ll be proud to say that, “You need to listen to this; this is a great body of work.” It represents something bigger than just $10 or just one person."

In the same interview, he spoke about his favorite song on the album, saying: "Man...to keep it real, without sounding wack, all of them. But you know, each for different reasons. There’s a song on there called “Black Bentley,” that I can say I’m proud of for writing. I’m proud that I stayed up until 6:30 in the morning to do it to get it all out. It's probably my favorite song I’ve ever written. It might not be my favorite Dom Kennedy song ever, but it's definitely the best song I’ve ever written. A lot of it is more like poetry to melodic and hard Rap beats. And I feel like, in the context of that, the writing on there is great. It's great quality writing. I would compare it more to a book, an audio book, than an album, you know? It's more traditional. I’m talking more about my life than the Rap you’re hearing nowadays."

He went on to discuss what inspired "Black Bentley", saying: "Man, just life! Different phases. Last year, I lost someone important to me, and that makes you ask yourself a lot of questions. I’ve been growing up. I went overseas for the first time in my life last year, off the Yellow Album. That’ll change your whole perspective, on a world tour. The more you travel, the more people you meet, the more stories you hear, it’s like the little things become big, and the things you think are big become little. You know what I’m saying? Material things like that become smaller; relationships, dedication, sacrifices and leaving a real legacy become more important. This is the album that I always wanted to make. If I were a kid and I was looking at me, I would say that this is the album I’d want to make. It tells more so about me as a person."

He also spoke about if the album sounds like anything else he's done, saying:

"It’s both in a weird way. It’s a completely new thing, but the quality is going to be there because it’s not my first album. If the first time you heard of Dom Kennedy was Get Home Safely, and then I never did another CD after that, you’d probably think I was the greatest person that ever happened [laughs]. That’s how it would really go down. But that’s not what I wanted. That’s not real. It’s a process. So knowing that, people are obviously going to know that it’s me. People are going to know that it’s good because I’ve made good songs before, but the level of this, they’ve probably never heard. We worked really hard. I had a lot of top-level people around me producing…people that really know instruments. We took a lot of chances, but they were calculated. There weren’t any accidents."

== Release and promotion ==
Kennedy spoke about the process of releasing the album, saying: "There haven’t been no push-backs really. We’re in the process of mixing it right now. My original intent was to put out the Yellow Album—and I never wanted to sell that—and then charge people now, when I’d really need it. That was my plan, to put this out right at the end of summer. Really, I’m sticking to my plan. We’re looking to sell it independently to iTunes and Best Buy. That’s where it’s going to be. We’re looking at an official date, and when we have to turn it in and all that, we just got that info we’ve been waiting on." On August 28, 2013, he announced that the album would be released on October 1, 2013. On September 5, 2013, the music video was released for "South Central Love". On September 18, 2013, he announced that the album would be pushed back until October 15, 2013.

On December 28, 2013, Dom Kennedy announced that the Get Home Safely Tour would begin on January 23, 2014 and run through the end of February 2014. Rapper Skeme joined Kennedy for the duration of the North American leg of the tour as the supporting act.

On February 2, 2014, the music video was released for "Still Callin'" featuring TeeFLii. Then on February 7, 2014, "Still Callin'" was released for digital download as the album's lead single.

== Critical reception ==
Professional ratings
Review scores
Source	Rating
AllMusic	3.5/5 stars
Complex	(positive)
DJBooth.net	3.5/5 stars
Exclaim!	4/10
HipHopDX	3/5 stars
Vibe	(positive)
XXL	4/5 (XL)

Get Home Safely was met with generally positive reviews from music critics. Steven Goldstein of HipHopDX gave the album three out of five stars, saying "Dom Kennedy is the genre’s ambassador for not trying too hard, and Get Home Safely stands out in 2013 for refusing to force anything. It also doesn’t challenge itself much, and the album’s potential is stunted by casualness eventually blending with complacency over the course of 16 songs. If Pusha T just came out with My Name Is My Name as the “conscious dopeboy,” then Dom's the conscious hedonist—his strengths lying in candor and an unfiltered stream of consciousness that makes him a storyteller not over-telling his story." Max Weinstein of Vibe gave the album a positive review, saying "That’s just the thing about Get Home Safely—look too deep and you might get what you wished for, which isn’t a whole lot. Even the album’s name sets out the mission of the music: to return you to your secure cocoon. Dom doesn’t want to challenge or confuse you; he just wants to make you happy. Those looking for a little flare and intensity to their music might want to opt for West Coast cousins like Nipsey, YG, or Bad Lucc, but if Dom’s music weaves a web of serenity for you to kick back and relax to, then Get Home Safely will take you right to your door." Gregory Heaney of AllMusic gave the album three and a half stars out of five, saying "Get Home Safely isn't an album that's going to turn a house party upside down or bring a dancefloor to its knees, but that's not really Kennedy's intention. Instead, the songs feel like casual slices of life, painting a picture of Kennedy's world in a way that's relatable and engaging. "

Chayne Japal of Exclaim! gave the album a four out of ten, saying "Although Dom Kennedy has established himself as a trusted representative for hip-hop's resurgent West coast scene, new album Get Home Safely does little to reinforce his status or display any evolution from his mixtape days. At its core, this is an ordinary hip-hop record; Dom reflects on the perils and pleasures of his past while boasting about the current exploits of a cool kid from urban America. While this tried-and-true formula should have been safe, the record gets tied up in its pretentiousness, as Dom doles out shout-outs and speeches on interludes, suggesting some sort of triumph — a bold façade to dress up this shallow, misdirected collection." Christian Mordi of XXL gave the album an XL, saying "The track sequencing is one of the greatest strengths of the album; no beat seems out of place allowing you to glide smoothly through the album. That diversity and efficiency is reflected in the lyrical content as well: the frequency of thought provoking songs not-related to women is at an all-time high for him. DK and the OPM crew may not have the major label engine behind the movement, but he has proven with Get Home Safely that he’s one of the ambassadors of the New West."

=== Accolades ===
It was positioned at number 12 on XXL's list of the best albums of 2013. They elaborated saying, "Dom Kennedy’s Get Home Safely continued to solidify his place in the rap game with feel-good anthems that transport you to the sunny streets of L.A. Entailing features from Ty Dolla $ign and Nipsey Hu$$le, the sophomore album made waves in the hip-hop community." Complex ranked the album at number 48, on their list of the 50 best albums of 2013. They commented saying, "He isn't attempting to wow anyone with rhyme schemes, instead opting to use his skills to tell the story of the L.A. neighborhood that he holds dear to his heart. Get Home Safely comes a year after his critically acclaimed free project, The Yellow Album, and it continues in the vein of that project: vintage-sounding production (courtesy of producers The Futuristiks) behind Dom's cool, conversational flow. Rhymes about people, places and products that mean something to him."

== Commercial performance ==
The album debuted at number 23 on the Billboard 200 chart, with first-week sales of 10,000 copies in the United States.

== Track listing ==
No.	Title	Producer(s)	Length
1.	"Let's Be Friends"	The Futuristiks	3:35
2.	"17"	The Futuristiks; Larrance	3:13
3.	"All Girl Crazy"	The Futuristiks; Nick Brongers	3:47
4.	"After School"	The Futuristiks; Dammo	4:02
5.	"If It Don't Make Money" (featuring Skeme)	The Futuristiks; DJ Khalil	3:00
6.	"Honey Buns Interlude"	The Futuristiks; Dave Foreman	0:48
7.	"Honey Buns" (featuring Krondon)	The Futuristiks; YuYu	3:16
8.	"Erica Part 2"	The Futuristiks; DJ Khalil; Dave Foreman; Danny Keys	2:55
9.	"Black Bentleys"	The Futuristiks; DJ Khalil	3:29
10.	"Tryna Find My Way"	The Futuristiks	3:39
11.	"A Intermission for Watts"	The Futuristiks; Preach	3:20
12.	"South Central Love"	The Futuristiks	3:07
13.	"Dominic"	Drewbyrd	4:16
14.	"Still Callin" (featuring TeeFLii)	Drewbyrd	4:26
15.	"Pleeze" (featuring Nipsey Hussle)	Drewbyrd	3:33
16.	"The 5 Year Theory (Real Shit Last)"	DJ Tech	9:14

iTunes bonus track
No.	Title	Producer(s)	Length
17.	"2morrow (We Aint Worried)" (featuring Ty Dolla Sign)	G. Ca$$o	4:10

Best Buy bonus tracks
No.	Title	Producer(s)	Length
17.	"A.M.N.I.G.z"	Troy Noka	3:49
18.	"Nothing Like Me" (featuring DJ Mustard)	DJ Mustard	2:55

== Charts ==
Chart (2013)	Peak position
US Billboard 200	23
US Top R&B/Hip-Hop Albums (Billboard)	4
US Independent Albums (Billboard)	4
