= Mike & Keys =

Production duo

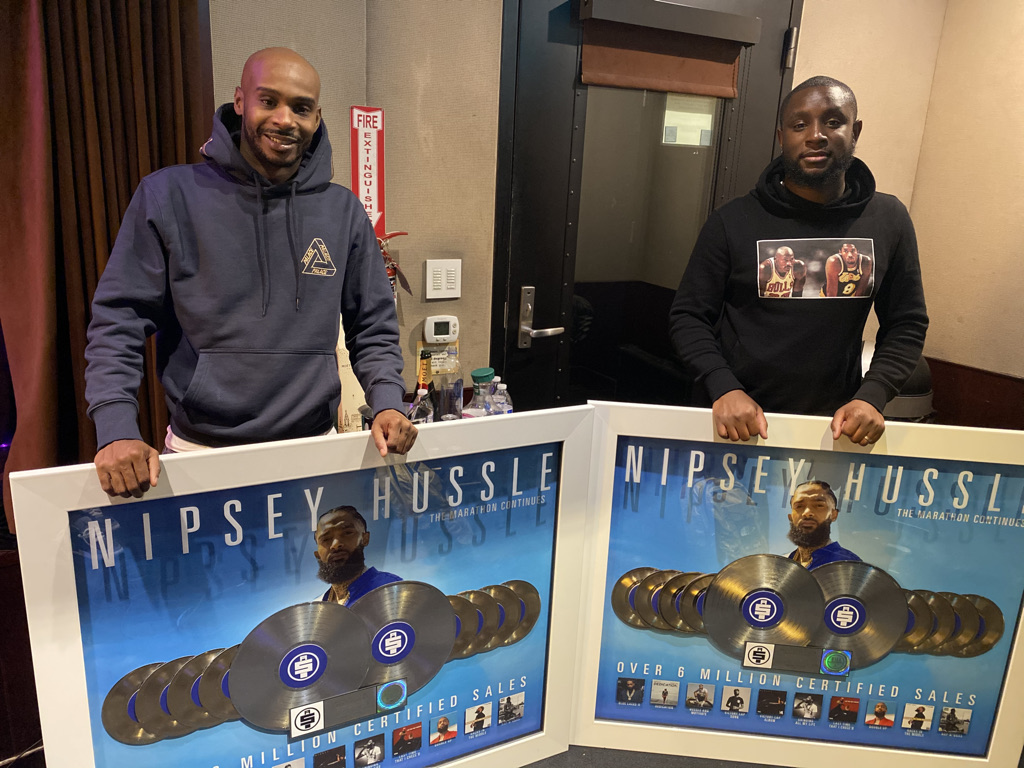
- Money Mike (left) and J-Keys (right) in March 2021

Background information
- Also known as: The Futuristiks
- Origin: Los Angeles, California, U.S.,
- Genres: Hip hop
- Years active: 2009–present
- Label: Street Corner
- Members: Mike; J-Keys
- Website: www.mikeandkeys.com

Mike & Keys (formerly known as The Futuristiks) are an American hip hop production and songwriting duo from Los Angeles, California that consists of Money Mike (born Michael Ray Cox, Jr.) and J-Keys (born John Groover).

== History ==
J-Keys, born in South Sacramento, and Money Mike born in Hammond, Louisiana, both name church and family as having a huge influence on the development of their musical talents. Graduates of the Los Angeles Recording School in Hollywood, CA, the duo's first full production credit came in 2009 on Before I Self Destruct for rapper 50 Cent. After further work in 2010 on hip hop albums such Dom Kennedy’s From the Westside with Love, II, Redman's Reggie, and Sheek Louch’s Donnie G: Don Gorilla, The Futuristiks became a prominent production team for hip-hop, R&B and gospel artists.

Proving to be a life-altering year for The Futuristiks, in 2011, their work ranged from hip hop records with chart-topping artists Eminem, Royce da 5'9" and Ras Kass as well as other known acts such as Strong Arm Steady and Mitchy Slick. In 2011, they also produced rapper Problem’s "Last Love" for the unreleased mixtape Plan B which received video spins on BET’s 106 & Park making to the Top Ten Countdown and other video mediums. Moreover, in 2011, they also produced the lead singles for Dom Kennedy's The Original Dom Kennedy and Skeme’s mixtapes The Statement and Before My Next Statement.

Continuing their catalog growth, the production duo began working with R&B artists Jeremih on the highly anticipated Late Nights with Jeremih Mixtape, as well as debut projects for other R&B artists TeeFlii and Elijah Blake. Not leaving their hip hop roots, in 2012, the pair produced tracks for rappers T.I., Freddie Gibbs, Fat Joe, Bad Lucc, 8Ball, Jay Rock, Curren$y and OverDoz. The Futuristiks made the Billboard Top 100 in 2012 for their production on Capitol Records Tito Lopez’s song Mama Proud. They also made the Billboard 200, Top R&B/Hip-Hop Albums chart and Top Rap Album for their production credit on Grand Hustle/Atlantic Records artist T.I.’s Trouble Man: Heavy Is the Head.

As their sound developed and territory expanded in 2013, the Futuristiks were nominated for their first Recording Academy Grammy Award in the Best Rap Album category for their contribution on Lupe Fiasco’s Food & Liquor II: The Great American Rap Album, Pt. 1. Lupe's II topped Billboard's Top R&B/Hip-Hop Albums and Rap Albums charts, while debuting and peaking at No. 5 on the Billboard 200.

The Futuristiks began working with Epic Records/Roc Nation Management artist Casey Veggies, helming the title track and six songs total on the awaited 2013 Life Changes. In 2013, they also produced songs for Master P, Juelz Santana, Adonis the Ace, Drumma Boy, Zeke and K.Roosevelt.

Like many mainstream producers, The Futuristiks, have taken on entire projects and recently hemmed the Executive Producer credits on the Nipsey Hussle’s, October 8, 2013 release Crenshaw. In addition, the Futuristiks have the majority of the producers credit on Dom Kennedy’s, 2013 release Get Home Safely. Their aesthetic is fit for dropping the top, with crawling drums and warped samples that never push the tempo up too high for Dom’s coziness level.

== Production discography ==
=== 2009 ===
50 Cent - Before I Self Destruct

- 06. "Hold Me Down" (produced with Team Ready)

=== 2010 ===
Sheek Louch - Donnie G: Don Gorilla

- 02. "Get It Poppin'"

Redman - Reggie

- 01. "Reggie" (produced with Team Ready)

=== 2011 ===
Dom Kennedy - The Original Dom Kennedy

- 07. "Designer Shit"

Skeme - The Statement

- 04. "F.A.Q. (Interlude)"
- 05. "H.T.F.T." (featuring Casey Veggies)
- 11. "Win (Interlude)"
- 12. "I Can't Lose"
- 13. "Let it Breathe"

Dom Kennedy - From the Westside with Love

- 04. "Come Over"
- 05. "She Ain't In Love"
- 14. "2mph" (featuring Big K.R.I.T.)

Royce Da 5'9" - Success Is Certain

- 01. "Legendary" (featuring Travis Barker) [produced with Eminem)

=== 2012 ===
T.I - Trouble Man: Heavy Is The Head
- "The Way We Ride"
Lupe Fiasco - Food & Liquor II: The Great American Rap Album Pt. 1

- 16. "Hood Now" - co-produced with 1500 or Nothin

=== 2013 ===
Nipsey Hussle - Crenshaw

- 03. "Checc Me Out" (featuring Cobby Supreme and Dom Kennedy)
- 09. "H-Town" (featuring Cobby Supreme, Dom Kennedy, TeeFlii and Skeme)
- 13. "Summertime in That Cutlass"

Dom Kennedy - Get Home Safely

- 01. "Let's Be Friends"
- 02. "17" (produced with Larrance)
- 03. "All Girl Crazy" (produced with Nick Brongers)
- 04. "After School" (produced with Dammo)
- 05. "If It Don't Make Money" (featuring Skeme) [produced with DJ Khalil]
- 06. "Honey Buns Interlude" (produced with Dave Foreman)
- 07. "Honey Buns" (featuring Krondon) [produced with YuYu]
- 08. "Erica Part 2" (produced with DJ Khalil, Dave Foreman, and Danny Keys)
- 09. "Black Bentleys" (produced with DJ Khalil)
- 10. "Tryna Find My Way"
- 11. "A Intermission for Watts" (produced with Preach)
- 12. "South Central Love"

=== 2014 ===
Faith Evans - Incomparable

- 09. "Make Love" (featuring Keke Wyatt) [produced with Mars and Faith Evans]

Nipsey Hussle - Mailbox Money

- 09. "Real Nigga Moves (feat. Dom Kennedy)" produced with Uncle Dave )
- 11. "A Miracle" - co-produced with DJ Khalil
- 12. "No Nigga Like Me (feat. Trae The Truth)"
- 13. "50 Niggaz"

=== 2015 ===
Casey Veggies - Live & Grow

- 05. "New Face$" (produced with Polyester)
- 10. "Sincerely Casey"

Ludacris - Ludaversal

- 05. "Beast Mode"

=== 2016 ===
Domo Genesis - Genesis

- 01. "Awkward Groove"

Riff Raff - Peach Panther

- 10. "Don't Like to Think" (featuring Problem)

BJ the Chicago Kid - In My Mind

- 02. "Man Down" (featuring Buddy and Constantine)
- 03. "Church" (featuring Chance the Rapper and Buddy)
- 12. "Crazy"

=== 2017 ===
Snoop Dogg - Neva Left

- 01. "Neva Left"

Lecrae - All Things Work Together

- 08. "Lucked Up (feat. Nija)" - co-produced with DJ Khalil and Tariq Beats

=== 2018 ===
Georgia Ann Muldrow - "Overload"

- 02. "Play It Up"
- 03. "Overload"
- 04. "Blam"

Buddy - "Harlon & Alondra"

- 02. "Shameless (feat. Guapdad 4000" - co-produced with Jake One
- 05. "Legend" -co-produced with Brody Brown and Roofeeo
- 07. "The Blue (feat. Snoop Dogg)" -co-produced with Brody Brown and Roofeeo
- 08. "Speechless"- co-produced with Brody Brown and Roofeeo
- 10. "Trippin (feat. Khalid)" - co-produced with Brody Brown and Roofeeo
- 12. "Shine" - co-produced with DJ Khalil

Nipsey Hussle - "Victory Lap"

- 02. "Rap Niggas" - co-produced with DJ Khalil and Larrance Dopson
- 03. " Last Time I Checc'd (feat. YG)" - co-produced with Kacey Khalil, Brody Brown, Larrance Dopson
- 04. "Young Nigga"
- 05. "Dedication (feat. Kendrick Lamar)"
- 06. "Blue Laces 2"
- 07."Hussel & Motivate"
- 08. "Status Symbol 3 (feat. Buddy)"
- 09. "Succa Proof"
- 10. "Keys 2 The City (feat. TeeFlii)"
- 12. "Million While You Young (feat. The-Dream"
- 14. "Real Big (feat. Marsha Ambrosius)"
- 16. "Right Hand To God"

Domo Genesis - Facade Records

All tracks, but with co-producers

=== 2019 ===
Domo Genesis

- 01. "Risk"

Guapdad 4000 - Dior Deposits

- 03. "First Things First"
- 11. "Rolex Rockstar" (featuring Buddy)

Jidenna - 85 to Africa

- 04. "Tribe" co-producers DJ Burn One, [a]Five Points Music Group[a]

=== 2021 ===
Dom Kennedy - From the Westside with Love Three

- 08. "Lax" (featuring Frank$)
- 11. "Deep Thought" (featuring Kay Franklin and MyGuyMars)
- 15. "Love You More (Outro)"

=== 2022 ===
Dr. Dre – GTA Online: The Contract

- "Diamond Mind" (featuring Nipsey Hussle and Ty Dolla $ign) (Produced with Dr. Dre, Dem Jointz and The Alchemist)

Dave East - HDIGH

- 01. "Unbelievable" (featuring Method Man)
- 02. "1000 Miles" (Produced with DJ Khalil)
- 03. "Deeper Than Love" (featuring Musiq Soulchild)
- 04. "After Taxes"
- 05. "John Lennon" (featuring Anthony Hamilton)
- 06. "No Cocaine" (Featuring Kalan.FrFr)
- 07. "Crash Out" (Featuring Trae tha Truth)
- 08. "Don't Let Me Down" (Featuring Benny the Butcher and Steven Young)
- 09. "Gregory Hines" (Featuring OnlyIfWeVibe)

=== 2026 ===
AZ - Doe or Die III

- 04. "Uniqueness"
- 06. "Ho Happy (Skit)"
- 08. "Surprise" (featuring Nas)
