= Ahsan Ali =

Ahsan Ali may refer to:

- Ahsan Ali (cricketer) (born 1993), Pakistani cricketer
- Ahsan Ali (physician) (1937–2019), Bangladeshi physician
- Ahsan Ali Syed (born 1973), Indian businessman
- Ahsan Ali Taj (born 1980), Pakistani music composer
