= Ahsan Watts =

American singer

Ahsan J.A.
- Born: Ahsan Watts; 1999 (age 26–27); Newark, New Jersey U.S.
- Genres: Soul, R&B
- Occupation: Singer
- Instrument: Vocals
- Years active: 2011–present
- Label: Interscope records
- Website: Official website

Ahsan Watts (born 1999), known professionally as Ahsan J.A., is a soul and R&B singer from Newark, New Jersey.

Ashan Watts gained initial attention when his cover of The Jackson 5's "Who's Lovin' You" went viral on YouTube and again after a second video featured a surprise appearance by Stevie Wonder that ended in a duet of "Ribbon in the Sky". Ahsan credits classic soul and R&B artists such as Stevie Wonder, Frankie Lymon, and Michael Jackson for inspiring him to join his grandfather, Bishop L. C. Terry Sr, in his Fellowship of Holiness Church choir in Newark, NJ, at the age of five. His godfather, Don Richardson, who signed a contract with Def Jam Recordings as a child, brought attention to Ahsan's voice.

After his signing with Interscope Records in 2012, Ahsan performed a cover of "Have Yourself A Merry Little Christmas," featuring Lucki Gurlz. In November 2013, his single "Under" was released. The song gave attention to Ahsan's motivation to avoid succumbing to the ghetto lifestyles of his native Newark.

Among his live appearances are Arthur Ashe Kids' Day and at Stevie Wonder's 17th Annual House Full of Toys Benefit Concert in 2012. He has performed in Newark as guest of Mayor Cory Booker, Newark mayoral candidate, Ras J. Baraka., and Darlene Love at NJPAC. In 2014, Ahsan toured with Ashanti to Jackson Rancheria.
