= TeeFlii =

American singer

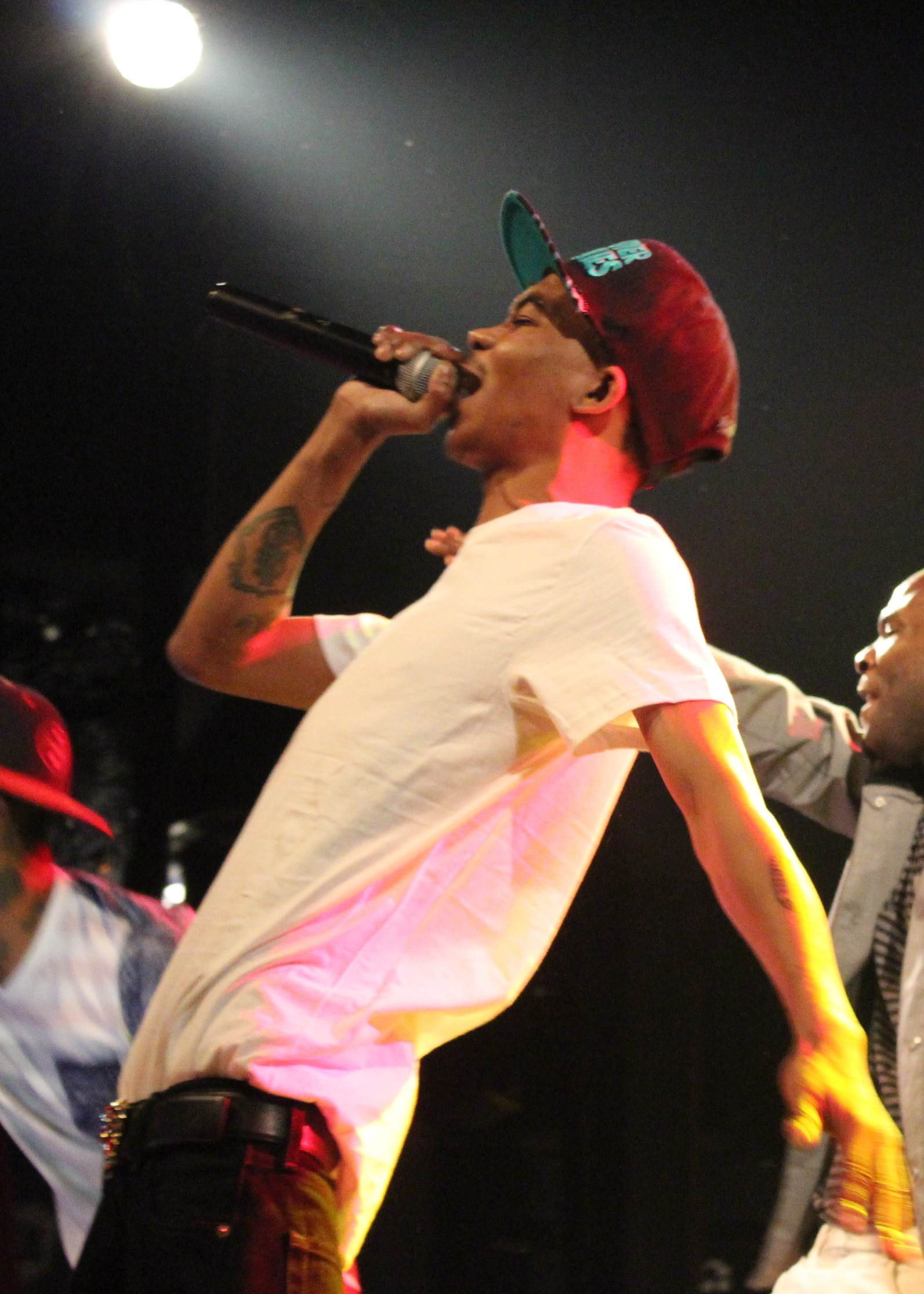
- TeeFlii performing in 2013

Background information
- Born: Christian Joel Jones; July 17, 1987 (age 39); Los Angeles, California, U.S.
- Genres: R&B; West Coast hip-hop
- Occupations: Singer; songwriter; rapper; record producer; dancer
- Years active: 2007–present
- Labels: Excuse My Liquor; E1; Epic
- Children: 6

Christian Joel Jones (born July 17, 1987), better known by his stage name TeeFlii (stylized as TeeFLii), is an American singer, songwriter, rapper, and record producer from South Los Angeles, California. He is best known for his 2014 single "24 Hours" (featuring 2 Chainz), which entered the Billboard Hot 100. The song, released by Epic Records, served as the lead single for his debut studio album Starr (2015), which failed to chart. Also in 2014, he co-wrote fellow Los Angeles-based rapper Kid Ink's single "Show Me", which peaked at number 13 on the Billboard Hot 100.

== Early life ==
Jones developed an interest in music as a child attending church, drawn to keyboards after seeing how much his grandfather, who was a pastor, paid his organ players. Frequenting his grandfather's church, he learned to play multiple instruments, such as the organ, piano, guitar and drums. He played drums for Barbra Streisand at a Democratic Party event. Music helped provide stability in his life, as his mother battled drug addiction throughout his childhood, and he did not know his biological father until his teens. Jones began smoking marijuana at age eight and moved out of his parents' place for good at age thirteen. He described his childhood self by saying, "I was bad—fighting, stealing. I'd go take your bike, bring it to my backyard, spray-paint it, try to ride it around."

As a teenager, Jones began dancing and krumping, performing under the name Baby Tight Eyez, and earned placement in a few early Chris Brown music videos as well as appearing in a major role in Rize, David LaChapelle's 2005 documentary about Los Angeles' Krump scene. After the film was released, by the time he was 19, he had been living at various friends' houses, and after having his first daughter he went through an issue with the mother, where he lost visitation rights. He then started writing songs for other people to "get the vent off" and started seeing a better chance at stability in his life, so he pushed himself as an artist.

He created his stage name partially from his experience in the movie "Rize." He says in an interview, "TeeFLii came from dancing. I was in the Rize movie, and my name in the movie was Baby Tight Eyez. I was under somebody in dancing named Tight Eyez, then I wanted to branch off and do my own thing when I started getting older. I wanted to have my own name and something I could say that I did for myself. I grew up under another dude named Flii Stylz who choreographed for Chris Brown, Usher, Omarion, everybody in the game. I took a liking to him and next thing I knew, I just took the name TeeFLii."

== Career ==
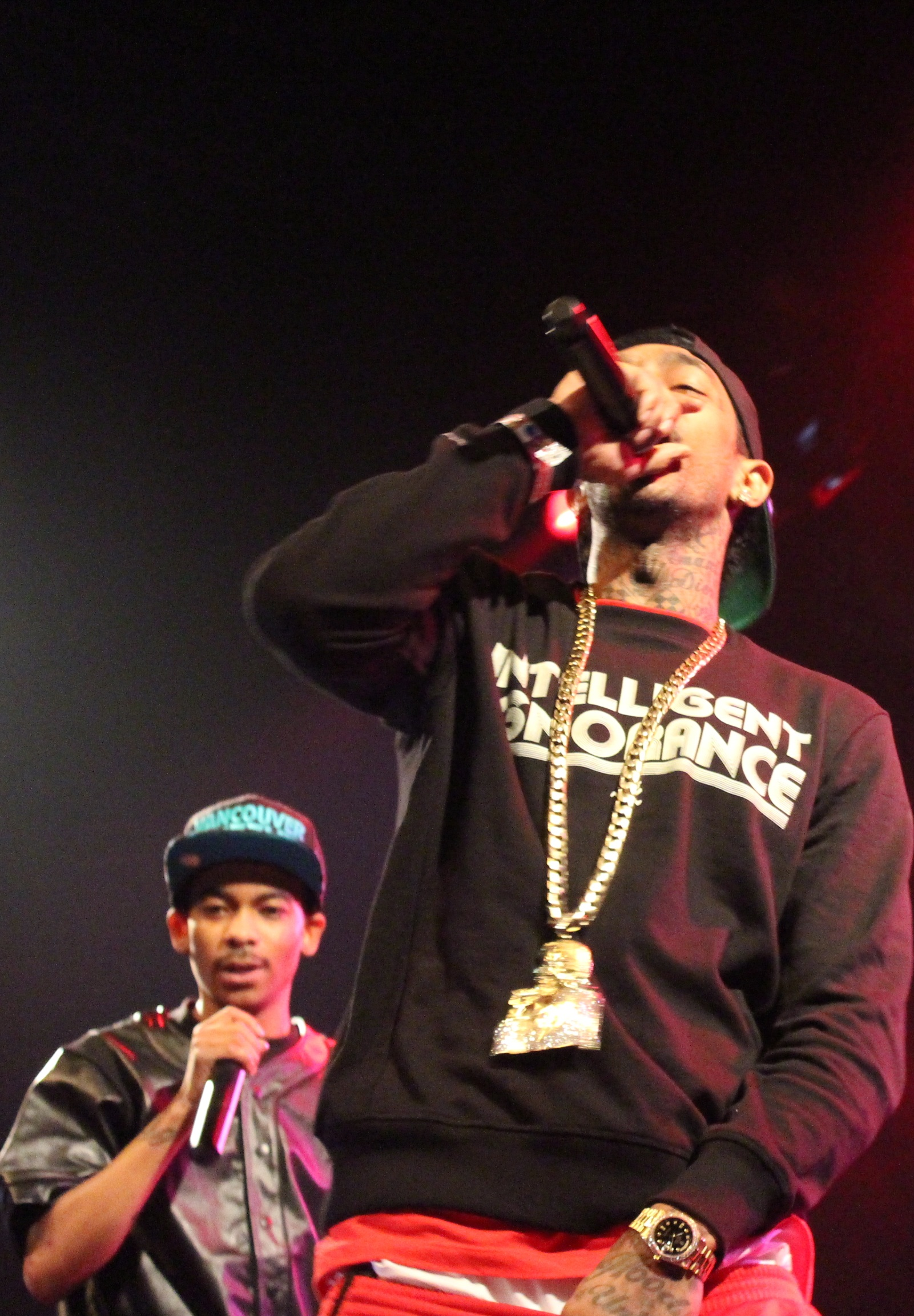
TeeFlii (left) performing with frequent collaborator Nipsey Hussle in December 2013.

Early on his career prior to releasing his first project, TeeFlii collaborated with West Coast-based rappers such as Problem, YG, Nipsey Hussle and Skeme. His debut mixtape AnNieRuO'TAY 1 was released on November 21, 2012. It featured collaborations with Skeme, Problem, Bad Lucc, and Nipsey Hussle among others. AnNieRuO'TAY 1 was met with generally positive reviews from music critics. His second official mixtape AnNieRuO'TAY 2: The TakeOver was released on March 5, 2013. It featured production by DJ Mustard, 1500 or Nothin' and TeeFlii himself. At the same time he was recording his next mixtape, a project entirely produced by DJ Mustard to be released soon. He also indicated that he was working on a project with Nipsey Hussle. AnNieRuO'TAY 2 was met with mainstream coverage from publications such as Chicago Reader, and Fact, among others.

On July 4, 2013, TeeFlii released his third mixtape in eight months, the DJ Mustard-produced Fireworks. It featured collaborations with Dom Kennedy, Casey Veggies, Ty Dolla Sign, Omarion and E-40, among others. The mixtape would receive positive reviews upon release, Stereogum would end up naming it the "Mixtape of the Week". Rolling Stone also would name it the fourth best mixtape of 2013. They said, "Where Mustard's beats normally evoke a strip club's booty-whomp, here he pushes himself, brilliantly, towards R&B smoothness." On July 16, 2013, the music video for "This D" was premiered by Vice. In August 2013, TeeFlii signed to Epic Records after being actively persuaded by label executive L.A. Reid. Then on October 2, 2013, "This D" was released as his debut single. The following day, he released the remix to "This D", featuring Jadakiss and Tyga. After "This D" received major radio rotation in Los Angeles, he got a major co-sign from rapper Snoop Dogg. The song would peak at number 35 on the US Billboard Rhythmic chart.

In October 2013, LA Weekly named TeeFlii the best R&B singer in Los Angeles. On November 25, 2013, he released his fourth mixtape AnnieRUO'TAY 3: Who The Fuck Is Annie?. The seventeen track mixtape featured a collaboration with Dom Kennedy and production by The Futuristiks and himself, among others. On December 9, 2013, "That's How We Livin'" a collaboration with Snoop Dogg and Warren G was released. It was then included on Snoop's mixtape That's My Work Vol. 2.

On March 26, 2014, TeeFlii premiered his second official single "24 Hours" featuring 2 Chainz, with production by DJ Mustard. Along with its release, it was announced that TeeFlii's debut studio album would be titled Starr and released during mid-2014. "24 Hours" was serviced to urban contemporary radio in the United States on April 7, 2014, and then was serviced to rhythmic contemporary radio on May 6, 2014. The track peaked at number 85 on the Billboard Hot 100 and served as a bonus track on Starr.

On August 27, 2021, TeeFlii released his EP, "Today", which included his new single "Automatic" produced by Grammy Award Winning Producer Los Da Mystro.

And on the 8th of July 2023 he released the Album "TruFlii" with the artist Tru Carr.

== Personal life ==
TeeFlii's invocations of his faith are frequent as he believes in Christianity. His grandmother was a gospel singer and his aunt harmonized for Elvis Presley's backup group, The Sweet Inspirations. His grandmother is the one that taught him the most about singing. He has five children; four daughters, and one son.

== Discography ==
=== Studio albums ===
List of albums, with selected chart positions
Title	Album details	Peak chart positions		
Title	Album details	US	US R&B/HH	US Rap
Starr	Released: February 3, 2015; Label: Excuse My Liquor, Epic Records; Format: CD, digital download	—	42	—
"—" denotes a title that did not chart, or was not released in that territory.

=== Mixtapes ===
List of mixtapes
Title	Album details
AnNieRuO'TAY 1	Released: November 21, 2012; Hosted by DJ Goofy; Format: Digital download
AnNieRuO'TAY 2: The TakeOver	Released: March 7, 2013; Hosted by DJ Carisma and DJ Mustard; Format: Digital download
Fireworks	Released: July 4, 2013; Produced by DJ Mustard; Format: Digital download
AnNieRuO'TAY 3: Who The Fuck Is Annie	Released: November 21, 2013; Hosted by DJ Carisma; Format: Digital download
AnnieRuO'TAY 4	Released: June 30, 2015; Hosted by DJ Carisma; Format: Digital download
AnnieRUO'TAY 5 (What Happened To TeeFLii?)	Released: June 30, 2016; Hosted by DJ Carisma; Format: Digital download
Next Level (with Jermaine Dupri)	Released: May 30, 2018; Hosted by Jermaine Dupri and So So Def; Format: Digital

=== Singles ===
==== As lead artist ====
List of singles, with selected chart positions, showing year released and album name
Title	Year	Peak chart positions				Album
Title	Year	US	US R&B/HH	US Rap	US Rhy.	Album
"This D"	2013	—	—	—	35	—N/a
"24 Hours" (featuring 2 Chainz)	2014	85	21	15	8	Starr
"Change Your World"	2014	—	—	—	—	Starr
"Blue Lipstick" (featuring Chris Brown)	2014	—	—	—	—	Starr
"—" denotes a recording that did not chart or was not released in that territory.

==== As featured artist ====
List of featured singles, with selected chart positions, showing year released and album name
Title	Year	Peak chart positions			Album
Title	Year	US	US R&B/HH	US Rap	Album
"Still Callin'" (Dom Kennedy featuring TeeFlii)	2014	—	—	—	Get Home Safely
"Do It to Ya" (YG featuring TeeFlii)	2014	—	—	—	My Krazy Life
"—" denotes a recording that did not chart or was not released in that territory.

=== Guest appearances ===
List of non-single guest appearances, with other performing artists, showing year released and album name
Title	Year	Other performer(s)	Album
"Like Me"	2012	Problem	Welcome To Mollywood 2
"Hollywood"	2012	DJ Quik	Hollywood
"Fuck That Nigga"	2013	DJ Mustard, Ty Dolla Sign, Constantine, Tory Lanez	Ketchup
"Hate It or Love It"	2013	Nipsey Hussle	Crenshaw
"Sprung"	2013	YG	Just Re'd Up 2
"Get It"	2013	RJ	O.M.M.I.O
"That's How We Livin"	2013	Snoop Dogg, Warren G	I Got That Work Vol. 3
"Favorite Position"	2014	Boxxx	XTC
"Where The Party At"	2014	Slim 400	Keepin' It 400
"Deep"	2014	DJ Mustard, Rick Ross, Wiz Khalifa	10 Summers
"Valet"	2014	Eric Bellinger, Pleasure P	Choose Up Season
"Neva Met"	2015	Rick Rock, Snoop Dogg	Rocket
"Pimpin' Ain't Easy"	2016	Problem, Kevin McCall	Hotels 2: The Master Suite
"Proper"	2016	Rayven Justice, Kool John	Do It Justice 2
"Reconsider"	2016	Furious, Clyde Carson	Journey Home
"Busy Body"	2018	Berner, E-40, Too Short	The Big Pescado
"Keyz to the City"	2018	Nipsey Hussle	Victory Lap
"Blue Apts"	2018	King Lil G	Paint the City Blue
"Secret Lovers"	2019	Rayven Justice, Clyde Carson	ESO
"Never Fold Intermission"	2021	Dom Kennedy	From the Westside with Love Three
