= Dom Kennedy =

American rapper (born 1984)

- Born: Dominic Ross Hunn; August 22, 1984 (age 41); Los Angeles, California, U.S.
- Genres: Hip hop; West Coast hip hop
- Occupations: Rapper; songwriter
- Years active: 2008–present
- Label: OPM (Other People's Money)
- Website: DopeItsDom

Dominic Ross Hunn (born August 22, 1984), better known by his stage name Dom Kennedy, is an American rapper. His fourth mixtape, From the Westside with Love (2010), was met with critical acclaim; its sequel, From the Westside with Love II (2011), served as his debut studio album and entered the Billboard 200. His second and third albums, Get Home Safely (2013) and By Dom Kennedy (2015), both peaked at number 23 on the chart and were met with continued praise.

Kennedy is also known for his guest appearance alongside Belly on Nipsey Hussle's 2019 song "Double Up", which entered the Billboard Hot 100. An independent artist, Kennedy's releases are distributed by his own label, the Other People's Money Company, or simply Other People's Money (OPM). His 2012 single, "My Type of Party" was ranked by Complex magazine as among the 50 Best Songs of that year.

== Early life ==
Dom Kennedy was born on August 22, 1984, in Los Angeles, California. In an interview with music media outlet IMFlashy, Kennedy describes his childhood growing up as "normal". After his parents' divorce, Kennedy moved with his mother to Leimert Park. Kennedy played baseball to get out of the inner city to stay safe and out of trouble. He also played basketball everyday from the age of five to the age of 16. Upon graduating from Santa Monica High School, Kennedy enrolled in Santa Monica College, a two-year junior college in California, majoring in business management. In an interview with Dr. Josh Hamilton in October 2012, Dom gave his reasoning on why he entered college and what his plan B would be.

"I mainly focused on business management while I was there, not really thinking about music per se at first, but just on life. You know, like damn if I wasn't rapping or doing anything with music that was kind of where I saw myself in the world. I always hoped I could be an entrepreneur, you know I guess, but thats the aspirations of many people but I just felt like if I was going to learn about anything I might as well learn about structures of corporations, or at least find out everyone's job."

== Music career ==
Working with his cousin Jason Madison, Kennedy released his debut mixtape album 25th Hour in 2008, instantly producing a buzz throughout the south side of L.A. In particular, the song "Watermelon Sundae" was widely played on local radio stations and performed live throughout the area, bringing more attention to Kennedy's music ambitions. Around this time, Kennedy's cousin Madison was a film student at Loyola Marymount University, sparking the beginning importance of visuals in Kennedy's later projects.

After his 25th Hour debut, Kennedy released 2 additional mixtapes in 2009; Best After Bobby (the title referring to "Bobby" Robert F. Kennedy), and Future Street/Drug Sounds. For the Best After Bobby mixtape, Kennedy collaborated with West Coast heavy hitter DJ Sour Milk and the Los Angeles Leakers, producing an instant buzz in underground circles across the country. Within the first hours of dropping the mixtape, Kennedy amassed over 10,000 downloads, officially solidifying his name among some of the top rappers in L.A.

However, with the release of From the Westside With Love in 2010, Kennedy became a major hit throughout the underground hip hop scene in L.A. Gaining over 100,000 internet downloads, With the success of From the Westside With Love, Kennedy became a major player on the independent circuit, traveling for performances throughout and outside the country; including a show in Djibouti, Africa. Kennedy also began releasing an extensive amount of visual material at this time, including From the Westside With Love music videos for songs such as "1997", "Locals Only", and "The 4 Heartbeats".

In early 2011, Kennedy released his 5th studio mixtape The Original Dom Kennedy, a tape meant to reflect Kennedy's individuality and sound as an artist. In an interview with MTV News reporter James Lacsina, Kennedy described the project as something that was a testament to himself in the rap game as well as the city he proudly represents:

With The Original Dom Kennedy, it was a time for me to take a stand in music. The way we grew up and our lifestyle, being kids from the inner city of Los Angeles. I just felt like that was missing.

— Dom Kennedy, from an interview with Brooklyn Gipsone

Kennedy also took a personal stance in the mixtape against major hip hop DJ and producer Funkmaster Flex. On his song "The Homies", Kennedy takes shots at Flex's disparaging remarks regarding the late California rapper Tupac Shakur: "Shit I heard Funk Flex say that Pac ain't shit/ and I hope when you see him that he slap your mouth/" In 2011, Kennedy performed at premier film festival South by Southwest's Music Matters Show in Albuquerque, New Mexico. The show was hosted by cable entertainment network Black Entertainment Television. Both his performance and that of East Coast rapper J. Cole's were featured online by major, hip hop music magazine The Source (magazine). Kennedy performed his first show outside of the U.S. also in 2011 in Djibouti, Africa.

Following the release of From the Westside With Love II, Kennedy headlined at The Key Club in West Hollywood, California, alongside fellow West Coast rappers Overdoz, Epic Twelve, and Black Cobain. Marketed as the show on "7.1.11", the event was sold out, prompting another show the following week, marketed as the "7.7.11" show.

In 2012, Kennedy traveled throughout Europe and the United States for his Yellow Album World Tour. The tour started in London in October and wrapped up in San Francisco in December.

In early 2013, Interscope Records attempted to sign Dom Kennedy, however he chose to remain independent. His second studio album Get Home Safely was released through his The Other People's Money Company record label on October 15, 2013. The album featured guest appearances from Skeme, Krondon, TeeFLii, Ty Dolla Sign and Nipsey Hussle. Get Home Safely debuted at number 29 in its first week, selling more than 10,000 copies in the United States.

On June 2, 2015, Dom Kennedy released his third studio album entitled, By Dom Kennedy. The album peaked at number 23 on the Billboard 200, selling 9,000 copies the first week. On December 23, 2016, Dom Kennedy released his fourth studio album entitled, Los Angeles Is Not For Sale, Vol. 1.

Dom Kennedy teamed up with Hit-Boy in order to create their own Hip-Hop group entitled Half-A-Mil. They would go on to release three self-titled EP's that dropped sporadically throughout late 2016 into mid 2017. Then later officially released their debut album Courtesy Of Half-A-Mil on November 24, 2017. In 2019, Kennedy was featured in Kehlani's song "Nunya" from her mixtape, While We Wait. He also appeared in the song's music video, which was released on February 20, 2019.

== Additional information ==
In 2014 Dom Kennedy signed Los-Angeles based rap group, Warm Brew to his independent-label OPM.

== Influences ==
Kennedy is often heard proclaiming his hometown rep one liner "Leimert Park what's cool". As a kid, Kennedy describes himself as being highly influenced by artists such as "The Notorious B.I.G., Outkast, 2Pac, and LL Cool J" through the fact that by simply listening to their music, he could feel a sense of where they were from. With his music, Kennedy does the same thing, bringing the feel of the inner city streets of L.A. to anyone willing to listen. In an interview with Hip Hop DX, Kennedy talks about the influence behind the L.A. sound in his music:

If anything, and I can only speak for myself, I think that I’m trying to do it like DJ Quik did it, or Ice Cube did it, but this is just my way of doing it therefore I guess it’s natural. But I’m not trying to do anything, you know, different or to say, ‘This is new.’... I set out to do it the way they did it, just in my own way.

— Dom Kennedy, from an interview with Nadine Graham

Kennedy has rapped over a wide range of past and present hip hop beats in his career, consistently bringing the element of L.A. and West Coast hip hop to his music. Such beats include Big Poppa on the track "Notorious Dom" (25th Hour) and Best I Ever Had on the track "Best You Never Had" (Best After Bobby). South by Southwest reports major music executive John Monopoly as saying "He is going to get signed".

=== Musical style and recognition ===
In 2011, Kennedy was recognized as one of the leading artist in a new wave of West coast hip hop artist. Dom Kennedy is known for his laid back flow, wordplay and unique storytelling.

== Discography ==
=== Studio albums ===
List of studio albums, with selected chart positions
Title	Album details	Peak chart positions		
Title	Album details	US	US R&B	US Rap
From the Westside with Love, II	Released: June 28, 2011; Label: The Other People's Money Company; Formats: CD, digital download	96	19	12
Get Home Safely	Released: October 15, 2013; Label: The Other People's Money Company; Formats: CD, digital download	23	4	3
By Dom Kennedy	Released: June 2, 2015; Label: The Other People's Money Company; Formats: digital download	23	3	3
Los Angeles Is Not For Sale, Vol. 1	Released: December 23, 2016; Label: The Other People's Money Company; Formats: digital download	-	42	-
Courtesy Of Half-A-Mil (with Hit-Boy)	Released: November 29, 2017; Label: The Other People's Money Company; Formats: digital download	-	-	-
Volume Two	Released: September 29, 2018; Label: The Other People's Money Company; Formats: digital download	-	-	-
Also Known As (with Hit-Boy)	Released: July 31, 2020; Label: Self-released; Format: Digital Download	-	-	-
Rap N Roll	Released: September 25, 2020; Label: The Other People's Money Company; Formats: digital download	-	-	-
From the Westside with Love Three	Released: October 15, 2021; Label: The Other People's Money Company; Formats: digital download	-	-	-
I Love Stock (with TeeFlii)	Released: June 23, 2023; Label: The Other People's Money Company; Formats: digital download	-	-	-
Class of 95	Released: October 11, 2024; Label: The Other People's Money Company; Formats: digital download	-	-	-

=== Mixtapes ===
List of mixtapes, with year released
Title	Album details
25th Hour	Released: 2008; Label: Self-released; Format: Digital download
FutureStreet/DrugSounds	Released: 2009; Label: Self-released; Format: Digital download
Best After Bobby	Released: 2009; Label: Self-released; Format: Digital download
From the Westside with Love	Released: March 26, 2010; Label: Self-released; Format: Digital download
The Original Dom Kennedy	Released: March 10, 2011; Label: Self-released; Format: Digital download
Yellow Album	Released: June 21, 2012; Label: Self-released; Format: Digital download
Young Nation	Released: October 12, 2012; Label: Self-released; Format: Digital download
Best After Bobby 2	Released: September 7, 2015; Label: Self-released; Format: Digital download
Addicted to The Underground	Released: July 5, 2018; Label: Self-released; Format: Digital download

=== Guest appearances ===
List of non-single guest appearances, with other performing artists, showing year released and album name
Title	Year	Other artist(s)	Album
"Get Through"	2010	Casey Veggies	Sleeping in Class
"Real Estates"	2010	Currensy	Pilot Talk II
"Racing Stripes"	2010	Currensy	Smokee Robinson
"Fat Raps (Remix)"	2010	Big Sean, Chip tha Ripper, Chuck Inglish, Currensy, Asher Roth, Boldy James	Finally Famous Vol. 3: BIG
"She Needs Me (Remix)"	2010	Kendrick Lamar, MURS	Overly Dedicated
"Don't Forget The Swishers"	2010	King Chip, Pac Div, cArter	Independence Day
"Friends.Women.Money"	2011	Fly Union	TGTC (The Greater Than Club)
"Menace II Society"	2011	Freddie Gibbs, Polyester The Saint	Cold Day In Hell
"I Need That"	2011	Nipsey Hussle	The Marathon Continues
"Counting My Money"	2011	Overdoz	Live For, Die For
"No Stress"	2011	Skeme	The Statement
"Pow Wow"	2011	Smoke DZA	Rolling Stoned
"Walk In The M.O."	2012	Freddie Gibbs	Baby Face Killa
"Grooveline Pt. 1"	2012	Schoolboy Q, Currensy	Habits & Contradictions
"What's Ya Name"	2012	Skeme	Alive & Living
"Another One"	2012	Ty Dolla $ign, T. Mills	Beach House
"This Yick"	2013	YG, Joe Moses	Just Re'd Up 2
"She in My Car"	2013	Casey Veggies	Life Changes
"Hella"	2013	Wale, YG	The Gifted
"Checc Me Out"	2013	Nipsey Hussle, Cobby $upreme	Crenshaw
"H-Town"	2013	Nipsey Hussle, Cobby $upreme, Teeflii, Skeme	Crenshaw
"Shoppin"	2013	Niko G4, Jay 305	Roll The Dice
"Throw Your Hood Up"	2014	DJ Mustard, Royce, RJ	10 Summers
"Life Jacket"	2014	DJ Quik, Suga Free	The Midnight Life
"Lord Knows"	2014	Ty Dolla $ign, Rick Ross	Sign Language
"Golden State of Mind"	2015	Fashawn	The Ecology
"After Hours"	2015	Glasses Malone	GlassHouse2: Life Ain't Nuthin' But
"Actin' Up"	2015	Casey Veggies	Live & Grow
"Dusk 2 Dusk"	2016	Pete Rock, Smoke DZA, Big K.R.I.T., theMIND	Don't Smoke Rock
"Bad Azz"	2017	DJ Quik, Problem, Bad Lucc, Boogie	Rosecrans
"Pretty Girls"	2017	Jay 305	Taking All Bets
"On da Low"	2017	Niko G4	Roll the Dice 2
"Double Up"	2018	Nipsey Hussle, Belly	Victory Lap
"Full Effect"	2018	Warm Brew	New Content
"Don't Rush"	2018	P-Lo	PRIME
"The Hook Up"	2018	Smoke DZA, Cozz	Not for Sale
"Main Thang"	2018	Eric Bellinger	Eazy Call
"7AM in Beverly"	2018	24hrs	Houses on the Hill
"Leave LA"	2018	24hrs, Ty Dolla $ign	Houses on the Hill
"Stop Playin'"	2019	Casey Veggies	Organic
"Staring at the Ceiling"	2019	Eric Bellinger	The Rebirth 2
"Chin Checc"	2019	J. Stone	The Definition of Loyalty
"Nunya"	2019	Kehlani	While We Wait
"Gold Daytonas"	2019	The Game	Born 2 Rap
"Five Hundred Dollar Candles"	2019	The Game	Born 2 Rap
"Orange Juice Wit Dom'"	2020	Larry June, Cardo	Cruise USA
"Lebron James"	2020	J. Stone, Nipsey Hussle	The Definition of Pain
"Over the Limit"	2020	Benny The Butcher	Burden of Proof
