= BJ the Chicago Kid discography =

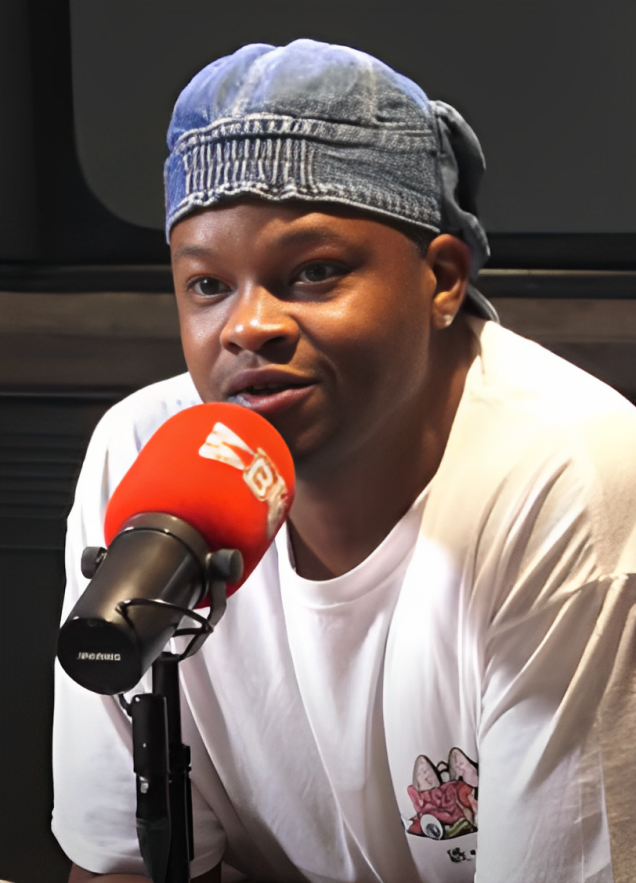
- Sledge in July 2019
- Studio albums: 4
- EPs: 2
- Mixtapes: 7
- Singles: 20+

American R&B singer BJ the Chicago Kid has released four studio albums, two EPs, seven mixtapes, and numerous singles and guest appearances. He is known for blending R&B, soul, and hip-hop, and has collaborated with artists such as Kendrick Lamar, Schoolboy Q, Chance the Rapper, and Freddie Gibbs.

== Albums ==
=== Studio albums ===
Year	Album Details	Peak chart positions	
Year	Album Details	US (Billboard 200)	US R&B (Top R&B Albums)
2012	Pineapple Now-Laters: Released: February 21, 2012; Label: M.A.F.E. Music; Format: Digital	—	—
2016	In My Mind: Released: February 19, 2016; Label: Motown; Format: CD, Digital	59	7
2019	1123: Released: July 26, 2019; Label: Motown; Format: CD, LP, Digital	39	5
2023	Gravy: Released: November 10, 2023; Label: RCA, Sony Music; Format: Digital	—	—

=== EPs ===
Year	Title	Label	Notes	Ref
2013	A Soulful Christmas	Independent	Holiday-themed release	
2018	The Opening Ceremony	Motown	Released May 11, 2018	

=== Mixtapes ===
Year	Mixtape Details	Notes
2009	A Taste of Chicago: Released: June 29, 2009; Format: Digital; Label: Independent	Debut mixtape.
2009	The New Beginning: Released: November 21, 2009; Format: Digital; Label: Independent	Independent release.
2011	The Life of Love's Cupid: Released: February 14, 2011; Format: Digital; Label: Independent	Soulful ballads and collaborations.
2013	A Soulful Christmas: Released: December 10, 2013; Format: Digital; Label: Independent	Holiday-themed EP.
2014	The M.A.F.E. Project: Released: November 19, 2014; Format: Digital; Label: Independent	Features ScHoolboy Q, Freddie Gibbs, Smoke DZA, and Kobe.
2016	The Lost Files: Cuffing Season: Released: February 14, 2016; Format: Digital; Label: Independent	Compilation of unreleased tracks.
2017	A Tribute to Confessions: Released: August 4, 2017; Format: Digital; Label: Independent	Tribute EP honoring Usher’s Confessions.

== Singles ==
=== As lead artist ===
Year	Single Details	US (Hot 100)	US R&B (Top R&B Singles)	US Adult R&B	Album
2012	"Good Luv'n"	—	—	—	Pineapple Now-Laters
2014	"Aiight"	—	—	—	The M.A.F.E. Project
2015	"Church" (feat. Chance the Rapper & Buddy)	—	37	—	In My Mind
2016	"Love Inside"	—	—	—	—
2016	"Turnin' Me Up"	—	22	11	—
2016	"Woman's World"	—	—	—	—
2016	"Uncle Marvin"	—	—	—	The Lost Files: Cuffing Season
2016	"On My Way to Your Heart"	—	—	—	—
2017	"Roses"	—	—	—	Non-album single
2019	"Close"	—	—	—	Non-album single
2019	"Time Today"	—	28	12	1123
2019	"Reach" (feat. Afrojack)	—	—	—	—
2019	"Get Away" (feat. J.I.D. & Kent Jamz)	—	—	—	Non-album single
2021	"Bring it on Home to Me (BJ The Chicago Kid, PJ Morton, Kenyon Dixon & Charlie Bereal)"	—	—	—	Non-album single
2023	"Make You Feel Good"	—	—	—	Gravy
2023	"Liquor Store in the Sky (feat. Freddie Gibbs)"	—	—	—	Gravy

=== As featured artist ===
Year	Single Details	US (Hot 100)	US R&B/Hip-Hop	Album
2006	"Impossible" (Kanye West featuring Twista, Keyshia Cole and BJ)	—	54	Mission: Impossible III
2010	"In the Zone" (David Banner featuring BJ the Chicago Kid)	—	—	non-album single
2014	"Crazy Generation" (Black Collar Biz featuring BJ the Chicago Kid, Muzicgeek and Cash Gotti)	—	—	High Grade Artistry
2014	"Studio" (Schoolboy Q featuring BJ the Chicago Kid)	38	10	Oxymoron
2016	"Last Dance" (Rapper Big Pooh featuring BJ the Chicago Kid)	—	—	non-album single
2016	"Ride Out" (Koache featuring BJ the Chicago Kid)	—	—	Game Point
2016	"Cookie Addiction" (Jay IDK featuring BJ the Chicago Kid)	—	—	non-album single
2016	"Naturally" (DJ Carisma featuring BJ the Chicago Kid and Casey Veggies)	—	—	non-album single
2016	"Issues" (Gary Soulz featuring BJ the Chicago Kid)	—	—	non-album single
2016	"Cheating on Us" (Salaam Remi featuring BJ the Chicago Kid)	—	—	non-album single
2016	"Lost Wild" (Bobby Hagens featuring BJ the Chicago Kid)	—	—	non-album single
2016	"Forever Black America Again" (Common featuring Gucci Mane, Pusha T and BJ the Chicago Kid)	—	—	non-album single
2017	"Angels Your Love" (Mr Jukes featuring BJ the Chicago Kid)	—	—	God First
2018	"Real One" (Peter James featuring BJ the Chicago Kid)	—	—	non-album single
2018	"Us 4ever" (Ledisi featuring BJ the Chicago Kid)	—	—	Let Love Rule
2019	"Rouge à lèvres" (Nekfeu featuring BJ the Chicago Kid)	—	—	Les Étoiles vagabondes : Expansion
2020	"Wishing for a Hero" (Polo G featuring BJ the Chicago Kid)	—	—	The Goat
2020	"I Believe" (Joy Denalane featuring BJ the Chicago Kid)	—	—	Let Yourself Be Loved

== Guest appearances ==
Year	Title	Other performer(s)	Album
2008	"Welcome to the Majors"	Dubb Union	Snoop Dogg Presents: Dubb Union
2008	"Westurn Union"	Dubb Union, Daz Dillinger	Snoop Dogg Presents: Dubb Union
2008	"Struggle"	Dubb Union	Snoop Dogg Presents: Dubb Union
2008	"Miles Away"	Dubb Union	Snoop Dogg Presents: Dubb Union
2009	"Truly Yours"	Diz Gibran	Soon You'll Understand
2009	"Faith"	Kendrick Lamar	The Kendrick Lamar EP
2009	"True Star"	Warren G	The G Files
2009	"Fanatic"	Xzibit, Poo Bear	NBA Live 10 soundtrack
2009	"All Eyez on Me (The Truth)"	Young Dre The Truth, 2Pac	NBA Live 10 soundtrack
2010	"The Coldest"	Freddie Gibbs	Str8 Killa
2010	"R.O.T.C. (Interlude)"	Kendrick Lamar	Overly Dedicated
2010	"So Real"	GLC	Love, Life & Loyalty
2010	"Field Ni*#a Blues"	Mikkey Halsted, Freddie Gibbs	The Darkroom
2011	"I'm Good"	Schoolboy Q, Punch	Setbacks
2011	"Show You"	Pac Div	Mania
2011	"Almost There"	Ab-Soul	Longterm Mentality
2011	"Look Up to the Sky"	Fly Union, P. Blackk	TGTC (The Greater Than Club)
2011	"Do It for You"	Fly Union, Pac Div	TGTC (The Greater Than Club)
2011	"Barely M.A.D.E. It"	Freddie Gibbs	Cold Day In Hell
2011	"Kush & Corinthians (His Pain)"	Kendrick Lamar	Section.80
2011	"Finest Hour"	Jay Rock, Rick Ross	Follow Me Home
2011	"Take a Look Around"	Kindred the Family Soul, Bilal	Love Has No Recession
2011	"Dreams"	CunninLynguists	Oneirology
2012	"Lust Demons"	Ab-Soul, Jay Rock	Control System
2012	"Shame"	Freddie Gibbs, Madlib	Shame
2012	"Good Good Love"	Rapsody	The Idea of Beautiful
2012	"We On (Must Be)"	Marcus Orelias	Rebel of the Underground
2013	"Love = Hate / Ulterior Motives"	Casey Veggies	Life Changes
2013	"Life Is a Gamble"	Big K.R.I.T.	King Remembered In Time
2013	"Everybody's Something"	Chance the Rapper, Saba	Acid Rap
2013	"Smokin' and Ridin'"	Freddie Gibbs, Problem	The Music of Grand Theft Auto V
2013	"Holy Holy"	Vic Mensa, Ab-Soul	INNANETAPE
2014	"Shame"	Freddie Gibbs, Madlib	Piñata
2014	"A Project Mind"	Punch, Jay Rock	Piñata
2014	"Lionheart"	Nefew	Rise of the Antihero
2014	"Like Me"	Joey Bada$$	B4.Da.$$
2014	"Down for You"	Kehlani	You Should Be Here
2014	"To Be Young"	Fashawn	The Ecology
2015	"Slip Slide"	Donnie Trumpet & The Social Experiment, B.o.B, Busta Rhymes, Janelle Monáe	Surf
2015	"Windows"	Donnie Trumpet & The Social Experiment, Raury	Surf
2015	"Expressive"	Slum Village, Illa J	Yes!
2015	"Khalil's Song"	Skeme	Ingleworld 2
2015	"Beautiful Love"	Jill Scott	Woman
2015	"It's All on Me"	Dr. Dre, Justus	Compton
2015	"Life Song"	Casey Veggies	Live & Grow
2015	"Can't Be Still"	Big K.R.I.T.	It's Better This Way
2015	"Game Over"	Omarion	Care Package 3
2015	"In the Streets"	Busta Rhymes, MF Doom	The Return of the Dragon (The Abstract Went On Vacation)
2016	"The Waters"	Anderson .Paak	Malibu
2016	"Real One"	Achromatik	Where Do I Belong
2016	"Blessings"	Chance the Rapper	Coloring Book
2016	"Harry's Code"	Knox Brown	Searching
2016	"Street Life"	Lil Durk	They Forgot
2016	"Milestone"	Smoke DZA, Pete Rock, Jadakiss, Styles P	Don't Smoke Rock
2017	"Gotta Be More"	Nick Grant	Return of the Cool
2017	"Everything"	MoBo The Great	Fuck The Public
2017	"Black & Ugly"	Rapsody	Laila's Wisdom
2017	"Knock on My Door"	Rapsody	Laila's Wisdom
2017	"80s Baby"	Cyhi the Prynce	No Dope On Sundays
2018	"Skrawberries"	JID	DiCaprio 2
2018	"Queen & Slim"	Coast Contra	Queen & Slim
2019	"Forever Your Love"	Common	Let Love
2019	"Memories of Home"	Common, Samora Pinderhughes	Let Love
2019	"go girl"	Luke James, Ro James	to feel love/d
2019	"Only Human"	Lecrae	Restoration
2020	"Hood Living"	RILEY	RILEY
2020	"Changes"	Lute	Gold Mouf
2024	"Fore Play"	Snoop Dogg	Missionary
2024	"Now or Never"	Snoop Dogg, Dr. Dre	Missionary
2025	"The Negro Problem"	Chance the Rapper	Star Line
2025	"Speed of Light"	Chance the Rapper, Lion Babe	Star Line
