= Deeper (EP) =

EP by MadGibbs
- Released: September 24, 2013
- Recorded: 2013
- Genre: Hip-hop
- Length: 15:49
- Label: Madlib Invazion
- Producer: Madlib

MadGibbs chronology
Shame (2012)	Deeper (2013)	Piñata (2014)

Freddie Gibbs chronology
ESGN (2013)	Deeper (2013)	Piñata (2014)

Madlib chronology
Rock Konducta 45 (2013)	Deeper (2013)	Rock Konducta Vol. 1 (2013)

Singles from Deeper
- 1. "Deeper" Released: September 24, 2013

Deeper is the third EP by hip-hop duo MadGibbs, which consists of Indiana rapper Freddie Gibbs and California hip-hop musician Madlib. It was released on September 24, 2013, through Madlib Invazion. Following up on their EPs Thuggin' (2011) and Shame (2012), it serves as the final EP in the trilogy before the release of their full-length LP, Piñata (2014).

On the EP, "Deeper" is an ode to hip-hop in the mold of Common's "I Used to Love H.E.R.". Gibbs showcases the yin and yang of heartbreak and anger on the title track which is the tale of two men and the women that "cut them deep." The B-side, "Harold's", is a nostalgic ode to the famous Harold's Chicken Shack – most known for their Chicago locations, but also located in Gibbs' hometown of Gary, Indiana – that served as the backdrop to many of his seminal life experiences.

== Music video ==
On June 3, 2014, Madlib Invazion published the title track's music video online. The clip, directed by Jonah Schwartz, forms a trilogy with the story begun with the two previous videos, "Thuggin'" and "Shame". On said "loose" trilogy story arc, Gibbs' is shown running a drug operation and spending time with his girlfriend, before being sent to prison for a lengthy period. Upon getting his freedom, Gibbs discovers that she has connected with another man in his absence, and also has a son, presumably his.

== Critical response ==
The title track was well received by music critics and was considered as one of Piñata's standout tracks. For James Elliott, "Deeper" is a standout because of its "weightiness". Writing of Earmilk, Elliott described Freddie Gibbs' style as "deceptively simple, thanks to [its] direct and blunt nature." He explained that rather than overwhelming listeners with "metaphors piled atop metaphors," or sweeping them away "with allusions to ancient religious scrolls and nostalgic myths from the past", Gibbs chooses to give them "the story how it happened, painting a vivid image of his reality with stark simplicity." Elliott remarks that "Freddie Gibbs and Madlib are more than an odd couple, they are a great pair." He observed that "Deeper" contains both of their signature techniques: with Gibbs letting listeners understand his pain with bluntness and Madlib finding strange samples to creatively use in production." Michael K., writer for The Come Up Show, highlighted Gibbs' "ability to flow so effortlessly over a story telling track," giving listeners "a record that knocks but also has substance", and claimed that he "always comes correct on the track and Madlib's production puts this effort over the top." Jordan Darville of Chart Attack noted that the EP's title track "gives a rare look at the softer side of Gangsta Gibbs, an on-mic persona known for his vociferous championing of his drug lord status and violent solutions. But here, he's heartbroken." He wrote that "Gibbs' effortless narrative does most of the legwork, though Madlib's warm soul beat provides a good dose of honeyed heartache."

== Track listing ==
No.	Title	Writer(s)	Length
1.	"Deeper"	Fredrick Tipton, Otis Jackson	3:10
2.	"Deeper (Instrumental)"	O. Jackson	3:08
3.	"Ups and Downs (Bonus Beat)"	O. Jackson	2:31
4.	"Harold's"	F. Tipton, O. Jackson	2:49
5.	"Harold's (Instrumental)"	O. Jackson	2:52
6.	"The Long Walk Home (Bonus Beat)"	O. Jackson	1:19

Notes

- All tracks are produced by Madlib.
- "Deeper" contains a sample of "A Fool For You" as performed by The Legends, used courtesy of Curtis McCormick.
