= Superfly (soundtrack) =

Superfly (Original Motion Picture Soundtrack)

Soundtrack album by Future and various artists
- Released: June 8, 2018
- Genres: Hip hop; trap
- Length: 77:19
- Labels: Freebandz; A1; Epic; CTMG
- Producers: Future (exec.); 9th Wonder; Andrew Watt; ATL Jacob; Bangladesh; Bryan Torres; Cameron Hale; Cubeatz; Dale Play; Diego Ave; DJ Burn One; DJ SwanQo; Dre Moon; DtownThaGreat; DY; Happy Perez; Hiko Momoji; Jambo; Lil Jon; Richie Souf; Rick Nowels; Sean "The Pen" Garrett; Southside; The Five Points Bakery; The Runners; Wheezy; Will A Fool; XL; Young Chop; Zaytoven

Future chronology
| Super Slimey (2017) | Superfly (Original Motion Picture Soundtrack) (2018) | Beast Mode 2 (2018) |

Singles from Superfly (Original Motion Picture Soundtrack)
- 1. "No Shame" Released: May 4, 2018

The soundtrack for the 2018 crime film Superfly was curated by American rapper Future, who also acted as a producer on the film. It features guest appearances from Miguel, Lil Wayne, Khalid, Young Thug, PartyNextDoor, H.E.R., Gunna, Sleepy Brown, and Yung Bans, among others.

== Background and release ==
In an interview with AllHipHop, the film's director Director X stated,

I wanted the current sound of Atlanta, so I hunted [Future] down. We were doing the Gap commercial with him and Cher. I normally don't mix things up, but we just started talking about [working on Superfly] on set.

On June 15, 2018, the second half of the album was released with an addition of ten tracks.

== Singles ==
Future released the first single for the album, "No Shame" featuring PartyNextDoor, on May 4, 2018, as the lead single. A second song by Future featuring Yung Bans called "Bag" was released later in the month, as the lead promotional single. On June 5, 2018, "This Way" by Khalid and H.E.R. was released as the album's second promotional single, followed by "Walk On Minks" by Future on June 6, 2018, as the third promotional single. The album was released on June 8, 2018.

== Commercial performance ==
Superfly Original Motion Picture Soundtrack debuted at number 25 on the Billboard 200 based on 17 million streams of its songs and 5,000 pure album sales, which Billboard equated to 15,000 album-equivalent units.

== Track listing ==
Credits adapted from Tidal.

Disc 1
| No. | Title | Writer(s) | Producer(s) | Length |
|---|---|---|---|---|
| 1. | "If You Want It" (performed by Sleepy Brown featuring Scar) | Terrence Smith; Patrick Brown; Richard Brown; Walter Williams; David Sweeten; Rose Offord; Darryl James; Siraaj Rhett; Emiko Bankson; Preston Crump; Marvin Parkman; John Conner | DJ Burn One; The Five Points Bakery | 4:37 |
| 2. | "What's Up With That" (performed by Future featuring 21 Savage) | Nayvadius Wilburn; Shayaa Joseph; Tony Son | Richie Souf | 3:02 |
| 3. | "No Shame" (performed by Future featuring PartyNextDoor) | Wilburn; Jahron Brathwaite; Andrew Wotman; Nathan Perez | Andrew Watt; Happy Perez | 3:54 |
| 4. | "Walk on Minks" (performed by Future) | Wilburn; Xavier Dotson | Zaytoven | 3:38 |
| 5. | "Tie My Shoes" (performed by Future featuring Young Thug) | Wilburn; Jeffery Williams; Dwan Avery; Mario Martinez, Jr. | DY | 3:01 |
| 6. | "Stains" (performed by Future) | Wilburn; Tyree Pittman | Young Chop | 3:02 |
| 7. | "Show My Chain Some Love" (performed by Future featuring Young Thug) | Wilburn; Williams; Willie Byrd | Will A Fool | 2:32 |
| 8. | "R.A.N." (performed by Miguel) | Miguel Pimentel; Rick Nowels | Nowels; Miguel; Mighty Mike^{[a]} | 4:03 |
| 9. | "This Way" (performed by Khalid with H.E.R.) | Khalid Robinson; Gabi Wilson; Atilla Elçi; Cameron Lazar; Solomon Fagenson | Hiko Momoji; Cameron Hale | 3:31 |
| 10. | "Bag" (performed by Future featuring Yung Bans) | Wilburn; Vas Coleman; Trevon Campbell; Bryan Talancon | XL; Bryan Torres | 3:16 |
| 11. | "Drive Itself" (performed by Future featuring Lil Wayne) | Wilburn; Dwayne Carter; Avery | DY | 3:34 |
| 12. | "Money Train" (performed by Future featuring Young Thug and Gunna) | Wilburn; Williams; Sergio Kitchens; Wesley Glass; Tim Gomringer; Kevin Gomringer | Wheezy; Cubeatz | 2:44 |
| 13. | "Nowhere" (performed by Future) | Wilburn; Jacob Canady | ATL Jacob | 4:30 |
| Total length: | | | | 45:24 |

Disc 2
| No. | Title | Writer(s) | Producer(s) | Length |
|---|---|---|---|---|
| 1. | "Trappin' So Hard" (performed by Rich the Kid with Rico Love) | Dimitri Roger; Rico Love; Diego Avendano | Diego Ave; Love | 2:47 |
| 2. | "New Goals" (performed by French Montana) | Karim Kharbouch; Dwayne Nesmith; Love | DtownThaGreat; The Runners; Love | 4:01 |
| 3. | "That's How I Grew Up" (performed by G Herbo featuring 21 Savage) | Herbert Wright; Joseph; Luellen | Southside | 3:40 |
| 4. | "Rep Yo Click" (performed by Lil Jon featuring Bangladesh, Freeway and Cyhi the Prynce) | Jonathan Smith; Shondrae Crawford; Leslie Pridgen; Cydel Young | Bangladesh; Lil Jon | 3:30 |
| 5. | "Please Forgive" (performed by Lecrae with Sean Garrett and Crystal Nicole) | Wilburn; Lecrae Devaughn Moore; Garrett Hamler; Crystal Nicole; Dotson | Zaytoven; Sean "The Pen" Garrett | 2:40 |
| 6. | "Capone Suite" (performed by Rick Ross featuring Smif-N-Wessun) | William Roberts II; Darrell Yates; Patrick Douthit; Tekomin Williams; Skip Scarborough | 9th Wonder | 4:53 |
| 7. | "Struggles" (performed by Future featuring Sleepy Brown) | Wilburn; Brown; Andre Proctor; Cannon Garnett, Jr. | Dre Moon | 2:26 |
| 8. | "Find My Way Out" (performed by HoodCelebrityy) | Tina Pinnock; Joshua Exantus; James Steed; Klenord Raphael | DJ SwanQo | 2:45 |
| 9. | "La Dueña" (performed by A. Chal) | Alejandro Salazar; Jorge Fonseca; Mario Cáceres | Dale Play | 2:30 |
| 10. | "Georgia" (performed by Future featuring Young Thug) | Wilburn; Williams; Canady; Raúl Bermejo | ATL Jacob; Jambo | 2:43 |
| Total length: | | | | 77:19 |

Notes

- ^{^[a]} signifies a co-producer
- "No Shame" features background vocals from Andrew Watt
- "New Goals" features vocals from Rico Love

== Additional personnel ==
Credits adapted from Tidal.

Musicians

- Rose Offord – bongo (track 1)
- Andrew Watt – bass, guitar, keyboards, programming (track 3)
- Happy Perez – bass, keyboards, programming (track 3)
- Chad Smith – drums (track 3)
- Rick Nowels – electric guitar, organ, piano (track 8)
- Dean Reid – bass, keyboards, synthesizer (track 8)
- Tyler Lydell – drums, percussion (track 1)
- Mighty Mike – bass, drums, piano (track 8)
- Miguel – drums (track 8)
- Zac Rae – bass (track 8)
- Dave Palmer – keyboards (track 8)
- Dave Levita – guitar (track 8)
- Patrick Warren – strings (track 8)
- Hiko Momoji – bass, keyboards (track 9)
- Cameron Hale – guitar (track 9)
- Solomon Fagenson – bass (track 9)

Production

- Andrew "Schwifty" Luftman – production coordination (track 3)
- Zvi "Angry Beard Man" Edelman – production coordination (track 3)
- Sarah "Goodie Bag" Shelton – production coordination (track 3)

Technical

- David Rodriguez – recording (track 3)
- Eric Manco – recording (tracks 3, 13, 20)
- David "Prep" Hughes – recording (track 3)
- Miki Tsutsumi – recording (track 9)
- Tiggi – recording (track 9)
- Mark "Spike" Stent – mixing (track 3)
- Şerban Ghenea – mixing (track 8)
- Denis Kosiak – mixing (track 9)
- Michael Freeman – engineering (track 3)
- Dean Reid – engineering (track 8)
- Kieron Menzies – engineering (track 8)
- Trevor Yasuda – engineering (track 8)
- Chris Rockwell – engineering (track 8)
- John Hanes – engineering (track 8)
- Geoff Swan – engineering (track 3)
- Alex Spencer – assistant engineering (track 9)
- Mike Roett – assistant engineering (track 13)
- Glenn Schick – mastering (track 3)
- Chris Athens – mastering (track 8)

−

- Colin Leonard – uncredited mastering (tracks 1–13)

== Charts ==
=== Weekly charts ===
| Chart (2018) | Peak position |
|---|---|
| Canadian Albums (Billboard) | 51 |
| US Billboard 200 | 25 |
| US Top R&B/Hip-Hop Albums (Billboard) | 13 |
| US Soundtrack Albums (Billboard) | 3 |

=== Year-end charts ===
| Chart (2018) | Position |
|---|---|
| US Soundtrack Albums (Billboard) | 24 |
