= Str8 Killa No Filla (mixtape) =

Mixtape by Freddie Gibbs
- Released: July 29, 2010
- Genres: Hip hop; gangsta rap
- Length: 66:06
- Label: G.I.B.B.S Inc
- Producer: Rome (BYI Ent.) DVLP LA Riot Masta Ace Block Beattaz FingerRoll B Flat Trax DJ Burn One SMKA Statik Selektah Speakerbomb Koncept Josh The Goon Mufi (Milkbone K-Salaam Beatnick

Freddie Gibbs chronology
Playa - EP (2009)	Str8 Killa No Filla (2010)	Str8 Killa (2010)

Str8 Killa No Filla is a mixtape by American rapper Freddie Gibbs. It was released on July 29, 2010. The project was presented and distributed in collaboration with magazine XXL. The mixtape contains feature appearances from fellow 2010 XXL Freshman class members, Jay Rock and Pill as well as Big Kill, L.E.P., Bogus Boys and D-Edge, VP, Planet Asia, Sick Jacken and Bun B and production credits from Rome (BYI Ent.), DVLP, LA Riot, Masta Ace, Block Beattaz, FingerRoll, B Flat Trax, DJ Burn One, SMKA, Statik Selektah, Speakerbomb, Koncept, Josh The Goon, Mufi (Miilkbone), K-Salaam, Beatnick.

On August 3, 2010, Gibbs released the "Str8 Killa EP", which served as commercial release of the project with significantly shorter tracklist.

The project is presented by Statik Selektah, DJ Burn One and Josh the Goon, who all have their producer tags play at start of each song. Statik Selektah, who also serves as DJ narrator of the project would latter collaborate with Gibbs again on their collaborative EP, "Lord Giveth, Lord Taketh Away".

The album cover pays homage to the album Equal Rights by Peter Tosh, similarly how other projects by Gibbs released in this time reference classic albums, with his previous mixtapes "Miseducation Of Freddie Gibbs" taking inspiration from Lauryn Hill’s debut "The Miseducation of Lauryn Hill", "Midwestgangstaboxframecadillacmuzik" taking inspiration from OutKast's "Southernplayalisticadillacmuzik" and his compilation "The Labels Tryin’ to Kill Me!" paying homage to "The Ghettos Tryin’ to Kill Me!" by Master P.

== Background ==
Following his inclusion in the XXL magazine's 2010 Freshman Class and a highly successful run at the SXSW music festival, Freddie Gibbs gained more popularity in the hip-hop scene. “It’s vital. Without that, without blog exposure, I wouldn’t exist,”

Describing music of other rappers making mixtapes as “b*llshit” , he would “rather give a cohesive piece of music that tells a story.” “Not enough people know me. I still have to tell them who Gibbs is. Whether it’s about robbing and jacking, or pussy, I incorporate the story in the rhymes, like you could put it to a movie.”

Gibbs deliberately chose to rap over more uncommon and classic hip-hop instrumentals from the 1990s and 2000s. He explained that classic records kept him motivated as an MC, noting that he had not been inspired by much of the new rap released in the current era. “I ain’t been motivated by a lot of [new] rap for the last five years.”

The project also features guest appearances from fellow 2010 XXL freshman Jay Rock. The two artists struck up a friendship at the magazine's cover shoot and recorded their collaborative track, "Rep To Tha Fullest", in Los Angeles just a week later.

== EP and sample clearance ==
The week following the release, the EP version of the project came out. It contains 6 out of the 21 songs present on the mixtape, while adding two new ones, "The Coldest" and "Oil Money". The project was his first retail release. The reason for this is that the mixtape contains few songs using beats and samples from classic records.

"Gangsta Gibbs has dropped an accompanying mixtape, which includes six of the songs from the EP as well as a bunch of songs that might have been a pain to clear—most notably, "Slangin' Rocks," a hilarious, gangstafied reworking of the Whispers' Rock Steady."

In the interview for Complex, Gibbs commented that: "Only reason Str8 Killa is an EP is because we just wanna sell it. And we couldn't sell all the records that was on the mixtape."

== Critical reception ==
Str8 Killa No Filla received favorable reviews from the critics. In PopMatters, David Amidon rated it 8 out of 10 and noted "it’s really hard to complain about a guy that puts so much obvious work into his craft". In Rolling Stone, Christian Hoard said "He's also poised to become hip-hop's next big thing, having generated serious heat with mixtapes like this"

Peter Macia of Fader wrote: "Even if we wanted to (we don't) we couldn't find much not to love on here, and we're pretty sure you'll feel the same way. The only problem we have is that we have to listen to it hunched over a laptop instead of riding down Sunset in a Cadillac convertible."

B.Dot ranked Str8 Killa No Filla as fifth best mixtape of 2010 for Rap Radar. "Freddie kicks things off with his own unapologetic national anthem “Fuck The World” and then, a few tracks down, “Reps 2 to Tha Fullest” with Jay Rock . In terms of lyrical content, Fred’s strength is woven within his baritone flow. He shows his range on “Do Wrong” with Pill, personalizes Mikbone’s seminal hit (“Ghetto”), and then hits the block hard with “Slammin” and “My Hood”. The only real downside is that damn 30 second snippet of “Rock Bottom” featuring Bun B. What a tease. Be prepared to spend A Cold Day In Hell with the Gangsta later this year."

josh keller described it as "...a raucous 21 track opus that solidified his entry from underground thespian to legit contender for the hard-rock crown."

Professional ratings
Review scores
Source	Rating
Pop Matters	8/10

== Track listing ==
All tracks are written by Freddie Gibbs.

No.	Title	Producer(s)	Length
1.	"Dollar$ 4 Dope (Intro)"	Rome (BYI Ent.)	2:35
2.	"Face Down"	DVLP	1:53
3.	"National Anthem (Fuck The World)"	LA Riot	3:06
4.	"Born 2 Roll"	Masta Ace	1:47
5.	"Str8 Killa No Filla" (featuring Big Kill)	Block Beattaz	2:44
6.	"In My Hood" (featuring L.E.P, Bogus Boys)	FingerRoll	4:29
7.	"Rep 2 Tha Fullest" (featuring Jay Rock)	B Flat Trax, DJ Burn One	4:04
8.	"Slammin'"	SMKA	2:21
9.	"Live By The Game"	Block Beattaz	2:41
10.	"Serve Or Get Served (Interlude)"	Statik Selektah	1:43
11.	"P.S.A. (Pussy So Amazin')"	DJ Burn One	3:57
12.	"Personal OG"	Block Beattaz	2:58
13.	"Best Friend"	Speakerbomb	3:12
14.	"Do Wrong"	DJ Burn One	3:39
15.	"My City" (featuring D-Edge, VP)	Koncept	4:43
16.	"Crushin' Feelin's"	Statik Selektah	3:07
17.	"Goon Shit" (featuring Planet Asia, Sick Jacken)	Josh The Goon	3:38
18.	"The Ghetto"	Mufi (Miilkbone)	3:03
19.	"Rock Bottom" (featuring Bun B)	K-Salaam, Beatnick	3:07
20.	"4681 Broadway"	LA Riot	3:19
21.	"Slangin' Rocks"	Speakerbomb	3:51
Total length:			66:07

=== Notes ===
- Song "Born 2 Roll" uses the beat from the song "Sittin' on Chrome" by Masta Ace.
- Song "Slammin'" uses the beat from the song "G-Shit" by Webbie.
- "Crushin' Feelin's" uses the beat from the song "To the Top (Stick 2 the Script)" by Statik Selektah.
- Song "The Ghetto" uses the beat from the song "Keep It Real" by Miilkbone.
