= ESGN (disambiguation) =

ESGN may refer to:

- ESGN navigation system USS Baton Rouge (SSN-689)
  - Electrostatically Supported Gyro Navigator Ohio-class submarine
- Esgn, Ensign (rank)
- ESGN List of airports in Sweden Brännebrona Airport
- ESports Global Network (ESGN). Dan Stemkoski etc.
- ESGN (album), the debut studio album by American rapper Freddie Gibbs.
