= Thaddeus Matthews =

American pastor and broadcaster (1957–2025)

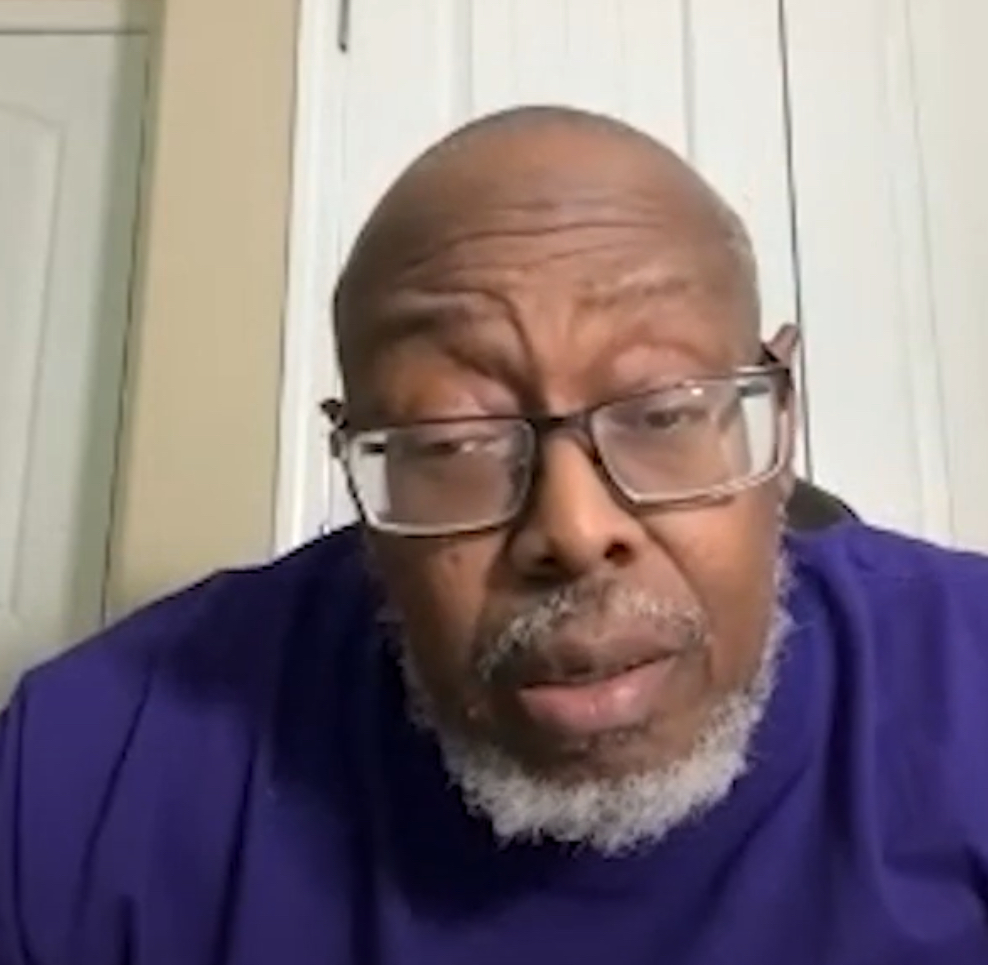
- Matthews in 2023
- Born: Thaddeus Augustus Matthews; April 1, 1957; Memphis, Tennessee, U.S.
- Died: February 24, 2025 (aged 67)
- Occupations: Pastor; broadcaster
- Known for: Explicit preaching

Thaddeus Augustus Matthews (April 1, 1957 – February 24, 2025), also known as "The Cussing Pastor", was an American pastor and broadcaster who gained popularity for using profanity in his preaching.

== Career ==
Born April 1, 1957 in Memphis, Tennessee, Matthews gained popularity in December 2017 after a Facebook livestream where he went on a vulgar rant on cursing in religion. In 2018, he was featured in an episode of Tosh.0. An Instagram video of his, titled "I Don't Give a Shit Saturday", was sampled for the song "Situations" on the album Bandana by Freddie Gibbs & Madlib.

== Controversy ==
In 2016, Matthews was accused by a woman of harassing her, to which he responded by saying she was lying. That same year, he was arrested for harassment after he posted nude photos of himself to a blog.

In 2019, Matthews received criticism after holding a twerking contest at his church. That same year, he got into an argument with singer and television personality K. Michelle. He also made homophobic remarks towards Davin Clemons, an LGBTQ police officer who ran for the Memphis City Council.

In 2022, Matthews turned himself in to the Memphis Police Department after using social media for sexual harassment, a violation of a restraining order placed by an ex-girlfriend.

== Death ==
Matthews died on February 24, 2025, aged 67, from congestive heart failure.
