= Bandana (album) =

2019 studio album by Freddie Gibbs and Madlib

Studio album by Freddie Gibbs & Madlib
- Released: June 28, 2019
- Recorded: 2016–2019
- Genres: Hip-hop; gangsta rap
- Length: 46:17
- Labels: ESGN; Madlib Invazion; Keep Cool; RCA
- Producer: Madlib

Freddie Gibbs & Madlib chronology
Knicks (2014)	Bandana (2019)	Montana (TBA)

Freddie Gibbs chronology
Flat Tummy Tea EP (2019)	Bandana (2019)	Alfredo (2020)

Madlib chronology
Bad Neighbor (2015)	Bandana (2019)	The Professionals (2020)

Singles from Bandana
- 1. "Flat Tummy Tea" Released: February 20, 2019; 2. "Crime Pays" Released: May 30, 2019; 3. "Giannis" Released: June 13, 2019

Bandana is the second collaborative studio album by American rapper Freddie Gibbs and record producer Madlib. It was released on June 28, 2019, by ESGN, Keep Cool Records, Madlib Invazion, and RCA Records. Entirely produced by Madlib, it is the follow-up to their critically acclaimed 2014 album Piñata, and their sixth overall project as a duo. The album features guest appearances from Pusha T, Killer Mike, Anderson .Paak, Yasiin Bey, and Black Thought.

== Background ==
During Madlib's talk with Red Bull Music Academy on May 7, 2016, he announced that he and Freddie Gibbs will be releasing a second collaborative studio album called Bandana. On May 11, 2019, Freddie Gibbs and Madlib announced that Bandana will be the second installment of a planned trilogy, following Piñata, and that the third project will be called Montana.

Gibbs has described the album as a "manifesto", stating that he wrote the majority of his lyrics while incarcerated and expecting to "go away for ten years". His lyrical content on the album has been described as "veer[ing] between cynicism and empathy".

The day after the album's release, Madlib tweeted that he made all the beats for Bandana on his iPad.

== Promotion and release ==
Gibbs and Madlib released the lead single "Flat Tummy Tea" on February 20, 2019. A titular non-album single, "Bandana" featuring the dancehall artist Assassin, was released on March 5, 2019.

On May 28, 2019, the official album cover was revealed, featuring Madlib's animated alter-ego Quasimoto wearing a bandana around his neck and sitting on a zebra as they watch buildings in Hollywood being set on fire. On May 30, the second single "Crime Pays" was released along with the album's release date being confirmed for June 28.

The third single, "Giannis" featuring rapper Anderson .Paak, was released on June 13, 2019.

Released in December 2019, Freddie Gibbs and Madlib performed a short set for the NPR Tiny Desk series, backed by New York soul band El Michels Affair. The following year, they joined El Michels Affair at their Long Island City studio to record The Diamond Mine Sessions, three new versions of tracks for Amazon Music.

== Critical reception ==
Professional ratings
Aggregate scores
Source	Rating
AnyDecentMusic?	8.1/10
Metacritic	88/100
Review scores
Source	Rating
AllMusic	4.5/5 stars
The A.V. Club	B+
Consequence	A−
Exclaim!	9/10
Financial Times	4/5 stars
The Guardian	5/5 stars
NME	5/5 stars
Pitchfork	8.1/10
Q	4/5 stars
Rolling Stone	4/5 stars

Bandana was met with widespread critical acclaim. At Metacritic, which assigns a normalized rating out of 100 to reviews from professional publications, the album received an average score of 88, based on 23 reviews. Aggregator AnyDecentMusic? gave it 8.1 out of 10, based on their assessment of the critical consensus.

Accompanied by a perfect score, Dean Van Nguyen of The Guardian described the album as "unvarnished and utterly dazzling hip-hop", highlighting Gibbs's performance and the production and direction of Madlib. Thomas Hobbs of NME labelled Bandana the "best rap album of 2019", praising Gibbs's improved lyricism compared to Piñata and Madlib's inventive use of samples: "On Bandana, Gibbs hits another level as a lyricist. He still makes an art out of violent imagery (on the potent "Flat Tummy Tea" he threatens to stab "white Jesus" with a sword), but now has developed much more of a philosophical edge, too. Gibbs' bars, with which he triumphantly talks about going from food stamps to making millions, are inspiring and have a real resilience about them." Hobbs concluded: "The chemistry between Madlib and Gibbs is perfect and there's a timelessness to these songs that will make you think of raw black cinematic worlds such as Super Fly or Truck Turner. Gibbs is basically Isaac Hayes if he could spit a hot 16, his union with Madlib proves opposites really do attract." Christopher Thiessen of Consequence saying "From beginning to end, Bandana is a perfectly-paced album. Madlib never lingers on a single musical idea as he chops samples and switches beats, often midway through songs. Meanwhile, Gibbs, an expert in flows and rhythms, glues each song together with his undaunted, straightforward performances, which offer an illusion of effortlessness".

Kyle Mullin of Exclaim! concluded that Bandana "stands on its own as one of the very best rap albums of 2019, or any other year in recent memory", praising the album's guest appearances and production. Jack Bray of The Line of Best Fit stated: "It is an exceptional modern hip-hop album unafraid of exploring the darker sides of the modern rap persona, all whilst creating a rich, textured sonic environment within which it can be best ingested." Clayton Purdom of The A.V. Club said, "The first record was a grower, gradually establishing itself as one of the great producer-emcee efforts of the young millennium, but Bandana seems designed to dazzle, to assert a joint legacy". Pitchfork's critic Stephen Kearse said, "For Bandana, the pair taps into that heritage and allow themselves to be shaped by its highs and lows, its heroes and villains. Finding themselves within that slipstream of black thought and life, they plot their course on their terms. Bandana is tradition and transgression: one rapper, one producer, no limitations".

=== Rankings ===
Select rankings of Bandana
Publication	List	Rank	Ref.
The A.V. Club	50 Favorite Albums of the 2010s	35	
The A.V. Club	The 20 Best Albums of 2019	4	
Clash	Clash Albums of the Year 2019	24	
Complex	Best Albums of 2019	2	
The Line of Best Fit	The Best Albums of 2019	40	
Noisey	The 100 Best Albums of 2019	57	
Rolling Stone	The 200 Greatest Hip-Hop Albums of All Time	197	
Slant Magazine	The 25 Best Albums of 2019	14	
Spin	10 Best Albums of 2019	6	
Stereogum	Best Albums of 2019	30	
Uproxx	The Best Albums of 2019	29	

== Commercial performance ==
Bandana debuted on number 21 on the US Billboard 200 and number 13 on the Top R&B/Hip-Hop Albums chart, with 18,000 album-equivalent units in its first week.

== Track listing ==
All tracks produced by Madlib.

Bandana track listing
No.	Title	Writer(s)	Length
1.	"Obrigado"	Fredrick Tipton; Otis Jackson	0:29
2.	"Freestyle Shit"	Tipton; Jackson	2:28
3.	"Half Manne Half Cocaine"	Tipton; Jackson; Frank Dukes; Denzie Beagle; Winston Riley; Wilbert Williams	3:12
4.	"Crime Pays"	Tipton; Jackson; Mary Ellen Haberman; Steve Haberman	3:02
5.	"Massage Seats"	Tipton; Jackson	2:26
6.	"Palmolive" (featuring Pusha T and Killer Mike)	Tipton; Jackson; Terrence Thornton; Michael Render; Leon Sylvers III	4:05
7.	"Fake Names"	Tipton; Jackson; Sylvers III	3:44
8.	"Flat Tummy Tea"	Tipton; Jackson	2:34
9.	"Situations"	Tipton; Jackson	3:48
10.	"Giannis" (featuring Anderson .Paak)	Tipton; Jackson; Brandon Anderson; Sachin Dev Burman; Majrooh Sultanpuri; James Brown; Alfred James Ellis	3:18
11.	"Practice"	Tipton; Jackson; Donny Hathaway	2:54
12.	"Cataracts"	Tipton; Jackson	3:39
13.	"Gat Damn"	Tipton; Jackson	2:50
14.	"Education" (featuring Yasiin Bey and Black Thought)	Tipton; Jackson; Dante Smith; Tariq Trotter; Rahul Dev Burman	4:22
15.	"Soul Right"	Tipton; Jackson; Malcolm Catto; Jake Ferguson; Mike Burnham	3:26
Total length:			46:17

Samples

- "Freestyle Shit" contains a sample from "Elastic Lover", as performed by Revelation Funk.
- "Half Manne Half Cocaine" contains samples of "Gregorian", written and performed by Frank Dukes; "Dust a Sound Boy", written by Denzie Beagle, Winston Riley, and Wilbert Williams, as performed by Super Beagle; and "Graveyard Ismael", written by Dominique Di Rienzo, as performed by Alpha Centori.
- "Crime Pays" contains a sample from "Free Spirit", written by Mary Ellen Haberman and Steve Haberman, as performed by Walt Barr.
- "Massage Seats" contains a sample from "Dance Hall Pt. 1", as performed by Tenor Saw.
- "Palmolive" and "Fake Names" contain a sample from "Cry of a Dreamer", written by Leon Sylvers III, as performed by the Sylvers.
- "Flat Tummy Tea" contains a portion of the composition "Orbit", written by Kaidi Tatham, as performed by Agent K; contains samples from "Love Theme from The Godfather", as performed by Professionals; and "Different Strokes", as performed by Syl Johnson.
- "Situations" contains a vocal sample of "I Don't Give a Shit Saturday", an Instagram video by Thaddeus Matthews, or known as "The Cussing Pastor".
- "Giannis" contains samples from "Aasman Ke Neeche", written by S. D. Burman and Majrooh Sultanpuri, as performed by Lata Mangeshkar and Kishore Kumar; and "Say It Loud – I'm Black and I'm Proud", written by James Brown and Alfred James Ellis, as performed by James Brown.
- "Practice" contains a sample from "Make It on Your Own", written and performed by Donny Hathaway.
- "Cataracts" contains a sample from "Teach Me How", written by Norman Whiteside, as performed by Wee.
- "Education" contains a sample from "Mukti Music", written and performed by R. D. Burman.
- "Soul Right" contains a sample from "Noises and Conversations", written by Malcolm Catto, Jake Ferguson, and Mike Burnham, as performed by the Heliocentrics.

== Charts ==
Chart performance for Bandana
Chart (2019)	Peak position
Australian Albums (ARIA)	61
Belgian Albums (Ultratop Flanders)	95
Canadian Albums (Billboard)	47
Dutch Albums (Album Top 100)	63
Finnish Albums (Suomen virallinen lista)	50
German Albums (Offizielle Top 100)	82
Irish Albums (IRMA)	85
Norwegian Albums (VG-lista)	31
Scottish Albums (Official Charts)	57
Swiss Albums (Schweizer Hitparade)	30
UK Albums (Official Charts)	88
UK R&B Albums (Official Charts)	10
US Billboard 200	21
US Top R&B/Hip-Hop Albums (Billboard)	13
