= Cold Day in Hell (mixtape) =

Mixtape by Freddie Gibbs
- Released: October 31, 2011
- Genres: Hip-hop; gangsta rap
- Length: 58:22
- Label: Corporate Thugz
- Producers: Big K.R.I.T.; J.U.S.T.I.C.E. League; Speakerbomb; Beatnick; K-Salaam; Cardo; The Olympicks; Block Beattaz; Arkatech Beatz; SC; SMKA; DJ Burn One; Mike Will

Freddie Gibbs chronology
| Lord Giveth, Lord Taketh Away (2011) | Cold Day in Hell (2011) | Thuggin' (2011) |

Professional ratings
Review scores
| Source | Rating |
|---|---|
| About.Com | 4/5 stars |
| The A.V. Club | B+ |
| Consequence of Sound | 4/5 stars |
| Pitchfork Media | (8.2/10) |
| XXL | (XL) |

Cold Day in Hell is a mixtape by American rapper Freddie Gibbs. It was released on October 31, 2011. It was recorded between 2009 and 2011 with stops and assistance by Young Jeezy's Corporate Thugz. The mixtape features guest appearances from Young Jeezy himself, alongside other artists such as Dom Kennedy, Freeway, Juicy J, Sly Polaroid, Alley Boy, 2 Chainz and Scrilla, among others.

== Background ==
Following his inclusion in the 2010 XXL Freshman Class and the release of the Str8 Killa EP, Freddie Gibbs signed with Young Jeezy’s CTE World label in early 2011. Cold Day in Hell was his first project released under the label.

It was originally supposed to release on his birthday, June 14, but was delayed.

"...if I feel like I wanna take a little more time to add more shit, I can do that. Everything that I’m doing is a calculated decision. If I feel like I need to make it better then I’m gonna make it better. The shit might be great to other people’s standards, but if I don’t think it’s ready, it ain’t comin’ out."

== Critical reception ==
Cold Day in Hell received positive reviews from critics. David Drake of Pichfork commented that "Cold Day in Hell is arguably his most well-rounded, accomplished offering. It isn't that he's improved as a rapper, but as an artist. He has recognized his weaknesses and produced a lush, versatile record that works around them." rating the project 8,2/10.

The review from XXL magazine noted that "With a gangster’s psyche, the rapid-fire delivery of an automatic weapon, and a chip on his shoulder, Freddie Gibbs is reviving the spirit of the gangster rapper with a conscience."

== Track listing ==
| No. | Title | Producer(s) | Length |
|---|---|---|---|
| 1. | "Barely M.A.D.E. It" (featuring BJ the Chicago Kid) | J.U.S.T.I.C.E. League | 3:02 |
| 2. | "Rob Me a Nigga" (featuring Alley Boy) | Big K.R.I.T. | 3:54 |
| 3. | "187 Proof" | J.U.S.T.I.C.E. League | 3:12 |
| 4. | "Anything 2 Survive" (featuring Freeway, Sly Polaroid and Adrian) | Beatnick; K-Salaam | 3:58 |
| 5. | "Twos and Fews" (featuring Young Jeezy) | SC | 3:53 |
| 6. | "Let Ya Nuts Hang" (featuring Scrilla) | Arkatech Beatz | 3:00 |
| 7. | "Let ‘Em Burn" | The Olympicks | 3:14 |
| 8. | "B.A.N.ned" | Cardo | 2:56 |
| 9. | "My Homeboy’s Girlfriend" | Cardo | 4:56 |
| 10. | "So Amazin' (P.S.A. Part. 2)" (featuring Sebastian Mego) | Block Beattaz | 3:46 |
| 11. | "Natural High (Even Higher Learning)" | DJ Burn One | 4:50 |
| 12. | "Str8 Slammin'" (featuring Juicy J) | SMKA | 3:32 |
| 13. | "Menace II Society" (featuring Dom Kennedy and Polyester) | Cardo | 3:15 |
| 14. | "Neighborhood Hoes" (featuring 2 Chainz) | Speakerbomb | 3:24 |
| 15. | "Heaven Can Wait" | Beatnick & K-Salaam | 3:24 |
| 16. | "My Dawgz" | Cardo | 4:14 |

Livemixtapes bonus track
| No. | Title | Producer(s) | Length |
|---|---|---|---|
| 17. | "Sittin' Low" (featuring Young Jeezy, Scrilla) (Bonus Track) | Mike Will | 4:31 |

Streaming bonus track
| No. | Title | Producer(s) | Length |
|---|---|---|---|
| 17. | "Where Have You Been?" (featuring Slick Pulla) (Bonus track) | Mike Will | 2:56 |

=== Notes ===
- 17th track "Sittin Low" is replaced with "Where Have You Been?" on the streaming release of the mixtape
