= ESGN =

- iTunes censored cover art. Standard cover doesn't contain censorship.

Studio album by Freddie Gibbs
- Released: June 19, 2013
- Recorded: 2012–13
- Genre: Hip-hop
- Length: 75:56
- Labels: ESGN; Empire
- Producers: Lord Zedd; Lifted; League of Starz; Big Jerm; Sayez; J Reese; Willie B; The Colleagues; SMKA; SAP; GMF; Cardo; Tone Mason; Like O; Fire & Ice; Superville

Freddie Gibbs chronology
Baby Face Killa (2012)	ESGN (2013)	Deeper EP (2013)

Singles from ESGN
- 1. "One Eighty Seven" Released: June 11, 2013

ESGN - Evil Seeds Grow Naturally (also referred to simply as ESGN) is the debut studio album by American rapper Freddie Gibbs. The album was released on June 19, 2013, by ESGN and Empire Distribution. The album features guest appearances from Daz Dillinger, Spice 1, Jay Rock, G-Wiz, Hit "Skrewface", Big Kill, Lil Sodi, Problem, Y.B., D-Edge, G.I. Fleezy and BJ the Chicago Kid.

== Background ==
On March 23, 2013, the first song from the album titled "The Color Purple" was released. In an April 2013, interview with HipHopDX, Freddie Gibbs spoke about when the album would be released, saying:

I'm 'bout to drop that ESGN album probably in June for the summer time, just to hold niggas over before we drop that Cocaine Piñata with Madlib. ESGN is gonna be me, G-Wiz, D-Edge, Hit Screwface, G.I. Fleezy and Big Kill. We putting that shit together right now. It's gonna be kind of on that Jay-Z Dynasty: [Roc La Familia] type shit. I got a lot of records that I like. We're gonna fuse that thing together and make that shit work to show what we're working with collectively. Basically, this album gave me a chance to breathe and breathe fire on mothafuckas I’ve been wanting to breathe fire on. So it’s really giving me a little outlet right now. Once I whack niggas on this mothafuckin' album then I'm gonna fall back on they ass and just chill for the summertime, get my dick sucked and drink drinks with umbrellas and shit in them, nigga. Just like Tony Soprano said, niggas is getting wacked. Niggas is getting clipped. This album is strictly for niggas that's getting they nuts clipped.

On May 14, 2013, Freddie Gibbs announced that his debut album ESGN would be released in July. On May 27, 2013, he announced on his Twitter account that the album would be released on July 9, 2013. On June 11, 2013, the first single from the album "One Eighty Seven" featuring Problem was released. On June 13, 2013, the second song from the album "Freddie Soprano" was released. On June 17, 2013, the music video was released for "Eastside Moonwalker". The album was later released three weeks before its original July 9, release date on June 20, 2013. On July 1, 2013, the music video was released for "Lay It Down". On July 15, 2013, the music video was released for "Have U Seen Her" featuring Hit Screwface. On August 26, 2013, the music video was released for "The Real G Money". On January 8, 2014, the music video was released for "One Eighty Seven" featuring Problem.

== Music, songs and lyrics ==
In June 2013, during an interview with XXL, Freddie Gibbs previewed the album. He spoke about "Eastside Moonwalker", saying: "That's one of the dopest tracks. Shout out to GMF. He produced that. It's showing people that I'm the staple of the game when it comes to Gary [Indiana]. Michael Jackson is dead, so I gotta pick up the torch and run with it for my city. Actually, I am the only person grabbing it. I am just doing what I got to do. I'm the eastside moonwalker. I stay high, baby." He also spoke about "Freddie Soprano", saying: "That's the definitive verse from the album. Basically, telling y'all what it is. How I feel about what's what." He spoke about "F.A.M.E." which features Daz Dillinger and Spice 1, saying: "[The acronym stands for] 'Fuck All My Enemies'. You know who I am talking about. If you an enemy—fuck you. I grew up listening to Daz and Spice-1. If it wasn't for guys like that, I wouldn't be rapping. Any project I do, I try to pay homage to guys that I respect. Last project I fucked with Jadakiss. He's one of the guys that when I came up, I came up listening to. He's still an athlete in this game. He's still one of the best in it. He don't get his credit. I always try to pay homage to the guys that were instrumental in my career with me coming up. That's why I linked up with Daz and Spice-1. [This is a diss] track to anybody who want it. If the shoe fits, wear it. I'm talking shit about all of you niggas. If the shoe fits, wear it. If you pick up the shoe and you put it on. You want to take to Twitter and you want to get on your track and say something about Freddie Gibbs, make sure you got your hardhat on." He spoke about "Lay It Down" which is produced by Willie B, saying: "Shout out to Willie B. He fuck with Jay Rock and them. He produced that shit. That's one of them hard-hitting joints. It's going straight to the point. Lay it down. That's a robbing song." He also spoke about "Have U Seen Her" which features Hit Skrewface, saying: "This is featuring my boy Screwface. SMKA, they produced that. That's one of them bangers. It's hard."

== Critical reception ==
Professional ratings
Aggregate scores
Source	Rating
Metacritic	73/100
Review scores
Source	Rating
Consequence of Sound	4/5 stars
HipHopDX	3.5/5 stars
Pitchfork Media	6.9/10
PopMatters	7/10
XXL	(L)

ESGN received generally positive reviews from music critics. At Metacritic, which assigns a weighted rating out of 100 to reviews from mainstream critics, the album received an average score of 73, which indicates "generally favorable reviews", based on 5 reviews. Anthony Asencio of HipHopDX gave the album three and a half stars out of five, saying "Ultimately, ESGN may not be a cultural event. It doesn't introduce a new sound, nor does it feature many moments we haven't heard before. Yet what makes this album important are all the reasons Hip Hop needs Freddie Gibbs. On any one album, he can give you pieces of Tupac, UGK, Three 6 Mafia, and blend them into a harmony that would make Bone Thugs-n-Harmony proud. And on that point, ESGN is a massive success." Chris Mench of XXL gave the album an L, saying "None of this criticism is to say that ESGN is a bad album. Freddie is a talented rapper with great flow and a wise selection of collaborators, and many songs are individually effective. Rather, it is simply an album that lacks a clear perspective on the many heavy topics it tackles. A first time listener may walk away feeling very familiar with Freddie Gibbs' sound, but still unsure of who exactly he is." David Amidon of PopMatters gave the album a seven out of ten, saying "For those hip-hop fans forever in pursuit of the latest glass-shattering bass and semi-auto mob rules, ESGN is likely 2013's flagship release. This is Gibbs' deep breath; let's see what direction he takes off running in next."

Chris Bosman of Consequence of Sound gave the album four out of five stars, saying "Gibbs' EPs and mixtapes tend to run long, and ESGN – at 19 tracks – is no exception. The length is a weakness. The bleakness of Gibbs' world, even when it's going well, can leave you gasping. The shock is somewhat lost in the number of tracks. In the scheme of the album, it's a minor quibble. ESGN digs new paths through rap's hallowed grounds. It may not be the crossover success that those who ride for Gibbs would love to see, but it doesn't diminish this excellent record." Jonah Bromwich of Pitchfork gave the album a 6.9 out of 10, saying "On "Hundred Thousand", Gibbs supplies a perfect—and, true to form, concise—review of ESGN himself. "Ain't trying to be the man, just trying to maintain." Calling an album "more of the same" sounds dismissive but it's something that fans are often happy to receive and there are those for whom 20 tracks of Gibbs rapping nearly perfectly will be enough. But for everyone else, ESGN comes as an unwelcome reversion to the mean. It's the sound of a rapper more than happy to maintain his narrow lane after being burned by the industry, one who's lost the ambition to leave his comfort zone, at least for the time being."

== Track listing ==
No.	Title	Producer(s)	Length
1.	"Lil' Sodi"	Lord Zedd	1:52
2.	"The Real G Money"	Lifted	3:11
3.	"Came Up"	Lord Zedd	3:46
4.	"Hundred Thousand" (featuring G-Wiz and Hit Skrewface)	League of Starz	3:19
5.	"D.O.A." (featuring G-Wiz and Big Kill)	Big Jerm; Sayez; J Reese	3:12
6.	"Lay It Down"	Willie B	3:17
7.	"I Seen a Man Die" (featuring Lil' Sodi)	The Colleagues	3:38
8.	"Have U Seen Her" (featuring Hit Skrewface)	SMKA	4:01
9.	"One Eighty Seven" (featuring Problem)	SAP	3:29
10.	"Eastside Moonwalker"	GMF	2:46
11.	"F.A.M.E." (featuring Daz Dillinger and Spice 1)	Cardo	4:14
12.	"Paper" (featuring Y.B.)	Lifted	5:32
13.	"The Color Purple"	Tone Mason	3:45
14.	"Certified Live" (featuring G-Wiz and Jay Rock)	Lifted	3:24
15.	"Ten Packs of Backwoods" (featuring D-Edge)	Big Jerm; Sayez	3:13
16.	"Dope in My Styrofoam" (featuring G-Wiz and G.I. Fleezy)	Like O	4:12
17.	"9mm" (featuring G.I. Fleezy and G-Wiz)	Fire & Ice	4:28
18.	"Lose Control" (featuring BJ the Chicago Kid)	Superville	5:53
19.	"Freddie Soprano"	Big Jerm; Sayez	3:56
Total length:			70:58

iTunes Bonus Track
No.	Title	Producer(s)	Length
20.	"Murda Dem" (featuring G.I. Fleezy and Big Kill)	Fire & Ice	4:48
Total length:			75:56

== Charts ==
Chart (2013)	Peak position
US Heatseekers Albums (Billboard)	8
