= Rock Konducta =

Album series by Madlib

Rock Konducta is an album series released by hip-hop musician Madlib. The term "Rock Konducta" comes from Madlib producing hip-hop instrumentals using rock and roll and krautrock samples. The series began officially in 2013 with the introduction of Rock Konducta 45.

== Rock Konducta 45 ==
Rock Konducta 45

EP by Madlib
- Released: June 7, 2013
- Genre: Instrumental hip-hop, rap rock
- Label: Madlib Invazion (Catalog # MMS016)
- Producer: Madlib

Madlib chronology
Shame (2013)	Rock Konducta 45 (2013)	Deeper (2013)

Rock Konducta 45 is the introductory project to the Rock Konducta instrumental albums by hip-hop producer Madlib. It was released on vinyl on Madlib Invazion Records and introduced five selected tracks from the Rock Konducta project.

=== Track listing ===
- All tracks are produced and arranged by Madlib.
1. "Water Or Bread (Raining)"
2. "Licorice (The Beginning)"
3. "The Mad March (Skipping Drunk)"
4. "Stumbling (Cobblestones)"
5. "Welcome (The End)"

== Rock Konducta Pt. 1 ==
Rock Konducta Pt. 1

Studio album by Madlib
- Released: December 5, 2013
- Genre: Instrumental hip-hop, rap rock
- Length: 42:36
- Label: Madlib Invazion (Catalog # MMS020)
- Producer: Madlib

Madlib chronology
Deeper (2013)	Rock Konducta Pt. 1 (2013)	Piñata (2014)

Rock Konducta Pt. 1 is the first full-length album in the Rock Konducta instrumental albums by hip-hop producer Madlib. It features approx. 40 minutes of hip-hop instrumentals made by Madlib using numerous samples from rock, prog rock, krautrock and psychedelic rock songs from the 60s to the 80s.

=== Track listing ===
All tracks produced by Madlib.

No.	Title	Length
1.	"Zucker"	1:06
2.	"Rot"	1:41
3.	"Motorik Matching"	1:24
4.	"Far Faust"	2:09
5.	"Knickers Turned"	1:28
6.	"Gentle Pilz"	1:53
7.	"Black Widow"	2:18
8.	"Giant Okra"	2:11
9.	"Ege Malesch"	1:31
10.	"Soap Guillotine"	1:48
11.	"Hallucination Amon"	1:54
12.	"Siebenjäger"	1:11
13.	"Mantara Guru"	1:00
14.	"Düül Shop"	1:42
15.	"Hold the Organ"	2:29
16.	"Floh"	1:31
17.	"Harmonia Inventions"	1:43
18.	"Crimson"	1:15
19.	"Agitation Musik"	1:32
20.	"Yeti Movie"	3:05
21.	"Anima"	1:32
22.	"Derum Dig"	1:15
23.	"Tarot Ash"	2:26
24.	"Cluster Ghosts"	1:20
25.	"Känguru Join"	1:12
