= Piñata (Freddie Gibbs and Madlib album) =

Studio album by Freddie Gibbs & Madlib
- Released: March 18, 2014
- Recorded: 2011–2013
- Genre: Hip-hop
- Length: 60:13
- Label: Madlib Invazion
- Producer: Madlib

Freddie Gibbs & Madlib chronology
Deeper (2013)	Piñata (2014)	Knicks (2014)

Freddie Gibbs chronology
Deeper (2013)	Piñata (2014)	The Tonite Show (2015)

Madlib chronology
Rock Konducta Pt. 1 (2013)	Piñata (2014)	Piñata Beats (2014)

Alternative cover
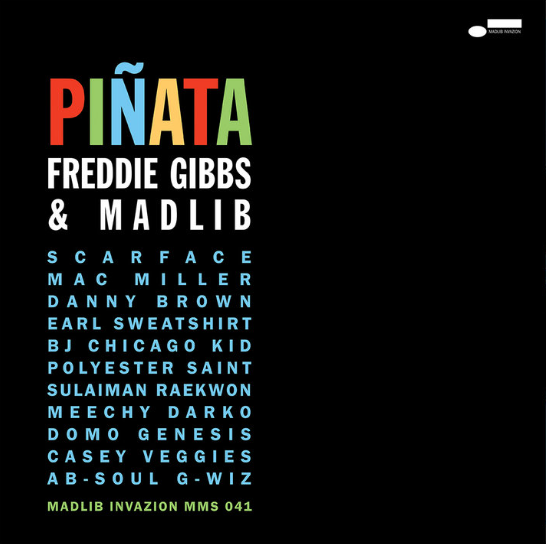
- The '64 LP Edition cover

Alternative cover
- The '74 LP Edition cover

Alternative cover
- The '84 LP Edition cover

Singles from Piñata
- 1. "Thuggin'" Released: November 21, 2011; 2. "Shame" Released: June 22, 2012; 3. "Deeper" Released: September 3, 2013

Piñata is the first collaborative studio album by American rapper Freddie Gibbs and record producer Madlib, also known as MadGibbs. It was released on March 18, 2014, by Madlib Invazion. Entirely produced by Madlib, the 17-track LP features contributions from Raekwon, Earl Sweatshirt, Danny Brown, Domo Genesis, Scarface, BJ the Chicago Kid, Ab-Soul, Casey Veggies, Meechy Darko and Mac Miller, among others. The album was recorded by Josh "The Goon" Fadem and Glenn "G-Wiz" Browder between January 2011 and October 2013. It was mixed and mastered by Dave Cooley for Elysian Masters, except for "Shame" and "Terrorist", mixed by Kelly Hibbert.

Piñata was preceded by three EPs including Thuggin' (2011), Shame (2012) and Deeper (2013). The album received widespread acclaim from critics and debuted at number 39 on the US Billboard 200, with first-week sales of 9,000 copies in the United States.

== Background ==
I'ma tell you the truth, man. I had a dream, dog, that I had a little baby. The little baby's birthday was here and shit. You know I like Latina girls and shit, man. I want to say all of my girls speak Spanish and shit. Anyways, so the baby would probably be a Mexi-nigga or some shit. So it was like a little nigga-Mexican baby and shit. That nigga wanted a piñata, man, in the dream, man. I don't know. I must've been cooking some dope or some shit that week, because the nigga started hitting the piñata, and it wasn't shit but dope falling out the piñata. I was just like, "Damn, man." They was just kids playing in the dope. They was just playin' in the dope. It was little four-year-old kids hitting dope in piñatas. I don't know. It was a crazy ass dream. So, I just called that shit Cocaine Piñata.

— Freddie Gibbs, speaking in April 2013, with HipHopDX about how he came up with the album's original title, Cocaine Piñata.

In a press release, Freddie Gibbs described Piñata as "a gangster Blaxploitation film on wax. I will show you my flaws, I'll show you what I've done wrong and what I've fucked up at... I don't regret shit, but I'll show you the things I'm not proud of. I'm about to show niggas how to rap again. As long as I keep satisfying them, everybody else is going to fall in line". Additionally, Madlib, added "My stuff, it ain't fully quantized… it has more of a human feel, so it might slow down or speed up. So you have to be the type of rapper, like [MF Doom] or Freddie, who can catch that, or else you'll be sounding crazy".

In February 2014, the track list and the cover art of the album was released. The cover art features Gibbs wearing a black Adidas tracksuit and hanging out in a neighborhood park, with a zebra print border surrounding the image. In a March 2014, interview with Rolling Stone, Madlib spoke about how they started working on the album, saying: "I met him through Ben Lambo. He used to work at Stones Throw. I heard some of an earlier album with Jeezy on it [Gibbs' Cold Day in Hell]. And Lambo wanted to see if he could do something different over my style of beats. That's where it all started… I had gotten over eight CDs worth of music to him, and just let him pick out whatever he could vibe to. I didn't do anything special, I just let him pick stuff that he could write to. I thought he'd pick different types of beats, [but it was] all raw shit. I didn't have to tell him, but that's what he wanted to record."

He also spoke about how they recorded the album separately, saying: "No, he recorded the vocals on his own. Like, I handed him all the CDs, and he picked out all the beats he wanted, he recorded them at his studio, then he handed those off to me, then we finished it. I would add little things, like these choruses. That's what usually happens: I let 'em record what they want, then I add stuff as needed after that, like extra horns or whatever… I'm usually working on other thangs, you know what I mean? I don't have time to sit there and coach somebody that just already knows what to do, and that's the kind of people I usually work with… I don't want to sit there like a babysitter."

Gibbs also spoke about how the album was recorded over three years, saying: "We two different guys, man. I was still in the streets when I first started that Madlib album. I was, then I wasn't. You can tell the progression on the record, though. You can tell the different places that I'm in, 'cause I did it over the course of three years, coming up with the ideas and concepts."

== Singles ==
The album's lead single, "Thuggin'", was released on November 21, 2011. The album's second single, "Shame", was released on June 22, 2012. The song features a guest appearance from American singer BJ the Chicago Kid. The album's third single, "Deeper", was released on September 3, 2013.

== Critical reception ==
Professional ratings
Aggregate scores
Source	Rating
AnyDecentMusic?	7.7/10
Metacritic	82/100
Review scores
Source	Rating
AllMusic	4/5 stars
The A.V. Club	B+
Consequence	B+
The Guardian	3/5 stars
HipHopDX	4.5/5
NME	8/10
Pitchfork	8.0/10
Rolling Stone	3.5/5 stars
Slant Magazine	4/5 stars
Spin	7/10

"Thuggin'"
With "Thuggin''" as an example from the album, it characterizes Madlib's technical ability and Gibbs' lyrics and flow based on his gangsta side and street life that received widespread critical acclaim.

Piñata was met with widespread critical acclaim. At Metacritic, which assigns a normalized rating out of 100 to reviews from mainstream publications, the album received an average score of 82, based on 19 reviews. Aggregator AnyDecentMusic? gave it 7.7 out of 10, based on their assessment of the critical consensus.

Brian Josephs of Consequence said, "Piñata comes with just enough to reduce the daunting 17-track length to a non-factor, although it drags a bit with overt nostalgia toward the fourth quarter. But sometimes nostalgia is good, especially when it's interpreted with the right amount of imagination". Nate Patrin of Pitchfork said, "It doesn't matter if Gibbs and Madlib were once considered artists playing to different audiences -- united in their uncompromising, independent-as-fuck visions, they put together something hardcore hip-hop heads on both sides should feel". Simon Vozick-Levinson of Rolling Stone said, "At its best, Piñata recalls the dark-alley vibes of Raekwon's classic, RZA-produced 1995 debut, Only Built 4 Cuban Linx... It's no coincidence that one of the strongest tracks features an excellently grim guest verse from Rae himself".

Joe Sweeney of Slant Magazine said, "Piñata does suffer from a bloated middle, with a few too many beats derived from '70s slow jams (imagine Shaft with less Richard Roundtree gunplay and more Richard Roundtree 'gunplay'). But by the time the title track hits its groove to close things out, it's clear that all the foreplay was worth it". Paul MacInnes of The Guardian said, "It doesn't always seem a perfect fit – Gibbs' rough edges scrap up against Madlib's strings, and sometimes Piñata sounds like a low-key affair. It also feels a little dated, because Madlib has been practicing this kind of project for a decade – alongside similarly independent-minded artists like J Dilla and Doom. A-list guest appearances from Raekwon, Scarface and Earl Sweatshirt enliven the recipe, however". David Jeffries of AllMusic said, "Startling numbers like the block-rockin' then dissolving "Real" crop up throughout the album and make this project even more than a sum of its parts, and with the track list flowing smoothly as attractive guests (Danny Brown, Raekwon, Scarface, Mac Miller, and the list goes diversely and gloriously on) come and go, Piñata winds up excellent overall. Extra points are added for being a peerless success while still giving fans of Mobb Deep, Slum Village, Young Buck, Odd Future, and David Banner enough familiar touchstones for easy access".

Jay Balfour of HipHopDX said, "As Gangster Rap, Piñata is free of conceptual pretense; it's a slice more than a thesis. It's also a new benchmark for Gibbs and may end up as a career calling card. If nothing else, it quickly sounds like one of the year's best". Ben Cardew of NME said, "At its best – as on the heart-rending 'Deeper' – Piñata sounds like a close cousin to Raekwon's classic Only Built 4 Cuban Linx (indeed Raekwon guests on Piñata track 'Bomb'). And that is a compliment indeed. The only complaint, surely, is that the duo dropped the original title: Cocaine Piñata". Kevin Jones of Exclaim! said, "While the beats and rhymes – helped along to varying degrees by guests Domo, Earl Sweatshirt, Ab-Soul and Danny Brown, among others – are as tight and efficient as you might expect, the record's many time-honoured hood tropes and (admittedly restrained) Blaxploitation elements simply fail to inspire through certain segments".

=== Year-end lists ===
Select year-end rankings of Piñata
Publication	List	Rank	Ref.
Billboard	Ten Best Rap Albums of 2014	10	
Complex	50 Best Albums of 2014	33	
Consequence	Top 50 Albums of 2014	10	
Pitchfork	The Best Albums of 2014	43	
Rolling Stone	40 Best Rap Albums of 2014	6	
Spin	40 Best Hip-Hop Albums of 2014	3	
Stereogum	40 Best Rap Albums of 2014	5	
Vibe	46 Best Albums of 2014	22	
The Wire	Releases of the Year 1–50	27	

== Commercial performance ==
Piñata debuted at number 39 on the US Billboard 200, with first-week sales of 9,000 copies in the United States.

== Track listing ==
All tracks produced by Madlib.

Piñata track listing
No.	Title	Writer(s)	Length
1.	"Supplier"	Otis Jackson	0:48
2.	"Scarface"	Fredrick Tipton; Jackson	2:06
3.	"Deeper"	Tipton; Jackson; Curtis McCormick	3:19
4.	"High" (featuring Danny Brown)	Tipton; Jackson; Daniel Sewell	2:57
5.	"Harold's"	Tipton; Jackson	2:49
6.	"Bomb" (featuring Raekwon)	Tipton; Jackson; Corey Woods	3:43
7.	"Shitsville"	Tipton; Jackson	3:31
8.	"Thuggin'"	Tipton; Jackson; Joachim Sherylee	3:46
9.	"Real"	Tipton; Jackson	3:34
10.	"Uno"	Tipton; Jackson	2:47
11.	"Robes" (featuring Domo Genesis and Earl Sweatshirt)	Tipton; Jackson; Dominique Cole; Thebe Kgositsile	5:04
12.	"Broken" (featuring Scarface)	Tipton; Jackson; Brad Jordan	4:08
13.	"Lakers" (featuring Ab-Soul and Polyester the Saint)	Tipton; Jackson; Herbert Stevens; Christopher Cleveland	4:30
14.	"Knicks"	Tipton; Jackson	3:39
15.	"Shame" (featuring BJ the Chicago Kid)	Tipton; Jackson; Bryan Sledge	3:03
16.	"Watts" (featuring Big Time Watts)	Jackson; G. Watts	1:55
17.	"Piñata" (featuring Domo Genesis, G-Wiz, Casey Veggies, Sulaiman, Meechy Darko and Mac Miller)	Tipton; Jackson; Cole; Glenn Browder; Casey Jones; S. Shabazz; Dimitri Simms; Malcolm McCormick	8:33
Total length:			60:13

Best Buy deluxe edition (bonus tracks)
No.	Title	Writer(s)	Length
18.	"Deep"	Tipton; Jackson	2:03
19.	"Cold in the Blvd."	Jackson	1:19
20.	"Terrorist"	Tipton; Jackson	1:12
21.	"The Morning After"	Tipton; Jackson	2:52

Deluxe edition (bonus tracks)
No.	Title	Writer(s)	Length
18.	"City"	Tipton; Jackson	2:06
19.	"City" (instrumental)	Tipton; Jackson	2:07
20.	"Deep"	Tipton; Jackson	2:08
21.	"Deep" (instrumental)	Tipton; Jackson	2:03
22.	"Cold in the Blvd."	Jackson	1:19
23.	"Riot Call"	Tipton; Jackson	2:07
24.	"Terrorist"	Tipton; Jackson	1:12
25.	"Terrorist" (instrumental)	Tipton; Jackson	1:12
26.	"The Morning After"	Tipton; Jackson	2:52
27.	"Later That Night"	Tipton; Jackson	1:34
28.	"The Long Walk Home"	Tipton; Jackson	1:19
29.	"Ups and Downs"	Tipton; Jackson	2:31
30.	"The Garden"	Tipton; Jackson	1:32
31.	"Home"	Tipton; Jackson	2:13
32.	"Home" (instrumental)	Tipton; Jackson	2:12
33.	"The Dunk"	Tipton; Jackson	1:44
34.	"Knicks" (remix)	Tipton; Jackson	4:48
35.	"Knicks" (remix instrumental)	Tipton; Jackson	4:47
36.	"Cocaine Parties"	Tipton; Jackson	3:21
37.	"Cocaine Parties" (instrumental)	Tipton; Jackson	3:21
38.	"Scarface" (instrumental)	Tipton; Jackson	1:44
39.	"Deeper" (instrumental)	Tipton; Jackson; McCormick	3:07
40.	"High" (instrumental)	Tipton; Jackson; Sewell	2:45
41.	"Harold's" (instrumental)	Tipton; Jackson	2:49
42.	"Bomb" (instrumental)	Tipton; Jackson; Woods	3:19
43.	"Shitsville" (instrumental)	Tipton; Jackson	2:51
44.	"Thuggin'" (instrumental)	Tipton; Jackson; Sherylee	3:23
45.	"Real" (instrumental)	Tipton; Jackson	3:15
46.	"Uno" (instrumental)	Tipton; Jackson	2:48
47.	"Robes" (instrumental)	Tipton; Jackson; Cole; Kgositsile	3:26
48.	"Broken" (instrumental)	Tipton; Jackson; Jordan	4:09
49.	"Lakers" (instrumental)	Tipton; Jackson; Stevens; Cleveland	4:25
50.	"Knicks" (instrumental)	Tipton; Jackson	3:39
51.	"Shame" (instrumental)	Tipton; Jackson; Sledge	3:05
52.	"Watts" (instrumental)	Jackson; G. Watts	1:20
53.	"Piñata" (instrumental)	Tipton; Jackson; Cole; Browder; Jones; Shabazz; Simms; McCormick	5:45
54.	"Scarface" (Alex Goose remix)	Tipton; Jackson; Alex Goose	1:40
55.	"Deep" (Alex Goose remix)	Tipton; Jackson; McCormick; Goose	2:10
56.	"Harold's" (Alex Goose remix)	Tipton; Jackson; Goose	2:32
57.	"Bomb" (Alex Goose remix)	Tipton; Jackson; Woods; Goose	3:09
58.	"Thuggin'" (Alex Goose remix)	Tipton; Jackson; Sherylee; Goose	3:12
59.	"Real" (Alex Goose remix)	Tipton; Jackson; Goose	3:08
60.	"Terrorist" (Alex Goose remix)	Tipton; Jackson; Goose	1:13
61.	"Uno" (Alex Goose remix)	Tipton; Jackson; Goose	2:47
62.	"Robes" (Alex Goose remix)	Tipton; Jackson; Cole; Kgositsile; Goose	3:10
63.	"Shitsville" (Alex Goose remix)	Tipton; Jackson; Goose	2:54
64.	"Lakers" (Alex Goose remix)	Tipton; Jackson; Stevens; Cleveland; Goose	4:04
65.	"Knicks" (Alex Goose remix)	Tipton; Jackson; Goose	2:18
66.	"Shame" (Alex Goose remix)	Tipton; Jackson; Sledge; Goose	2:59
67.	"Broken" (Alex Goose remix)	Tipton; Jackson; Jordan; Goose	4:07
68.	"Supplier" (Alex Goose remix)	Jackson; Goose	0:37
69.	"Scarface" (Alex Goose instrumental remix)	Tipton; Jackson; Goose	1:38
70.	"Deep" (Alex Goose instrumental remix)	Tipton; Jackson; McCormick; Goose	2:09
71.	"Harold's" (Alex Goose instrumental remix)	Tipton; Jackson; Goose	2:30
72.	"Bomb" (Alex Goose instrumental remix)	Tipton; Jackson; Woods; Goose	3:09
73.	"Thuggin'" (Alex Goose instrumental remix)	Tipton; Jackson; Sherylee; Goose	3:11
74.	"Real" (Alex Goose instrumental remix)	Tipton; Jackson; Goose	3:06
75.	"Terrorist" (Alex Goose instrumental remix)	Tipton; Jackson; Goose	1:13
76.	"Uno" (Alex Goose instrumental remix)	Tipton; Jackson; Goose	2:47
77.	"Robes" (Alex Goose instrumental remix)	Tipton; Jackson; Cole; Kgositsile; Goose	3:09
78.	"Shitsville" (Alex Goose instrumental remix)	Tipton; Jackson; Goose	2:52
79.	"Lakers" (Alex Goose instrumental remix)	Tipton; Jackson; Stevens; Cleveland; Goose	4:03
80.	"Knicks" (Alex Goose instrumental remix)	Tipton; Jackson; Goose	2:17
81.	"Shame" (Alex Goose instrumental remix)	Tipton; Jackson; Sledge; Goose	2:56
82.	"Broken" (Alex Goose instrumental remix)	Tipton; Jackson; Jordan; Goose	4:06
83.	"Supplier" (Alex Goose instrumental remix)	Jackson; Goose	0:36
Total length:			177:00

Sample credits

- "Deeper" contains a sample of "A Fool for You", written by Curtis McCormick, as performed by the Ledgends.
- "Thuggin'" contains a sample of "Way Star", written by Joachim Sherylee, as performed by Rubba.

== Personnel ==
Credits for Piñata adapted from AllMusic.

- Ab-Soul – featured artist
- Eothen Alapatt – executive producer
- Peter Beste – cover photo
- BJ the Chicago Kid – featured artist
- Archibald Bonkers – executive producer
- Glenn "G-Wiz" Browder – engineer
- Danny Brown – featured artist
- Casey Veggies – featured artist
- Dave Cooley – mastering, mixing
- Meechy Darko – featured artist
- Josh Fadem – engineer
- Domo Genesis – featured artist
- Freddie Gibbs – primary artist, quotation author, rap
- G-Wiz – featured artist
- Kelly Hibbert – mastering, mixing
- Otis "Madlib" Jackson – beats, primary artist, producer
- Brad "Scarface" Jordan – featured artist
- Ben "Lambo" Lambert – executive producer
- Malcolm "Mac Miller" McCormick – featured artist
- Henoch Moore – production coordination
- Polyester the Saint – featured artist
- Raekwon – featured artist
- Matthew Scott – photography
- Sulaiman – featured artist
- Earl Sweatshirt – featured artist
- Big Time Watts – featured artist

== Charts ==
=== Weekly charts ===
Chart performance for Piñata
Chart (2014)	Peak position
UK R&B Albums (Official Charts)	16
US Billboard 200	39
US Independent Albums (Billboard)	6
US Top R&B/Hip-Hop Albums (Billboard)	11
US Top Rap Albums (Billboard)	7

=== Year-end charts ===
2014 year-end chart performance for Piñata
Chart (2014)	Position
US Top R&B/Hip-Hop Albums (Billboard)	95
