= Str8 Killa =

EP by Freddie Gibbs
- Released: August 3, 2010
- Recorded: 2009–2010
- Genres: Hip hop; gangsta rap
- Length: 35:24
- Labels: Decon; Gibbs Family
- Producers: Block Beattaz; DJ Burn One; B-Flat Trax; L.A. Riot Music (Josh the Goon & Speakerbomb); Kno; Beatnick; K-Salaam; Blended Babies

Freddie Gibbs chronology
Str8 Killa No Filla (2010)	Str8 Killa (2010)	Lord Giveth, Lord Taketh Away (2011)

Singles from Str8 Killa
- 1. "National Anthem (Fuck the World)" Released: June 29, 2010; 2. "Oil Money" Released: July 20, 2010

Professional ratings
Review scores
Source	Rating
About.com	4.5/5 stars
AllMusic	3.5/5 stars
HipHopDX	3.5/5 stars
HipHopSite.Com	4/5 stars
Los Angeles Times	3.5/4 stars
Pitchfork Media	(8.0/10)
Rolling Stone	3.5/5 stars
Spin	7/10
Washington Post	(Favorable)

Str8 Killa is the third EP by rapper Freddie Gibbs. It was released on August 3, 2010 through Decon Records and Gibbs Family. It serves as commercial release of the Str8 Killa No Filla mixtape released one week prior to the EP. All songs but "The Coldest" and "Oil Money" are from the mixtape

== Singles ==
- The first single was "National Anthem (Fuck the World)" and it was released on June 29, 2010. It was produced by L.A. Riot Music. A music video was released for the single on July 27, 2010.
- The second single was "Oil Money", featuring Chuck Inglish, Chip tha Ripper, Bun B & Dan Auerbach, and was released on July 20, 2010. A music video was released for the single on September 8, 2010.

== Track listing ==
Track listing confirmed by Rap-Up.

No.	Title	Producer(s)	Length
1.	"Str8 Killa No Filla" (featuring Big Kill)	Block Beattaz	4:21
2.	"Rep 2 tha Fullest" (featuring Jay Rock)	DJ Burn One; B-Flat Trax	3:36
3.	"National Anthem (Fuck the World)"	L.A. Riot Music (Josh the Goon & Speakerbomb)	3:50
4.	"The Coldest" (featuring BJ the Chicago Kid)	Kno	4:54
5.	"Personal OG"	Block Beattaz	4:34
6.	"Live By the Game"	Block Beattaz	3:58
7.	"Rock Bottom" (featuring Bun B)	Beatnick; K-Salaam	5:15
8.	"Oil Money" (featuring Chuck Inglish, King Chip, Bun B and Dan Auerbach)	Blended Babies	4:52

== Charts ==
Chart (2010)	Peak position
U.S. Billboard Top R&B/Hip-Hop Albums	48
U.S. Billboard Top Heatseekers	13

== Credits ==
Credits confirmed by AllMusic.

- Beatnick – Producing, Mixing
- Archibald Bonkers – Executive Producer
- Cook Classics – Engineer
- Deacon the Villain – Synthesizer
- DJ Burn One – Producer, Mixing
- B. Freeman – Composer
- Freddie Gibbs – Executive Producer
- K-Salaam – Producer, Mixing
- Kno – Synthesizer, Producer, Drum Programming, Mixing
- Lambo – Executive Producer
- Sidney Miller – Composer
- Alex Ortiz – Vocal Mixing
- N. Phillips – Composer
- Alexander Richter – Photography
