= Freddie Gibbs & Madlib =

American hip-hop duo

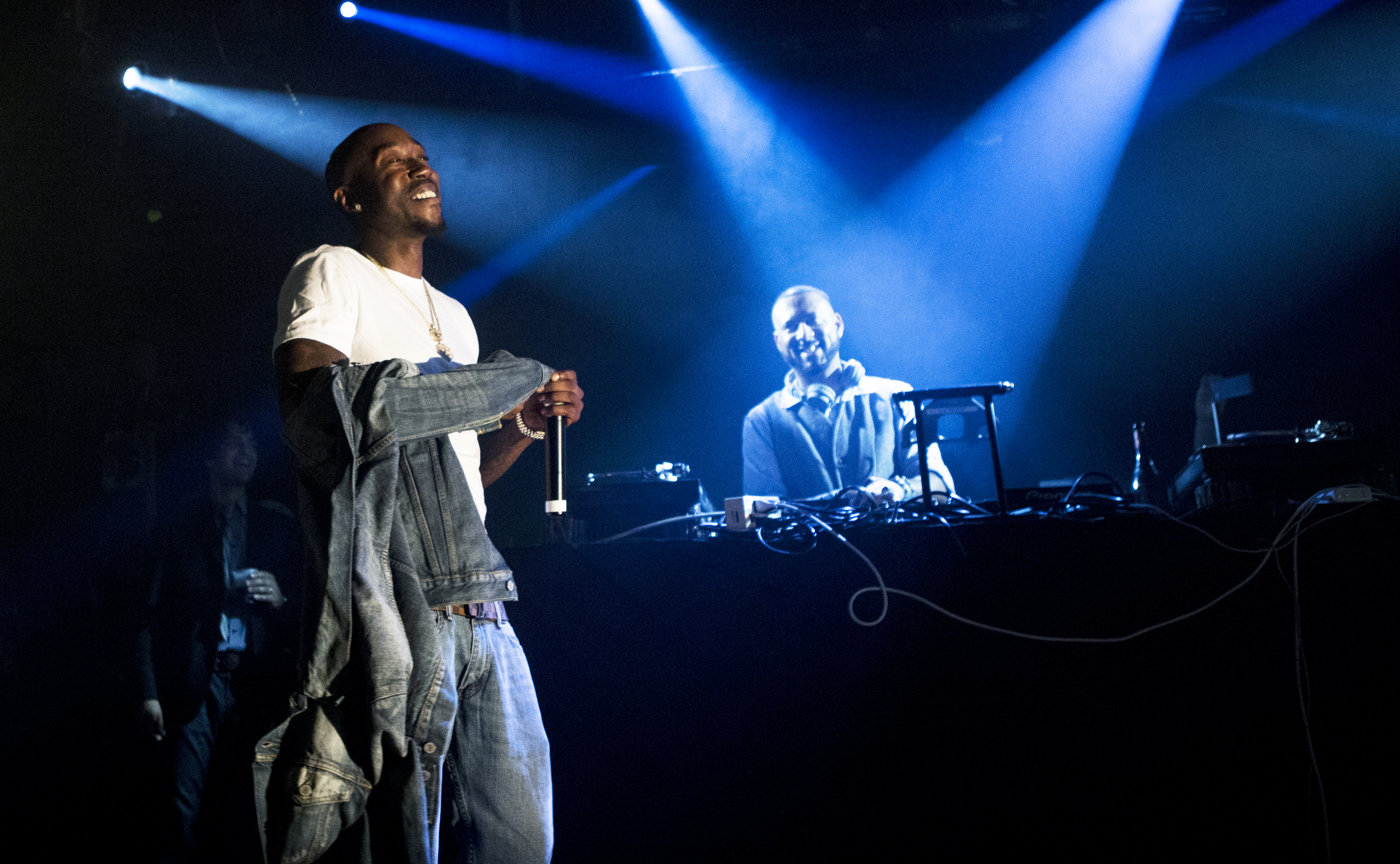
- Freddie Gibbs (left) and Madlib performing live in March 2014

Background information
- Also known as: MadGibbs
- Origin: San Francisco, California, U.S.
- Genre: Hip-hop
- Years active: 2011–present
- Labels: Madlib Invazion; Keep Cool; RCA; ESGN
- Members: Freddie Gibbs; Madlib

Freddie Gibbs & Madlib, sometimes known as MadGibbs, is an American hip-hop duo formed in San Francisco, California, in 2011. The duo is composed of Gary, Indiana native Freddie Gibbs rapping and Oxnard, California native Madlib producing. The duo has released two studio albums, Piñata in 2014 and Bandana in 2019. They have also released five extended plays (EPs) together.

== History ==
=== 2011–13: Formation and debut EPs ===
On November 18, 2011, at the Madlib Medicine Show live event at Mighty in San Francisco, Madlib brought out Freddie Gibbs and announced their first collaborative EP titled Thuggin'. The project had been concealed for at least six months until it was made available for sale at the event.

Gibbs performed the title track and "Deep" during his collaborative set with Madlib. Following the surprise performance, five hundred copies of the limited-edition EP were sold at the venue. The EP was exclusively on sale at Madlib's shows, but was made available for retail purchase on November 21, 2011, by Madlib's Madlib Invazion imprint. The EP contains two main vocal tracks, instrumentals and two bonus beats. On January 16, 2012, a music video for the lead single "Thuggin'", directed by Jonah Schwartz, was premiered online.

Speaking with Jay Z's Life + Times, Gibbs decoded a few lines from "Thuggin'", explaining how he extracted from personal experiences in Gary, Indiana, for the track: "The song is "Thuggin'". First line, I say, 'We're not against rap, but we're against those thugs.' Speaking about how society wasn't against rap music but against the thug element of it. I felt like that's what I represent," he said. "What I'm rapping is what I'm living. I'm using rap as a vehicle to get me away from that type of living. You may get to that level, selling drugs and engaging in certain activities in the street," he continued. "You might end up selling drugs to one of your family members, hell, you might end up shooting one of your family members. The drug and the crime shit really deteriorated our community - my community, at least. And then I say something about my uncle was addicted to drugs in the verse. That's real shit. That's a true example of a king to a fiend, someone who was a prominent and hard-working guy in the community that went from not having work and being addicted to crack cocaine."

Their second EP Shame was released on July 10, 2012, by Madlib Invazion in both digital and 12-inch vinyl formats. The eight-track EP includes two vocal tracks, "Shame" featuring singer BJ the Chicago Kid and "Terrorist", as well as instrumentals, a cappellas and two bonus beats by Madlib.

Their third EP Deeper, released on September 24, 2013, was the final EP in the trilogy before the release of their full-length LP, Piñata.

=== 2014: Debut album ===
In a press release, Gibbs described Piñata as "a gangster Blaxploitation film on wax". "I will show you my flaws, I'll show you what I've done wrong and what I've fucked up at. I don't regret shit, but I'll show you the things I'm not proud of. I'm about to show niggas how to rap again. Everybody else is going to fall in line." Madlib added. "My stuff, it ain't fully quantized… it has more of a human feel, so it might slow down or speed up. So you have to be the type of rapper, like [MF Doom] or Freddie, who can catch that, or else you'll be sounding crazy."

In February 2014, the track list and the cover art of the album were released. The cover art shows Gibbs wearing a black Adidas tracksuit and hanging out in a neighborhood park, with a zebra print border surrounding the image. In a March 2014, interview with Rolling Stone, Madlib spoke about how they started working on the album, saying, "I met him through Ben Lambo. He used to work at Stones Throw. I heard some of an earlier album with Jeezy on it [Gibbs' Cold Day In Hell]. And Lambo wanted to see if he could do something different over my style of beats. That's where it all started… I had gotten over eight CDs worth of music to him, and just let him pick out whatever he could vibe to. I didn't do anything special, I just let him pick stuff that he could write to. I thought he'd pick different types of beats, [but it was] all raw shit. I didn't have to tell him, but that's what he wanted to record." He also spoke about how they recorded the album separately, saying, "No, he recorded the vocals on his own. Like, I handed him all the CDs, and he picked out all the beats he wanted, he recorded them at his studio, then he handed those off to me, then we finished it. I would add little things, like these choruses. That's what usually happens: I let 'em record what they want, then I add stuff as needed after that, like extra horns or whatever… I'm usually working on other thangs, you know what I mean? I don't have time to sit there and coach somebody that just already knows what to do, and that's the kind of people I usually work with… I don't want to sit there like a babysitter." Gibbs also spoke about how the album was recorded over three years, saying, "We two different guys, man. I was still in the streets when I first started that Madlib album. I was, then I wasn't. You can tell the progression on the record, though. You can tell the different places that I'm in, 'cause I did it over the course of three years, coming up with the ideas and concepts."

Preceded by their 2014 album, Knicks (Remix) was released on October 20, 2014, by Madlib Invazion in both digital and 12-inch vinyl formats. The six-track EP includes two vocal tracks, "Knicks (Remix)" featuring Action Bronson, Joey Bada$$ and Ransom, and "Home" featuring singer BJ the Chicago Kid, as well as instrumentals and two bonus beats by Madlib.

=== 2016–present: Hiatus and sophomore album ===
During Madlib's talk with Red Bull Music Academy on May 7, 2016, he announced that he and Freddie Gibbs will be releasing a second collaborative studio album called Bandana. Madlib also mentioned that many of the rejected beats he auditioned for Kanye West's The Life of Pablo would appear on the new project. Freddie Gibbs confirmed this on Twitter while his manager tweeted a teaser picture of Madlib beats.

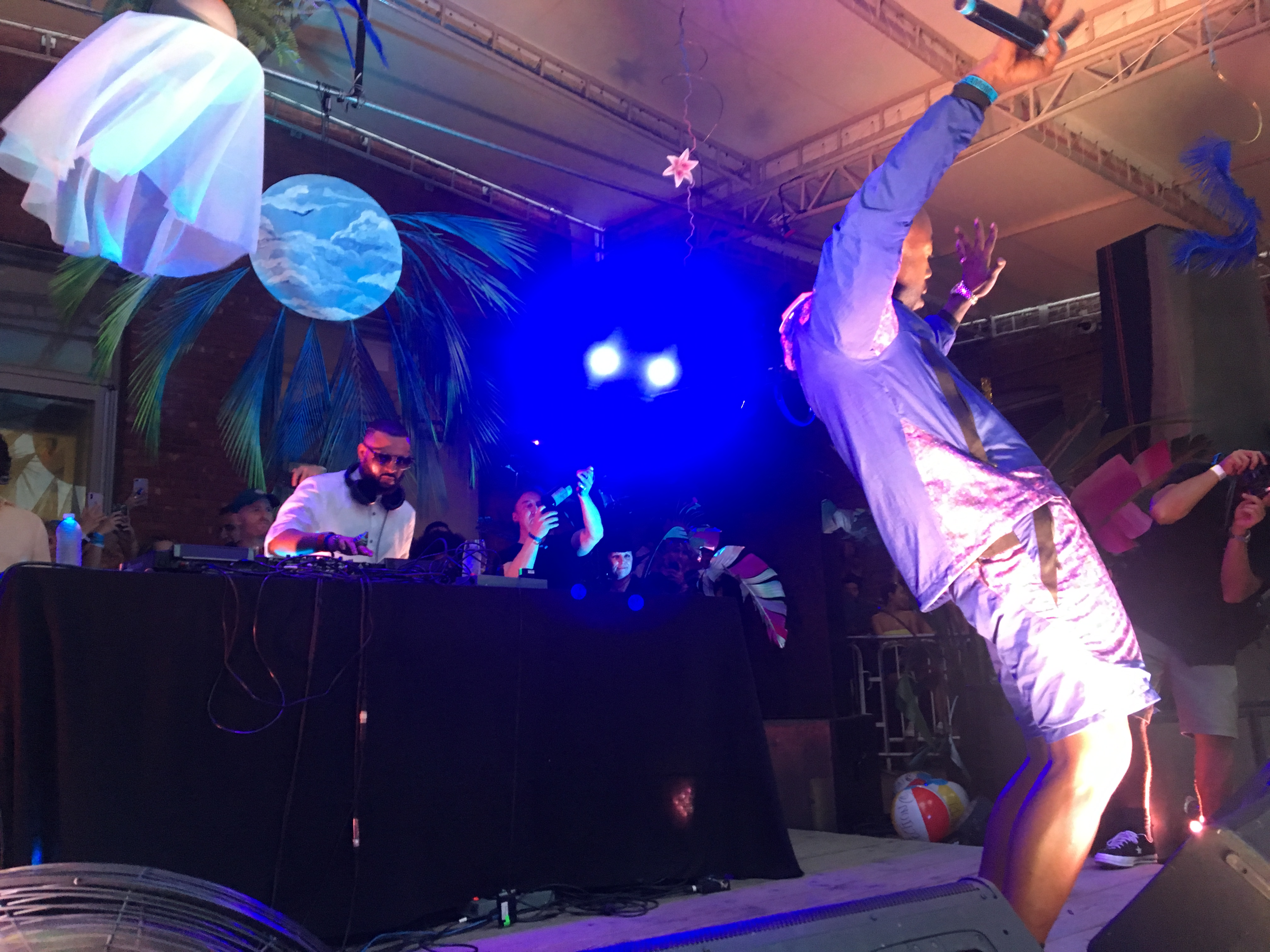
MadGibbs performing shortly after the release of Bandana in NYC.

On February 7, 2019, Madlib posted an Instagram picture of his cartoon alter-ego Quasimoto with the cryptic caption "we are clearing samples ...", alluding to Bandana having finished being recorded. On February 12, Gibbs shared a clip of himself with Madlib further teasing the project and stating that they "Might put some shit out. Might. Thinking about it. We thinking about it." The next day, on February 13, Gibbs continued to tease upcoming music and wrote on his Instagram story that the "Album is done. Finished. Finito." On February 20, Gibbs and Madlib released the single "Flat Tummy Tea" and announced that Bandana was set to be released in 2019 by Keep Cool Records, RCA Records, Madlib Invazion and ESGN. A second single, the title track "Bandana", featuring the dancehall artist Assassin, was released on March 5, 2019. On May 11, 2019, Gibbs and Madlib announced that Bandana would be the second installment of a planned trilogy, following Piñata, and that the third would be called Montana. On May 28, 2019, the official album cover was revealed, showing Madlib's animated alter-ego Quasimoto wearing a bandana around his neck and sitting on a zebra as they watch buildings in Hollywood being set on fire. On May 30, the single "Crime Pays" was released and Bandana was later released June 28 to commercial and critical success.

In December 2019, Gibbs and Madlib recorded a concert for NPR's Tiny Desk Concerts series, performing four tracks from Bandana. Abby O'Neill of NPR called it "the best Tiny Desk of the year."

== Discography ==
=== Studio albums ===
List of studio albums, with selected details
Title	Album details	Peak chart positions
Title	Album details	US
Piñata	Released: March 18, 2014; Label: Madlib Invazion; Format: Digital download, CD, vinyl, cassette, streaming	39
Bandana	Released: June 28, 2019; Label: Keep Cool Records, RCA Records, Madlib Invazion, ESGN; Format: Digital download, streaming, CD, vinyl	21

=== Extended plays (EPs) ===
List of extended plays, with selected details
Title	Album details
Thuggin' (as MadGibbs)	Released: November 21, 2011; Label: Madlib Invazion; Format: Digital download, vinyl, streaming
Shame (as MadGibbs)	Released: July 10, 2012; Label: Madlib Invazion; Format: Digital download, vinyl, streaming
Deeper (as MadGibbs)	Released: September 24, 2013; Label: Madlib Invazion; Format: Digital download, vinyl, streaming
Knicks (Remix) (as MadGibbs)	Released: October 20, 2014; Label: Madlib Invazion; Format: Digital download, vinyl, streaming
The Diamond Mine Sessions (with El Michels Affair)	Released: May 7, 2020; Label: Madlib Invazion, ESGN, Keep Cool, RCA; Format: Digital download, streaming

=== Singles ===
List of singles, with year released and album name
Title	Year	Album(s)
"Thuggin'" (as MadGibbs)	2011	Thuggin' and Piñata
"Shame" (as MadGibbs)	2012	Shame and Piñata
"Deeper" (as MadGibbs)	2013	Deeper and Piñata
"City" (featuring Karriem Riggins)	2013	Adult Swim Singles Program 2013
"Cocaine Parties in L.A."	2016	non-album single
"Bandana" (featuring Assassin)	2019	non-album single
"Flat Tummy Tea"	2019	Bandana
"Crime Pays"	2019	Bandana
"Giannis" (featuring Anderson .Paak)	2019	Bandana
