= Shame (EP) =

EP by MadGibbs
- Released: July 10, 2012
- Recorded: 2012
- Genre: Hip-hop; jazz
- Length: 16:27
- Label: Madlib Invazion
- Producer: Madlib

MadGibbs chronology
Thuggin' (2011)	Shame (2012)	Deeper (2013)

Freddie Gibbs chronology
Thuggin' (2011)	Shame (2012)	Baby Face Killa (2012)

Madlib chronology
Thuggin' (2011)	Shame (2012)	Rock Konducta 45 (2013)

Singles from Shame
- 1. "Shame" Released: June 26, 2012

Shame is the second EP by hip-hop duo MadGibbs, which consists of Indiana rapper Freddie Gibbs and California hip-hop musician Madlib. Preceded by their 2011 EP, Thuggin', it was released on July 10, 2012, through Madlib Invazion in both digital and 12-inch vinyl formats. The 8-track EP includes two vocal tracks, "Shame" featuring singer BJ the Chicago Kid and "Terrorist", as well as instrumentals, a cappellas and two bonus beats by Madlib.

On August 8, 2012, the EP's music video, presented by Madlib Invasion and DD172 Films, was published online. The Jonah Schwartz-directed visual starts off with a portion of "Later That Night", then transitions to "Terrorist", then changes to the second bonus beat, "The Morning After", which finally leads to the title track. The clip is the sequel to "Thuggin'".

== Critical response ==
Professional ratings
Review scores
Source	Rating
Consequence of Sound	C−
KevinNottingham	7/10 stars

In his review for Spin magazine on July 11, 2012, Brandon Soderberg named the EP the "Rap Release of the Week". He wrote: "The brevity of Shame makes it addictive, though. The instrumentals here are plenty of fun to hear, and so are the bonus beats, and even Gibbs' a cappellas, because his rapping is so up-and-down melodic, are engaging when they stand alone. They're not, well, uncomfortable to listen to like a lot hip-hop vocal tracks. 'Terrorist' easily could pass for spoken-word." Morgan, writing for KevinNottingham.com, found the whole project "to be a very solid listen the first time around and since getting the EP," he's "been playing the hell" out of the title track. Although the reviewer was not certain why the two songs were not released as individual singles, he wrote that he was "not here to judge the Stones Throw marketing tactics but just as with Thuggin," he was "left wanting more". In conclusion, he praised the duo's "uncanny and powerful chemistry that is Freddie Gibbs' relentless lyricism and hard-nosed delivery combined with the smooth and sonically diverse sounds that make up Madlib's ingenious instrumentals." Jon Hadusek of Consequence of Sound graded the EP as C−, writing: "To call Shame an EP is misleading. It's only two tracks – 'Shame' and 'Terrorist' – with instrumental and acapella versions, as well as some tacked on 'bonus beats'. These songs are strong, however, and make the prospect of a proper debut album from Gibbs that much more exciting. If he wants a legacy, he needs to release a full-length."

== Track listing ==
- All tracks were produced by Madlib.

No.	Title	Writer(s)	Length
1.	"Shame" (featuring BJ the Chicago Kid)	F. Tipton; O. Jackson; B. Sledge	3:05
2.	"Shame (Instrumental)"	O. Jackson	3:05
3.	"Later That Night (Bonus Beat)"	O. Jackson	1:34
4.	"Shame (Acapella)"	F. Tipton; B. Sledge	4:07
5.	"Terrorist"	O. Jackson	1:13
6.	"Terrorist (Instrumental)"	F. Tipton; O. Jackson	1:12
7.	"The Morning After (Bonus Beat)"	O. Jackson	0:58
8.	"Terrorist (Acapella)"	F. Tipton	1:13
Total length:			16:27
