= Gravy (BJ the Chicago Kid album) =

Studio album by BJ the Chicago Kid
- Released: November 10, 2023
- Recorded: 2023
- Genres: R&B, soul
- Length: 62:04
- Labels: RCA, Sony Music
- Producers: Yeti Beats, Charlie Bereal

BJ the Chicago Kid chronology
| 1123 (2019) | Gravy (2023) |

Gravy is the fourth studio album by American singer BJ the Chicago Kid, released on November 10, 2023, by RCA Records.

== Background ==
Following his 2019 album 1123, BJ the Chicago Kid embarked on a collaborative project with producer Yeti Beats, known for his work with artists like Doja Cat. The duo aimed to create a body of work that encapsulated the essence of soul music while infusing contemporary elements. The result was Gravy, an album that BJ describes as embodying "the swag, the umph, the confidence... the fearlessness, the audacity, the boldness" —qualities he associates with the term "gravy."

The album was recorded over a five-day period at the historic Royal Studios in Memphis, Tennessee, a venue renowned for its association with soul legend Al Green. BJ recounted the experience as "magical", noting that recording in a space steeped in musical history added a unique depth to the project.

Gravy features collaborations with a diverse array of artists, including Philip Bailey of Earth, Wind & Fire, Andra Day, the Indications, Robert Glasper, Chlöe, Coco Jones, Cory Henry, and rapper Freddie Gibbs. The album's sound is characterized by a blend of Motown influences, Chicago stepping music, and disco, creating a fusion that pays homage to classic soul while introducing fresh, contemporary elements.

== Promotion ==
To promote the album, BJ the Chicago Kid embarked on "The Gravy Tour" in 2024, performing in various cities across the United States, including New York City, Chicago, and Honolulu.

== Reception ==
Gravy received positive reviews from music critics, who praised its soulful production and BJ the Chicago Kid's vocal performance. Essence highlighted the album's intentional composition, noting that "everything there [on the album] is there for an intentional purpose, to create an intentional world and a universe for you to kind of dwell in and see and feel different things."

Rolling Out included Gravy among its top 10 R&B albums of 2023, describing it as "a soulful journey that tugs at the heartstrings with its heartfelt lyrics and nostalgic melodies." The publication particularly praised the track "Who Cares" for embodying the album’s emotional depth.

Uproxx noted that Gravy marked BJ the Chicago Kid's return to the music scene with his first full-length project since 2019, emphasizing the album's blend of classic soul and contemporary R&B elements.

== Track listing ==
| # | Title | Featured artists | Producer | Length |
|---|---|---|---|---|
| 1 | "Best Night Of Your Life (Intro)" | - | Charlie Bereal & Yeti Beats | 3:42 |
| 2 | "Spend The Night" | Coco Jones | Yeti Beats | 3:13 |
| 3 | "Never Change" | Philip Bailey | Yeti Beats | 4:16 |
| 4 | "Forgot Your Name" | Cory Henry | Charlie Bereal & Yeti Beats | 3:38 |
| 5 | "Liquor Store In The Sky" | Freddie Gibbs | Charlie Bereal & Yeti Beats | 3:20 |
| 6 | "Get Loose" | - | Yeti Beats | 3:37 |
| 7 | "Who Cares" | - | Yeti Beats | 3:47 |
| 8 | "Honey" | Chlöe | Yeti Beats | 3:29 |
| 9 | "Long Time" | - | Charlie Bereal & Yeti Beats | 3:48 |
| 10 | "Smoke Break" | Robert Glasper | Yeti Beats | 2:10 |
| 11 | "Feel Something Do Something" | - | Charlie Bereal & Yeti Beats | 3:10 |
| 12 | "Feel Good" | - | Yeti Beats | 4:16 |
| 13 | "Crazy Love" | Andra Day | Yeti Beats | 3:15 |
| 14 | "Nobody Knows" | - | Charlie Bereal & Yeti Beats | 2:13 |
| 15 | "We'll Be Alright (Outro)" | - | Charlie Bereal & Yeti Beats | 3:23 |
Deluxe Edition Bonus Tracks
| 16 | "Never Change" | Ledisi, Philip Bailey | Yeti Beats | 4:03 |
| 17 | "Crazy Love (Live From The Sun Rose)" | Andra Day | Yeti Beats | 3:20 |
| 18 | "Forgot Your Name (Live From The Sun Rose)" | Cory Henry | Yeti Beats | 3:24 |

Total length: 62:04

== Personnel ==
- BJ the Chicago Kid - Arranger, Composer, Lyricist, Vocals
- Yeti Beats - Producer, Programmer
- Coco Jones - Vocals
- Cory Henry - Composer, Keyboards, Lyricist
- Alissia Benveniste - Co-Producer, Composer, Guitar, Guitar (Bass), Lyricist, Producer
- Andra Day - Composer, Featured Artist, Lyricist
- Boo Mitchell - Engineer, Piano, Producer
- Charlie Bereal - Arranger, Composer, Guitar, Lyricist, Producer
- Chloe Bailey - Composer, Featured Artist, Lyricist
- Freddie Gibbs - Featured Artist
- Ledisi - Vocals
- Philip Bailey - Composer, Featured Artist, Lyricist, Vocals
- Robert Glasper - Featured Artist
- Rogét Chahayed - Co-Producer, Composer, Keyboards, Lyricist, Producer, Strings
