= Thuggin' (EP) =

EP by MadGibbs
- Released: November 21, 2011
- Recorded: 2011
- Genre: Hip-hop; jazz
- Length: 14:19
- Label: Madlib Invazion
- Producer: Madlib

MadGibbs chronology
Thuggin' (2011)	Shame (2012)

Freddie Gibbs chronology
Cold Day In Hell (2010)	Thuggin' (2011)	Shame (2012)

Madlib chronology
O. J. Simpson (2010)	Thuggin' (2011)	Shame (2012)

Singles from Thuggin'
- 1. "Thuggin'" Released: November 21, 2011

Thuggin' is the first EP by hip-hop duo MadGibbs, which consists of Indiana rapper Freddie Gibbs and California hip-hop musician Madlib. It was released on November 21, 2011, through Madlib Invazion. The EP served as a preview for their 2014 full-length debut, Piñata.

== Background ==
On November 18, 2011, at the Madlib Medicine Show live event at Mighty in San Francisco, California, the producer brought out Freddie Gibbs and announced their debut collaborative EP titled Thuggin'. The project has been concealed for at least six months until it was made available for sale at the event.

Gibbs also debuted the title track and "Deep" off his collaborative set with Madlib. Following the surprise performance, five hundred copies of the limited-edition EP were sold out at the venue. According to Gibbs' manager Archie Bonkers, the EP was exclusively on sale at Madlib's shows, but was made available for retail purchase on November 21, 2011, through Madlib's Madlib Invazion imprint. The EP contains two main vocal tracks, instrumentals and two bonus beats. On January 16, 2012, the single's video, directed by Jonah Schwartz, premiered online.

Speaking with Jay-Z's Life + Times, Freddie Gibbs decoded a few lines from "Thuggin'", explaining how he extracted from personal experiences in Gary, Indiana for the track: "The song is 'Thuggin'. First line, I say, 'We're not against rap, but we're against those thugs.' Speaking about how society wasn't against rap music but against the thug element of it. I felt like that's what I represent," he said. "What I'm rapping is what I'm living. I'm using rap as a vehicle to get me away from that type of living."

"You may get to that level, selling drugs and engaging in certain activities in the street," he continued. "You might end up selling drugs to one of your family members, hell, you might end up shooting one of your family members. The drug and the crime shit really deteriorated our community - my community, at least. And then I say something about my uncle was addicted to drugs in the verse. That's real shit. That's a true example of a king to a fiend, someone who was a prominent and hard-working guy in the community that went from not having work and being addicted to crack cocaine."

== Critical response ==
"Thuggin'"
A 24-second excerpt from "Thuggin'", the song received critical acclaim for Madlib's technical ability and Gibbs' lyrics and flow based on his gangsta side and street life.

Thuggin' was met with generally positive reviews from music critics. JC Poppe of DJBooth wrote of the title track, "Gibbs continues to deliver charismatic personality filled verses that include jewels like 'why the Feds worried 'bout me clockin on this corner / when there's politicians out here getting popped in Arizona.' To those that lost their mind over Watch The Throne's 'Otis', 'Thuggin' is truly the simple sample chop based song to get excited over." Nathan S. of Refined Hype wrote, "Of course I'll take a "187" Gibbs gangster banger any day, but hearing the man flow over some more ambient Madlib production on "Thuggin" is a dope reminder of just how good of an emcee the man really is. He can flow over anything without losing any of his gangsterness, and it says just as much about Madlib that he's willing to work with anyone from MF Doom to Gibbs."

Ryan J. of The Smoking Section wrote, "The Thuggin' EP and its Gibbs-assisted tracks, 'Thuggin' and 'Deep', provide further evidence that Gibbs isn't just special, but he's also doing something right. Rap isn't some sequestered genre built upon scratches and soul samples like it once was. It's constantly evolving, blurring its already muddled gray area with each passing artist leak. Gibbs understands how to evolve with the times, even if his rhymes and rhyme patterns sound vaguely similar. Plus, as Hip-Hop critic Tom Breihan once said about Gibbs' rapping, 'he just doesn't fuck up, ever.'"

== Track listing ==
- All tracks were produced by Madlib.

No.	Title	Writer(s)	Length
1.	"Thuggin'" (Vocal)	F. Tipton; O. Jackson; J. Sherylee	3:21
2.	"Thuggin'" (Instrumental)	O. Jackson; J. Sherylee	3:21
3.	"Riot Call" (Bonus Beat)	O. Jackson	2:07
4.	"Deep" (Vocal)	F. Tipton; O. Jackson	2:08
5.	"Deep" (Instrumental)	O. Jackson	2:03
6.	"Cold On the Blvd" (Bonus Beat)	O. Jackson	1:19
Total length:			14:19
