= 1123 (album) =

Studio album by BJ the Chicago Kid
- Released: July 26, 2019
- Recorded: 2018–2019
- Genre: R&B
- Length: 48:29
- Label: Motown

BJ the Chicago Kid chronology
| In My Mind (2016) | 1123 (2019) | Gravy (2023) |

1123 is the third studio album by American singer-songwriter BJ the Chicago Kid, named after his birthday. The album was released on July 26, 2019, by Motown Records. The album features guest appearances from Anderson .Paak, JID, Buddy, Kent Jamz, Eric Bellinger, Rick Ross, Offset and Afrojack. It received a nomination for Best R&B Album at the 62nd Annual Grammy Awards.

== Release ==
On November 22, 2019, the deluxe edition of the album was released with three additional tracks including "Not Coming Back" with PJ Morton, "Time Today (Remix)" with Ari Lennox, and "Roses".

== Critical reception ==
Professional ratings
Aggregate scores
| Source | Rating |
|---|---|
| Metacritic | 74/100 |
Review scores
| Source | Rating |
| AllMusic | 3.5/5 stars |
| Exclaim! | 8/10 |
| Entertainment Weekly | B− |
| Pitchfork | 7.2/10 |

1123 received generally positive reviews from critics. At Metacritic, which assigns a normalized rating out of 100 to reviews from critics, the album received an average score of 74, which indicates "generally favorable reviews", based on four reviews.

=== Awards ===
| Year | Ceremony | Category | Result | Ref. |
|---|---|---|---|---|
| 2020 | Grammy Awards | Best R&B Album | Nominated | |

== Track listing ==
| No. | Title | Producer(s) | Length |
|---|---|---|---|
| 1. | "Feel the Vibe" (featuring Anderson .Paak) | Aaron Sledge, M Millz & Danja | 4:00 |
| 2. | "Champagne" | Aaron Sledge, Rico Love & Danja | 3:41 |
| 3. | "Get Away" (featuring JID, Buddy and Kent Jamz) | Aaron Sledge & Karriem Riggins | 4:43 |
| 4. | "Time Today" | Andre Harris & Jairus ‘J-Mo’ Mozee | 3:19 |
| 5. | "Can't Wait" | Aaron Sledge, Sap, Eric Kovacs & Cool N Dre | 4:48 |
| 6. | "Back It Up" (featuring Eric Bellinger) | Aaron Sledge & Bongo | 4:49 |
| 7. | "1123's Playa's Intro" | Cool N Dre | 0:10 |
| 8. | "Playa's Ball" (featuring Rick Ross) | Aaron Sledge, Cool N Dre & 808-Ray | 4:13 |
| 9. | "Too Good" | Aaron Sledge & Jairus ‘J-Mo’ Mozee | 3:23 |
| 10. | "Close" | by Tubb Young & BJ the Chicago Kid | 3:50 |
| 11. | "Rather Be with You" | by Tubb Young | 4:28 |
| 12. | "Worryin' Bout Me" (featuring Offset) | Aaron Sledge, Ali P & C Gutta | 3:55 |
| 13. | "Reach" (featuring Afrojack) | Aaron Sledge, Giorgio Tuinfort & Afrojack | 3:10 |
| Total length: | | | 48:29 |

1123 (Deluxe Edition)
| No. | Title | Producer(s) | Length |
|---|---|---|---|
| 14. | "Time Today (Remix)" (featuring Ari Lennox) | Andre Harris & Jairus ‘J-Mo’ Mozee | 3:19 |
| 15. | "Not Coming Back" (featuring PJ Morton) | Tubb Young | 2:37 |
| 16. | "Roses" | Geoffro Cause & Michael Hernandez | 3:01 |
