= In My Mind (BJ the Chicago Kid album) =

Studio album by BJ the Chicago Kid
- Released: February 19, 2016
- Recorded: 2015 at 17 Hertz Studio in North Hollywood, CA
- Genre: R&B
- Length: 62:16
- Label: Motown
- Producer: Ethiopia Habtemariam (exec.); BJ the Chicago Kid; Mike & Keys; DJ Khalil; Cornelio "Corn" Austin; Sean Cooper; DJ Reflex; Matthew Edwards; District 9; Aaron Renner; Jairus Mozee; Joe Syring; Lamar Edwards; Da Internz; Aaron Michael Cox; David Haddon

BJ the Chicago Kid chronology
| Pineapple Now-Laters (2012) | In My Mind (2016) | 1123 (2019) |

Singles from In My Mind
- 1. "Church" Released: August 21, 2015; 2. "The Resume" Released: December 4, 2015

In My Mind is the second studio album by American singer-songwriter BJ the Chicago Kid. The album, which serves as his major label debut, was released by Motown, on February 19, 2016. In My Mind received a nomination for Best R&B Album at the 59th Annual Grammy Awards.

== Background ==
The album was recorded in roughly 30 days, including several nights where BJ slept in the studio. Some of the collaborations on the album, including Kendrick Lamar and Chance the Rapper, were formed with artists that BJ had been friends with for many years prior. BJ was initially introduced to Big K.R.I.T. on Twitter through a mutual friend, which led to the song "The Resume." The pair did not meet in person until the first day of the tour for the album.

== Critical reception ==
Professional ratings
Aggregate scores
| Source | Rating |
|---|---|
| Metacritic | 84/100 |
Review scores
| Source | Rating |
| AllMusic | 4/5 stars |
| Consequence of Sound | B− |
| Exclaim! | 9/10 |
| HipHopDX | 4.2/5 |
| Pitchfork Media | 7.6/10 |

Upon its release, In My Mind received critical acclaim from music critics. At Metacritic, which assigns a normalized rating out of 100 to reviews from mainstream critics, the album received an average score of 84 based on 7 reviews, which indicates "universal acclaim". In a glowing review for Exclaim!, Michael J. Warren called In My Mind "the most earnest soul album in years," saying that the record is "the proof that his ascension is hardly luck, but rather the result of a 15-year grind and a tremendous work ethic."

== Track listing ==
In My Mind track listing
| No. | Title | Writer(s) | Producer(s) | Length |
|---|---|---|---|---|
| 1. | "Intro (Inside My Mind)" | Bryan Sledge; Rex Rideout | BJ the Chicago Kid | 0:41 |
| 2. | "Man Down" (featuring Buddy, Constantine, and PJ Morton) | B. Sledge; Aaron Sledge; Paul Morton, Jr.; Simmie Simms; Michael Cox, Jr.; John Groover; Khalil Abdul-Rahman; Sam Barsh; Daniel Tannenbaum | Mike & Keys; DJ Khalil | 3:29 |
| 3. | "Church" (featuring Chance the Rapper and Buddy) | B. Sledge; Cox; Groover; Simms; Morton; Chancelor Bennett; DeMario Bridges | Mike & Keys; Uncle Dave^{[c]} | 4:47 |
| 4. | "Love Inside" (featuring Isabella) | B. Sledge; Aaron Sledge; Isabelle Chiappini; Cornelio Austin | Austin | 3:47 |
| 5. | "The Resume" (featuring Big K.R.I.T.) | B. Sledge; Sean Cooper; Marcus Kincy; Justin Scott | Cooper; BJ the Chicago Kid^{[c]}; Kincy^{[c]} | 6:03 |
| 6. | "Shine" | B. Sledge; Aaron Sledge; Anthony Jaramillo; Matthew Edwards | DJ Reflex; Edwards | 3:19 |
| 7. | "Wait Til the Morning" (featuring Isa) | B. Sledge; Aaron Sledge; Demario Bridges; Michael Barney; Aaron Bennett; Aaron Renner; Richard Shelton; Loren Hill | District 9; Renner | 4:54 |
| 8. | "Heart Crush" | B. Sledge; Jairus Mozee | Mozee | 4:38 |
| 9. | "Jeremiah/World Needs More Love" (featuring Eric Ingram) | B. Sledge; Ingram; Mozee; Richard Sledge | Mozee | 5:41 |
| 10. | "The New Cupid" (featuring Kendrick Lamar) | B. Sledge; Lamar; Raphael Saadiq | BJ the Chicago Kid; Joe Syring | 5:21 |
| 11. | "Woman's World" | B. Sledge; Aaron Sledge; Austin; Mozee; Syring; Ayaamii Sledge; Calvin Frazier; David Haddon; Rumeal Eggleston | Austin | 3:35 |
| 12. | "Crazy" | B. Sledge; Cox; Groover; Chris Goodman | Mike & Keys; Kincy^{[a]} | 4:02 |
| 13. | "Home" | B. Sledge; Lamar Edwards | Edwards | 3:29 |
| 14. | "Falling On My Face" | B. Sledge; Aaron Sledge; Ernest Clark; Marcos Palacios; Aaron Cox; Harold Lilly | Da Internz; Aaron Michael Cox | 4:01 |
| 15. | "Turnin' Me Up" | B. Sledge; Aaron Sledge; Mozee; Haddon | Mozee; Haddon | 4:29 |
| Total length: | | | | 62:16 |

Note

- ^{^[c]} indicates a co-producer
- ^{^[a]} indicates an additional producer

== Personnel ==
Musicians

- BJ the Chicago Kid – vocals (all tracks), drums (track 13)
- Rex Rideout – programming (1), piano (14)
- THX – additional keyboards (2, 14), synthesizer (12)
- Buddy – additional vocals (2)
- Constantine – additional vocals (2)
- Paul Morton, Jr. – additional vocals (2), organ (9, 15)
- Uncle Dave – guitar (2)
- Mike & Keys – keyboards, programming (2, 12)
- Rumeal Eggleston – bass guitar (4)
- Jairus Mozee – guitar (4, 8, 9, 11, 15), bass guitar (15)
- Jeff Villaluna – guitar (4)
- The Regiment Horns – horns (4, 9, 15)
- Cornelio Austin – keyboards (4, 11), programming (4, 11), piano (11)
- Isabelle Chiappini – spoken word (4)
- Marcus Kincy – additional keyboards (5, 7, 12)
- Sean Cooper – keyboards, programming (5)
- Aaron Sledge – background vocals (6, 7, 14)
- DJ Reflex – piano, programming (6)
- Matthew Edwards – piano, programming (6)
- Matt Jones – strings (6, 11, 14)
- Joakima Lynch – spoken word (7)
- Isa Elliot – vocals (7)
- Kevin Randolph – organ (8), keyboards (15)
- Aaron Camper – additional vocals (9)
- Uncle Chucc – additional vocals (9)
- Eric Ingram – bass guitar (9, 11)
- David Haddon – drums (9, 15)
- Richard Sledge – percussion (9)
- Amaire Johnson – piano (9)
- Calvin Frazier – guitar (9, 11)
- Craig Brockman – piano (15)

Technical

- Robert Vosgien – mastering
- Erik Madrid – mixing (2, 3, 7, 8, 12, 14)
- Richard Furch – mixing (4, 6, 9, 11, 15)
- Joe Syring – mixing (5, 10, 13), engineering (2–15), editing (2, 12, 14)
- Rex Rideout – mixing (13), engineering (1–3, 6–8, 12–14), editing (2, 6, 7, 11, 12, 14)
- Steve Olmon – engineering (2–4, 6–8, 11–14)
- Jazz Sommers – engineering (7)
- Derek Ali – engineering (10)
- Aaron Sledge – vocal production
- Vincent Wu – mixing assistance (2, 3, 7, 8, 12, 14)
- Jorel Corpus – mixing assistance (4, 6, 9, 11, 15)
- Ervin Ablaev – engineering assistance
- Harold Lilly – assistance
- Che Pope – assistance

Artwork

- The Young Astronauts – art direction, photography
- Dead Dilly – art direction

== Charts ==
| Chart (2016) | Peak position |
|---|---|
| US Billboard 200 | 43 |
| US Top R&B/Hip-Hop Albums (Billboard) | 7 |
