= Pineapple Now-Laters =

Studio album by BJ the Chicago Kid
- Released: February 21, 2012
- Recorded: 2011–2012
- Genres: R&B, Neo soul
- Length: 61:40
- Label: M.A.F.E. Music
- Producers: BJ the Chicago Kid, Jairus Mozee, DJ Battlecat, others

BJ the Chicago Kid chronology
Pineapple Now-Laters (2012)	In My Mind (2016)

Pineapple Now-Laters is the debut studio album by American R&B singer-songwriter BJ the Chicago Kid. It was released independently on February 21, 2012, through M.A.F.E. Music. The album blends elements of neo soul, R&B, and hip-hop, showcasing BJ’s signature storytelling and smooth vocal delivery.

== Background ==
Prior to the album, BJ the Chicago Kid had released several mixtapes, including The Life of Love’s Cupid (2011). Pineapple Now-Laters marked his transition into a full-length studio album. The title references the nostalgic candy Now and Laters, symbolizing BJ’s blend of past influences with contemporary sounds.

== Composition ==
The album incorporates soulful melodies, live instrumentation, and hip-hop-infused production. BJ's vocal style draws comparisons to D'Angelo and Marvin Gaye, with lyrical themes centered on love, struggle, and personal growth.

== Track listing ==
All tracks produced by BJ the Chicago Kid unless otherwise noted.

#	Title	Featured artist(s)	Producer(s)	Length
1	"Pineapple Now-Laters (Intro)"	Harold Green, DJ Battlecat	BJ the Chicago Kid	1:59
2	"East Side High 2012 & Forever"	—	BJ the Chicago Kid	1:09
3	"Sex X Money X Sneakers"	—	BJ the Chicago Kid	3:32
4	"Fly Girl Get 'Em"	Freddie Gibbs	BJ the Chicago Kid	3:21
5	"Good Luv'n"	—	Jairus Mozee	3:49
6	"The Big Payback"	—	BJ the Chicago Kid	2:45
7	"Aiight"	—	BJ the Chicago Kid	3:33
8	"Good Love"	—	BJ the Chicago Kid	3:46
9	"White Picket Fence (Interlude)"	—	BJ the Chicago Kid	0:28
10	"Sex Is The Best Breakfast"	—	BJ the Chicago Kid	2:13
11	"Plai Boi"	Boi Josh	BJ the Chicago Kid	3:36
12	"Other Side"	—	BJ the Chicago Kid	3:46
13	"I Want You Back Lady Lady"	—	BJ the Chicago Kid	5:08
14	"The World Is A Ghetto"	Kendrick Lamar, DJ Battlecat, Jairus Mozee	BJ the Chicago Kid	5:59
15	"Dream II"	—	BJ the Chicago Kid	5:47
16	"His Pain II"	Kendrick Lamar	BJ the Chicago Kid	5:29
17	"King Kong"	—	BJ the Chicago Kid	2:20
18	"Hood Stories, Vol. 1"	—	BJ the Chicago Kid	3:50

== Singles ==
The album spawned the single "Good Luv’n", which was later promoted by Motown Records after BJ signed with the label in August 2012.

== Reception ==
Critics praised the album's soulful production and BJ's vocal delivery, highlighting tracks like "His Pain II" featuring Kendrick Lamar. The album helped BJ secure a record deal with Motown, leading to his major-label debut In My Mind (2016).

== Awards and nominations ==
Year	Award	Category	Result	Ref
2012	Soul Train Music Awards	Best Independent R&B Album	Nominated	
2013	NAACP Image Awards	Outstanding New Artist	Nominated	
