= DJ Burn One =

American DJ, producer and songwriter

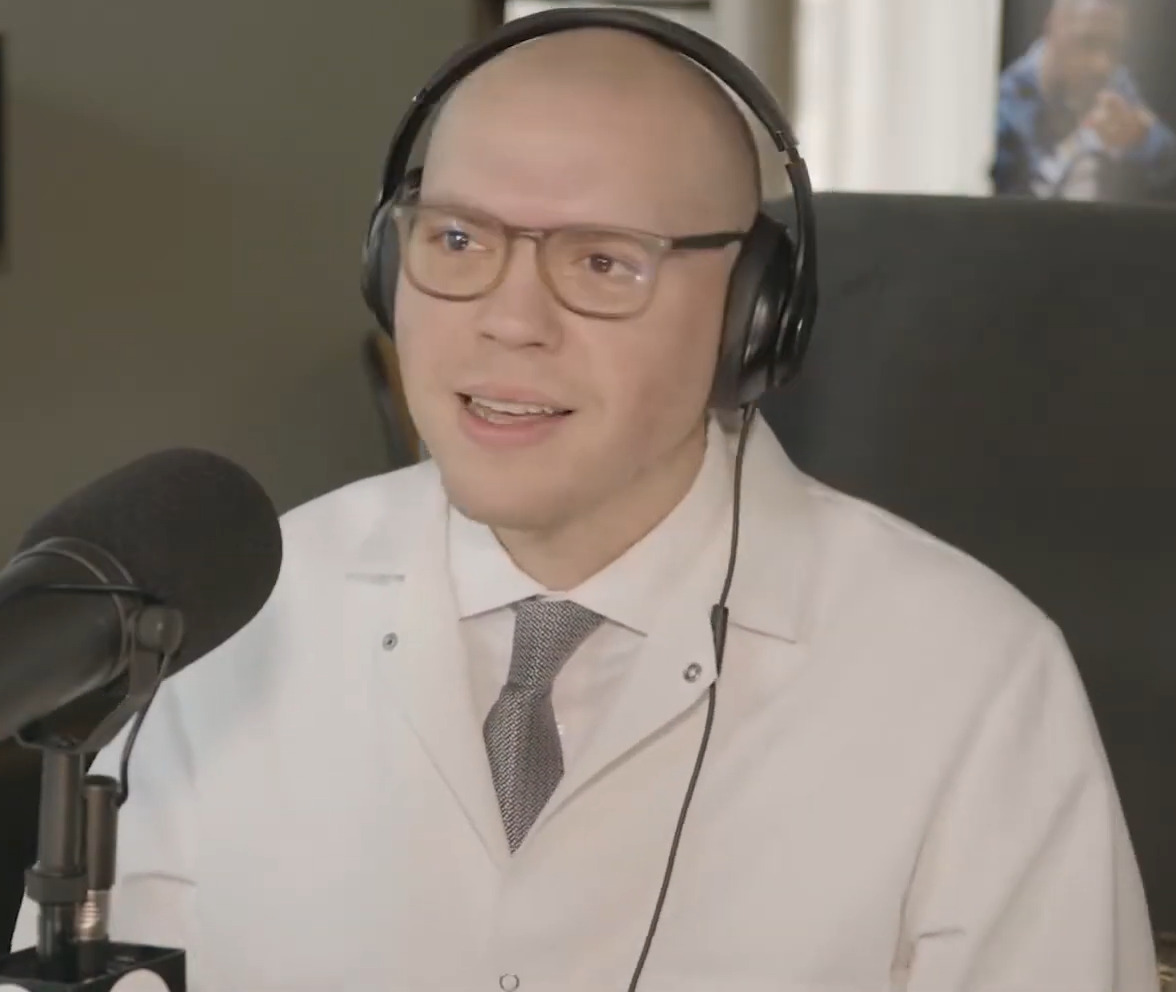
- DJ Burn One in 2025

Background information
- Born: David Shane Sweeten; Hapeville, Georgia, U.S.
- Origin: Atlanta, Georgia, U.S.
- Genres: Hip hop
- Occupations: DJ; record producer; songwriter
- Years active: 2007–present

David Shane Sweeten, professionally known as DJ Burn One, is an American DJ, record producer and songwriter. He has worked with a number of prominent hip-hop artists, including Wrekonize, Gucci Mane, Yelawolf, Rittz, Lil Wyte, SL Jones, Young Dro, ASAP Rocky, Scotty, Pill, and more.

== Early life ==
David Sweeten was born in Hapeville, Georgia. Although Burn One has said that, growing up, his household wasn't very musical, he did grow up listening to a variety of musical genres -- '80s music with his mother; country music with his father—and also joined the church choir at the age of four for several years.

In high school, DJ Burn One started to work at a mom-and-pop music store in Atlanta called Super Sounds. Burn One credits the experience with teaching him how to "sell" music, from a marketing standpoint, to an interested customer. At this time, DJ Burn One was also selling mixtapes locally, to kids at his high school, an experience that led to DJ Burn One developing his professional moniker. In a 2012 interview with Passion of the Weiss, Burn One stated, "So when I'd be in school and selling these CD, I'd have them for like $20-25 dollars…I tried to sell them and say, 'hey, I've got the new T.I. album, it's $25,’ and everyone would say, ‘Oh, man, come on, just burn me one, burn one, burn me one’…All day, all I'd hear is 'Burn One’…so after a while, I was like, you know what? It's kind of got a ring to it."

While in high school, DJ Burn One was formally introduced to the music industry through a chance meeting with a group named Xtaci, at the time signed to T.I.'s Grand Hustle label. The connection with Xtaci allowed DJ Burn One to spend time around the Grand Hustle label, and other artists on the label, like Big Kuntry King and Young Dro, in addition to other big-name artists, like Paul Wall, watching them record, learning how to run studio sessions, and learning about the industry.

=== Beginnings as a DJ ===
DJ Burn One drew inspiration from many artists including “a lot of local musicians, people that put out mixtapes. That was what I listened to growing up, exclusively mix tapes. That’s how I got my start. A friend of mine got a computer program and I’d start by taking little beats and mixing them with a capellas and do little mix tapes. It was a good introduction to find your footing and see where you work.”

While in high school DJ Burn One helped artists to compile their songs into albums. He then began producing exclusive CDs and distributed the mixtapes through various Mom & Pops stores. DJ Burn One has expanded from a traditional DJ to producer and A&R. He has been referred to as a “catalyst for not just the songs, but musical careers paths of artists” such as Gucci Mane, Yelawolf, Pill, and Freddie Gibbs. DJ Burn One is credited as one of the first DJ’s to have a notable online presence.

== Career ==
Shortly after working with Pill to release his 4180: The Prescription mixtape, DJ Burn One says that he "fell out of love with music. A lot of the stuff I was getting I really didn't like." Burn One credits this time with inspiring him to begin producing his own tracks. At this time, Burn One took a year off from being a DJ to focus on his production, making five or six beats a day until his skills improved. He participated in the mixtape Renaissance Gangster by Nashville rapper Starlito.

DJ Burn One also credits his DJ background with helping him to become a better producer. In a 2012 interview with HipHopDX, Burn One said, "I, at least, have a general idea of what gets the crowd moving, and kinda mixing that with sounds that need to be heard right now, the sound I loved growing up and was inspired by."

Since then, DJ Burn One has gone on to produce both individual tracks for artists, like ASAP Rocky, Freddie Gibbs, Rittz, and others, while also working with artists like Wrekonize, Scotty, SL Jones, J NICS, and others, to produce their full mixtapes. DJ Burn One also contributes production to his group, iNDEED.

DJ Burn One has also released a number of instrumental mixtapes throughout the course of his career, often featuring instrumentals that he has produced for other artists. In conjunction with The Smoking Section DJ Burn One released his first instrumental mixtape, Joints, in collaboration with popular hip-hop website DJBooth.net. DJ Burn One went on to release The Ashtray an original project featuring compilations with Five Points Music Group. In 2012, DJ Burn One, in conjunction with popular music blog FADER, released Where There's Smoke, and later that same year, released his third instrumental effort, All Live Everythang.

=== Influences and musical aesthetic ===
In various interviews, DJ Burn One has mentioned Memphis rap like Three 6 Mafia, Playa G, Skinny Pimp, and Gangsta Blac as influences, in addition to Atlanta groups like Organized Noize. Other rap influences include Pimp C and Dr. Dre. Burn One also cites the '80s music that his mother listened to, and the country music that his father listened to as an influence. "Even if I didn't like that music," he said during a 2012 interview with music website Passion of the Weiss, "I could appreciate the song because you could feel it. It evoked emotion."

In a 2012 interview with FADER Magazine, DJ Burn One refers to his own sound as "retro-future, a little old, a little new." DJ Burn One currently produces his instrumentals using Ableton as his sequencer, while also pulling sounds from programs like Logic and Reason. He has also said that he uses a variety of "old keyboards," like the Rhodes and Wurlitzer, as well as newer synthesizer keyboards, like KORG's MicroKorg.

== Other ventures ==
=== Five Points Music Group ===
DJ Burn One formed his own production company, Five Points Music Group. In addition to DJ Burn One, Five Points Music Group consists of Walt Live, who plays keyboards and produces; Ricky Fontaine, who plays guitar; and The Professor, who plays bass, engineers, and produces. Currently, DJ Burn One has two acts signed to his production company; iNDEED, a duo composed of Walt Live and Ricky Fontaine; and Scotty, who is a rapper from Atlanta.
