= BJ the Chicago Kid =

American singer (born 1984)

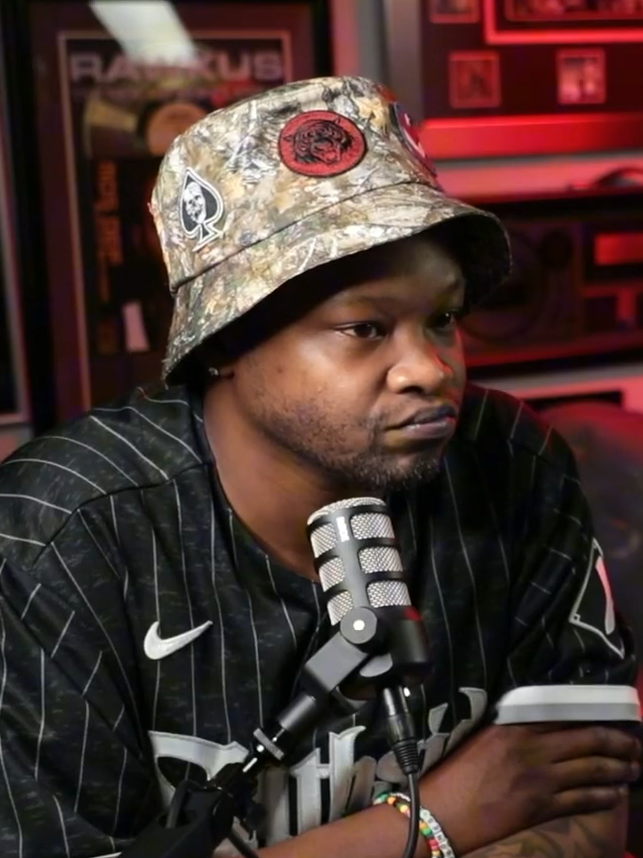
- Sledge in September 2025

Background information
- Also known as: BJ
- Born: Bryan James Sledge; November 23, 1984 (age 41); Chicago, Illinois, U.S.
- Genres: R&B; neo soul; soul
- Occupations: Singer; songwriter
- Years active: 2001–present
- Labels: Motown; M.A.F.E.; Reach The World; RCA
- Website: bjthechicagokid.com

Bryan James Sledge (born November 23, 1984), better known by his stage name BJ the Chicago Kid (or simply BJ), is an American singer and songwriter. Born and raised in Chicago, Sledge is best known for frequently collaborating with Top Dawg Entertainment recording artists Schoolboy Q, Ab-Soul, Kendrick Lamar, and Jay Rock. He has also worked with several other prominent rappers, such as Freddie Gibbs, Warren G, Nekfeu, Chance the Rapper, Big K.R.I.T., GLC, Kanye West, Anderson .Paak, and Joey Badass, among numerous others.

Sledge's first work in the music industry was on a Dave Hollister record in 2001, titled "For You", which he co-wrote alongside Gerald Haddon. Sledge's vocals were first featured on "Impossible", a 2006 song by Chicago rapper Kanye West released in promotion for the 2006 American film Mission: Impossible III. In February 2012, he independently released his debut studio album, Pineapple Now-Laters. Sledge subsequently secured a record deal with Motown, in August 2012. The label then serviced the Pineapple Now-Laters song "Good Luv'n", as Sledge's commercial debut single.

== Life and career ==
=== 1984–2008: Early life and career beginnings ===
Bryan Sledge was born to church choir directors in Chicago. He grew up in the Brainerd neighborhood on Chicago's South Side. Sledge became inspired to pursue a music career after seeing Janet Jackson perform on tour. At the age of 19, he moved to Los Angeles, California, where he became a backup singer for American gospel duo Mary Mary. He also performed on Stevie Wonder's A Time to Love (2005). He later wrote for R&B and gospel artists such as Crystal Aikin, Shirley Caesar, Lalah Hathaway, Joe and Kindred the Family Soul. Later, he performed on Kanye West's single "Impossible," which also features Twista and Keyshia Cole.

=== 2009–2011: Mixtapes ===
In 2009, Sledge released his debut mixtape, A Taste of Chicago, under the moniker BJ the Chicago Kid. Later that year, he followed up with The New Beginning. In 2011, he released his third mixtape, titled The Life of Love's Cupid.

=== 2012–2016: In My Mind and Motown record deal ===
In February 2012, Sledge independently released his debut studio album, titled Pineapple Now-Laters, under M.A.F.E MUSIC LLC. In August 2012, it was announced that Sledge signed a recording contract with American record company, Motown. After inking his new deal with the label, Motown Label Services began promoting the Pineapple Now-Laters track "Good Luv'n," at Urban and Rhythmic radio formats in North America and released it as a single via digital distribution.

In February 2013, Sledge released the track titled "Honey." Sledge's collaboration with American rappers Freddie Gibbs and Problem, titled "Smokin' and Ridin'", is featured on Radio Los Santos in Grand Theft Auto V, the fifth installment in the critically acclaimed video game series. In October 2013, Sledge revealed he began working on his major label debut, which was then announced to be released sometime in 2014. Later that year, in December 2013, Sledge released a Christmas-themed extended play (EP), titled A Soulful Christmas, for free online.

On April 22, 2014, West Coast rapper Schoolboy Q released "Studio", which features vocals from Sledge, as the fourth single from his album Oxymoron. "Studio" acquired Sledge Billboard chart placement and went on to chart in the Top 40 of the US Billboard Hot 100. On November 19, 2014, Sledge released his fourth mixtape, The M.A.F.E. Project. The mixtape features 12 songs and guest appearances from Freddie Gibbs, Sasha Go Hard, Schoolboy Q and Smoke DZA. On December 23, 2014, Motown Records released a song from The M.A.F.E. Project titled "It's True", which features a verse from Schoolboy Q, as a single. The single was accompanied by a music video directed by Verluxe.

On February 19, 2016, Sledge released his major label debut album, In My Mind (2016), featuring collaborations with Chance the Rapper, Big K.R.I.T., and Kendrick Lamar. The album’s standout tracks, including "Church" and "Turnin’ Me Up," solidifying his reputation as a leading voice in contemporary R&B.

=== Continued success and Grammy recognition (2017–present) ===
Sledge continued to release music that resonated with fans, including the mixtapes The Lost Files: Cuffing Season (2016), and A Tribute to Confessions (2017). In 2018, he released the EP The Opening Ceremony.

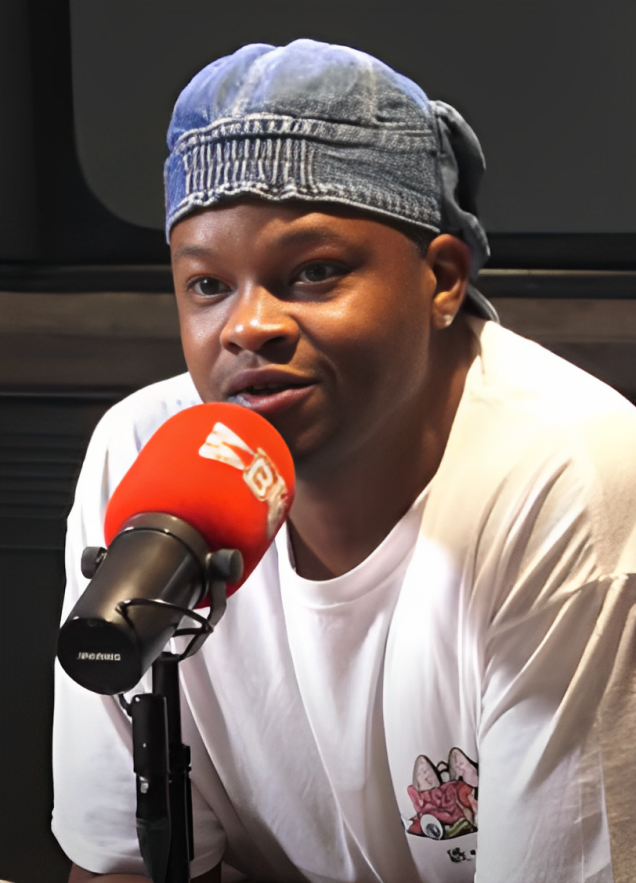
Sledge in July 2019

His third studio album, 1123 was released on July 26, 2019. The album earned him two Grammy nominations for Best R&B Album, and Best Traditional R&B Performance for the song Time Today.

In May 2023, it was announced that BJ The Chicago Kid had signed with the RCA Records distributed label Reach The World, which was founded by producer Yeti Beats. Primarily produced by Yeti Beats, Sledge released his fourth album, Gravy (2023), further showcasing his evolution as an artist.

== Discography ==
Studio albums

- Pineapple Now-Laters (2012)
- In My Mind (2016)
- 1123 (2019)
- Gravy (2023)

EPs

- he Opening Ceremony (2018)

Mixtapes

- A Taste of Chicago (2009)
- The New Beginning (2009)
- The Life of Love's Cupid (2011)
- A Soulful Christmas (2013)
- The M.A.F.E. Project (2014)
- The Lost Files: Cuffing Season (2016)
- A Tribute to Confessions (2017)

== Music videos ==
List of music videos, with directors, showing year released
Title	Year	Director(s)
"Good Luv'n"	2012	Jerome D.
"Perfect"	2014	Jerome D.
"Real Love Never Dies"	2014	Jerome D.
"It's True" (featuring Schoolboy Q)	2014	Verluxe
"That Girl" (featuring OG Maco)	2015	—N/a
"Church" (featuring Chance the Rapper and Buddy)	2015	Scott Lazes
"Nothin' But Love" (featuring Joey Bada$$)	2015	—N/a
"The Resume" (featuring Big K.R.I.T.)	2015	Scott Lazes
"Love Inside" (featuring Isabella)	2016	—N/a
"Turnin' Me Up"	2016	—N/a
"The New Cupid" (featuring Kendrick Lamar)	2016	Matt Barnes
"Woman's World"	2016	—N/a

== Awards and nominations ==
Grammy Awards
Year	Category	Nominated work	Result
2014	Best Rap/Sung Collaboration	Studio - Schoolboy Q Featuring BJ The Chicago Kid	Nominated
2017	Best R&B Album	In My Mind	Nominated
2017	Best R&B Performance	Turnin' Me Up	Nominated
2017	Best Traditional R&B Performance	Woman's World	Nominated
2020	Best R&B Album	1123	Nominated
2020	Best Traditional R&B Performance	Time Today	Nominated
2021	Best Traditional R&B Performance	Bring It On Home To Me - BJ The Chicago Kid, PJ Morton, Kenyon Dixon & Charlie Bereal	Nominated
