= Freddie Gibbs discography =

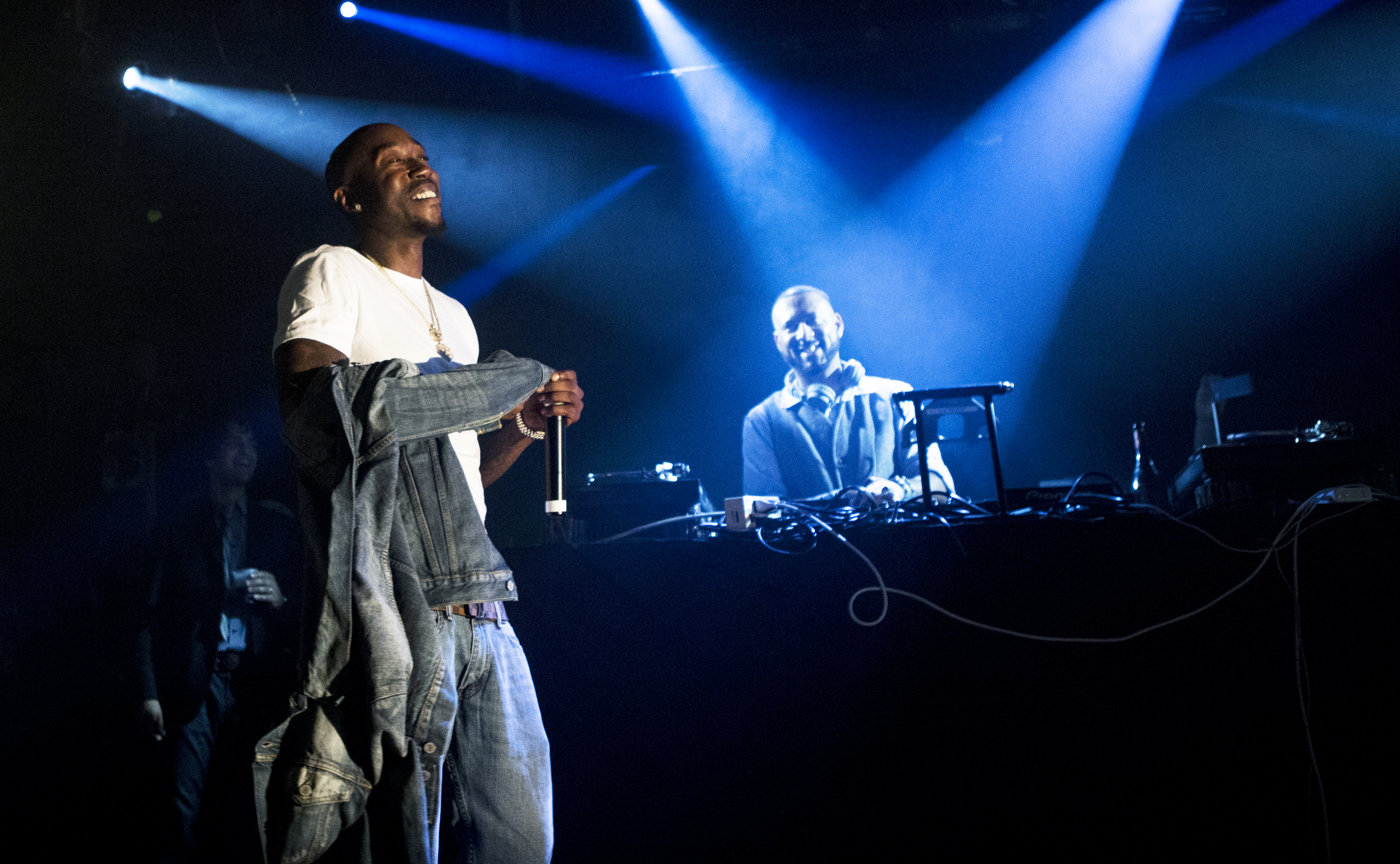
- Gibbs (front) performing with Madlib in March 2014
- Studio albums: 5
- EPs: 12
- Singles: 23
- Compilation mixtapes: 2
- Mixtapes: 16
- Collaborative albums: 5

The discography of American rapper Freddie Gibbs consists of five solo studio albums, four collaborative studio albums, twenty-three singles, twelve extended plays, twenty mixtapes, and two compilation mixtapes.

In 2013, Freddie Gibbs released his debut solo studio album ESGN. It was followed by the collaborative album Piñata with producer Madlib in 2014, which became his first entry on the US Billboard 200 chart, peaking at number 39. The following year, Gibbs released his second solo album, Shadow of a Doubt.

His next studio release was You Only Live 2wice in 2017, followed by 2018's Fetti, a collaboration with The Alchemist and Currensy, and his debut commercial mixtape Freddie. In 2019, he and Madlib released their second collaborative studio album Bandana, followed by another collaboration with The Alchemist, 2020's Alfredo, which became Gibbs' highest-charting album to date, peaking at number 15 on the Billboard 200 chart.

== Albums ==
=== Studio albums ===
List of studio albums, with selected chart positions
Title	Album details	Peak chart positions						
Title	Album details	US	US R&B/HH	US Rap	US Indie	AUS	BEL (FL)	CAN
ESGN	Released: June 19, 2013; Label: ESGN, Empire; Format: CD, digital download	—	—	—	40	—	—	—
Shadow of a Doubt	Released: November 20, 2015; Label: ESGN, Empire; Format: CD, LP, digital download	76	11	8	4	—	—	—
You Only Live 2wice	Released: March 31, 2017; Label: ESGN, Empire; Format: LP, digital download	124	—	—	13	—	—	—
Soul Sold Separately	Released: September 30, 2022; Label: ESGN, Warner; Format: CD, LP, cassette, digital download	11	5	3	—	91	182	60
You Only Die 1nce	Released: November 1, 2024; Label: ESGN, AWAL; Format: CD, LP, digital download	105	41	—	16	—	—	—

=== Collaborative albums ===
List of collaborative albums, with selected chart positions
Title	Album details	Peak chart positions						
Title	Album details	US	US R&B/HH	US Rap	US Indie	CAN	UK	UK R&B
Piñata (with Madlib)	Released: March 18, 2014; Label: Madlib Invazion; Format: CD, LP, cassette, digital download	39	11	7	6	—	—	16
Fetti (with Currensy and the Alchemist)	Released: October 31, 2018; Label: ESGN, ALC, Jet Life, Empire; Format: LP, digital download	—	—	—	20	—	—	—
Bandana (with Madlib)	Released: June 28, 2019; Label: ESGN, Keep Cool, Madlib Invazion, RCA; Format: CD, LP, digital download	21	13	10	—	47	88	–
Alfredo (with the Alchemist)	Released: May 29, 2020; Label: ESGN, ALC, Empire; Format: CD, LP, cassette, digital download	15	12	11	3	76	—	—
Alfredo 2 (with the Alchemist)	Released: July 25, 2025; Label: ESGN, ALC, Virgin; Format: CD, LP, cassette, digital download	13	6	4	1	49	28	1

== Extended plays ==
List of extended plays, with selected chart positions
Title	EP details	Peak chart positions
Title	EP details	US R&B/HH
The Miseducation of Freddie Gibbs - EP	Released: May 19, 2009; Label: Gibbs; Format: Digital download	—
Playa - EP	Released: July 27, 2010; Label: Innovative Leisure; Format: LP, digital download	—
Str8 Killa	Released: August 3, 2010; Label: Decon, Gibbs Family; Format: LP, digital download	48
Lord Giveth, Lord Taketh Away (with Statik Selektah)	Released: June 24, 2011; Label: CTE, Showoff; Format: LP, digital download	—
Thuggin' - EP (with Madlib)	Released: December 13, 2011; Label: Madlib Invazion; Format: LP, digital download	—
Shame - EP (with Madlib)	Released: July 10, 2012; Label: Madlib Invazion; Format: LP, digital download	—
Deeper - EP (with Madlib)	Released: September 24, 2013; Label: Madlib Invazion; Format: LP, digital download	—
The Tonite Show (with DJ Fresh)	Released: May 13, 2014; Label: Fresh in the Flesh, Empire; Format: CD, LP, digital download	—
Knicks Remix - EP (with Madlib)	Released: November 18, 2014; Label: Madlib Invazion; Format: LP, digital download	—
Pronto	Released: March 9, 2015; Label: ESGN; Format: Digital download	—
Flat Tummy Tea - EP (with Madlib)	Released: April 20, 2019; Label: Madlib Invazion; Format: LP, digital download	—
Singles	Released: 7 January 2022; Label: ESGN, Warner; Format: LP, digital download	—
"—" denotes a title that did not chart, or was not released in that territory.

== Mixtapes ==
List of mixtapes, with selected chart positions
Title	Mixtape details	Peak chart positions		
Title	Mixtape details	US	US R&B/HH	US Indie
Full Metal Jackit Vol. 1	Released: November 22, 2003; Label: No Tamin'; Format: Digital download	—	—	—
Full Metal Jackit: The Mixtape Volume II	Released: July 1, 2004; Label: No Tamin'; Format: Digital download	—	—	—
This Is My Hustle: Volume 1	Released: April 11, 2005; Label: No Tamin'; Format: Digital download	—	—	—
Big Bizness: The Mixtape Vol. 1	Released: 2005; Label: No Tamin'; Format: Digital download	—	—	—
Big Bizness: Mixtape Volume Two	Released: December 5, 2005; Label: No Tamin'; Format: Digital download	—	—	—
Welcome 2 Gangster Island: Soundtrack For The Streets (with Sani G)	Released: 2007; Label: No Tamin'; Format: Digital download	—	—	—
Live from Gary Indiana	Released: June 22, 2007; Label: No Tamin'; Format: Digital download	—	—	—
Big Bizness: Volume 3	Released: June 28, 2007; Label: No Tamin'; Format: Digital download	—	—	—
The Labels Tryin' to Kill Me!	Released: February 22, 2009; Label: The Smoking Section; Format: Digital download	—	—	—
Live from Gary Indiana: Part Two	Released: April 29, 2009; Label: No Tamin', Gibbs; Format: Digital download	—	—	—
The Miseducation of Freddie Gibbs	Released: May 21, 2009; Label: Gibbs; Format: Digital download	—	—	—
Midwestgangstaboxframecadillacmuzik (with DJ Skee)	Released: August 27, 2009; Label: Gibbs; Format: Digital download	—	—	—
Str8 Killa No Filla	Released: July 29, 2010; Label: ESGN, Showoff, CTE; Format: Digital download	—	—	—
Gangster Island Volume 2: Soundtrack For The Streets (with JFK)	Released: December 12, 2010; Label: No Tamin'; Format: Digital download	—	—	—
Fuckin' Wit Fred	Released: June 12, 2011; Label: No Tamin', Str8 Slammin'; Format: Digital download	—	—	—
Cold Day in Hell	Released: October 31, 2011; Label: ESGN, CTE; Format: CD, digital download	—	—	—
Baby Face Killa (with DJ Drama)	Released: September 25, 2012; Label: ESGN, CTE; Format: CD, digital download	—	—	—
Freddie	Released: June 22, 2018; Labels: ESGN, Empire; Format: CD, LP, digital download	142	16	16

== Singles ==
List of singles as lead artist, showing year released and album name
Title	Year	Certifications	Album
"Oil Money" (with Chuck Inglish, Chip tha Ripper, Bun B and Dan Auerbach)	2010		Str8 Killa
"National Anthem (Fuck the World)"	2010		Str8 Killa
"Play the Game" (with Big K.R.I.T. and Statik Selektah)	2011		Population Control
"Heads of the Heads" (with GLC)	2011		Non-album single
"Built for This" (with Method Man and Streetlife)	2012		The Man with the Iron Fists (soundtrack)
"One Eighty Seven" (with Problem)	2013		ESGN
"Show Sumn" (with League of Starz, Problem, Skeme, Jay Rock, Glasses Malone and Bad Lucc)	2013		Non-album single
"Old English" (with A$AP Ferg and Young Thug)	2014	RIAA: Gold	Mass Appeal Vol. 1
"My Dope House"	2015		Non-album single
"Fuckin' up the Count"	2015		Shadow of a Doubt
"Extradite" (featuring Black Thought)	2015		Shadow of a Doubt
"Packages" (featuring ManMan Savage)	2015		Shadow of a Doubt
"Money, Cash, Hoes"	2016		Non-album single
"Crushed Glass"	2017		You Only Live 2wice
"Flat Tummy Tea" (with Madlib)	2019		Bandana
"Crime Pays" (with Madlib)	2019		Bandana
"Giannis" (with Madlib, featuring Anderson Paak)	2019		Bandana
"Never Had Shit" (with Hungry)	2019		Non-album single
"1985" (with the Alchemist)	2020		Alfredo
"Don't Be Mad at Me (Remix)" (with Problem and Snoop Dogg)	2020		Non-album single
"4 Thangs" (featuring Big Sean)	2020		Soul Sold Separately
"Gang Signs" (featuring Schoolboy Q)	2021		Soul Sold Separately
"Big Boss Rabbit"	2021		Soul Sold Separately

== Other charted songs ==
List of other charted songs, with selected chart positions
Title	Year	Peak chart positions		Album
Title	Year	US Bub.	US R&B/HH	Album
"Ensalada" (with the Alchemist featuring Anderson .Paak)	2025	21	40	Alfredo 2

== Guest appearances ==
Title	Year	Other artist(s)	Album
"The True"	2008	The Knux	Remind Me in 3 Days...
"Contact"	2010	El Prez	Animal Style!
"Something New"	2010	YP	Closed Sessions Vol. 2
"Field Nigga Blues"	2010	Mikkey Halsted, BJ the Chicago Kid	The Darkroom
"The M.O.B."	2010	Yukmouth, Jay Hood	Thuggin' & Mobbin'
"On My Own"	2010	Mikkey Halsted	The Breakout
"38"	2011	Young Jeezy	Thug Motivation 103: Hustlerz Ambition
"Rough"	2011	DJ Drama, Young Jeezy,	Third Power
"Nicks to Bricks"	2011	Young Jeezy	The Real Is Back 2
"Gotta See This"	2011	Young Jeezy, JW	The Real Is Back 2
"Sittin' Low"	2011	Young Jeezy, Scrilla	The Real Is Back 2
"Caught in a Daze"	2011	David Dallas	The Rose Tint
"Chill"	2011	Trackademicks, Phonte and 1-O.A.K.	Fresh Coastin'
"Hard as They Come (Act I)"	2011	CunninLynguists	Oneirology
"Illegal"	2011	Ski Beatz	24 Hour Karate School Part 2
"It's All About Me"	2011	Cory Mo, Z-Ro, Killa Kyleon	Country Rap Tunes
"Let Me Ride"	2011	KD	G-Fluid
"Mafia"	2011	Hit Skrewface, D-Edge	Hitsville USA Vol. 2
"Near the End"	2011	Outasight	Get It Together
"On My Shit"	2011	211	Product of the Block 2
"Scottie Pippen"	2011	Curren$y, The Alchemist	Covert Coup
"Talk to Me"	2011	Young Jeezy, Eminem	—N/a
"VCR"	2011	The Hood Internet, Class Actress, Telli of Ninjasonik	Uncovered – Volume 3 (A Unique Collection of Cool Covers)
"Cloud of Endo"	2012	Tony Williams, STS	Some Of My Best Rappers are Friends
"Come Come"	2012	The Kickdrums, Hot as Sun	Follow the Leaders
"Criminal"	2012	ZZ Ward	Til the Casket Drops
"Kush Cologne"	2012	Yukmouth, Belo, Smiggz	Half Baked
"Joy & Pain"	2012	ANTHM	Joy & Pain
"Make it Out Alive"	2012	1982 (Statik Selektah & Termanology), Crooked I	2012
"Remember"	2012	Sean Price	Mic Tyson
"Till the Angels Come"	2012	Domo Genesis, The Alchemist, Prodigy	No Idols
"Trap Assassin"	2013	DJ Muggs	Bass for Your Face
"New Day"	2013	Raekwon	Lost Jewlry
"Make Believe"	2013	Statik Selektah, Easy Money, Termanology	Extended Play
"Need More"	2013	Joey Fatts	Chipper Jones Vol. 2
"Black Gringo"	2013	Qualmes	—N/a
"Listen"	2013	2Eleven	No Brakes
"Tesla"	2013	The Alchemist, Domo Genesis, Hodgy Beats	SSUR
"F'N Right"	2013	Jon Connor	Unconscious State
"In the Rain"	2013	J. Stalin, The World's Freshest	Miracle & Nightmare on 10th Street
"The Return"	2013	Danny Brown	Old
"I Don't Give a Fuck 3.0"	2013	Peter Jackson, Jon Connor, SwizZz, Aasim, Consequence	Good Company
"Holdin On"	2013	Flume	Flume Deluxe Edition
"Street Sweeper (Remix)"	2014	JMSN	Street Sweeper (Remix)
"Sellin' Dope"	2014	Mike Dean	Grand Theft Auto V OST (Enhanced version)
"B.A.M."	2014	BJ the Chicago Kid	The M.A.F.E. Project
"Demise"	2014	Ransom	Pain & Glory
"Hit Em Hard"	2014	The Game, Bobby Shmurda, Skeme	Blood Moon: Year of the Wolf
"Carry On"	2014	Statik Selektah, Joey Badass	What Goes Around
"Cherry Pie"	2014	Freeway, The Jacka, Jynx	Highway Robbery
"Wake Up Call"	2014	Awar & Vanderslice	The Winning Team
"Clap"	2014	Mr. Green, Chill Moody, Apollo The Great	Live from the Streets
"One Day"	2014	Young Giftz	—N/a
"Out of Focus"	2014	Noelz Vedere	Bittersweet Victory
"THOT"	2014	Hit Screwface	—N/a
"Kids on the Block"	2014	Buddy	Idle Time
"Wid It"	2014	Trae tha Truth, The World's Freshest	The Tonite Show with Trae Tha Truth
"Welcome to Los Santos"	2015	The Alchemist, Oh No, MC Eiht, Kokane	Welcome to Los Santos
"Born Bad"	2015	The Alchemist, Oh No, Popcaan	Welcome to Los Santos
"Fetti"	2015	The Alchemist, Oh No, Curren$y	Welcome to Los Santos
"Who's That"	2015	Apollo Brown, Maffew Ragazino	Grandeur
"Decisions"	2015	EDIDON, Krayzie Bone, Young Noble	The Hope Dealer, Pt. 1
"Labor Day"	2016	Termanology, Action Bronson, Chace Infinite, Scram Jones, Wais P, Rob White	Cameo King III
"Make Believe"	2016	Termanology, Ea$y Money	Cameo King III
"Lay Back"	2016	Jazzy Bazz	P-Town
"Body for My Zipcode"	2016	DJ Drama, Dave East.	Quality Street Music 2
"Stash House"	2016	Curren$y	Andretti 12/30
"Back Home"	2016	Zeds Dead	—N/a
"Damn"	2016	Joyryde	Brave
"7 Digits"	2017	Rich Gains, ZZ Ward, Nico Segal	Gains
"Change of Mind"	2018	Phonte	No News Is Good News
"What You Tryna Do?"	2019	Izzy Strange	—N/a
"Fire Like Tyndall"	2019	Vegyn	Only Diamonds Cut Diamonds
"Wax On"	2019	Injury Reserve	Injury Reserve
"S.N.O.R.T."	2020	The Alchemist, Boldy James	The Price of Tea in China
"9 to 5"	2020	Adam Snow, Tedy Andreas	As Luck Would Have It
"Nightrider"	2020	Tom Misch, Yussef Dayes	What Kinda Music
"$500 Ounces"	2020	Westside Gunn, Roc Marciano	Pray for Paris
"42"	2020	Adam Snow, Josh Alias, Nicholas Craven	42
"Kane Train"	2020	Machinedrum	A View of U
"Seen Everything but Jesus"	2020	Conway the Machine	From King to a God
"One Way Flight"	2020	Benny the Butcher	Burden of Proof
"We Want Justice Dammit!"	2021	Godfather of Harlem, Swizz Beatz, Shoota93	Godfather of Harlem: Season 2 Soundtrack
"What I Look Like"	2021	Maxo Kream	Weight of the World
"On One"	2021	Joyce Wrice	Overgrown
"False Flowers"	2021	The Alchemist, Boldy James, Currensy	
"Empathy"	2021	Lloyd Banks	The Course of the Inevitable
"Life Is Like a Dice Game"	2021	Nas, Cordae	—N/a
"War Time"	2021	Artz, Bugy	—N/a
"Much Money"	2021	Kenny Mason	Angelic Hoodrat: Supercut
"Champagne Glasses"	2022	Cordae, Stevie Wonder	From a Birds Eye View
"On God"	2022	Meechy Darko	Gothic Luxury
"Demise"	2022	Ransom	—N/a
"Letstalkaboutit"	2023	Aminé, Kaytranada	Kaytraminé
"Truth or Dare"	2023	Chika	Samson: The Album
"Tonight"	2023	Tony Touch, Maxo, Jadakiss	The Def Tape
"Liquor Store in the Sky"	2023	BJ the Chicago Kid	Gravy
"Show & Tell"	2023	Mick Jenkins	The Patience
"Street Made"	2023	Scarface, DJ Muggs	Soul Assassins 3
"Phoenix"	2023	Lord Apex	The Good Fight
"Back to Me"	2024	¥$ (Kanye West, Ty Dolla Sign)	Vultures 1
"Ohio"	2024	Schoolboy Q	Blue Lips
"Mutt (Remix)"	2024	Leon Thomas	—N/a
"Carpinteria"	2024	Rae Khalil	Crybaby

== Music videos ==
List of music videos, showing year released and directors
As lead artist
Title	Year	Director(s)	Ref.
"What It Be Like"	2009	Unknown	
"The Ghetto"	2010	Brandon "N2ition" Riley	
"Do Wrong Pt. 2"	2010	Eric Swiecinski	
"Serve or Get Served"	2010	Don the Man	
"Lord Giveth, Lord Taketh Away"	2011	Oliver Whitehouse	
"BFK"	2012	Teho Media	
"The Hard" (with Dana Williams)	2012	Unknown	
"Eastside Moonwalker"	2013	John Colombo	
"Lay It Down"	2013	Will Gates	
"Have U Seen Her" (featuring Hit Skrewface)	2013	Gregory Buissereth	
"Deuces"	2013	Danny Manhattan	
"One Eighty Seven" (with Problem)	2014	John Colombo	
"On Some G Shit"	2014	Unknown	
"Thuggin'" (with Madlib)	2014	Jonah Schwartz	
"Shame" (with Madlib; featuring BJ the Chicago Kid)	2014	Jonah Schwartz	
"Deeper" (with Madlib)	2014	Jonah Schwartz	
"Pronto"	2015	Nick Walker	
"Fuckin' up the Count"	2015	Jonah Schwartz	
"Freddie Gordy"	2016	Jonah Schwartz	
"Crushed Glass"	2017	Eric Nelson	
"No Prblms Freestyle"	2017	Eric Nelson	
"Andrea"	2017	Eric Nelson	
"Automatic"	2018	Trevor Penick	
"Death Row" (featuring 03 Greedo)	2018	Trevor Penick and Ben "Lambo" Lambert	
"Crime Pays" (with Madlib)	2019	Nick Walker	
"Giannis" (with Madlib; featuring Anderson Paak)	2019	Nick Walker and M. Corey Whitted	
"Half Manne Half Cocaine" (with Madlib)	2019	Unknown	
"Gat Damn" (with Madlib)	2019	M. Corey Whitted	
"1985" (with The Alchemist)	2020	Nick Walker	
"Scottie Beam" (with The Alchemist; featuring Rick Ross)	2020	James "JMP" Pereira	
"Frank Lucas" (with The Alchemist; featuring Benny the Butcher)	2020	Will Gates	
"Babies & Fools" (with The Alchemist; featuring Conway the Machine)	2020	James "JMP" Pereira	
"4 Thangs" (featuring Big Sean and Hit-Boy)	2020	Nick Walker	
"Gang Signs" (featuring Schoolboy Q)	2021	Aaron Hymes	
