= Continuance (Currensy and the Alchemist album) =

Studio album by Currensy & the Alchemist
- Released: February 18, 2022
- Genre: Hip-hop
- Length: 37:24
- Labels: Jet Life, ALC Records, Empire
- Producer: Alchemist

Currensy chronology
Pilot Talk IV (2021)	Continuance (2022)	Spring Clean 2 (2022)

Alchemist chronology
Haram (2021)	Continuance (2022)	The Elephant Man's Bones (2022)

Continuance is the first studio album by American duo Currensy & the Alchemist. It was released on February 18, 2022, through Jet Life Recordings, ALC Records and Empire Distribution. Production was handled entirely by the Alchemist. It features guest appearances from Babyface Ray, Boldy James, Havoc, Larry June, Styles P and Wiz Khalifa. The album peaked at number 200 on the Billboard 200 and number 28 on the Independent Albums in the United States.

The album marks the fourth project by the duo, which was preceded by two mixtapes Covert Coup in 2011 and The Carrollton Heist in 2016, and the extended play Fetti in 2018 in collaboration with rapper Freddie Gibbs.

== Critical reception ==
Professional ratings
Aggregate scores
Source	Rating
Metacritic	80/100
Review scores
Source	Rating
AllMusic	4/5 stars
Clash	8/10
HipHopDX	4/5
Pitchfork	7.2/10
RapReviews	6.5/10

Continuance was met with generally favorable reviews from music critics. At Metacritic, which assigns a normalized rating out of 100 to reviews from mainstream publications, the album received an average score of 80, based on six reviews.

AllMusic's Fred Thomas wrote that the album's "instrumentals are fluid and bubbling over with unexpected sound combinations". Robin Murray of Clash Music praised the album calling it "a hugely effective partnership, Curren$y's raps – weed, women, the trappings of fame – don't dwell on subtlety, but it's the manner in which they are presented that affords Continuance its depth". Mackenzie Cummings-Grady of HipHopDX stated: "if Covert Coup was the beginning of two trailblazers starting to find their path, then Continuance is the victory lap as they reflect with gratitude and satisfaction over the legends they've built for themselves". Dylan Green of Pitchfork found the album to be "a space for two rap veterans who are comfortable enough with their chemistry to continue prodding at their margins". Matt Jost of RapReviews wrote that "while Covert Coup was more varied musically, the familiarity of the arrangements and orchestration on Continuance ensure a certain timelessness".

== Track listing ==
No.	Title	Length
1.	"Half Moon Mornings"	2:15
2.	"Reese's Cup"	1:38
3.	"No Yeast" (featuring Boldy James)	4:03
4.	"Obsession"	2:45
5.	"Corvette Rally Stripes" (featuring Havoc and Wiz Khalifa)	4:11
6.	"Whale Watching" (featuring Styles P)	3:25
7.	"The Tonight Show"	2:28
8.	"Signature Move"	2:19
9.	"Louis Baggage" (featuring Babyface Ray)	2:30
10.	"The Final Board"	3:57
11.	"Jodeci Tape"	2:04
12.	"Endurance Runners" (featuring Larry June)	3:10
13.	"Kool & the Gang"	2:39
Total length:		37:24

== Personnel ==
- Shante "Currensy" Franklin – vocals
- James Clay "Boldy James" Jones III – vocals (track 3)
- Kejuan "Havoc" Muchita – vocals (track 5)
- Cameron "Wiz Khalifa" Thomaz – vocals (track 5)
- David "Styles P" Styles – vocals (track 6)
- Marcellus Rayvon "Babyface Ray" Register – vocals (track 9)
- Larry Eugene "Larry June" Hendricks III – vocals (track 12)
- Alan "The Alchemist" Maman – producer
- Eddie Sancho – mixing
- Joe LaPorta – mastering

== Charts ==
Chart (2022)	Peak position
US Billboard 200	200
US Independent Albums (Billboard)	28
