= Dana Williams (singer) =

American singer-songwriter

- Born: Los Angeles, California, U.S.
- Education: Sarah Lawrence College
- Occupations: Singer; songwriter; musician; poet
- Relatives: David Williams (father); Davida Williams (sister)
- Musical career
- Genres: Folk; jazz; soul
- Instruments: Vocals, guitar
- Years active: 2012–present
- Labels: Independent 2012 - 2018; KIDinaKORNER (Interscope) (2019 - present)
- Website: danawilliamsofficial.com

Dana Williams is an American singer-songwriter, guitarist, and poet from Los Angeles. She rose to prominence in 2014 after placing fourth on the American singing competition series, Rising Star. She is also well known for her numerous YouTube covers, for appearing in a 2014 Apple Christmas commercial entitled "The Song," and for her collaborations with rappers Freddie Gibbs, Boogie, and Rejjie Snow.

Her debut EP, The Lonely One, was released on March 24, 2014. Followed by her second EP Let's Fall released on December 11, 2015 and a third, titled Thank You For The Memories on October 30, 2020, featuring a cover and acoustic versions of several of her singles. Dana has remained active over the years, regularly releasing new singles independently. To date, she has released over 25 singles.

== Early life ==
Dana Williams was born in Los Angeles on July 17 of 1989 to musician and songwriter David Williams, famed for his work with Michael Jackson for over 30 years. Her older sister Davida Williams is an actress. As a child, Williams split her time between Los Angeles, the home of her father, and New York City, the home of her mother. As a child, she also lived for a short time in Vineyard Haven, Massachusetts on Martha's Vineyard during which time she attended Tisbury School. During her childhood, she often accompanied her father to the recording studio and eventually met Michael Jackson because of her father's position as the singer's guitarist. After the studio sessions, Williams would often go home and practice writing love songs due to her father's influence. For a middle school Black History Month project, Williams discovered and learned about legendary Jazz musician Ella Fitzgerald. This project opened Williams up to Jazz music, along with the influence of her maternal grandmother, who was a Jazz singer and often sang songs to Williams and her sister as infants. When she was in fourth grade, Williams was selected to sing "Hard Knock Life (Ghetto Anthem)" with Jay-Z for a Television special. As Williams got older and grew up in New York, she became exposed to the works of Billie Holiday and started to attend and perform at Jazz Clubs throughout the city, particularly Lenox Lounge, which was frequented by Holiday throughout her career. She began writing her own music when she was 14 or 15.

Williams attended Middle School, High School, and College in New York, studying music at both the Masters School and Sarah Lawrence College, where she mastered the guitar and became trained in both classical and contemporary styles of music. At Sarah Lawrence, her primary focus of study was poetry and creative writing. She majored in writing for the majority of her time at Sarah Lawrence, but realized that writing books and poetry would not be enough to make a successful career. She started to write and perform songs more often and eventually picked up a double major in music and poetry during her sophomore year. During college, Williams became an award-winning, published poet, an accomplishment she says influences the poetic and emotional nature of her song lyrics. She cites Louise Glück and Dennis Nurkse as two of her favorite poets, the latter of whom was one of her professors while she was studying at Sarah Lawrence.

== Career ==
Williams served as the opening act for Leighton Meester and Check in the Dark's spring tour in 2012. She was also featured on Freddie Gibbs's 2012 mixtape, Baby Face Killa, for the song "The Hard." She began posting cover songs to YouTube in 2013, and is now most well known for her 2014 collaboration with Meester on Fleetwood Mac's "Dreams", which has garnered more than 6,800,000 views as of January 2018. In 2013, Williams released her debut single, "Keep Me Waiting," ahead of the release of her debut EP, The Lonely One, on March 24, 2014. The song was featured on the soundtrack for Damien Chazelle's 2014 critically acclaimed, Academy Award-winning film Whiplash and featured in his 2016 critically acclaimed film La La Land.

In the summer of 2014, Williams came into national prominence when she participated in the singing competition series Rising Star, where she progressed into the finale and finished in fourth place.

Rising Star performances and results
Stage	Song	Original artist	Date	Percentage		Result
Stage	Song	Original artist	Date	East Coast	West Coast	Result
Auditions	"Stay"	Rihanna	July 6, 2014	87%	84%	Safe (2nd)
Duels	"Will You Still Love Me Tomorrow"	The Shirelles	July 27, 2014	67%	69%	Saved (5th)
Round of 13	"Latch"	Disclosure	August 3, 2014	60%	65%	Saved (8th)
Quarter-finals	"Human"	Christina Perri	August 10, 2014	57%	60%	Safe (5th)
Semi-finals	"Sunday Morning"	Maroon 5	August 17, 2014	75%		Safe (3rd)
Finals	"At Last"	Ray Eberle and Pat Friday	August 24, 2014	30%	N/A	Eliminated (4th)

Later the same year, she was featured in a Christmas commercial for Apple, entitled "The Song," in which she was shown discovering an old recording of her grandmother singing Nat King Cole's "Our Love is Here to Stay" for her husband before he left for the Korean War. The commercial follows Williams as she records her own version of the song, creates a duet with her grandmother's original version, and then surprises her grandmother with the new recording, causing her to tear up. The commercial was met with widespread acclaim from viewers. Williams collaborated with Freddie Gibbs on two more songs in 2015, being the featured vocalist on the track "Diamonds" on his EP entitled Pronto, and on the track "McDuck" for his second album, Shadow of a Doubt. On April 14, 2015, Williams released a collaboration with Toronto producer Swim Good, providing vocals for the song "Callaway." Williams's most recent project, a sophomore EP entitled Let's Fall was released on December 11, 2015, following the release of the lead single, "Fooling Myself." The EP's second single, "Come Back," was released on January 16, 2016. Williams released a music video for the album track "Damage" on April 14, 2016.

Williams is currently represented by her publishing company, Smiggs Songs, and signed an administration deal with the Royalty Network, Inc. on December 11, 2015.

On July 8, 2016, Williams performed a small show at the Base in Alex's Place at the YMCA on Martha's Vineyard. In September 2016, Williams was featured on Boogie's single "Sunroof," from his mixtape Thirst 48 Pt. 2, which was released October 14, 2016. She also provided uncredited vocals on the album track "Nigga Needs." In late 2016, Williams played several live shows at the Hotel Café in Los Angeles, completing a residency on October 27 and then opening for the band Lawrence on November 9. She played a live show at UCB Theater in Los Angeles on November 12.

On March 3, 2017, "Lifeline" was released, a collaborative single between electronic artist Melvv and Williams, who provides featured vocals on the track. Williams was also featured on the Rejjie Snow track "Pink Flower" with Julian Bell in 2017. Williams began working on material for a full-length LP in 2016, which resulted in string of singles throughout 2017 and 2018. Williams's single "No Pressure" was released on July 14, 2017, with the official video following on July 26. "Honey" was released as a single in August 2017 alongside its official music video. On October 27, 2017, "Give Me a Sign" was released, a song by French producer Fakear from his 2017 EP Karmaprana, on which Williams serves as featured vocalist. Williams' original "Drifting" was released shortly after on November 1, alongside its video. "Fragile Ego" was released as a single on December 1, 2017, followed by "There You Go" on January 12, 2018.

On January 16, 2018, "Egyptian Luvr" was released, the lead single from Rejjie Snow's album Dear Annie which features vocals by Williams and a verse by Aminé. On February 1, Snow's Dear Annie: Part 2 EP was released as a precursor to the full album and included the song "Room 27" which also features vocals by Williams. In addition to these two collaborations, Williams also features on the song "Oh No!" on the full album, which was released on February 16, 2018. In later 2018, she released further singles - "Preach", "Oh No No", "Sunny Day", "Worst In Me", "Miles For You", and "Carried" - a song featured on the OST of the High School Drama movie "The Honor List"

In 2019, Dana released 3 singles "Holiday", "Do No Harm", and "Hard". Each of these songs had an acoustic version released a few weeks after its release.

In 2020, the following singles were released "Silly Words", "Underwater", "Stand By Me (Live Cover)", "Knife", "Stuff", "Answers", "Happy Holidaze", and a cover of "Have Yourself A Merry Little Christmas". Some of the music videos were set up and shot in Dana's own settings due to COVID-19 restrictions. In addition to her singles, Dana also released her third EP on October 30, 2020, titled "Thank You For The Memories" featuring acoustic versions of several of her singles and a cover of Rihanna's "Umbrella". Dana did several online/digital performances this year due to COVID-19 restrictions and lockdowns. One included taking part in H.E.R.'s weekly instagram show "Girls With Guitar" where Dana performed on her guitar and H.E.R. was said to be in awe of Dana's talent. In addition, she featured in a song called "Two Feet" with Young Franco, and Pell. The song was released on September 11, 2020, with a video directed by Ash Lim and Jamin Tasker releasing on November 4, 2020.

On January 13, 2021, Dana released her next single "You Win" with the music video released on January 15, 2021.

To date, Williams has reached over 100 million streams on Spotify.

== Personal life ==
Williams is long-time friends with actress and singer Leighton Meester. The two attended the same middle school. They have performed several cover duets together for Williams's YouTube channel, including "Dreams," "Dream of You," "You and Your Sister," and "Blue Christmas. These cover videos have drawn thousands, and even millions, of viewers.

Williams describes her music as "ethereal soul folk," and is heavily inspired by Fitzgerald, Holiday, Carole King, Norah Jones, Nina Simone, and Sam Cooke. Her greatest thematic inspirations come from events and interactions that happen in her daily life. She has a relaxed approach to songwriting, explaining that "forcing it usually strangles my creative process." Williams finds comfort and release in writing and singing songs about loss, especially surrounding the death of her father.

Williams currently lives and frequently performs in Los Angeles. Williams moved to Los Angeles with her immediate family in 2012 after graduating from school. Williams likes animals and considered being a veterinarian or marine biologist as a child. She often spends time outdoors with her dogs, trying to find new areas of the city to explore.

== Discography ==
=== Extended plays ===
Title	Details
The Lonely One	Release date: March 24, 2014; Label: Independent; Format: Digital download
Let's Fall	Release date: December 11, 2015; Label: Independent; Format: Digital download
Thanks For The Memories	Release date: October 30, 2020; Label: Independent; Format: Digital download
Happy Holidaze	Release date: November 20, 2020; Label: Independent; Format: Digital download

=== Singles ===
Year	Single	Album
2013	"Keep Me Waiting"	The Lonely One
2015	"Fooling Myself"	Let's Fall
2016	"Come Back"	Let's Fall
2017	"No Pressure"	Non-album single
2017	"Honey"	Non-album single
2017	"Drifting"	Non-album single
2017	"Fragile Ego"	Non-album single
2018	"There You Go"	Non-album single
2018	"Preach"	Non-album single
2018	"Oh No No"	Non-album single
2018	"Carried"	From "The Honor list" OST
2018	"Sunny Day"	Non-album single
2018	"Worst In Me	Non-album single
2018	"Miles For You"	Non-album single
2019	"Holiday"	Non-album single
2019	"Holiday (Acoustic)"	Non-album single
2019	"Do No Harm"	Non-album single
2019	"Do No Harm (Acoustic)"	Non-album single
2019	"Hard"	Non-album single
2019	"Hard (Acoustic)"	Non-album single
2020	"Silly Words"	Non-album single
2020	"Underwater"	Non-album single
2020	"Stand By Me (Live Cover)"	Non-album single
2020	"Knife"	Non-album single
2020	"Stuff"	Non-album single
2020	"Answers"	Non-album single
2020	"Happy Holidaze"	Non-album single
2021	"You Win"	Non-album single
2021	"Bad Decisions"	Non-album single
2021	"Red Flag"	Non-album single
2021	"No Doubt"	Non-album single

=== Guest appearances ===
2012	"The Hard"	Freddie Gibbs	Baby Face Killa
2015	"Diamonds"	Freddie Gibbs	Pronto
2015	"Callaway"	Swim Good	Non-album single
2015	Title		Album
2015	"McDuck"	Freddie Gibbs	Shadow of a Doubt
2016	"Sunroof"	Boogie	Thirst 48 Pt. 2
2016	"Nigga Needs" (uncredited)	Boogie	Thirst 48 Pt. 2
2016	"Give Me Your Love"	Gaia & Luna; DJ B3LFAST	Non-album single
2017	"Lifeline"	Melvv	Non-album single
2017	"Pink Flower"	Rejjie Snow; Julian Bell	The Moon and You
2017	"Give Me a Sign"	Fakear	Karmaprana
2017	"Make It Right"	Midnight Snacks	Non-album single
2018	"Egyptian Luvr"	Rejjie Snow; Aminé	Dear Annie
2018	"Room 27"	Rejjie Snow	Dear Annie
2018	"Oh No!"	Rejjie Snow	Dear Annie
2019	"Stay"	The Aston Shuffle	Non-album single
2020	"Two Feet"	Young Franco; Pell	Non-album single
2021	"Waiting For The Rain"	AKA Block	Non-album single
2021	"Weekend Love"	Jafunk; Mike Nasa	Non-album single
2021	"Get Away"	Fabich	Non-album single
2021	"You Got Me"	Jafunk; Nic Hanson	Non-album single
2024	“The More That I Think About It	Alex Aiono	Non-album single

== Videography ==
=== Music videos ===
Year	Video	Director	Ref
2013	"Keep Me Waiting"	Jones Crow	
2014	"Right Now"	Carl Diebold	
2014	"One More"	Caleb Wood	
2015	"Fooling Myself"	Tony Minas	
2016	"Come Back"	Naomi Christie	
2016	"Damage"	Naomi Christie	
2017	"No Pressure"	Christina Holmes; Eric Bumatay	
2017	"Honey"	Rhedd Morton Jankle	
2017	"Drifting"	Jordan Rebello	
2017	"Fragile Ego"	Jordan Rebello	
2018	"There You Go"	Jordan Rebello	
2018	"Preach"	Rhedd Morton Jankle	
2018	" Oh No No"	Rhedd Morton Jankle	
2018	"Sunny Day"	Rhedd Morton Jankle	
2018	"Worst In Me"	Rhedd Morton Jankle	
2019	"Holiday"	N/A	
2019	"Holiday (Acoustic)"	N/A	
2019	"Do No Harm (Acoustic)"	N/A	
2020	"Hard (Acoustic)"	Royce Isaac	
2020	"Underwater"	N/A	
2020	"Knife"	N/A	
2020	"Stuff"	Royce Isaac	
2020	"Answers"	Royce Isaac	
2020	"Have Yourself A Merry Little Christmas"	N/A	
2021	"You Win"	Sebastien Nuta	
2021	"Bad Decisions"	N/A	

=== Featured videos ===
Year	Video	Director	Ref
2012	"The Hard"	N/A	
2017	"Sunroof"	Riley Keough	
2018	"Egyptian Luvr (LA Sessions)"	Alima Lee	
2018	"Egyptian Luvr"	Martin C. Pariseau	
2020	"Two Feet"	Ash Lim Jamin Tasker	
