= Currensy & the Alchemist =

American hip hop duo

- Origin: New Orleans, Louisiana, U.S. Beverly Hills, California, U.S.
- Genre: Hip hop
- Years active: 2011–present
- Labels: Jet Life; ALC
- Members: Currensy; The Alchemist

Currensy & the Alchemist are an American hip hop duo, composed of New Orleans, Louisiana rapper Currensy and Beverly Hills, California producer The Alchemist.

In 2011, Currensy and the Alchemist released their first mixtape Covert Coup.

On January 13, 2016, the duo announced their second mixtape, titled The Carrollton Heist. The mixtape was all recorded in one day, January 4, 2016. Later, Currensy announced a release date and cover art on his Instagram. The release date was set to February 14, 2016. This second mixtape was very long-awaited since rumors of a Covert Coup sequel were floating online back in 2012 until the Alchemist dismissed them in an interview. The mixtape was, indeed released on February 14, on DatPiff. Later, the Alchemist noticed that the version there was not the final mastered one, so he uploaded the full mastered version to his SoundCloud page.

Fetti, a collaborative EP with Freddie Gibbs, was first announced on January 4, 2017, through an Instagram post by Currensy.

On September 21, 2018, nearly two years later, Currensy announced on Instagram that he had completed his half of the project. In the post, Currensy is recorded saying, "This message is to one Fredrick Gibbs. My half of Fetti is done. All produced by Alchemist." Gibbs would publicly respond to the post shortly after, commenting "N***a. Send It. I'm by the booth." On October 25, the tracklist and release date were posted by Gibbs on Instagram. In an interview with the Grinds TV, Gibbs stated that his half of the album took two days to complete.

== Discography ==
=== Studio albums ===
Title	Album details	Peak chart positions	
Title	Album details	US	US Ind.
Continuance	Released: February 18, 2022; Label: Jet Life, ALC, Empire; Format: CD, LP, digital download, streaming	200	28

=== Extended plays ===
- Fetti (with Freddie Gibbs) (2018)
- Spiral Staircases (with Larry June) (2026)

=== Mixtapes ===
- Covert Coup (2011)
- The Carrollton Heist (2016)
