= The Miseducation of Freddie Gibbs =

Mixtape by Freddie Gibbs
- Released: May 21, 2009
- Genre: Hip hop; gangsta rap
- Length: 74:52
- Label: G.I.B.B.S Inc.
- Producer: Just Blaze, Polow da Don, Tupac Shakur, Stretch, Megahertz, J.R. Rotem, Josh The Goon, Mike Heron, Tycoon, Finger Roll, Devin the Dude, A-Plus, Dr. Dre, Mike Elizondo, Needlz Thayod Ausar

Freddie Gibbs chronology
The Miseducation of Freddie Gibbs - EP (2009)	The Miseducation of Freddie Gibbs (2009)	Midwest gangsta boxframe cadillac muzik (2009)

The Miseducation of Freddie Gibbs is a mixtape by American rapper Freddie Gibbs. It was released as a free digital download on May 21, 2009. Most of the songs on the mixtape, along with Gibbs' follow-up mixtape Midwestgangstaboxframecadillacmuzik, were recorded when he was signed to Interscope Records. The mixtape features Ray Cash, Devin The Dude and Black Flint, as guest appearances. While at Interscope, Gibbs had opportunities to work with high-profile producers like Just Blaze, Polow da Don, and The Alchemist, who, with Gibbs, would later end up releasing the collaboration albums Alfredo and Alfredo 2.

The title is a play on Lauryn Hill’s debut "The Miseducation of Lauryn Hill", similarly how other mixtapes by Gibbs released in this time reference classic albums, with his next mixtape "Midwestgangstaboxframecadillacmuzik" taking inspiration from OutKast's "Southernplayalisticadillacmuzik", his compilation "The Labels Tryin’ to Kill Me!" paying homage to "The Ghettos Tryin’ to Kill Me!" by Master P and "Str8 Killa No Filla" which pays homage to the album Equal Rights by Peter Tosh.

== Critical reception ==
The Miseducation of Freddie Gibbs was received favorably by critics. In Pitchfork, Tom Breihan gave it 7.8 out of 10 and described it having "identifiable sound".

== EP ==
An EP composed of the songs from the mixtape which were approved to be sold commercially was released for iTunes on 19 May 2009.

== Track listing ==
Credits adapted from DatPiff.

No.	Title	Producer(s)	Length
1.	"G.I. Pride"	Just Blaze	4:59
2.	"What It Be Like"	Polow da Don	3:52
3.	"From Tha G"	Tupac Shakur, Stretch	4:38
4.	"Keep It Pimpin" (featuring Ray Cash)	Megahertz	3:27
5.	"Neverending Cycle"	J.R. Rotem	4:30
6.	"Queen (Luv U 2 Death)"	Josh The Goon	3:08
7.	"Flamboyant"	Mike Heron	3:02
8.	"Close Your Eyes"	Tycoon	4:21
9.	"In My Hood"	J.R. Rotem	4:37
10.	"Summa Dis"	FingerRoll	3:49
11.	"Stray" (featuring Devin The Dude)	Devin the Dude	4:40
12.	"How We Do ('93 Til)"	A-Plus	4:00
13.	"Goodies" (featuring Black Flint)	Josh the Goon	3:07
14.	"4 Da Streets"	Dr. Dre, Mike Elizondo	3:22
15.	"It's About To Be A Murder"	Needlz	3:52
16.	"World So Cold"	Thayod Ausar	3:55
Total length:			74:52

The Miseducation of Freddie Gibbs - EP - iTunes issue.

All tracks are written by Freddie Gibbs.

No.	Title	Producer	Length
1.	"Queen"	Josh The Goon	3:19
2.	"Goodies"	Josh The Goon	4:07
3.	"Summa Dis"	FingerRoll	4:21
Total length:			11:47

Notes

- "From Tha G" uses the beat from the song "Bury Me A G" by 2Pac and Thug Life.
- "Flamboyant" uses the beat from the song of the same name by Big L.
- "How We Do ('93 Til)" uses the beat from the song of the same name by Souls of Mischief.
- "4 Da Streets" uses the beat from the song "Like Father Like Son" by The Game.
- "World So Cold" uses the beat from the song "Paparazzi" by Xzibit.
- Songs from the EP contain "Big Time Watts" skits.
