= You Only Die 1nce =

Studio album by Freddie Gibbs
- Released: November 1, 2024
- Recorded: 2024
- Genre: Hip-hop
- Length: 37:12
- Labels: ESGN; AWAL
- Producers: Pops; Lambo; 454; K Notes; Bnyx; DJ Harrison; YG! Beats; Walbrook Santana; Thurst Mgurst; Mischa Chillak; Sid "Speakerbomb" Smith

Freddie Gibbs chronology
Soul Sold Separately (2022)	You Only Die 1nce (2024)	Alfredo 2 (2025)

You Only Die 1nce ratings
Review scores
Source	Rating
AllMusic	3.5/5 stars
Clash	7/10

You Only Die 1nce is the fifth solo studio album by American rapper Freddie Gibbs. It was released on November 1, 2024, through AWAL and ESGN. A surprise release with little prior announcement, it serves as a sequel to You Only Live 2wice (2017) and follows his 2022 album Soul Sold Separately. Production was handled by various producers, including Bnyx, DJ Harrison, Andrew "Pops" Papaleo, and 454, among others.

== Background and promotion ==
On October 24, 2024, cryptic billboards around Los Angeles, California emerged with a picture of Freddy Krueger's eyes with the title "Freddie's Back" above, along with the phone number (320) 244-5268. The audio of the phone number was used with Krueger's voice, containing references to Gibbs' previous material including Piñata, You Only Live 2wice, and Soul Sold Separately. On an Instagram account created to promote the album, an animation of Gibbs' cartoon rabbit in a Jason Voorhees mask was posted.

"On the Set" was released on Halloween day–October 31, 2024–as the album's only single; its release was also announced to be happening at midnight.

== Release and reception ==
Being a surprise release with minimal announcement, it was released on November 1, 2024, to streaming, digital download, and CD. A hoodie and t-shirt was also available in promotion of the album.

Clash Music awarded the album a 7/10, saying the album "seems to sum up where the rapper finds himself – out there in the trenches, caught between two sides, working out his own peculiar place in the world."

== Track listing ==
You Only Die 1nce track listing
No.	Title	Writer(s)	Producer(s)	Length
1.	"Status"	Freddie Gibbs; Andrew Papaleo; Kyle Smith	Pops; K Notes; Sid "Speakerbomb" Smith	2:18
2.	"Cosmo Freestyle"	Gibbs; Papaleo; Ben Lambert; DJ Harrison	Pops; Lambo; DJ Harrison	3:04
3.	"Wolverine"	Gibbs; Papaleo; 454; Brian Massaka	454; Pops; Moo Latte	2:47
4.	"Brick Fees"	Gibbs; Papaleo; Walbrook Santana; YG! Beats	YG! Beats; Walbrook Santana; Pops	4:02
5.	"Rabbit Island"	Gibbs; Papaleo; Lambert	Pops; Lambo	2:56
6.	"It's Your Anniversary^{[a]}"	Gibbs; Lambert; Thurst Mgurst	Thurst Mgurst	2:19
7.	"Nobody Like You" (interlude)	Papaleo; Mischa Chillak; Norva Denton	Pops; Mischa Chillak	1:45
8.	"30 Girlfriends (Yeah Yeah)"	Gibbs; Papaleo; Massaka	Pops; Moo Latte	2:59
9.	"Steel Doors"	Gibbs; Papaleo; Massaka; Benjamin Saint-Fort	Bnyx; Pops; Moo Latte	2:54
10.	"Walk It Off"	Gibbs; 454	454	2:32
11.	"Ruthless"	Gibbs; Papaleo; Lambert	Pops; Lambo	2:32
12.	"Origami"	Gibbs; Saint-Fort	Bnyx	3:23
13.	"On the Set"	Gibbs; Papaleo; Lambert; Chillak; RichGains	Pops; Mischa Chillak	3:38
Total length:				37:12

Notes

- ^{^[a]} "It's Your Anniversary" was removed from streaming and later pressings of physical copies due to sample clearance issues.

== Charts ==
Chart performance for You Only Die 1nce
Chart (2024)	Peak position
US Billboard 200	105
US Independent Albums (Billboard)	16
US Top R&B/Hip-Hop Albums (Billboard)	41
