= Alfredo 2 =

2025 studio album by Freddie Gibbs and the Alchemist

Studio album by Freddie Gibbs and the Alchemist
- Released: July 25, 2025
- Studios: Shangri-La, Malibu; Mount Kane; ALC Studios
- Genres: Hip-hop; jazz rap; gangsta rap
- Length: 47:44
- Labels: ESGN; ALC; Virgin Music Group
- Producer: The Alchemist

Freddie Gibbs chronology
| You Only Die 1nce (2024) | Alfredo 2 (2025) |

The Alchemist chronology
| Life is Beautiful (2025) | Alfredo 2 (2025) | Goldfish (2025) |

Freddie Gibbs and the Alchemist chronology
| Alfredo (2020) | Alfredo 2 (2025) |

Singles from Alfredo 2
- 1. "1995" Released: July 17, 2025

Alfredo 2 is the second collaborative studio album by American rapper Freddie Gibbs and American hip-hop producer the Alchemist. It was released on July 25, 2025, through Gibbs's own record label ESGN Records, as well as ALC Records, being distributed by Virgin Music Group. The album serves as a sequel to Gibbs and the Alchemist's 2020 Grammy-nominated album Alfredo, making it their second project as a duo and third overall collaborative album with each other, counting 2018's Fetti with rapper Currensy. The album features guest appearances from Anderson .Paak, Larry June, and JID, and is divided into three acts.

Promoting the album, the duo starred in a short film located in Japan, released the lead single "1995", two music videos, limited-edition vinyl records, a video game, and went on a North American and European tour. The album received critical acclaim from music critics, praising the album's production and duo's chemistry, while a few noted it to be inferior to its predecessor. Commercially, Alfredo 2 debuted at number 13 on the Billboard 200, number 6 on the Top R&B/Hip-Hop Albums chart, and topping the Independent Albums chart, alongside charts from various countries.

== Background ==
In May 2020, The Alchemist and Gibbs released the album Alfredo, which was their first project between only each other, following the album Fetti with fellow rapper Currensy in 2018. The album would later be nominated for Best Rap Album at the 2021 Grammy Awards. Following Alfredo and preceding its sequel, they collaborated on "Fake Flowers" with Currensy on Boldy James' Bo Jackson (2021), "Blackest in the Room" on Gibbs' solo studio album Soul Sold Separately (2022), and the remix to "Ferraris in the Rain" with Schoolboy Q (2024). During that time, Gibbs solely released his studio albums Soul Sold Separately (2022) and You Only Die 1nce (2024).

== Music and lyrics ==
=== Overview ===
Alfredo 2 is a hip-hop album that features guest appearances from JID, Larry June, and Anderson .Paak. It is nearly 48 minutes long and contains fourteen tracks, considered longer than its predecessor. John Wohlmacher of Beats Per Minute compares both albums, considering Alfredo 2 to be more accessible and sonically lighter than its predecessor, with the Alchemist sampling "jazzy fusion textures" released from the late-1960s to the mid-1970s. The album is divided into three acts. Majority of the album was recorded at Shangri-La Studios in Malibu, California, as well as Gibbs' studio (Mount Kane) and the Alchemist's studio (ALC Studios).

=== Tracks: 1–7 ===
"1995"
A 28-second sample of "1995", notable for its guitar riff and introspective lyrics.

Beginning Act I, the opening track and lead single, "1995", is a direct sequel to "1985" from Alfredo, containing an atmosphere of sparkling keys, pillowy pianos, and spacey guitar licks", with Gibbs rapping about his lowest points in life and how he's overcome them, as the Alchemist's guitar riff highlights in the background. The second track, "Mar-a-Lago", samples dialogue from the 2001 hood film Baby Boy, as Gibbs raps about anticipating a federal raid on his property. He later raps over a psychedelic beat on the third track, "Lemon Pepper Steppers". The fourth track, "Ensalada", primarily features Anderson .Paak on the chorus under a soulful hook with a laid guitar backdrop.

The fifth track, "Empandas", shows the Alchemist's bassline blending with Gibbs' sense of humor like a "fluid conversation". He references a 2022 incident where Gibbs was attacked at Dinosaur Bar-B-Que in Buffalo while taking shots at rappers Benny the Butcher and Jim Jones. The sixth track, "Skinny Suge II", starts Act II with an "eerie 80s-noir vibe" and interpolates the opening lines from Ice-T's 1988 song "Colors", as if Gibbs channels the "nightmare walking, psychopath talking" under a high-pitched scream and "heavy knocks of reverberating bass". On the seventh track, "Feeling", Larry June assists in his delivery from flashing to logistics, contrasting Gibbs' past-faced delivery on the track over a "syrupy piano-driven production".

=== Tracks: 8–14 ===
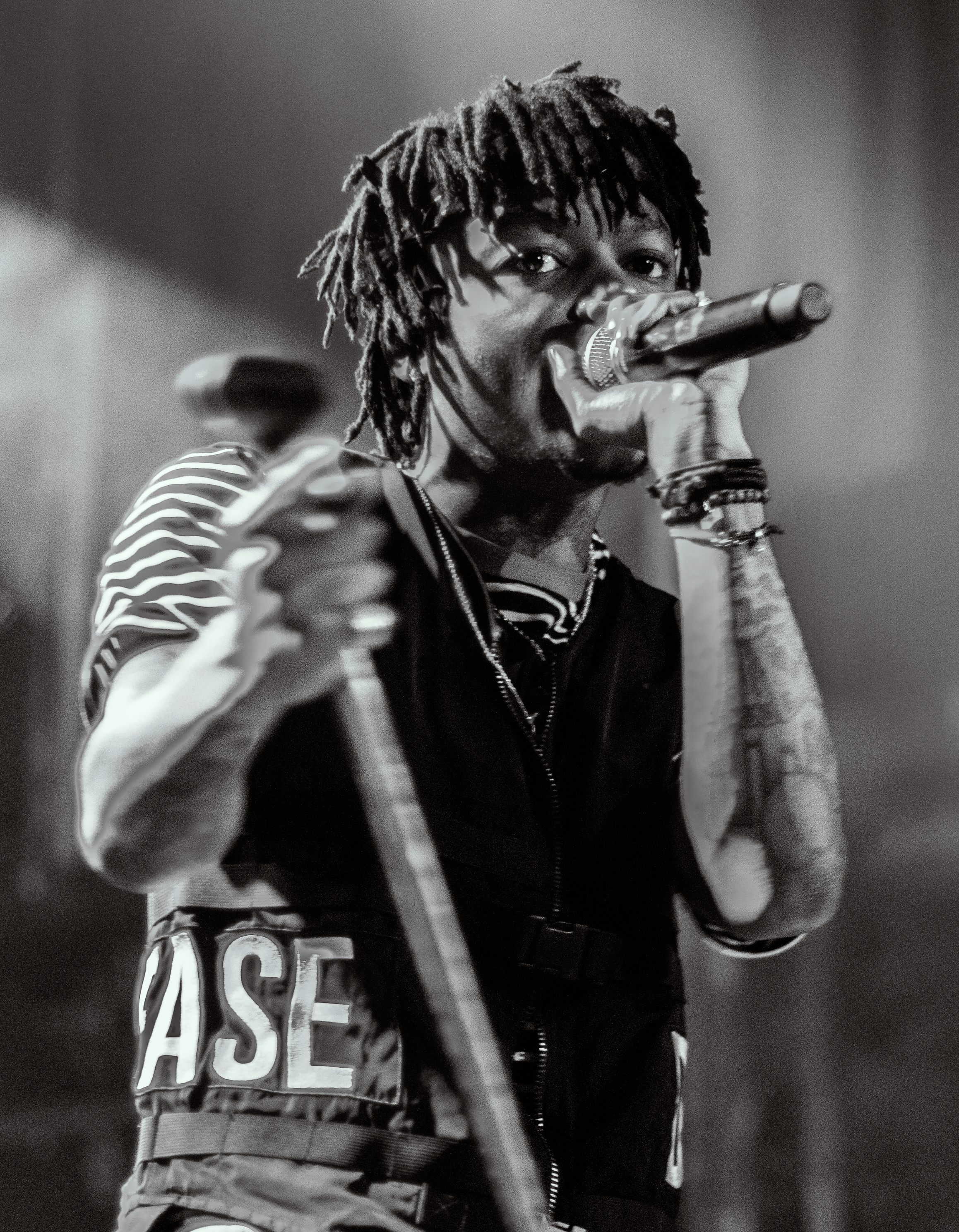
JID's verse from "Gold Feet" was praised by multiple critics, who considered it to outshine Gibbs' verse on the track.

The Alchemist's production brings a lighter approach with the eighth track, "I Still Love H.E.R.", exploring boom bap and following the tradition of rappers writing "love letters" about their relationships, taking inspiration from Common's 1994 song "I Used to Love H.E.R." and The Roots' 1999 song "Act Two (The Love of My Life)". The ninth track, "Shangri La", creates a "millennial R&B-rap sound", as Gibbs shows a breathless flow with several rhymed syllables into each bar. Bringing a retrofuturistic vibe, in the tenth track, "Gas Station Sushi", Gibbs creates an extended pun from narcotics sales, takes aim at New Orleans rapper Currensy, and shows vulnerability over his regrets and still grieving the loss of rapper Mac Miller, concluding Act II.

On the eleventh track, "Lavish Habits", Gibbs raps about his propensity for a luxurious lifestyle mixed with paranoia about the disadvantages of being black and successful. He takes aim at Gunna, DJ Akademiks, and Diddy, before following up with themes of mortality while referencing Nipsey Hussle, Takeoff, and Young Dolph. The twelfth track, "Gold Feet", with sprawling piano notes, features a verse from JID. The thirteenth track, "Jean Claude", shows the Alchemist experimenting with avant-funk as Gibbs reflects on the "in and out" motions of the rap game to his relationships and crew, referencing the 1988 martial arts film Bloodsport and asserting his confidence. The fourteenth and closing track, "A Thousand Mountains", considered the most cinematic of the album, highlights Gibbs' vow to be known as the "black Bruce Wayne" on a beat spaced with flute notes, woodwind samples, and "moody piano keys" akin to a Japanese crime-drama film.

== Promotion and release ==
A pre-save link of the album's sequel and its album cover surfaced online on June 24, 2025, to which many media outlets reported on, but later appeared as a 404 error. The album cover represents a bowl of ramen designed by comic book artist Mike del Mundo. On July 15, cryptic billboards were seen around Los Angeles, showing a phone number that would lead to a voicemail message of a Japanese-speaking woman, asking for a top chef who doesn't fold under pressure. Tabloid website TMZ traced the number to a series of Craigslist ads touting Gibbs and The Alchemist as "American restaurateurs coming together to open their first restaurant in Tokyo".

Alternate album artwork for Alfredo 2

On July 15, 2025, the album's short film Alfredo: The Movie was announced with a screening to be held in Los Angeles the following day, on which the trailer was also released. First screened at Brain Dead Studio in Los Angeles the day prior, the 14-minute short film was released on July 17, alongside the album's lead single "1995", physical preorders, track list, and release date announcement. A yakuza and Ghost Dog-esque film directed by Nick Walker and filmed in Japan, the Alchemist convinces a reclusive Gibbs to return to Tokyo in the mountains, both starring as partners in a stylized version of the city's criminal underground. The duo enjoyed making the short film that Gibbs doesn't want to release an album again without accompanying a short film.

The duo also announced their Amazon-exclusive release of 100 signed LPs, and partnered with streetwear label Babylon for an Amazon Music-sponsored event that took place on July 19, involving a photo exhibition, album preview, short film screening, and limited capsule, which took place at HVW8 Gallery. On July 21, during a live event, the duo previewed "Gold Feet" featuring JID. Just a day before the album's release, the duo released the music video to "1995". On July 25, Alfredo 2 was released by ESGN, ALC, and Virgin Music Group to streaming services and physical release, including LPs, CDs, and cassettes.

Further promoting the album, the duo released a music video to "A Thousand Mountains" on July 31, a short video game titled Alfredo 2: Arcade the following day, and announced their 2025 tour in support of the album under the name Alfredo: The Tour on August 5. The tour began on September 20, in Philadelphia and concluded on November 9, in San Francisco, with Jalen Ngonda, Mavi, and Sven Wunder supporting as openers. On December 8, Gibbs announced a European tour, which began on March 30, in Tilburg, Netherlands and concluded on April 17, in Athens, Greece.

== Critical reception ==
Professional ratings
Aggregate scores
| Source | Rating |
|---|---|
| Metacritic | 82/100 |
Review scores
| Source | Rating |
| AllMusic | 3.5/5 stars |
| Beats Per Minute | 85% |
| Clash | 8/10 |
| Consequence | B |
| The Needle Drop | 7/10 |
| Pitchfork | 7.3/10 |
| RapReviews | 9/10 |

Alfredo 2 was met with critical acclaim. According to the review aggregator Metacritic, Alfredo 2 received "universal acclaim" based on a weighted average score of 82 out of 100 from 7 critic scores. Robin Murray of Clash praised the album, calling it a "brilliant return that matches the magic of the original," noting its "incredible depth" and describing it as a "platform of excellence". Sy Shackleford of RapReviews gave the album a positive review, praising its "narcotic swagger" and comparing its atmosphere to a Japanese crime drama. John Wohlmacher of Beats Per Minute described Alfredo 2 as "just as vibrant, innovative and exciting as Alfredo was five years ago," and argues that it is more diverse, coherent, and well-thought-out than its predecessor.

Paul Thompson of Pitchfork praised Gibbs' animated delivery and "formalist" technique, writing that "Alfredo 2, by its nature, will not transform anyone's understanding of Gibbs or Alchemist, but it will likely prove commercially significant for both." Aron A. of HotNewHipHop described the album as reasserting Gibbs' recalibration rather than his retreat from leaving hip-hop together. Anthony Fantano of The Needle Drop rated the album a "decent to strong 7", having enjoyed it, but noted it could've had more focus. Kiana Fitzgerald of Consequence described Alfredo 2 as a "succulent" but "less filling" sequel, writing: "Sonically and lyrically, Alfredo 2 still has plenty to chew through, and it reflects a partnership that continues to reap the benefits of its collective power." Andy Kellman of AllMusic described the album as "couple shades darker" than its predecessor, describing Gibbs' rapping as "freighted with a sense of looming mortality and inescapable drudgery". He praised the album's guest performances as well as Gibbs' own, writing, "For all his weariness, Gibbs remains compelling and cogent".

== Commercial success ==
Alfredo 2 debuted at number 13 on the Billboard 200 with 37,000 album-equivalent units sold in its first week, surpassing 6,000 units achieved by its predecessor. 14,000 units consisted of physical sales. It also debuted at number six on the US Top R&B/Hip-Hop Albums chart and topped the US Independent Albums chart. In the United Kingdom, the album debuted at number 28 on the UK Albums chart, number six on the UK Independent Albums chart, and topped the UK R&B Albums chart. In Australia, the album debuted at number 44 on the ARIA Charts and number six on the Australian Hip Hop/R&B Albums chart. Elsewhere, the album charted at the top 20 in Germany, Scotland, the Netherlands, Switzerland, and New Zealand, and also charted in Belgium, Denmark, Portugal, Canada, Ireland, France, Lithuania, and Norway.

== Track listing ==
All tracks are written by Fredrick Tipton and Alan Maman; additional writers are noted.

| No. | Title | Additional writer | Length |
|---|---|---|---|
| 1. | "1995" | | 4:49 |
| 2. | "Mar-a-Lago" | | 2:59 |
| 3. | "Lemon Pepper Steppers" | | 2:46 |
| 4. | "Ensalada" (featuring Anderson .Paak) | Brandon Paak Anderson | 3:46 |
| 5. | "Empanadas" | | 3:08 |
| 6. | "Skinny Suge II" | | 3:11 |
| 7. | "Feeling" (featuring Larry June) | Leonard Eugene Hendricks III | 3:55 |
| 8. | "I Still Love H.E.R." | | 2:52 |
| 9. | "Shangri La" | | 3:02 |
| 10. | "Gas Station Sushi" | | 3:29 |
| 11. | "Lavish Habits" | | 2:57 |
| 12. | "Gold Feet" (featuring JID) | Destin Choice Route | 3:41 |
| 13. | "Jean Claude" | | 3:04 |
| 14. | "A Thousand Mountains" | | 4:05 |
| Total length: | | | 47:44 |

== Personnel ==
Credits were adapted from Tidal and liner notes.

Technical

- Freddie Gibbs – vocals
- The Alchemist – production
- Anderson .Paak – vocals ("Ensalada")
- Larry June – vocals ("Feeling")
- JID – vocals ("Gold Feet")
- Thurston "Thurst Mgurst" McCrea – recording
- Eddie Sancho – mixing
- Todd Cooper – mixing ("Feeling")
- Joe LaPorta – mastering

Additional personnel

- Matthew Draeger – art direction
- Ben "Lambo" Lambert – creative director, A&R
- Nick Walker – photography
- Mike "Deadly Mike" Del Mundo – illustration

== Charts ==
| Chart (2025) | Peak position |
|---|---|
| Australian Albums (ARIA) | 44 |
| Australian Hip Hop/R&B Albums (ARIA) | 8 |
| Belgian Albums (Ultratop Flanders) | 21 |
| Belgian Albums (Ultratop Wallonia) | 142 |
| Canadian Albums (Billboard) | 49 |
| Danish Albums (Hitlisten) | 31 |
| Dutch Albums (Album Top 100) | 13 |
| French Albums (SNEP) | 77 |
| German Albums (Offizielle Top 100) | 6 |
| Irish Albums (IRMA) | 66 |
| Lithuanian Albums (AGATA) | 80 |
| New Zealand Albums (RMNZ) | 19 |
| Norwegian Albums (IFPI Norge) | 83 |
| Portuguese Albums (AFP) | 31 |
| Scottish Albums (Official Charts) | 10 |
| Swiss Albums (Schweizer Hitparade) | 18 |
| UK Albums (Official Charts) | 28 |
| UK R&B Albums (Official Charts) | 1 |
| UK Independent Albums (Official Charts) | 6 |
| US Billboard 200 | 13 |
| US Independent Albums (Billboard) | 1 |
| US Top R&B/Hip-Hop Albums (Billboard) | 6 |
