= Freddie (album) =

Mixtape by Freddie Gibbs
- Released: June 22, 2018
- Studio: Mount Kane; D.O.T.S.
- Genre: Hip hop; R&B
- Length: 25:01
- Label: ESGN; Empire
- Producer: Freddie Gibbs (exec.); Ben "Lambo" Lambert (also exec.); A. Lau; Dupri; Enstrumentals; Freddie Kane; Kenny Beats; RichGains; Jones; Skinny; Tony Seltzer

Freddie Gibbs chronology
You Only Live 2wice (2017)	Freddie (2018)	Fetti (2018)

Freddie is the debut commercial mixtape by American rapper Freddie Gibbs. It was released on June 22, 2018, through ESGN and Empire Distribution. The album features guest appearances from Gibbs' daughter Irie Jane Gibbs, alongside 03 Greedo and Cassie Jo Craig. It also includes production from Gibbs himself, credited as Freddie Kane, alongside Kenny Beats, Jones, A. Lau, RichGains and Tony Seltzer, among others.

It succeeds the release of Gibbs' third studio album, You Only Live 2wice (2017).

== Background ==
Hours before the album's release, Freddie Gibbs released an infomercial-style promo as a teaser for the album.

== Artwork ==
The album's artwork features Gibbs donning a beige suit with a pink backdrop. The title and artwork of the album is inspired by Teddy Pendergrass' 1979 album Teddy.

== Critical reception ==
Professional ratings
Aggregate scores
Source	Rating
Metacritic	84/100
Review scores
Source	Rating
AllMusic	3/5 stars
Exclaim!	9/10
HipHopDX	4.3/5
HotNewHipHop	90%
Pitchfork	7.8/10
OOTM	80/100

Freddie received widespread acclaim from critics. At Metacritic, which assigns a normalized rating out of 100 to reviews from mainstream publications, the album received an average score of 84.

Riley Wallace of HipHopDX praised the album, stating Gibbs has "enough fire here to remind fans that he’s able to compete in an era that has continuously boats of some insane releases." Wallace also commented that "the 10-song effort delivers an experience that fans of Gangsta Gibbs have come to expect after the last two projects: glimmering gems scattered among a curated blend of believable, high-quality gangsterism." Meaghan Garvey of Pitchfork wrote that Freddie "feels like a pure and reckless purge from Gibbs, a collection that finds him at his wildest and most essential."

Critic A. Harmony of Exclaim! called Freddie "trolling-as-marketing done right: Gibbs juxtaposes the silky, colourful imagery of vintage R&B with crude beats and tight, blissfully vulgar verses that demand to be replayed at ignorant levels." Online hip hop publication HotNewHipHop concluded that Freddie is Gibbs' "most sublime work yet; by opening with the plight of his youth and concluding with the sampled whispers of his three-year-old daughter, Freddie Gibbs manages to present a more vivid glimpse into the soul of his art than any other major rap artist this past month." In the review for AllMusic, Paul Simpon called the album "a focused set of trap-influenced tracks, showcasing Gibbs' flow at its most energized."

== Track listing ==
Credits adapted from Freddie Gibbs' official Instagram.

No.	Title	Producer(s)	Length
1.	"Weight"	Jones; Skinny; Dupri; RichGains	2:48
2.	"Automatic"	Kenny Beats	2:32
3.	"Death Row" (featuring 03 Greedo)	Kenny Beats; Freddie Kane	2:23
4.	"Triple Threat"	Dupri; RichGains; Enstrumentals	2:58
5.	"2 Legit"	Jones RichGains	2:28
6.	"FLFM (Interlude)"	RichGains; Freddie Kane	1:30
7.	"Set Set"	Kenny Beats	2:29
8.	"Toe Tag"	Kenny Beats	2:13
9.	"FBC"	Kenny Beats; A. Lau; Tony Seltzer	2:04
10.	"Diamonds 2" (featuring Cassie Jo Craig and Irie Jane Gibbs)	Dupri; RichGains	3:36
Total length:			25:01

== Personnel ==
Credits adapted from Freddie Gibbs' official Instagram.

Technical

- Kenny Beats – recording, mixing
- RichGains – recording
- Sid "Speakerbomb" Miller – recording
- Eric "Enstrumentals" Sandoval – recording
- TJ Jacobs – mastering

Additional personnel

- Ben "Lambo" Lambert – creative direction, A&R
- RichGains – A&R
- Nima Etminan – project management (Empire)
- Eamon Mulligan – project management (Empire)
- Scottie Cameron – photography
- Vlad Sepetov – art, graphic design

== Charts ==
Chart (2018)	Peak position
New Zealand Heatseeker Albums (RMNZ)	7
US Billboard 200	142
US Independent Albums (Billboard)	16
