= Lenox Lounge =

Coordinates: 40°48′26.2″N 73°56′43.8″W

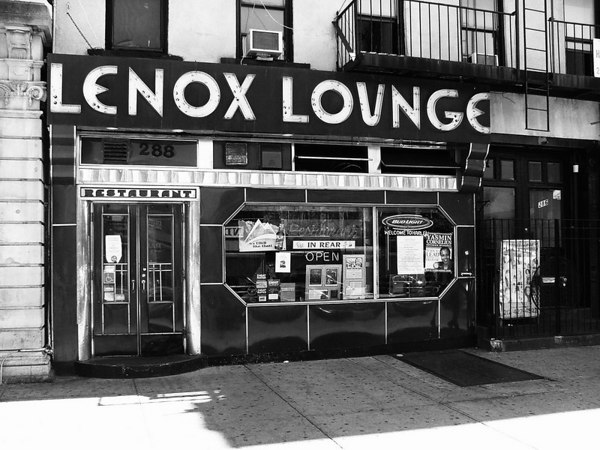
The Lenox Lounge

Lenox Lounge was a long-standing bar in Harlem, New York City. It was located in 288 Lenox Avenue, between 124th and 125th. The bar was founded in 1939 by Ralph Greco and served as a venue for performances by many great jazz artists, including Billie Holiday, Miles Davis, and John Coltrane. Hip Hop rapper Big L was often seen at this particular bar along with other members of the NFL Crew. Harlem Renaissance writers James Baldwin and Langston Hughes were both patrons, as was Malcolm X. Madonna's music video for her song "Secret" was also filmed at the Lenox Lounge.

The bar deteriorated through the middle of the 20th century. Alvin Reid, Sr. purchased it in 1988 and restored the original Art Deco interior from September 1999 to March 2000, during the only closure in the bar's history.

The Lenox Lounge was voted "Best of the Best" by the 2002 Zagat Survey Nightlife Guide and by the 2001 New York Magazine.

In 2012, a rent increase threatened to shutter the establishment. In December 2012, it was announced that it would close at the end of the year. However in January 2013 Reid said he was reopening at 333 Lenox Avenue and that it would have its iconic neon sign there. Richard Notar, who owned the Nobu Restaurant chain and who took over the lease on the original 288 Lenox location, said he would maintain the decor of the original 288 lounge which does not yet have a name. In May 2017 the building was demolished.

The Zebra Room was used for a key scene in the Mad Men pilot, "Smoke Gets In Your Eyes".
