= Shadow of a Doubt (album) =

Studio album by Freddie Gibbs
- Released: November 20, 2015
- Recorded: 2015
- Genre: Hip hop
- Length: 60:05
- Labels: ESGN; Empire
- Producers: Freddie Gibbs (exec.); Lambo (exec.); Speakerbomb (exec.); Akeel Henry; Bentley Haze; Boi-1da; Blair Norf; Frank Dukes; J Reid; Kaytranada; Murda Beatz; Mike Dean; Mikhail; Pops; Superville; Superdriiv; Sledgren; Tarentino

Freddie Gibbs chronology
Pronto EP (2014)	Shadow of a Doubt (2015)	You Only Live 2wice (2017)

Shadow of a Doubt is the second studio album by American rapper Freddie Gibbs. It was released on November 20, 2015, by ESGN and Empire Distribution.

== Critical reception ==
Professional ratings
Aggregate scores
Source	Rating
Metacritic	78/100
Review scores
Source	Rating
Consequence of Sound	B
Exclaim!	8/10
The Guardian	4/5 stars
HipHopDX	4/5 stars
NME	4/5
Pitchfork Media	7.8/10
PopMatters	7/10 stars

Shadow of a Doubt received positive reviews from music critics. At Metacritic, which assigns a normalized rating out of 100 to reviews from mainstream critics, the album received an average score of 78, based on 12 reviews, which indicates "generally favorable reviews". Michael Madden of Consequence said, "Even with all its different sounds, Shadow of a Doubt leaves one clear impression: Freddie Gibbs is a restless artist who continues to find meaning in his Gary story and beyond, knowing that the details can prepare him for whatever comes next." Keith Nelson Jr. of HipHopDX said, "When he ends the album with "Cold Ass Nigga", the most demonstrably aggressive verse on the album, you realize Shadow of a Doubt isn't Gibbs flipping to go pop, but a man secure enough in the foundation he has laid to take a leap of faith." Max Mertens of Pitchfork stated "While the final result is less cohesive, and could benefit from trimming two or three songs, there's no denying Gibbs' versatility."

== Track listing ==
No.	Title	Writer(s)	Producer(s)	Length
1.	"Rearview"	Fredrick Tipton; Blair Lowery; Sidney Miller	Blair Norf; Speakerbomb^{[a]}	3:57
2.	"Narcos"	Tipton; Lowery; Miller	Blair Norf; Speakerbomb^{[a]}	3:07
3.	"Careless"	Tipton; Andrew Papaleo; Miller	Pops; Superville; Speakerbomb^{[a]}	3:46
4.	"Fuckin' Up the Count"	Tipton; Matthew Samuels; Adam Feeney; Miller	Boi-1da; Frank Dukes; Speakerbomb^{[a]}	3:21
5.	"Extradite" (featuring Black Thought)	Tipton; Tariq Trotter; Miller	Mikhail; Speakerbomb^{[a]}	4:39
6.	"McDuck" (featuring Dana Williams)	Tipton; Dana Williams; Miller	Speakerbomb	3:28
7.	"Mexico" (featuring Tory Lanez)	Tipton; Daystar Peterson; Shane Lindstrom; Miller	Murda Beatz; Speakerbomb^{[a]}	4:12
8.	"Packages" (featuring ManMan Savage)	Tipton; Chance Youngblood; Marcus Bowens; Miller	Tarentino; Speakerbomb^{[a]}	3:48
9.	"10 Times" (featuring Gucci Mane & E-40)	Tipton; Radric Davis; Earl Stevens; Miller	Speakerbomb	3:30
10.	"Lately"	Tipton; Akeel Henry; Miller	Superville; Akeel; Superdriiv; Speakerbomb^{[a]}	3:55
11.	"Basketball Wives"	Tipton; Miller	Bentley Haze; Speakerbomb^{[a]}	4:09
12.	"Forever and a Day"	Tipton; Miller	J Reid; Speakerbomb^{[a]}	4:36
13.	"Insecurities"	Tipton; Louis Celestin; Feeney; Miller	Kaytranada; Frank Dukes; Speakerbomb^{[a]}	4:26
14.	"Freddie Gordy"	Tipton; Lowery; Miller	Blair Norf; Speakerbomb^{[a]}	3:51
15.	"Cold Ass Nigga"	Tipton; Michael Dean	Mike Dean	3:53
Total length:				58:38

Digital release bonus tracks
No.	Title	Writer(s)	Producer(s)	Length
16.	"My Boy"	Tipton; Edward Murray; Miller	Sledgren; Speakerbomb^{[a]}	4:30
17.	"10 Chickens"	Tipton; Papaleo; Miller	Pops; Mikhail; Speakerbomb^{[a]}	2:38
Total length:				65:46

Vinyl release bonus tracks – including Pronto EP
No.	Title	Writer(s)	Producer(s)	Length
16.	"My Boy"	Tipton; Edward Murray; Miller	Sledgren; Speakerbomb^{[a]}	4:30
17.	"10 Chickens"	Tipton; Papaleo; Miller	Pops; Mikhail; Speakerbomb^{[a]}	2:38
18.	"Pronto"		Pops; Mikhail	3:38
19.	"White Range"		Blair Norf	3:58
20.	"Diamonds" (featuring Dana Williams)		Pops	4:15
Total length:				77:37

Notes

- ^{^{^[a]}} signifies a co-producer
- "Lately" and "Basketball Wives" features additional vocals by Duntea Davis
- "Lately" features additional vocals by Paxton "Paxman" Miller
- "10 Times" features additional vocals by Brittany B
- "Insecurities" features additional vocals by River Tiber
- "Diamonds" features additional vocals by 12til

Sample credits

- "Careless" contains a sample of "Amazing", written and performed by George Michael.
- "Fuckin' Up the Count" contains samples of audio from various episodes of The Wire.
- "Extradite" contains a sample of "Nautilus", written and performed by Bob James.
- "Forever and a day" contains a sample of "Tubular Bells, Pt. 1", written and performed by Mike Oldfield.

== Charts ==
Chart (2015)	Peak position
US Billboard 200	76
US Top R&B/Hip-Hop Albums (Billboard)	11
US Independent Albums (Billboard)	4
