= Fetti =

EP by Freddie Gibbs, Currensy & the Alchemist
- Released: October 31, 2018
- Recorded: 2017–18
- Genre: Hip-hop
- Length: 23:37
- Labels: ESGN; Jet Life; ALC; Empire
- Producer: The Alchemist

Freddie Gibbs chronology
| Freddie (2018) | Fetti (2018) | Bandana (2019) |

Currensy & the Alchemist chronology
| The Carrollton Heist (2016) | Fetti (2018) | Continuance (2022) |

Fetti is a collaborative extended play by American rappers Freddie Gibbs, Currensy & the Alchemist. It was released on October 31, 2018, for streaming and digital download by ESGN Records, Jet Life Recordings and ALC Records. Fetti was entirely produced by the Alchemist.

== Background and release ==
Fetti was first announced on January 4, 2017, through an Instagram post by Currensy.

On September 21, 2018, Currensy announced on Instagram that he had completed his half of the project. In the post, Currensy is recorded saying, "This message is to one Fredrick Gibbs. My half of Fetti is done. All produced by Alchemist." Gibbs would publicly respond to the post shortly after, commenting "N***a. send It. I’m by the booth.” On October 25, the tracklist and release date were posted by Gibbs on Instagram. In an interview with The Grinds TV, Gibbs stated that his half of the album took two days to complete.

Within the 19 months following Fetti's initial announcement, Currensy released 12 projects while Gibbs released You Only Live 2wice and Freddie, his third and fourth studio albums.

In 2015, Gibbs and Currensy recorded a track titled "Fetti" for Welcome to Los Santos, a studio album produced by the Alchemist and Oh No to be included as a fictional in-game radio station in the Windows version of Grand Theft Auto V. It is not confirmed whether the track had any relation to the conception of the album.

== Critical reception ==
Professional ratings
Aggregate scores
| Source | Rating |
|---|---|
| Metacritic | 86/100 |
Review scores
| Source | Rating |
| Clash | 8/10 |
| Pitchfork | 8.0/10 |

Fetti received acclaim from critics. At Metacritic, the mixtape scored an 86 out of 100 based on four reviews.

In a positive review, Nathan Fisher of Clash praised the chemistry between the rappers, as well as commending the production: "despite the difference in the lyrical content delivered by Currensy and Gibbs, there is an unquestionable musical synergy between the two, and with Currensy and Alchemist already having completed two projects, it would be unsurprising if fans demanded something similar from Alchemist and Gibbs. Before its release, Fetti had the potential to be one of the strongest hip-hop albums of the year due to the skilled people involved and it has no doubt fulfilled that promise." Timmhotep Aku of Pitchfork wrote that Fetti is "a short, sweet, and potent mix, an example of the good that can happen when seasoned vets link up and operate under the radar and outside of the major label system." The production of the album was praised, stating that "The Alchemist is the centerpiece of the whole affair, the unseen ringleader whose presence is felt without him having to speak a word. He employs a production style that’s all about mood; using ’70s soul records to create the soundscape at the nexus of Blaxploitation soundtracks and eerie, ’80s-style synths."

== Track listing ==
All tracks produced by the Alchemist.

Fetti track listing
| No. | Title | Length |
|---|---|---|
| 1. | "Location Remote" | 2:55 |
| 2. | "The Blow" | 2:31 |
| 3. | "New Thangs" | 2:23 |
| 4. | "Saturday Night Special" | 3:28 |
| 5. | "Now & Later Gators" (performed by Freddie Gibbs) | 2:33 |
| 6. | "No Window Tints" (performed by Currensy) | 1:40 |
| 7. | "Willie Lloyd" (performed by Freddie Gibbs) | 2:42 |
| 8. | "Tapatio" | 2:53 |
| 9. | "Bundy & Sincere" | 2:23 |
| Total length: | | 23:37 |

== Personnel ==
Credits adapted from Freddie Gibbs's Twitter account.

- Freddie Gibbs – primary artist
- Currensy – primary artist
- The Alchemist – primary artist, production
- Ann One – additional vocals (track 5)
- DJ J Rocc – cutting (track 1)
- Eddie Sancho – mixing
- Joe LaPorta – mastering
- Rich Gains – engineering
- Young Mexico – horns, keys (track 4)
