= Baby Face Killa =

Mixtape by Freddie Gibbs
- Released: September 25, 2012
- Recorded: 2011–2012
- Genre: Hip hop; gangsta rap
- Length: 70:56
- Producer: M-80; DJ Stikuhbush; Cylla; Feb. 9; SMKA; Cookin' Soul; DJ Dahi; Statik Selektah; The Futuristiks; DJ Fresh; DJ Izzo; Matterafact; T-Minus; DJ Mustard; Bobby Kritical; Lil' Lody; Diamond Style

Freddie Gibbs chronology
Shame (2012)	Baby Face Killa (2012)	ESGN (2013)

Professional ratings
Review scores
Source	Rating
Consequence of Sound	4/5 stars
Pitchfork Media	8.2/10
Pop Matters	7/10

Baby Face Killa is a mixtape by American rapper Freddie Gibbs and DJ and record producer DJ Drama. It was released on September 25, 2012. It is the first installment of the Gangsta Grillz series featuring Gibbs. The mixtape was announced shortly after the release of the previous street album Cold Day In Hell. The mixtape features guest appearances from Pharrell Williams, Dana Williams, Z-Ro, Young Jeezy, Slick Pulla, Ea$y Money, YG, Dom Kennedy, SpaceGhostPurrp, Krayzie Bone, Jadakiss, Jay Rock, Wayne Blazed, Curren$y, Problem, G-Wiz, D-Edge, Hit Skrewface and Kirko Bangz.

The second track "Still Livin'" was featured in the video game Grand Theft Auto V.

The streaming edition removed the DJ tags by DJ Drama and adds two additional songs "Breaking Bad" and "Fuck Them Niggaz" which are replacing songs "The Diet" and "Every City" which are left out of the commercial release of the mixtape.

== Critical reception ==
Baby Face Killa received positive reviews from critics. Michael Madden wrote: "Because he typically drops just one tape a year, Gibbs can’t much afford to jump on anything but crisp, well-mastered beats. Despite its biggest producers being just Statik Selektah and “Rack City”’s DJ Mustard, BFK fulfills any and all requirements in this respect. “Kush Cloud”, for instance, is airy and luxuriant – it could have “& Orange Juice” in the middle of its title – while “Seventeen” is built around rich samples of “It Was a Very Good Year”." in his review for Consequence.

Jonah Bromwich of Pichfork commented that "That's what you're going to get from Freddie Gibbs. There's no excess; the fat's all stripped away and any kind of celebration is a form of catharsis, that beer that you need after a long day after work instead of a gratuitous 10 bottles of Ace of Spades."

David Amidon said that "For the most part, Baby Face Killa is Gibbs’ unabashed assault on car stereos, full of sleek riding music even when he reaches into his darker tendencies like “Stay Down”, which reminisces on his lesser days in Gary, Indiana. I doubt it proves to be a grower like his last drop was, but it’s easily the most accessible project he’s ever put out there and could turn a lot of folks who were on the fence about his harder edges into fans." in his review of PopMatters.

== Track listing ==
No.	Title	Producer(s)	Length
1.	"BFK"	M-80	4:02
2.	"Still Livin'"	DJ Stikuhbush	3:14
3.	"The Diet" (^{†}) (featuring Pharrell Williams)	Cylla	3:32
4.	"Money, Clothes, Hoes (MCH)"	Feb.9	4:35
5.	"The Hard" (featuring Dana Williams)	Feb.9	4:56
6.	"Kush Cloud" (featuring Krayzie Bone and SpaceGhostPurrp)	SMKA	5:05
7.	"Walk In Wit the M.O." (featuring Dom Kennedy)	Cookin' Soul	3:18
8.	"Bout It Bout It" (featuring Kirko Bangz)	DJ Dahi	4:16
9.	"Krazy" (featuring Jadakiss and Jay Rock)	Statik Selektah	3:42
10.	"Stay Down"	DJ Dahi	4:02
11.	"Boxframe Cadillac ('83 DeVille Mix)" (featuring Z-Ro)	The Futuristiks	3:54
12.	"Middle of the Night" (featuring Wayne Blazed)	Diamond Style	3:57
13.	"Go For It" (featuring Young Jeezy)	Bobby Kritical	3:49
14.	"On Me" (featuring Problem)	DJ Fresh	3:35
15.	"Tell A Friend" (featuring Curren$y)	DJ Izzo; Matterafact	3:51
16.	"My Nigga" (featuring G-Wiz, D-Edge and Hit Skrewface)	Cookin' Soul	5:01
17.	"Seventeen" (featuring Young Jeezy and Slick Pulla)	T-Minus	3:55
18.	"Every City" (Bonus track) (^{†}) (featuring YG)	DJ Mustard	2:12
Total length:			70:56

Streaming Version
No.	Title	Producer(s)	Length
17.	"Breaking Bad" (featuring Ea$y Money)	Statik Selektah	4:00
18.	"Fuck Them Niggaz"	Lil’ Lody	3:08
Total length:			73:14

=== Notes ===
- ^† Both tracks "The Diet" are "Every City" are omitted from the reissue due to sample clearance issues.
- "Every City" uses the same beat as 2 Chainz's song "I'm Different".
- In the reissue, normal tracks 4-17 are pushed down one spot. For example, "The Hard" would become track 4 instead of 5, "Seventeen" would become track 16 instead of 17, etc.
