= Alfredo (album) =

2020 studio album by Freddie Gibbs and the Alchemist

Studio album by Freddie Gibbs and the Alchemist
- Released: May 29, 2020
- Genre: Hip-hop
- Length: 35:05
- Labels: ESGN; ALC; Empire
- Producer: The Alchemist

Freddie Gibbs chronology
Bandana (2019)	Alfredo (2020)	Singles EP (2022)

The Alchemist chronology
Lulu (2020)	Alfredo (2020)	Haram (2021)

Freddie Gibbs and the Alchemist chronology
Alfredo (2020)	Alfredo 2 (2025)

Singles from Alfredo
- 1. "1985" Released: May 28, 2020

Alfredo is the first collaborative studio album by American rapper Freddie Gibbs and American hip-hop producer the Alchemist. It was released on May 29, 2020, through Gibbs's own record label ESGN Records, as well as ALC Records and Empire Distribution.

The album is the first project between only Gibbs and the Alchemist, as it also marks the second time they have collaborated on a full-length project, following 2018's Fetti with fellow rapper Currensy. It features guest appearances from fellow rappers Rick Ross, Benny the Butcher, Tyler, the Creator, and Conway the Machine.

Alfredo received widespread acclaim from critics, with many naming the album one of the best albums of 2020. It debuted at number 15 on the Billboard 200, with 30,000 album-equivalent units earned in its first week. The album was later nominated for Best Rap Album at the 2021 Grammy Awards.

A sequel, Alfredo 2, was released five years later on July 25, 2025.

== Background ==
The Alchemist and Gibbs first worked together as early as 2003–2004. However, nothing from that period was released. Their first official collaboration was in April 2011 on the Currensy and Alchemist song "Scottie Pippen", which Gibbs was featured on. In October 2018, the trio released a collaborative album titled Fetti.

== Title and artwork ==
The title is a portmanteau of the Alchemist and Gibbs's names. The album cover, designed by Vlad Sepetov, shows a hand puppeteering a fettuccine Alfredo dish. It draws similarities to the logo of renowned crime film franchise The Godfather.

== Release and promotion ==
On May 27, 2020, Gibbs and the Alchemist announced the release of new music via social media, before confirming the collaborative project shortly after. The announcement came alongside the option for pre-ordering the album in digital and physical format, including a comic book by Mike del Mundo inspired by the album.

The first single, "1985", was released a day before the album, alongside an accompanying music video directed by Nick Walker.

== Critical reception ==
Professional ratings
Aggregate scores
Source	Rating
Metacritic	88/100
Review scores
Source	Rating
AllMusic	4/5 stars
Clash	9/10
Exclaim!	9/10
HipHopDX	4.5/5
The Line of Best Fit	9.5/10
Loud and Quiet	8/10
No Ripcord	8/10
Pitchfork	8.0/10
Q	4/5 stars
Tom Hull – on the Web	B+

Alfredo was met with widespread critical acclaim. At Metacritic, which assigns a normalized rating out of 100 to reviews from professional publications, the album received an average score of 88, based on nine reviews.

Jack Bray of The Line of Best Fit praised the album, stating, "It's an incredibly tight record packed with stellar performances, production and presence throughout. The blood, sweat and tears of hip-hop run through the album, but Gibbs has once again redefined what that means". Josh Svetz from HipHopDX enjoyed the album, saying, "Alfredo is a master class in rap — 35 minutes of cutthroat bars that feel like 15, leaving you hungry for another course. In a world where the basic function of waking up feels like a chore, Freddie Gibbs and Alchemist have served up a dish of quick comfort food packed with essential nutrients included". Reviewing the album for Clash, Robin Murray stated: "Alfredo excels on every front, a record that fuses a thirst for fresh innovation with a depth of love for hip-hop and rap music that is almost unparalleled. Pretty much an instant classic, it's the sound of Freddie Gibbs finally bursting free, working with tour de force production to surge past expectations and claim his place at the absolute pinnacle." Juan Edgardo Rodríguez of No Ripcord gave a positive review, stating, "Gibbs is a masterful curator who knows who to match his flows with, like on God is Perfect and Look at Me, splicing soul loops, movie clips, and inventive beats etched into his gruff vocals. The beats are an attraction in itself, but make no mistake: they wouldn't be as good if Gibbs weren't behind the mic spitting his poetic yet matter-of-fact observations."

Clayton Tomlinson of Exclaim! said, "The current king of rap manages, yet again, to offer a searing insight into his life, past and present. The songs on Alfredo are fun even when the themes aren't." Pitchfork critic Matthew Ismael Ruiz said, "Gibbs skates over these beats, effortlessly gliding in and out of the pocket. Even the moments of stark contrast feel natural." Writing for AllMusic, Andy Kellman felt that "Whether Alchemist transmutes glacial boom-bap and trawling acid nightmares or spiritual soft rock and tear-jerking soul, Gibbs makes it all work to his benefit." Rupert Howe of Q said, "The melodic flow of Alchemist's beats perfectly offsets his partner's raw, unfiltered delivery."

=== Year-end lists ===
Select year-end rankings of Alfredo
Publication	List	Rank	Ref.
Billboard	The 20 Best Rap Albums of 2020	6	
Complex	The Best Albums of 2020	4	
Exclaim!	Exclaim!'s 50 Best Albums of 2020	15	
The Fader	The 50 Best Albums of 2020	15	
The Guardian	The 50 Best Albums of 2020	34	
The New Yorker; (by Amanda Petrusich)	The Best Music of 2020	9	
Pitchfork	The 50 Best Albums of 2020	44	
Spin	The 30 Best Albums of 2020	16	
Stereogum	The 50 Best Albums of 2020	18	
Under the Radar	Under the Radar's Top 100 Albums of 2020	59	

=== Industry awards ===
Awards and nominations for Alfredo
Year	Ceremony	Category	Result	Ref.
2021	Grammy Awards	Best Rap Album	Nominated	

== Commercial performance ==
In the United States, Alfredo debuted at number 15 on the Billboard 200, earning 30,000 album-equivalent units in its first week, making it both Gibbs's and the Alchemist's highest-charting album to date.

== Track listing ==
All tracks produced by the Alchemist.

Alfredo track listing
No.	Title	Writer(s)	Length
1.	"1985"	Fredrick Tipton; Alan Maman	2:32
2.	"God Is Perfect"	Tipton; Maman	3:59
3.	"Scottie Beam" (with Rick Ross)	Tipton; Maman; William Roberts II; Norman Virgil Whiteside	4:04
4.	"Look at Me"	Tipton; Maman	2:33
5.	"Frank Lucas" (featuring Benny the Butcher)	Tipton; Maman; Jeremie Pennick	4:41
6.	"Something to Rap About" (featuring Tyler, the Creator)	Tipton; Maman; Tyler Okonma; David T. Walker	4:42
7.	"Baby Shit"	Tipton; Maman	3:36
8.	"Babies & Fools" (featuring Conway the Machine)	Tipton; Maman; Demond Price	3:26
9.	"Skinny Suge"	Tipton; Maman	2:52
10.	"All Glass"	Tipton; Maman	2:33
Total length:			35:05

Vinyl bonus track
No.	Title	Writer(s)	Length
11.	"Daddy Loves You"	Tipton; Maman	1:18
Total length:			36:23

Notes

- "Baby Shit" is stylized as "Baby $hit"

Sample credits

- "1985" contains a sample of "El Ómnibus", as written and performed by Rubén Rada.
- "Scottie Beam" contains a sample of "Alone (Reprise)", as performed by Wee and written by Norman Virgil Whiteside.
- "Something to Rap About" contains samples from "On Love", as written and performed by David T. Walker.

== Personnel ==
Credits adapted from Freddie Gibbs's social media.

- Ben "Lambo" Lambert – creative direction
- Rich Gains – engineering
- Vlad Sepetov – art direction
- Mike "Deadly Mike" Del Mundo – original illustration
- Eddie Sancho – mixing
- Joe LaPorta – mastering
- Vic Wainstein – additional engineering (track 6)

== Charts ==
Chart performance for Alfredo
Chart (2020)	Peak position
Belgian Albums (Ultratop Flanders)	145
Canadian Albums (Billboard)	76
US Billboard 200	15
US Top R&B/Hip-Hop Albums (Billboard)	12
