= Midwestgangstaboxframecadillacmuzik =

Mixtape by Freddie Gibbs
- Released: August 27, 2009
- Genres: Hip-hop; gangsta rap
- Length: 71:11
- Label: G.I.B.B.S Inc.
- Producers: Cook Classics; J.R. Rotem; Red Spyda; Speakerbomb; Mr. Lee713; D-Edge; FingerRoll; Archibald Bonker; Fresh Chuck Daily; Axis; Polow Da Don; Dj Skee; Dj Paul; Juicy J; Reef; Organized Noize

Freddie Gibbs chronology
The Miseducation of Freddie Gibbs (2009)	Midwestgangstaboxframecadillacmuzik (2009)	Playa - EP (2010)

DJ Skee Presents: Freddie Gibbs - Midwestgangstaboxframecadillacmuzik (also referred to simply as Midwestgangstaboxframecadillacmuzik) is a mixtape by American rapper Freddie Gibbs and DJ and record producer DJ Skee. It was released as a free download on August 27, 2009, shortly after The Miseducation of Freddie Gibbs. The majority of the songs were recorded when Gibbs was signed to Interscope Records. The mixtape features appearances from Devin The Dude, Hayes, Pill, D-Edge and California Pudd. DJ Skee is not present on the streaming edition of the mixtape.

The title is a play on OutKast's "Southernplayalisticadillacmuzik", similarly to how other projects by Gibbs released in this time reference classic albums, with his next previous mixtape "Miseducation Of Freddie Gibbs" taking inspiration from Lauryn Hill’s debut "The Miseducation of Lauryn Hill", his compilation "The Labels Tryin’ to Kill Me!" paying homage to "The Ghettos Tryin’ to Kill Me!" by Master P and "Str8 Killa No Filla" which pays homage to the album Equal Rights by Peter Tosh.

== Critical reception ==
Midwestgangstaboxframecadillacmuzik was received favorably by critics. Pitchfork's Tom Breihan gave it 8.3 out of 10 and described both The Miseducation of Freddie Gibbs and Midwestgangstaboxframecadillacmuzik as "Hard, cohesive long-players with hints of the familiar but not enough to make it sound like cliche" when reviewing both in the same article.

== Track listing ==
Credits adopted from DatPiff.

All tracks are written by Freddie Gibbs unless noted.

No.	Title	Producer(s)	Length
1.	"Midwest Malcolm (Intro)"	Cook Classics	2:35
2.	"Boxframe Cadillac"	J.R. Rotem	3:08
3.	"Sumthin' U Should Know" (featuring Devin The Dude)	Red Spyda	4:32
4.	"For My Niggas" (featuring Hayes)	J.R. Rotem	4:21
5.	"Murda On My Mind"	Speakerbomb	3:04
6.	"Womb 2 The Tomb" (featuring Pill)	Mr. Lee713	4:03
7.	"County Bounce"	Speakerbomb	3:32
8.	"How I Feel" (featuring D-Edge)	D-Edge	4:41
9.	"Talkin' Bout You"	FingerRoll; Archibald Bonkers	3:54
10.	"Still Standing"	Fresh Chuck Daily	3:44
11.	"I'm the Man"	Axis	4:16
12.	"Bussdown"	Polow da Don	3:12
13.	"Playa" (featuring California Pudd)	DJ Skee	4:59
14.	"Iodine Poison"		3:39
15.	"Just Tryin' ta Make It"	DJ Paul; Juicy J	3:35
16.	"One Mo' Time"	Reef	3:09
17.	"Higher Learning"	Organized Noize	7:03
18.	"Smoke Away The Pain"		3:38
Total length:			71:11
