= Covert Coup =

Mixtape by Currensy & the Alchemist
- Released: April 20, 2011
- Recorded: 2011
- Genre: Hip-hop
- Labels: Jet Life; ALC
- Producer: The Alchemist

Currensy & the Alchemist chronology
Covert Coup (2011)	The Carrollton Heist (2016)

Curren$y chronology
Pilot Talk II (2010)	Covert Coup (2011)	Weekend at Burnie's (2011)

Alchemist chronology
Gutter Water (2010)	Covert Coup (2011)	Vodka & Ayahuasca (2012)

Covert Coup is the first mixtape by American duo Currensy & the Alchemist. It was released on April 20, 2011 via Jet Life Recordings and ALC Records. Produced entirely by the Alchemist, it features guest appearances from Fiend, Freddie Gibbs, Prodigy and Smoke DZA.

Composed of ten songs, the mixtape was created as a retail extended play. Later, the artists decided to release it as a free digital mixtape. On April 7, 2011, the first single from Covert Coup titled "Ventilation" was leaked onto the internet. "Full Metal" was leaked on April 12. On April 15, the third single entitled "Scottie Pippen" featuring Freddie Gibbs, was leaked. The mixtape was announced by Currensy on April 20, 2011, via his Twitter. On May 8, 2012, the Alchemist released Covert Coup Instrumentals, a project that includes the instrumental version of every track in the mixtape.

== Critical reception ==
Professional ratings
Aggregate scores
Source	Rating
Metacritic	80/100
Review scores
Source	Rating
Beats Per Minute	80/100%
Cokemachineglow	80/100%
Pitchfork	7.9/10
Rolling Stone	3.5/5 stars
XXL	4/5

Covert Coup was met with generally favorable reviews from music critics. At Metacritic, which assigns a normalized rating out of 100 to reviews from mainstream publications, the album received an average score of 80, based on five reviews.

Chase McMullen of Beats Per Minute praised the project, stating: "this is a damn good 10 track record, boasting noteworthy turns by its guests and laudable production, but for how long will it spin until the next one comes around? Curren$y has finally found the following he deserves; one can only hope he preserves his moment, rather than squander it". Brian Riewer of Cokemachineglow found "Curren$y drops some of the meanest shit he's ever done, giving real credence to his attempt to crawl out of his obvious niche". Neil Martinez-Belkin of XXL wrote: "seven of the ten tracks are under 3 minutes long, leaving the listener wanting more. It's as if you've just begun to take off with the jets, but the pilot is forced to make a premature landing. Even so, CC delivers, it's quality outshining its quantity". Tom Breihan of Pitchfork resumed: "there's plenty of zoned-out atmosphere on the tape, but it's a strong, focused, unified piece of work, not just a lava-lamp soundtrack. It stands on its own". Matthew Trammell of Rolling Stone concluded: "it's the perfect backdrop for the rapper's stoner humor ("Patty cake, patty cake/I'm baked my man") and for quality cameos from the freshly paroled Prodigy and blog darling Freddie Gibbs. Straight edge listeners won't be disappointed, either".

== Track listing ==
No.	Title	Length
1.	"BBS"	2:29
2.	"The Type" (featuring Prodigy)	5:02
3.	"Blood Sweat & Gears" (featuring Fiend)	3:22
4.	"Life Instructions" (featuring Smoke DZA)	2:27
5.	"Smoke Break"	2:30
6.	"Scottie Pippens" (featuring Freddie Gibbs)	3:22
7.	"Ventilation"	2:20
8.	"Double 07"	2:13
9.	"Success Is My Cologne"	2:11
10.	"Full Metal"	2:40

== Personnel ==
- Shante "Curren$y" Franklin – vocals
- Albert "Prodigy" Johnson – vocals (track 2)
- Richard "Fiend" Jones – vocals (track 3)
- Sean "Smoke DZA" Pompey – vocals (track 4)
- Fredrick "Freddie Gibbs" Tipton – vocals (track 6)
- Daniel Alan "The Alchemist" Maman – producer
- Eddie Sancho – mixing
- Brock Korsan – A&R
