= The Carrollton Heist =

Mixtape by Currensy & the Alchemist
- Released: February 14, 2016
- Genre: Hip-hop
- Length: 28:49
- Labels: ALC; Jet Life
- Producer: The Alchemist

Currensy & the Alchemist chronology
Covert Coup (2011)	The Carrollton Heist (2016)	Continuance (2022)

Currensy chronology
The Owners Manual (2016)	The Carrollton Heist (2016)	Weed & Instrumentals (2016)

The Alchemist chronology
You Disgust Me (2015)	The Carrollton Heist (2016)	Rap & Glorie (2016)

The Carrollton Heist is the second mixtape by American duo Currensy & the Alchemist. The album is a follow-up to their 2011 effort Covert Coup, and like this mixtape, features ten tracks with guest appearances from Styles P, Action Bronson and Lil Wayne.

== Reception ==
Professional ratings
Review scores
Source	Rating
HipHopDX	4/5
Spin	7/10
Sputnikmusic	3.4/5

== Track listing ==
- All songs produced by the Alchemist
1. "Cartridge"
2. "Black Rally Stripes"
3. "Vibrations"
4. "Disappearing Ink" (featuring Styles P)
5. "Inspiration" (featuring Action Bronson)
6. "500 Pounds of Gas"
7. "The Mack Book"
8. "93 AMG"
9. "Fat Albert" (featuring Lil Wayne)
10. "Smoking in the Rain"
