= Soul Sold Separately =

2022 studio album by Freddie Gibbs

Studio album by Freddie Gibbs
- Released: September 30, 2022
- Genre: Hip-hop
- Length: 46:05
- Label: ESGN; Warner
- Producer: The Alchemist; Anderson .Paak; Arianna Reid; Bizness Boi; Boi-1da; DJ Dahi; DJ Paul; Edgar JV Etienne; FaxxOnly; Fortune; Fraka; Hit-Boy; IV Beats; Jahaan Sweet; Jake One; James Blake; Jordan Houston; J.LBS; J.U.S.T.I.C.E. League; Kaytranada; Kenny Beats; Kingpin Skinny Pimp; Madlib; Neenyo; Pilgrim; Rogét Chahayed; Sean Momberger; Sevn Thomas; Super Miles; Swaggyono; Swoope; Tommy Brenneck

Freddie Gibbs chronology
Singles EP (2022)	Soul Sold Separately (2022)	You Only Die 1nce (2024)

Singles from Soul Sold Separately
- 1. "Too Much" Released: September 2, 2022; 2. "Dark Hearted" Released: September 23, 2022

Soul Sold Separately (stylized as $oul $old $eparately) is the fourth studio album by rapper Freddie Gibbs. It was released through ESGN and Warner Records on September 30, 2022, making it his first to be released on a major label.

== Background and concept ==
Soul Sold Separately is a concept album themed around the $$$ ("Triple-S") Resort and Casino, a fictional Las Vegas hotel where, according to the album's narrative, Gibbs is working in seclusion to complete the record. Gibbs has stated that the "gambling theme" of the album was chosen as a reference to the risks he needed to take to pursue his music career.

The album's title originates from "Education", a track from the 2019 project Bandana. Gibbs describes the title's meaning as follows:

In the last line of the rap, I said: 'Drugs for the free, soul sold separately.' What I meant by that line – 'Drugs for the free' – was that, yeah, I was selling drugs and making money, but what was I really making in the process? Like, in exchange for my soul?

== Critical reception ==
Professional ratings
Aggregate scores
Source	Rating
Metacritic	78/100
Review scores
Source	Rating
AllMusic	3.5/5 stars
HipHopDX	4.1/5
Pitchfork	7.7/10
Rolling Stone	7.0/10
Slant	3/5 stars
The Telegraph	4/5 stars

At Metacritic, which assigns a weighted average score out of 100 to reviews from mainstream critics, Soul Sold Separately received an average score of 78 based on 8 reviews, indicating "generally favorable reviews".

Critics generally described the album's prevailing moods as a juxtaposition of lavish aesthetics and dark, vulnerable lyrical content. Thomas Hobbs of Telegraph.co.uk characterizes the album's moods as a balance "between feeling like you're king of the world, unwinding in a presidential suites, and being ... paranoid of jealous enemies". Paul Simpson of AllMusic notes that, despite "tales of luxurious excess", the album's lyrics predominantly "focus on the bleakest aspects of the struggle". The introspective aspects of the album have been generally praised, with Gibbs described as displaying "unflinching honesty" and "sincerity [that] can be bracing". Matthew Ritchie of Pitchfork observes that "when [Gibbs] homes in on his own words and self-critiques, he's razor sharp", although in a more critical review, Paul Attard of Slant comments that Gibbs mostly discusses his controversies "in ways that allow him to avoid explaining himself fully". Gibbs' technical skill on the album received widespread critical praise: in various reviews, he has been characterized as a "technically ... flawless emcee", as utilizing "incredible rap pyrotechnics", and as "the eternal technician" with a "craftsman-like approach".

The production on Soul Sold Separately has been noted for its variety, featuring a diverse lineup of producers who bring sounds inspired by various East Coast, Midwestern, and Southern regional scenes. Within this diversity, however, several commonalities were noted. Dash Lewis of HipHopDX describes a "pretty cohesive" usage of features like "spacey synths and lush soul samples that snake around tightly coiled drums", and Paul Attard of Slant characterizes the production as "uniformly lavish". This luxurious feel has received mixed reviews; the HipHopDX review states that "at times ... the glossiness makes the album buckle under its own pressure", while Matthew Ramirez of NPR states that the project "sometimes labors under the weight of a forced progression". The Slant review was particularly critical of the opulence, describing the album as having "a decidedly perfunctory whiff of excessive grandeur". A more positive appraisal of the production came from Paul Simpson of AllMusic, who described the album as "grander in scope than Gibbs' rightly praised single-producer efforts" while still being "nearly as consistent".

The skits which take place between some songs were less positively reviewed. HipHopDX described the skits as the "most jarring" part of the album, and Pitchfork characterized them as "nonsense" that the listener must "make an effort to sort through".

== Track listing ==
No.	Title	Writer(s)	Producer(s)	Length
1.	"Couldn't Be Done" (featuring Kelly Price)	Freddie Gibbs; Ben "Lambo" Lambert; Norma "Va" Denton; Kelly Price; Norman Soloman	Swoope; Super Miles; Edgar JV Etienne^{[c]}; Harmony Samuels^{[a]}	2:31
2.	"Blackest in the Room"	Gibbs; Lambert; Denton; Daniel Maman; Michel Ripoche; Phillip Briche	The Alchemist; Etienne^{[c]}; Samuels^{[a]}	2:47
3.	"Pain & Strife" (featuring Offset)	Gibbs; Lambert; Denton; Kiari Cephus; Anthony Henderson; Antoine Carraby; Bryon McCane; Charles Scruggs; Eric Wright; Mark Green; Stanley Howse; Steven Howse; Yomo Smith	Sevn Thomas; Fraka; Etienne^{[c]}; Samuels^{[a]}	1:57
4.	"Zipper Bagz"	Gibbs; Lambert; Denton; Hareton Salvanini	Kaytranada; Etienne^{[c]}; Samuels^{[a]}	2:54
5.	"Too Much" (featuring Moneybagg Yo)	Gibbs; Lambert; Denton; DeMario White Jr.; Eldra DeBarge	IV Beats; Denton; Etienne^{[c]}; Samuels^{[a]}	3:08
6.	"Lobster Omelette" (featuring Rick Ross)	Gibbs; Lambert; Denton; William Roberts; Bobby Goldboro	Jake One; Etienne^{[c]}; Samuels^{[a]}	3:04
7.	"Space Rabbit"	Gibbs; Lambert; Denton	Boi-1da; Jahaan Sweet; Rogét Chahayed; Etienne^{[c]}; Samuels^{[a]}	2:58
8.	"Feel No Pain" (featuring Anderson .Paak and Raekwon)	Gibbs; Lambert; Denton; Brandon Paak Anderson; Corey Woods	J.LBS; Anderson .Paak; Tommy Brenneck; Etienne^{[c]}; Samuels^{[a]}	3:17
9.	"Rabbit Vision"	Gibbs; Lambert; Denton	J.U.S.T.I.C.E. League; Etienne^{[c]}; Samuels^{[a]}	3:13
10.	"PYS" (featuring DJ Paul)	Gibbs; Lambert; Denton; Paul Beauregard; Jordan Houston	DJ Paul; Etienne^{[c]}; Houston^{[c]}; Kingpin Skinny Pimp^{[c]}; Samuels^{[a]}	2:48
11.	"Dark Hearted"	Gibbs; Lambert; Denton; James Blake	Blake; Etienne^{[c]}; Samuels^{[a]}; Kyle Evans^{[a]}	3:25
12.	"Gold Rings" (featuring Pusha T)	Gibbs; Lambert; Denton; Terrence Thornton	Thomas; Sean Momberger; Sweet; Etienne^{[c]}; Samuels^{[a]}	3:42
13.	"Grandma's Stove" (featuring Musiq Soulchild)	Gibbs; Lambert; Denton; Taalib Johnson	Neenyo; Thomas; Etienne^{[c]}; Samuels^{[a]}	4:11
14.	"CIA"	Gibbs; Lambert; Denton	Madlib; Etienne^{[c]}; Samuels^{[a]}	2:56
15.	"Decoded" (featuring Scarface)	Gibbs; Lambert; Denton; Bradley Jordan	DJ Dahi; Etienne^{[c]}; Samuels^{[a]}	3:14
Total length:				46:05

Bonus Edition
No.	Title	Writer(s)	Producer(s)	Length
16.	"Big Boss Rabbit"	Gibbs; Nasir Jones; Sixto Rodriguez; William Mitchell	Swaggyono	2:58
17.	"4 Thangs" (featuring Big Sean and Hit-Boy)	Gibbs; Big Sean	Hit-Boy	1:44
18.	"Gang Signs" (featuring ScHoolboy Q)	Gibbs; Quincy Hanley	Pilgrim; FaxxOnly; Kevin "No Credit" Spencer^{[a]}	2:46
19.	"Ice Cream" (featuring Rick Ross)	Gibbs; Roberts; Woods; Robert Diggs	Kenny Beats; G Koop^{[a]}	2:03
20.	"Black Illuminati" (featuring Jadakiss)	Gibbs; Jason Phillips; Andre Robinson; Arianna Reid; Rodney Montreal	Fortune; Reid; Bizness Boi	3:49
Total length:				59:36

Notes

- ^{^[c]} signifies a co-producer
- ^{^[a]} signifies an additional producer

== Personnel ==
Musicians

- Freddie Gibbs – vocals
- Harmony Samuels – instruments
- Edgar JV Etienne – instruments
- Rania Nasreen White – additional vocals (tracks 2, 7, 9, 12, 13, 15)
- Swaggyono – programming (16)
- Hit-Boy – programming (17)
- Andre Robinson – programming (20)
- Arianna Reid – programming (20)
- Rodney Montreal – programming (20)

Technical

- Kevin "No Credit" Spencer – mastering (1–16, 18–20), mixing (1–7, 9–16, 18–20)
- Mike Bozzi – mastering (17)
- Ari Morris – mixing (5)
- Jhair "JHA" Lazo – mixing, engineering (8)
- David Kim – mixing (17)
- Thurston "Thurst McGurst" McCrea – mixing (20), engineering (1–15, 18, 20)
- Matthew Herring – engineering (1–15)
- Daniel Escobar – engineering (3)
- Lauren D'Elia – engineering (4)
- Bobby Mota – engineering (11)
- Freddie Gibbs – executive production
- Ben "Lambo" Lambert – executive production
- Norva Denton – executive production

Visuals

- Matthew Draeger – art direction
- Ben "Lambo" Lambert – creative direction
- Nick Walker – photography

== Charts ==
Chart performance for Soul Sold Separately
Chart (2022)	Peak position
Australian Albums (ARIA)	91
Belgian Albums (Ultratop Flanders)	182
Canadian Albums (Billboard)	60
US Billboard 200	11
US Top R&B/Hip-Hop Albums (Billboard)	5
