= You Only Live 2wice =

Studio album by Freddie Gibbs
- Released: March 31, 2017
- Recorded: 2016–17
- Genre: Hip hop
- Length: 31:49
- Labels: ESGN; Empire
- Producers: Freddie Gibbs (exec.); Lambo (exec.); Speakerbomb (exec.); Aaron Bow; BADBADNOTGOOD; Blair Norf; Crooklin; Dupri; DNYC3; ESVYBE; Jay Nari; Kaytranada; SLWJMZ; Teddy Walton; Pops

Freddie Gibbs chronology
Shadow of a Doubt (2015)	You Only Live 2wice (2017)	Freddie (2018)

Singles from You Only Live 2wice
- 1. "Crushed Glass" Released: March 8, 2017

You Only Live 2wice is the third studio album by American rapper Freddie Gibbs. It was released on March 31, 2017, by ESGN and Empire Distribution. The album includes eight tracks with no guest appearances.

== Background ==
In June 2016, Freddie Gibbs was arrested in France as a suspect in a rape that took place in Austria. In August, he was formally charged with sexual assault after being accused of drugging a woman and sexually abusing her while she was defenseless. On September 30, 2016, Gibbs was acquitted of all charges related to the sexual abuse allegations.

On March 8, 2017, Gibbs returned by announcing his third solo album, You Only Live 2wice, along with its pre-order link, cover art and release date via Twitter. The cover art shows Gibbs floating above a crowd, reminiscent of Renaissance art depicting the resurrection of Jesus.

== Promotion ==
The first single, "Crushed Glass", was released on the day of the album's announcement, March 8, 2017, for digital download. It was accompanied by its music video, directed by Eric Nelson. On March 15, 2017, Gibbs released a freestyle of "PRBLMS" by 6LACK titled "NO PRBLMS".

== Critical reception ==
Professional ratings
Aggregate scores
Source	Rating
Metacritic	76/100
Review scores
Source	Rating
The A.V. Club	B+
The 405	7.5/10
Hip Hop N More	8.0/10
Paste Magazine	7.0/10
Pitchfork	7.5/10
HotNewHipHop	8.5/10

You Only Live 2wice was received positively by critics. At Metacritic, which assigns a normalized rating out of 100 to reviews from mainstream publications, the album received an average score of 76, based on 9 reviews. Nate Patrin of Pitchfork complimented the album's theme of resurrection and Gibbs' delivery, writing that "His vocal command is still stunning, that rough-hewn flexibility in his voice putting across intensity and vulnerability at the same time. And when the beat goes melodramatic (or dramatically mellow)—the aching violin-laced Speakerbomb-produced flip of Sade's "Fear" on "Crushed Glass", molasses-creeping to billowy new age keyboards on "Homesick", satiny vocal-harmony R&B on "Andrea"—each syllable feels like a knuckle busting your eyebrow open. You could look at You Only Live 2wice as a transitional record—and many could see it that way dismissively, given its brief borderline-EP runtime—but whatever turning point this might be in Gibbs' career, it stands to reason that he'll still be making diamonds out of pressure." Clayton Purdom of The A.V. Club said that You Only Live 2wice "functions as an absolute firehose of dazzlingly dense verses—it's hard to imagine him going for much longer than its 30 minutes, though you know he could—as well as a showcase for some of the strange new ground he's charting", also adding that "much of the rest of this operates in the same mold as his last record, 2015's solid Shadow of a Doubt. It's tempting to want some sort of grand, dark reinvention here", and "It sounds instead much more like an artist stepping back into his old pocket with great relief and delivering the verses he feared he'd never be allowed to. He's packing even more words in and rapping harder than ever, like his life depended on it."

Samantha O'Connor of The 405 commented on the emotive nature of the album, stating "You Only Live 2wice is a reflection of past mistakes, a declaration of dreams for his family’s future and a time stamp for the strenuous reality of an artist who nearly lost it all on his way to gaining it all. Despite adamantly denying the claims against him, his self-aware bars admit guilt in allowing the game to get the best of him as he details the price he's paid for rash decisions over personally cinematic beats from the likes of Kaytranada, BADBADNOTGOOD and League of Starz. And in true lyrical Gibbs fashion, his pen paints a peephole into his time behind bars - from his inability to read the jail's German library books to Erica's decision to fly overseas to comfort him leading up to trial." Stephen Kearse of Paste Magazine highlighted Gibbs' lyrical content: "Gibbs' greatest celebration of freedom is his rapping. He's always had a bit of a power-tool approach to rapping, zeroing in on counter-rhythms and replicating them with mechanic precision. But here he alters his flows almost subconsciously, his words tumbling out at different speeds just for the sheer thrill. "Andrea" and "20 Karat Jesus" have sequences where the words just cannot fit within the note, but Gibbs remains completely at ease, determined to keep the stream flowing, obstacles be damned."

== Track listing ==
Album credits adapted from official liner notes.

No.	Title	Writer(s)	Producer(s)	Length
1.	"20 Karat Jesus"	Fredrick Tipton; Blair Lowery; Shaqueal Wilson; Sidney Miller; Andrew Papaleo	Blair Norf; ESVYBE; Speakerbomb; Pops	5:21
2.	"Alexys"	Tipton; Louis Celestin; Matthew Tavares; Chester Hansen; Alexander Sowinski; Leland Whitty	Kaytranada; BADBADNOTGOOD	2:59
3.	"Crushed Glass"	Tipton; Miller; Travis Walton; Aaron Booe	Teddy Walton; Aaron Bow; Speakerbomb^{[a]}	4:35
4.	"Dear Maria"	Tipton; Lowery; Miller	Blair Norf; Speakerbomb	3:55
5.	"Amnesia"	Tipton; Miller; Regis Bell; Jason Wilkinson; Donte Blacksher	Dupri; Jay Nari; DNYC3; Speakerbomb^{[a]}	3:18
6.	"Andrea"	Tipton; Papaleo; Miller; Adrian Hogan; R. Scott-Wood	Pops; SLWJMZ; Crooklin; Speakerbomb^{[a]}	3:12
7.	"Phone Lit"	Tipton; Miller; Ben Lambert	Superville; Lambo^{[a]}; Speakerbomb^{[a]}	4:00
8.	"Homesick"	Tipton; Papaleo; Miller; Hogan	Pops; Speakerbomb; SLWJMZ	4:29
Total length:				31:49

Notes

- ^{^{^[a]}} signifies a co-producer
- "20 Karat Jesus" features additional vocals by Slink Johnson
- "Alexys" features additional vocals by Chester Hansen
- "Crushed Glass" features additional vocals by Brittany B
- "Dear Maria" features additional vocals by Lil Sodi
- "Amensia" features additional vocals by Dupri
- "Andrea" features additional vocals by Paxton "Paxman" Miller, Gregory "Big Time" Watts and Leon Thomas
- "Homesick" features additional vocals by Gregory "Big Time" Watts and Leon Thomas
- "Phone Lit" features additional vocals by Leon Thomas

Sample credits

- "Crushed Glass" contains a sample of "Fear" by Sade, written by Sade Adu and Stuart Matthewman.

== Charts ==
Chart (2017)	Peak position
New Zealand Heatseekers Albums (RMNZ)	5
US Billboard 200	124

Chart (2024)	Peak position
UK R&B Albums (OCC)	7
Scottish Albums (OCC)	84
