= Freddie Gibbs =

American rapper (born 1982)

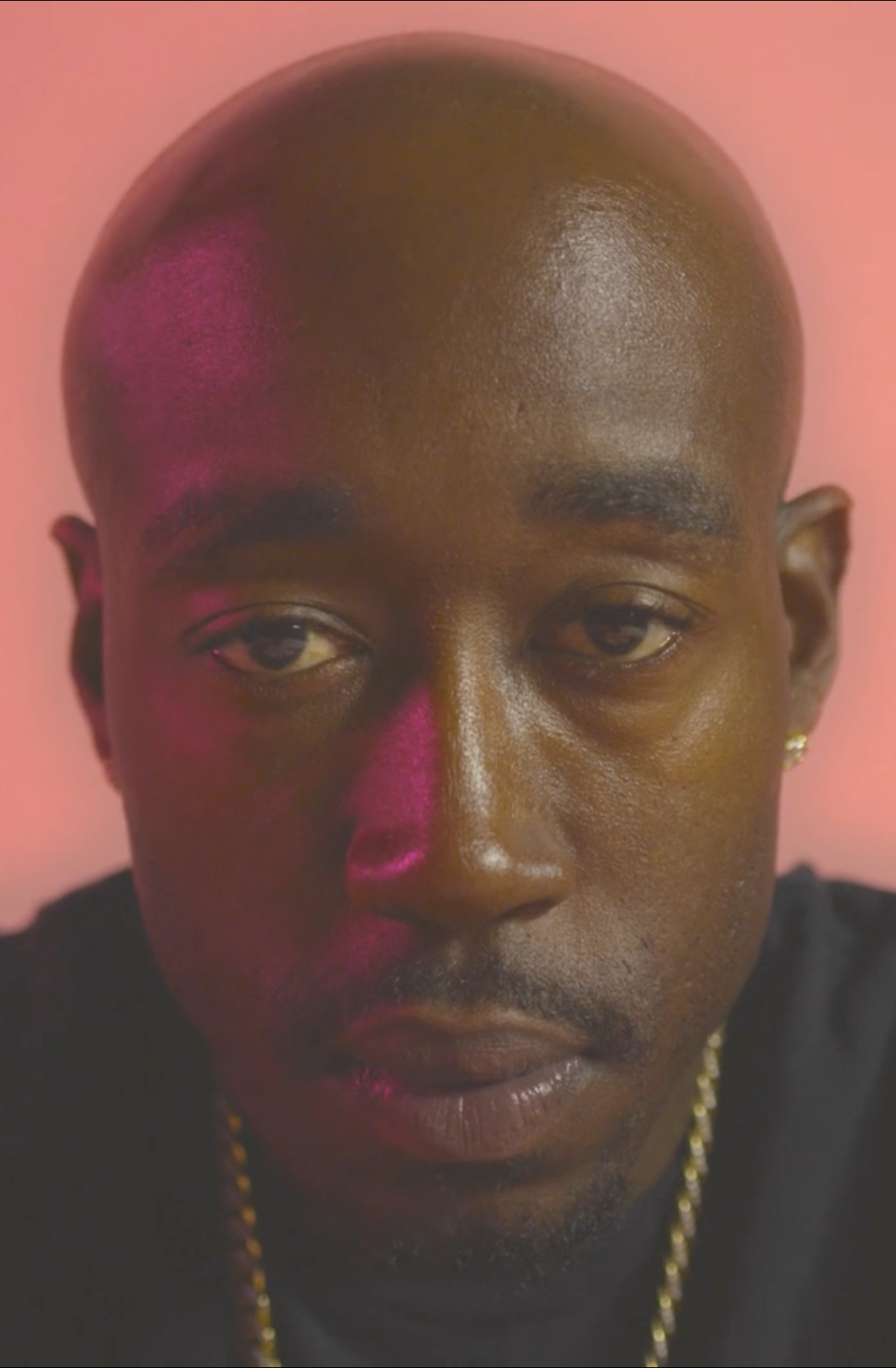
- Gibbs in 2018

Background information
- Also known as: Gangsta Gibbs; Freddie Kane; Kane; Freddie Forgiato; Big Boss Rabbit; Steel City Stick-Up Kid
- Born: Fredrick Jamel Tipton; June 14, 1982 (age 44); Gary, Indiana, U.S.
- Genres: Midwestern hip-hop; gangsta rap; alternative hip-hop
- Occupations: Rapper; songwriter
- Works: Freddie Gibbs discography
- Years active: 2004–present
- Labels: Warner; ESGN; Str8 Slammin'; CTE World; Decon; Interscope; No Tamin
- Member of: MadGibbs; P.O.C.
- Children: 2

Fredrick Jamel Tipton (born June 14, 1982), known professionally as Freddie Gibbs, is an American rapper. He signed with Interscope Records in 2006 and recorded his debut album for the label; however, its release was cancelled and he was dropped from the label due to executive shakeups. Gibbs later signed with Young Jeezy's CTE World in 2011 and released a number of mixtapes through the label, including the acclaimed Baby Face Killa (2012).

After leaving CTE in early 2013, Gibbs formed the record label ESGN to release his debut studio album of the same name in June of that year. His second and third albums, Shadow of a Doubt (2015) and You Only Live 2wice (2017), were both met with positive critical and lukewarm commercial reception—the latter contained no guest appearances. His commercial mixtape, Freddie (2018), was met with critical acclaim and led him to sign with Warner Records in 2020; his fourth album and major label debut, Soul Sold Separately (2022) peaked at number 11 on the Billboard 200. His fifth studio album, You Only Die 1nce (2024), narrowly entered the chart. In addition, he has released five collaborative albums; two with Madlib: Piñata (2014) and Bandana (2019), and three with the Alchemist: Fetti (2018, also with Currensy), Alfredo (2020), and Alfredo 2 (2025). Alfredo was nominated for Best Rap Album at the 63rd Annual Grammy Awards.

His guest appearance on ¥$ (Kanye West and Ty Dolla Sign)'s 2024 song, "Back to Me", peaked at number 26 on the Billboard Hot 100 and became his first entry on the chart, though he remains uncredited on the official version.

== Early life ==
Fredrick Jamal Tipton was born June 14, 1982, in Gary, Indiana, and grew up at 17th and Virginia St. on the city's east side. His father, Warren Tipton, was a R&B and soul singer and a member of the The Chi-Lites Tipton played football at Ball State University on an athletic scholarship but was eventually expelled from college. At the age of 19, he was enlisted into the U.S. Army as part of a pre-trial diversion program when he was on trial for theft and gun charges, but was dishonorably discharged only eight months later after being caught smoking marijuana.

Tipton then began working at a Gary mall, where he met local hip-hop producer Finger Roll, who, according to Gibbs, was "the only guy [in Gary] that had a studio." Gibbs then joined Finger Roll's No Tamin Entertainment crew and began pursuing a rap career.

== Career ==
=== 2004–2011: Career beginnings and CTE World ===
Gibbs's rap career began in 2004, self-releasing his first full-length project, a mixtape titled Full Metal Jackit, which he followed up with a sequel that same year. Around that time, he was signed to Interscope Records and began working on his debut album, but was dropped from the label in late 2006, when the man that signed him, Joe Weinberger, left the label. In 2009, Gibbs released the mixtapes The Miseducation of Freddie Gibbs and Midwestgangstaboxframecadillacmuzik, followed by his first extended play Str8 Killa in August 2010.

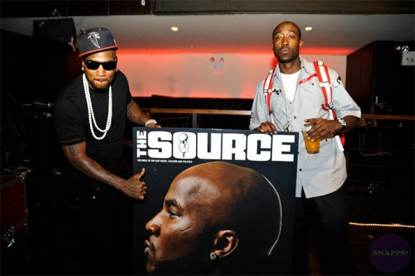
Gibbs (right) with Young Jeezy in August 2011

P.O.C.
- Also known as: Pulled Over by the Cops
- Genre: Alternative hip-hop
- Years active: 2011–present
- Past members: Freddie Gibbs; Chip tha Ripper; The Cool Kids

He would continue self-releasing mixtapes until 2011, when he signed to Young Jeezy's record label CTE World. In February that year, Gibbs announced on his website that he had joined up with fellow rappers King Chip and The Cool Kids to form the supergroup Pulled Over by the Cops (P.O.C.). In October, he released the mixtape Cold Day in Hell, which featured guest appearances from Young Jeezy, Juicy J, and 2 Chainz, among others. The mixtape received significant coverage from publications such as Pitchfork and XXL, appearing on the latter's Freshman List Class of 2010. Gibbs and hip-hop producer Madlib released their first and second extended plays, titled Thuggin' and Shame, in September 2011 and June 2012, respectively. The EPs served as previews for their upcoming collaborative album, which was originally titled Cocaine Piñata, and later renamed to simply Piñata.

Shortly after the release of Cold Day in Hell, Gibbs announced that his next mixtape would be a Gangsta Grillz mixtape titled Baby Face Killa. It was released on September 25, 2012, and featured guest appearances from Pharrell Williams, Jadakiss, Jay Rock, Currensy, YG, and others. The second track from the album, "Still Livin'" was featured on the 2013 video game Grand Theft Auto V's virtual in-game radio station Radio Los Santos.

=== 2012–2018: Solo albums and Piñata ===
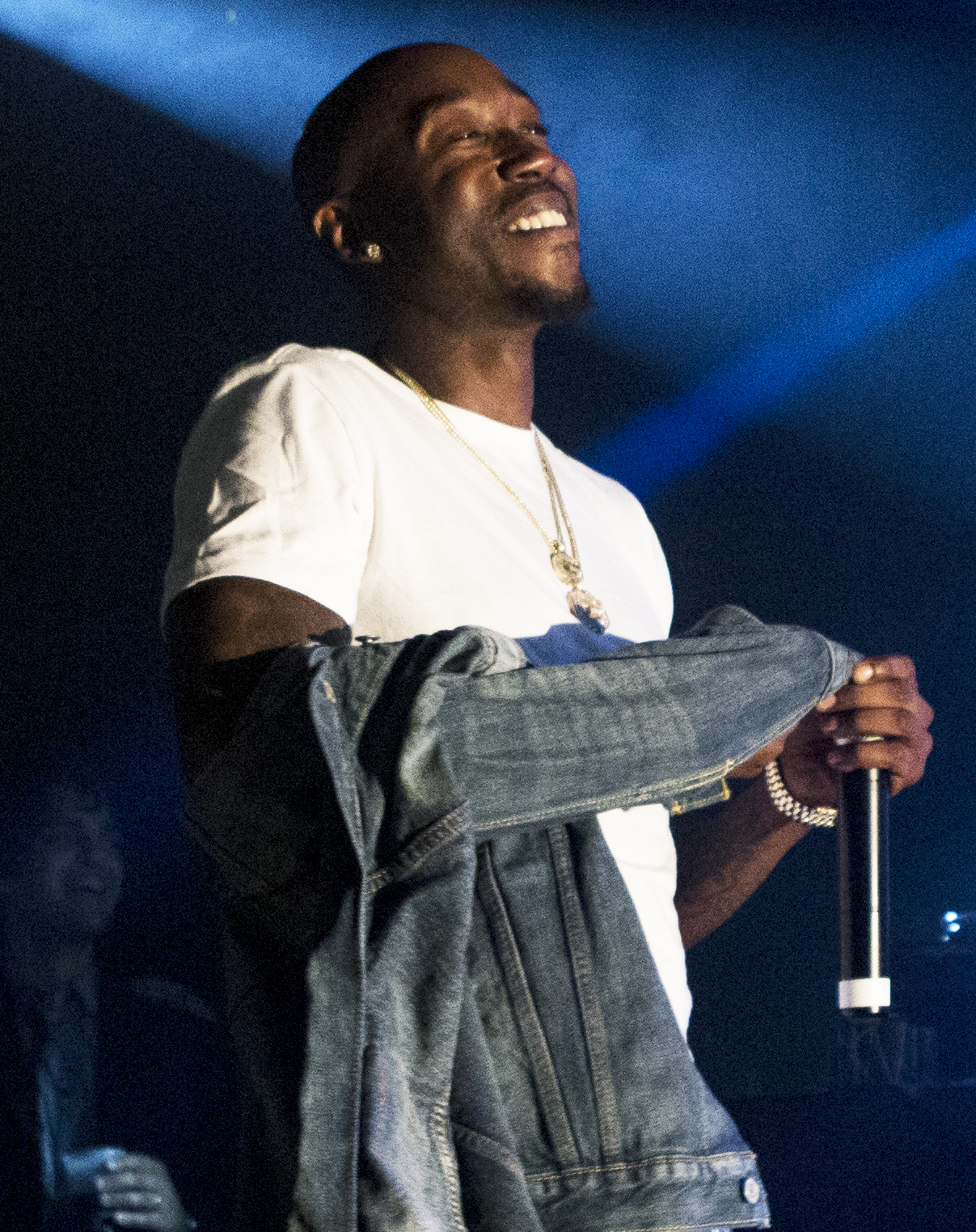
Gibbs performing with Madlib in 2014

On December 11, 2012, Gibbs announced that he was no longer a member of Young Jeezy's CTE label. He elaborated saying that there is no beef between the two rappers. On May 27, 2013, Freddie Gibbs announced he would be releasing his debut album ESGN (Evil Seeds Grow Naturally) on July 9, 2013, through his own record label of the same name. The album ended up being released on June 20, three weeks before the planned release date, due to a leak.

In September 2013, Freddie Gibbs and Madlib released Deeper, the final EP from the Piñata previews trilogy. Piñata itself was subsequently released on March 18, 2014. The album received universal acclaim from music critics with a score of 82 on the review site Metacritic. It peaked at number 39 on the US Billboard 200 and number seven on the US Top Rap Albums charts. On July 1, 2014, Gibbs, Young Thug, and ASAP Ferg released a single titled "Old English". It was produced by Salva and Nick Hook and was certified Gold by the Recording Industry Association of America (RIAA) on July 23, 2020, for selling over 500,000 certified units. In October 2014, Gibbs and Madlib released their fourth EP, titled Knicks (Remix).

In March 2015, Gibbs released a three-track EP titled Pronto, which was followed up by his second solo studio album, Shadow of a Doubt, released on November 20, 2015. Gibbs's third solo studio album, You Only Live 2wice, was released in March 2017. The only single, "Crushed Glass", was released simultaneously alongside a music video directed by Eric Nelson. In June 2018, he released his first commercial mixtape, Freddie without any prior announcements.

=== 2018–present: Further collaborations and increasing success ===
After the success of Piñata, Gibbs and Madlib announced in May 2016 that they were developing a second collaborative album. The resulting project was the album Bandana, which was released in June 2019. Bandana was preceded by two singles: "Flat Tummy Tea" and "Bandana", the latter featuring the dancehall artist Assassin. The singles were released in February and March 2019 respectively. Bandana was released by Keep Cool Records, RCA Records, Madlib Invazion, and ESGN, and received critical acclaim.

Gibbs also released multiple collaborations with producer the Alchemist. Their first project together was Fetti, a collaborative album between Gibbs, the Alchemist, and rapper Currensy. Fetti was released in October 2018. Gibbs and the Alchemist then reunited to release a second collaborative album, titled Alfredo, in May 2020. Alfredo was preceded a day earlier by its lead single, "1985", as well as an accompanying music video directed by Nick Walker. The album debuted at number 15 on the Billboard 200, making it both Gibbs's and the Alchemist's highest-charting album to date. It was critically praised, and was nominated for a Grammy Award for Best Rap Album at the 63rd Annual Grammy Awards.

In June 2020, Gibbs signed to Warner Records. Throughout late 2020 and early 2021, Gibbs released three singles through the label: "4 Thangs", which features guest appearances from fellow rapper Big Sean and hip-hop producer Hit-Boy; "Gang Signs", featuring fellow rapper Schoolboy Q; and "Big Boss Rabbit". Gibbs then released his first album on Warner and fifth overall solo album, Soul Sold Separately, in September 2022.

In addition to his musical ventures, Gibbs had a cameo role in the first season of the Starz drama series Power Book IV: Force in March 2022. He portrayed the role of Cousin Buddy, a cross-eyed drug dealer.

On October 30, 2024, Gibbs announced the release of his sixth studio album, You Only Die 1nce. The album dropped on November 1. Gibbs reunited with former collaborater the Alchemist in 2025 and released Alfredo 2 on July 25 to positive reviews.

== Artistry ==
Critics have recognized Gibbs's technically proficient and stylistically diverse rapping ability. Matthew Ramirez of NPR has described him as "the eternal technician"; Tshepo Mokoena of The Guardian characterized him as "a classic rapper's rapper" and stated that "when it comes to technique and versatility, he can take your breath away". He was featured on the soundtracks for Max Payne 3, NBA 2K12, Sleeping Dogs, and Grand Theft Auto V.

Gibbs has listed Scarface, DMX, Tupac, Jay-Z, Nas, Bone Thugs-N-Harmony, Geto Boys, UGK, Three 6 Mafia, Outkast, Raekwon, Eminem, Twista, Ice Cube, Noreaga, Juvenile, Spice 1, De La Soul, Kool G Rap, Black Thought, Mos Def, Jeezy, and Ol' Dirty Bastard as some of his influences.

== Personal life ==
Gibbs has said that while he is not a fan of organized religion, he most closely identifies as a Muslim, calling it "a personal relationship between myself and God." Gibbs is the father of three children: a daughter (born 2015) with his ex-fiancée Erica Dickerson, daughter of Hall Of Fame NFL running back Eric Dickerson, and a son from a previous relationship.

On November 4, 2014, a gunman opened fire on Gibbs, who was sitting in a car after he had finished performing at a record store in Williamsburg, Brooklyn, New York. Gibbs escaped unharmed and two members of his entourage received non-life-threatening gunshot wounds.

In May 2015, Gibbs launched a GoFundMe to help School Supply Giveaway of Gary purchase school supplies for children in Gary, Indiana. On the site page, Gibbs explained, "Growing up in Gary there was little opportunity for a kid like me to make something of myself. Not having the basic supplies ... left a lot of us with little motivation to do well in school and turned a lot of us to darker paths. By helping these students acquire the basic supplies every student needs and deserves you will be maximizing their chances at a brighter future."

== Legal issues ==
Before performing a concert at Le Rex in Toulouse, France, in June 2016, Gibbs was arrested on a European Arrest Warrant by French authorities issued for a rape alleged to have taken place in Austria in 2015, and extradited to Vienna on sexual assault charges, Gibbs said he "has no intention of escaping justice, whether French or Austrian" and was charged the following month with sexual abuse charges on two women. After being held in jail for a number of weeks he was released on bail of €50,000, and acquitted on all charges in September 2016.

== Feuds ==
Gibbs has been involved in several public feuds with other rappers. In December 2021, it was reported that Gibbs was beaten up by members of Jim Jones' entourage at a restaurant in Miami. His most notable feud has been with Benny the Butcher. In August 2022, after trading insults with Benny the Butcher over social media for several months, Freddie Gibbs was physically assaulted by a large mob of people while on a date at a Dinosaur Bar-B-Que location in Buffalo, New York. TMZ acquired footage of the brawl, leading the video to go viral. Benny the Butcher seemed to confirm his involvement in the incident, posting images on social media of a chain allegedly taken from Gibbs during the fight. In a January 2024 interview with The Breakfast Club, Benny stated that the beef between the two rappers was over, but that he was not interested in making amends with Gibbs.

== Discography ==
Studio albums

- ESGN (2013)
- Shadow of a Doubt (2015)
- You Only Live 2wice (2017)
- $oul $old $eparately (2022)
- You Only Die 1nce (2024)

Collaboration albums

- Piñata (with Madlib) (2014)
- Fetti (with Curren$y and the Alchemist) (2018)
- Bandana (with Madlib) (2019)
- Alfredo (with The Alchemist) (2020)
- Alfredo 2 (with the Alchemist) (2025)

== Concert tours ==
Headlining

- Shadow of a Doubt Tour (2016)
- You Only Live 2wice Tour (2017)
- Freddie Tour (2018)
- The Album of the Year Tour (2019)
- Space Rabbit Tour (2022)
- Alfredo 2 Tour (2025)
- The Last Rabbit Tour (2026)

Co-headlining

- Independent Grind Tour 2014 (with Tech N9ne) (2014)

Supporting

- Young Jeezy – TM103 Tour (2011)

== Filmography ==
=== Television ===
Year	Title	Role	Notes
2011	RapFix Live	Himself	Season 2, episode 23
2013	Live from the Streets	Himself	Season 2, episode 5
2013	Frames	Himself	
2014	Loiter Squad	Himself	Season 3, episode 9: "Tombstone"
2015	GGN	Himself	Season 7, episode 4
2020	The Eric Andre Show	Himself	Season 5, episode 9: "Is Your Wife Still Depressed?"
2021	Desus & Mero	Himself	
2021	The Beat with Ari Melber	Himself	
2022	Bust Down	Chauncey	Re-occurring character
2022	Power Book IV: Force	Cousin Buddy	Re-occurring character
2022	Yo! MTV Raps	Himself	Season 1, episode 1
2023	The Tonight Show Starring Jimmy Fallon	Himself	Season 8, episode 112
2023	Wu-Tang: An American Saga	Priest	Season 3, episode 8: "Liquid Swords"

=== Films ===
Year	Title	Role	Notes
2021	Down with the King	Money Merc	
2025	Night Patrol	Bornelius	

=== Video Games ===
Year	Title	Role	Notes
2026	Grand Theft Auto VI	Freddie	

== Awards and nominations ==
Award	Year	Recipient(s) and nominee(s)	Category	Result	Ref.
Grammy Awards	2021	Alfredo (with the Alchemist)	Best Rap Album	Nominated	
MTV Video Music Awards	2025	Mutt (Remix) (with Leon Thomas)	Best R&B	Nominated	
